= The Recluse (Plan B song) =

Single by Plan B

from the album The Defamation of Strickland Banks
- Released: 4 October 2010
- Recorded: 2009; The Sanctuary, London
- Genre: Soul; hip hop
- Length: 3:19
- Label: 679; Atlantic
- Songwriter: Ben Drew
- Producers: Ben Drew; Eric Appapoulay (add.)

Plan B singles chronology
"Prayin'" (2010)	"The Recluse" (2010)	"Love Goes Down" (2010)

"The Recluse" is the fourth single from Plan B's second album The Defamation of Strickland Banks. The single was released on 4 October 2010. "The Recluse" has been labeled as "one of his best singles to date" by critics, "neatly marrying poignancy and aggression into a 4-minute-long track with a surplus of scaling strings and his voice showing more desperation for release than ever before." This song was covered by George Michael during his "Symphonica" tour.

== Music video ==
The music video for "The Recluse" was directed by Daniel Wolfe and shows Strickland Banks, played by Plan B, during his time in prison, as well as flashbacks of his life before prison. It was first aired online on YouTube on September 14, 2010. Actress Vicky McClure plays Strickland Banks' girlfriend. At the start of the video a snippet of "The Ballad of Belmarsh" can be heard.

== Track listing ==
- UK CD single
1. "The Recluse" – 3:19
2. "The Recluse" (Nero Remix) – 4:36
3. "The Recluse" (Netsky Remix) – 4:56
- UK Promotional CD single
1. "The Recluse" (Nero Remix) – 4:36
2. "The Recluse" (Nero Instrumental) – 4:36
3. "The Recluse" (Netsky Remix) – 4:56
4. "The Recluse" (Netsky Edit) – 3:08
- UK 12" vinyl
1. "The Recluse" – 3:19
2. "The Recluse" (Nero Remix) – 4:36
3. "The Recluse" (Netsky Remix) – 4:56
- Digital download - Remix
1. "The Recluse" (Nero Remix) – 4:36
- Digital download - Remix
1. "The Recluse" (Netsky Remix) – 4:56

== Personnel ==
- Plan B – vocals, producer

Production

- Eric Appapoulay – additional producer
- David McEwan – engineer
- Mark "Top" Rankin – mixing

Additional musicians

- Tom Wright-Goss – guitar
- Eric Appapoulay – bass
- Richard Cassell – drums

== Chart performance ==
Chart (2010)	Peak position
UK R&B (The Official Charts Company)	10
UK Singles (Official Charts)	35
