= Lol Crawley =

British cinematographer

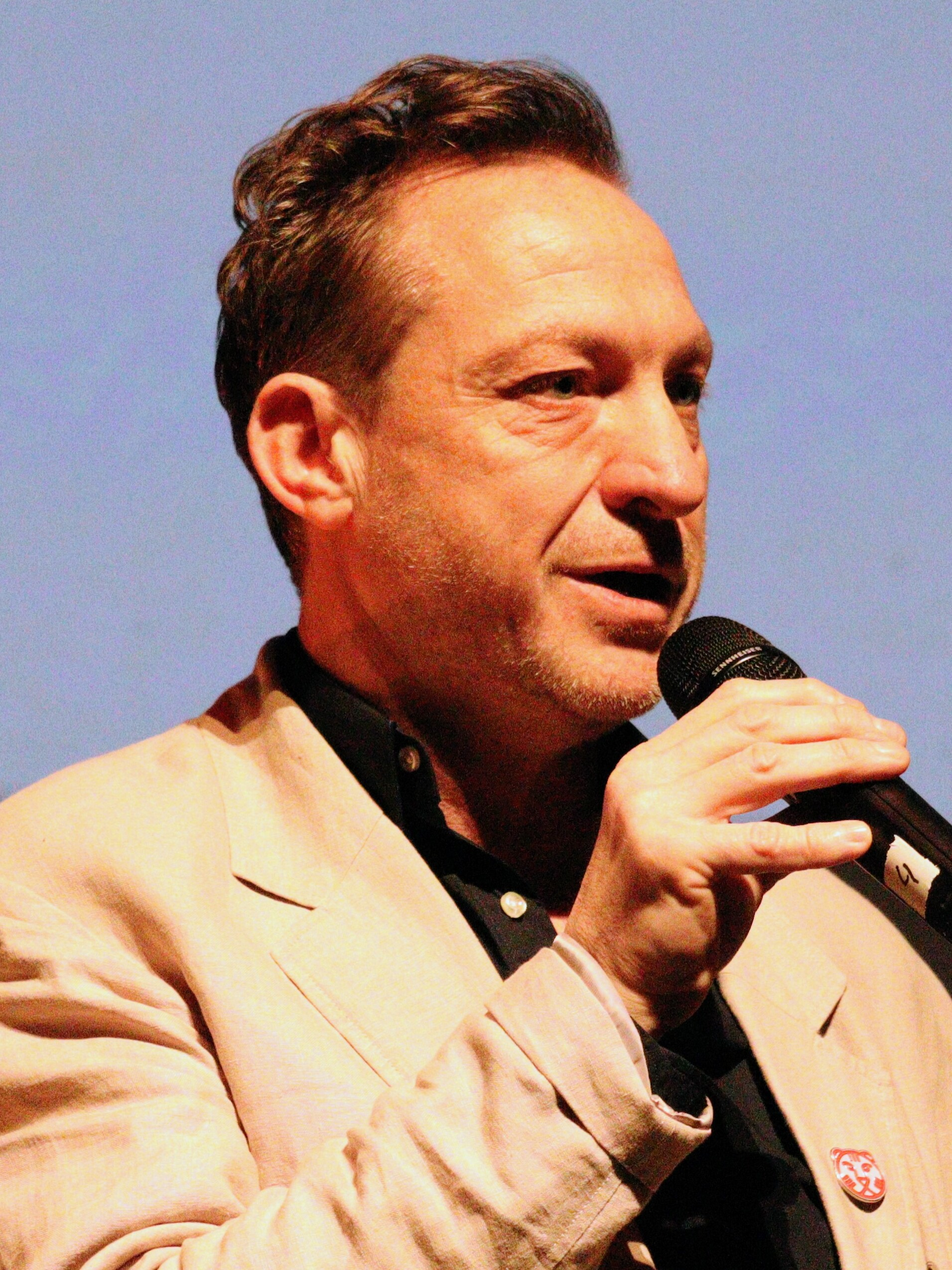
- Crawley at the IFFR 2025
- Born: 2 November 1974 (age 52); Shrewsbury, Shropshire, England
- Education: Northumbria University
- Occupation: Cinematographer
- Years active: 1998–present
- Website: lolcrawley.com

Laurie "Lol" Crawley (born 2 November 1974) is a British cinematographer, known for his Oscar-winning work on The Brutalist (2024).

His other works also include Ballast (2008), Four Lions (2010), 45 Years (2015), The Humans (2020), and White Noise (2022) as well as the BBC Two series The Crimson Petal and the White (2011) and the Netflix series The OA (2016) and Black Mirror (2017).

== Education ==
Crawley attended Ysgol Llanfyllin.

In the 1990s, he attended Northumbria University to study film and media production.

== Career ==
In 2013, he shot Mandela: Long Walk to Freedom, which was shown at the Toronto International Film Festival.

Crawley has been inducted into the British Society of Cinematographers.

He has been awarded two cinematography awards at film festivals, and also has been nominated for four Film Independent Spirit Awards.

== Reception ==
In 2016 The Playlist profiled Crawley in their filmmakers on the rise stating that, "British DP Lol Crawley isn't quite a brand new name — he's been doing some remarkably impressive work in features for nearly a decade now. But of late, he's gone from an extraordinarily impressive cinematographer to staking his claim at being one of the best in the world."

== Filmography ==
=== Film ===
Year	Title	Director	Notes
2008	Ballast	Lance Hammer	
2008	Better Things	Duane Hopkins	
2009	Wasted	Stuart Davids; Caroline Paterson	
2009	Four Lions	Chris Morris	
2010	Donkeys	Morag McKinnon	
2011	On the Ice	Andrew Okpeaha MacLean	
2011	Here	Braden King	
2012	Hyde Park on Hudson	Roger Michell	
2013	Mandela: Long Walk to Freedom	Justin Chadwick	
2015	45 Years	Andrew Haigh	
2015	The Childhood of a Leader	Brady Corbet	1st collaboration with Corbet
2018	Vox Lux	Brady Corbet	
2019	Dau	Ilya Khrzhanovsky	With Manuel Alberto Claro and Jürgen Jürges
2020	The Secret Garden	Marc Munden	
2020	The Devil All the Time	Antonio Campos	
2021	The Humans	Stephen Karam	
2022	White Noise	Noah Baumbach	
2024	The Brutalist	Brady Corbet	
2026	Wicker	Alex Huston Fischer; Eleanor Wilson	
2026	DreamQuil	Alex Prager	
2027	Untitled Damien Chazelle film †	Damien Chazelle	Post-production
TBA	The Origin of the World †	Brady Corbet	Filming

Ref.:

Documentary film

Year	Title	Director	Notes
2010	One Night in Turin	James Erskine	
2011	From the Ashes	James Erskine	With Joel Devlin and Richard Malins
2015	The Reflektor Tapes	Kahlil Joseph	With Autumn Durald Arkapaw and Malik Hassan Sayeed
2021	Shadow Kingdom: The Early Songs of Bob Dylan	Alma Har'el	Concert film

=== Television ===
Year	Title	Director	Notes
2003	Reps	Andy Ross	
2007	Where There's a Will	Daniel Elliott	Documentary series
2011	The Crimson Petal and the White	Marc Munden	Miniseries
2012	Murder	Birger Larsen	Episode "Joint Enterprise"
2014	Turn: Washington's Spies	Rupert Wyatt	Episode "Pilot"
2014	Utopia	Marc Munden; Sam Donovan	Season 2
2016	The OA	Zal Batmanglij	Season 1
2017	Black Mirror	John Hillcoat	Episode "Crocodile"

Ref.:

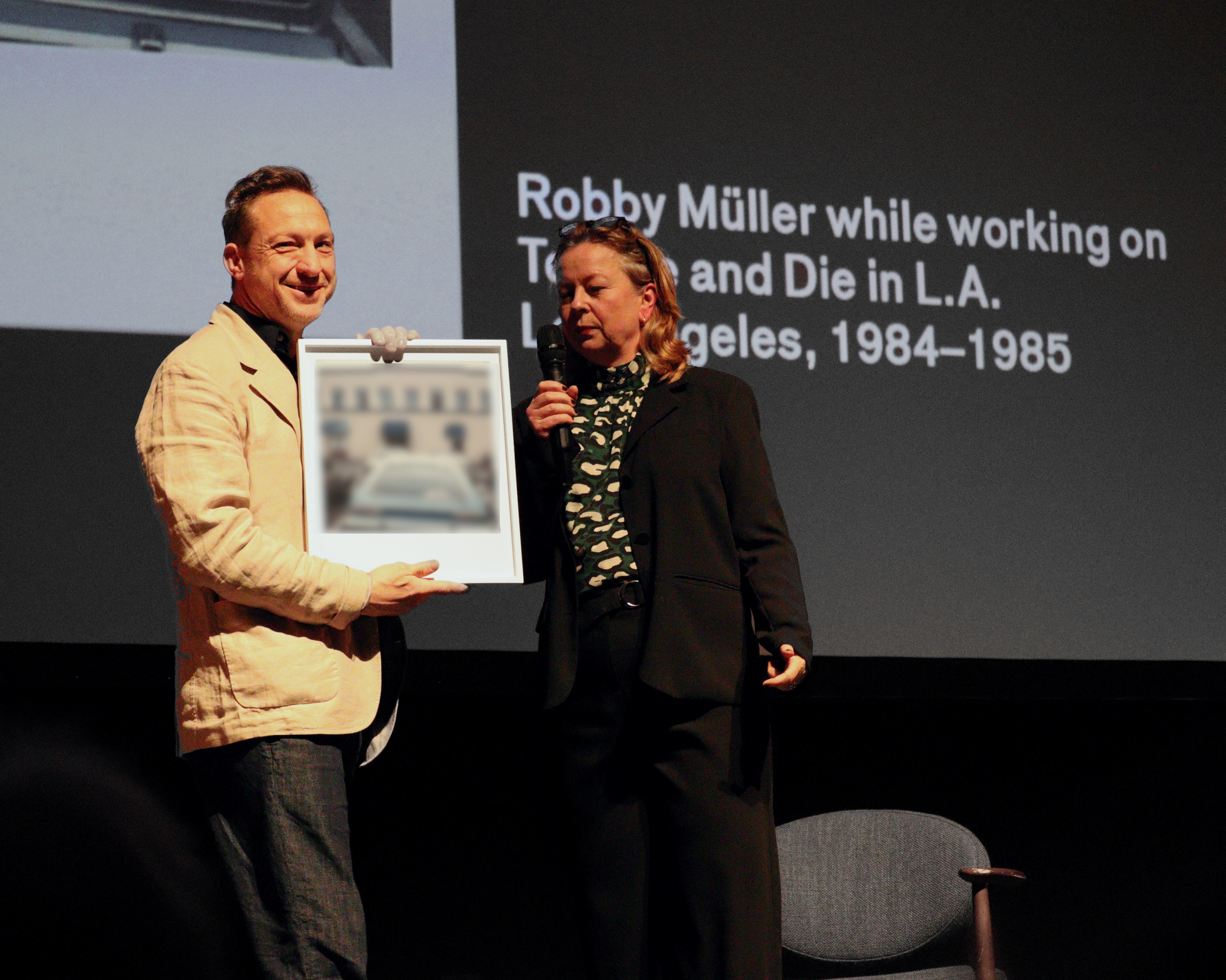
Crawley receiving the Robby Müller Award at the IFFR 2025

=== Music video ===
Year	Title	Artist	Ref.
2010	"Stay Too Long"	Plan B	
2010	"She Said"	Plan B	
2010	"Love Goes Down"	Plan B	
2010	"Hang With Me"	Robyn	
2011	"Blind Faith"	Chase and Status	
2011	"Charlie Brown"	Coldplay	
2011	"Take Another Ride"	Kassidy	

== Awards and nominations ==
Year	Association	Category	Title	Result	Ref.
2008	Sundance Film Festival	Excellence in Cinematography	Ballast	Won	
2009	Independent Spirit Awards	Best Cinematography	Ballast	Nominated	
2010	UK Music Video Awards	Best Cinematography	Plan B - "Stay Too Long"	Won	
2010	Design and Art Direction Awards	Best Cinematography	Plan B - "Stay Too Long"	Nominated	
2011	Woodstock Film Festival	Best Cinematography	On the Ice	Won	
2013	Independent Spirit Awards	Best Cinematography	Here	Nominated	
2014	Royal Television Society	Photography - Drama	Utopia	Won	
2017	Independent Spirit Awards	Best Cinematography	The Childhood of a Leader	Nominated	
2022	Independent Spirit Awards	Best Cinematography	The Humans	Nominated	
2025	International Film Festival Rotterdam	Robby Müller Award		Won	
2025	Academy Awards	Best Cinematography	The Brutalist	Won	
2025	American Society of Cinematographers	Outstanding Achievement in Cinematography	The Brutalist	Nominated	
2025	BAFTA Awards	Best Cinematography	The Brutalist	Won	
2025	British Society of Cinematographers	Best Cinematography	The Brutalist	Won	
2025	Critics' Choice Movie Awards	Best Cinematography	The Brutalist	Nominated	
