= Rough and Rowdy Ways World Wide Tour =

2021–2026 concert tour by Bob Dylan

- Tour by Bob Dylan
- Promotional poster
- Location: Asia; Europe; North America
- Associated album: Rough and Rowdy Ways; Shadow Kingdom
- Start date: November 2, 2021
- End date: May 1, 2026
- Legs: 10
- No. of shows: 303

Bob Dylan concert chronology
- Never Ending Tour 2019 (2019); Rough and Rowdy Ways World Wide Tour (2021–26); Long Hot Summer Tour '26 (2026)

The Rough and Rowdy Ways World Wide Tour was a concert tour by American singer-songwriter Bob Dylan in support of his 39th studio album Rough and Rowdy Ways (2020). The tour began in Milwaukee, Wisconsin, on November 2, 2021, and was originally billed as ending in 2024 but was extended several times and concluded in Abilene, Texas, on May 1, 2026. It is regarded by some journalists as part of the Never Ending Tour.

== Background ==
Dylan's 39th studio album was released in June 2020. The release was originally set to coincide with Dylan's 2020 Never Ending Tour with Nathaniel Rateliff & the Night Sweats and The Hot Club of Cowtown. The 'Never Ending Tour 2020' was then postponed and later cancelled entirely due to the COVID-19 pandemic.

Shadow Kingdom: The Early Songs of Bob Dylan, a live-streamed concert film, was later released in July 2021 in lieu of any live performances. Shadow Kingdom showcases Dylan in an intimate setting as he performs songs from his extensive body of work, created especially for this event. It marked his first concert performance since December 2019, and first performance since his universally acclaimed album Rough and Rowdy Ways. The earliest composition in the set list was "It's All Over Now, Baby Blue" from the 1965 album Bringing It All Back Home and the most recent composition was "What Was It You Wanted" from 1989's Oh Mercy.

The Rough and Rowdy Ways World Wide Tour (2021–2024) was announced in September 2021. The shows were announced as the first leg of a world tour in support of Dylan's album Rough And Rowdy Ways, set to run until 2024. It was the first time he had played to a live audience since December 2019, with the ongoing COVID-19 pandemic forcing Dylan to pause his decades-long 'Never Ending Tour'.

In Milwaukee, Wisconsin on November 2, 2021, the first show of the first leg of the tour, Dylan introduced two new members of his touring band: drummer Charley Drayton, replacing Matt Chamberlain, and guitarist Doug Lancio, replacing Charlie Sexton. Dylan played eight of the 10 songs from Rough and Rowdy Ways at every show on this leg of the tour, which was acclaimed by critics, some of whom noted that it was rare for a "legacy artist" to focus so extensively on recent material in live performance.

On January 24, 2022 a further twenty-seven concerts were announced taking place in the Southern United States, beginning in Phoenix, Arizona in early March and ending in Oklahoma City in mid-April. On April 18, 2022, Dylan announced, via his website, the third consecutive U.S. leg of the tour, this time covering the Western United States and running from May 28 to July 6.

On July 13, 2022 Dylan announced the fall leg of the Rough and Rowdy Ways World Wide Tour, encompassing the first dates outside of the United States. This European leg kicked off in Oslo, Norway on September 25 and ended in Dublin, Ireland on November 7.

On February 8, 2023 Dylan announced the first Asian dates of the tour. These first 2023 concerts took place in Japan, beginning on April 6 and concluding on April 20, and comprised multiple shows in Osaka, Tokyo and Nagoya. Starting with the first show of the leg, drummer Jerry Pentecost replaced Charley Drayton.

On March 10, 2023 Dylan announced European tour dates in June and July. This leg of the tour began in Porto, Portugal on June 2 and ended in Rome, Italy on July 9.

On August 21, 2023 Dylan announced North American fall dates for the tour. The first date for this leg was October 1 in Kansas City, MO and the last date was in Evansville, IN on December 3.

On January 22, 2024 Dylan announced the spring leg of the tour, encompassing dates in the American South. The first date for this leg was March 1 in Fort Lauderdale, Florida and the last date was April 6 in Austin, Texas.

On February 27, 2024 it was confirmed that Dylan would appear at Willie Nelson's Outlaw Music Festival Tour, which did not use Rough and Rowdy Ways branding in its advertising and saw Dylan drop all of the Rough and Rowdy Ways songs from his setlists. On July 15, however, Dylan announced that he would be bringing "the Rough and Rowdy Ways tour to Europe and the UK this fall". This leg of the tour began in Prague, Czech Republic on October 4 and ended at the Royal Albert Hall, London, on November 14.

On January 21, 2025, Dylan announced dates for a new U.S. spring tour that was billed as a continuation of the Rough and Rowdy Ways World Wide Tour. This leg of the tour commenced in Tulsa, Oklahoma on March 25, and ended in Williamsport, Pennsylvania on April 22. As in 2024, Dylan dropped the Rough and Rowdy Ways songs from his setlists when playing on Willie Nelson's Outlaw Music Festival Tour during the summer. On July 10, however, Dylan announced a new fall European leg of the Rough and Rowdy Ways World Wide Tour beginning in Helsinki, Finland on October 16 and concluding in Dublin, Ireland on November 25.

On December 8, 2025, Dylan announced dates for a new U.S. spring tour in 2026 that was again billed as a continuation of the Rough and Rowdy Ways World Wide Tour. This leg consisted of 27 dates, beginning in Omaha, Nebraska on March 21 and ending in Abilene, Texas on May 1.

== Set list ==
=== List of songs performed ===
Songs performed

Another Side of Bob Dylan

- "It Ain't Me, Babe" (74)

Bringing It All Back Home

- "It's All Over Now, Baby Blue" (73)

Highway 61 Revisited

- "It Takes a Lot to Laugh, It Takes a Train to Cry" (2)
- "Desolation Row" (74)

Blonde on Blonde

- "Most Likely You Go Your Way and I'll Go Mine" (200)

John Wesley Harding

- "All Along the Watchtower" (32)
- "I'll Be Your Baby Tonight" (226)

Nashville Skyline

- "To Be Alone with You" (275)

Bob Dylan's Greatest Hits Vol. II

- "When I Paint My Masterpiece" (275)

Blood on the Tracks

- "Simple Twist of Fate" (1)

Slow Train Coming

- "Gotta Serve Somebody" (198)

Shot of Love

- "Every Grain of Sand" (270)

Bob Dylan's Greatest Hits Vol. III

- "Dignity" (2)

Time Out of Mind

- "Love Sick" (2)

Love and Theft

- "Tweedle Dee & Tweedle Dum" (4)

Tempest

- "Soon After Midnight" (1)
- "Early Roman Kings" (21)

Fallen Angels

- "Melancholy Mood" (74)
- "That Old Black Magic" (81)

Rough and Rowdy Ways

- "I Contain Multitudes" (276)
- "False Prophet" (276)
- "My Own Version of You" (276)
- "I've Made Up My Mind to Give Myself to You" (276)
- "Black Rider" (276)
- "Goodbye Jimmy Reed" (276)
- "Mother of Muses" (276)
- "Crossing the Rubicon" (255)
- "Key West (Philosopher Pirate)" (276)

Non-album songs

- "Watching the River Flow" (270)

Cover songs

- "Across the Borderline" (1) (Ry Cooder, Jim Dickinson, John Hiatt)
- "Bad Actor" (1) (Merle Haggard, Doug Colosio, Scott Joss)
- "Big River (15) (Johnny Cash)
- "Born in Chicago" (2) (Nick Gravenites)
- "Brokedown Palace" (7) (Jerry Garcia, Robert Hunter)
- "Dance Me to the End of Love (1) (Leonard Cohen)
- "Footlights" (2) (Haggard)
- "Forty Days and Forty Nights" (1) (Bernard Roth)
- "Friend of the Devil" (3) (Garcia, Hunter, John Dawson)
- "Going Down to Bangor" (1) (Van Morrison)
- "I Can't Seem to Say Goodbye" (1) (Don Robertson)
- "Into the Mystic" (1) (Morrison)
- "Jambalaya (On the Bayou)" (1) (Hank Williams)
- "Johnny B. Goode" (1) (Chuck Berry)
- "Kansas City" (1) (Jerry Leiber and Mike Stoller)
- "Killing Floor" (1) (Chester Burnett a.k.a. Howlin' Wolf)
- "The Lakes of Pontchartrain" (1) (traditional)
- "Longest Days" (2) (John Mellencamp)
- "Nadine" (3) (Chuck Berry)
- "New York State of Mind" (One verse) (1) (Billy Joel)
- "Not Fade Away" (9) (Buddy Holly, Norman Petty)
- "Oh! Susanna" (Instrumental snippet) (2) (Stephen Foster)
- "On the Banks of the Old Ponchartrain" (1) (Hank Williams and Ramona Vincent)
- "Only a River" (2) (Bob Weir, Josh Ritter)
- "A Rainy Night in Soho (1) (Shane MacGowan)
- "Roll Over Beethoven (1) (Chuck Berry)
- "The Roving Blade (1) (traditional)
- "South of Cincinnati" (2) (Dwight Yoakam)
- "Stella Blue" (5) (Garcia, Hunter)
- "Truckin'" (7) (Garcia, Hunter, Weir, Phil Lesh)
- "Walking By Myself (8) (Jimmy Rogers)
- "West L.A. Fadeaway" (5) (Garcia, Hunter)

== Tour dates ==
List of 2021 concerts
Date (2021)	City	Country	Venue
November 2	Milwaukee	United States	Riverside Theater
November 3	Chicago	United States	Auditorium Theatre
November 5	Cleveland	United States	KeyBank State Theatre
November 6	Columbus	United States	Palace Theatre
November 7	Bloomington	United States	IU Auditorium
November 9	Cincinnati	United States	Procter & Gamble Hall
November 10	Knoxville	United States	Knoxville Civic Auditorium
November 12	Louisville	United States	Palace Theatre
November 13	Charleston	United States	Charleston Municipal Auditorium
November 15	Moon Township	United States	UPMC Events Center
November 16	Hershey	United States	Hershey Theatre
November 19	New York City	United States	Beacon Theatre
November 20	New York City	United States	Beacon Theatre
November 21	New York City	United States	Beacon Theatre
November 23	Port Chester	United States	Capitol Theatre
November 24	Port Chester	United States	Capitol Theatre
November 26	Providence	United States	Providence Performing Arts Center
November 27	Boston	United States	Wang Theatre
November 29	Philadelphia	United States	The Met
November 30	Philadelphia	United States	The Met
December 2	Washington, D.C.	United States	The Anthem

List of 2022 concerts
Date (2022)	City	Country	Venue
March 3	Phoenix	United States	Arizona Federal Theatre
March 4	Tucson	United States	Tucson Music Hall
March 6	Albuquerque	United States	Kiva Auditorium
March 8	Lubbock	United States	Helen DeVitt Jones Theater
March 10	Irving	United States	Toyota Music Factory
March 11	Sugar Land	United States	Smart Financial Centre
March 13	San Antonio	United States	Majestic Theatre
March 14	San Antonio	United States	Majestic Theatre
March 16	Austin	United States	Bass Concert Hall
March 18	Shreveport	United States	Shreveport Municipal Memorial Auditorium
March 19	New Orleans	United States	Saenger Theatre
March 21	Montgomery	United States	Montgomery Performing Arts Center
March 23	Nashville	United States	Ryman Auditorium
March 24	Atlanta	United States	Fox Theatre
March 26	Savannah	United States	Johnny Mercer Theatre
March 27	North Charleston	United States	North Charleston Performing Arts Center
March 29	Columbia	United States	Columbia Township Auditorium
March 30	Charlotte	United States	Ovens Auditorium
April 1	Greensboro	United States	Steven Tanger Center
April 2	Asheville	United States	Thomas Wolfe Auditorium
April 4	Chattanooga	United States	Tivoli Theatre
April 5	Birmingham	United States	BJCC Concert Hall
April 7	Mobile	United States	Saenger Theatre
April 8	Meridian	United States	Riley Center
April 9	Memphis	United States	Orpheum Theatre
April 11	Little Rock	United States	Robinson Center
April 13	Tulsa	United States	Tulsa Theater
April 14	Oklahoma City	United States	Thelma Gaylord Performing Arts Theater
May 28	Spokane	United States	First Interstate Center for the Arts
May 29	Kennewick	United States	Toyota Center
May 31	Portland	United States	Arlene Schnitzer Concert Hall
June 1	Seattle	United States	Paramount Theatre
June 2	Seattle	United States	Paramount Theatre
June 5	Eugene	United States	Silva Concert Hall
June 7	Redding	United States	Redding Civic Auditorium
June 9	Oakland	United States	Fox Oakland Theatre
June 10	Oakland	United States	Fox Oakland Theatre
June 11	Oakland	United States	Fox Oakland Theatre
June 14	Los Angeles	United States	Pantages Theatre
June 15	Los Angeles	United States	Pantages Theatre
June 16	Los Angeles	United States	Pantages Theatre
June 18	San Diego	United States	San Diego Civic Theatre
June 20	Long Beach	United States	Terrace Theater
June 22	Santa Barbara	United States	Santa Barbara Bowl
June 23	Santa Cruz	United States	Santa Cruz Civic Auditorium
June 25	Sacramento	United States	Sacramento Memorial Auditorium
June 27	Bend	United States	Hayden Homes Amphitheater
June 28	Boise	United States	Morrison Center
June 30	Salt Lake City	United States	Eccles Theater
July 1	Grand Junction	United States	Amphitheater at Las Colonias Park
July 3	Dillon	United States	Dillon Amphitheater
July 5	Denver	United States	Buell Theater
July 6	Denver	United States	Buell Theater
September 25	Oslo	Norway	Oslo Spektrum
September 27	Stockholm	Sweden	Avicii Arena
September 29	Gothenburg	Sweden	Scandinavium
September 30	Copenhagen	Denmark	Royal Arena
October 2	Flensburg	Germany	Flens-Arena
October 3	Magdeburg	Germany	GETEC Arena
October 5	Berlin	Germany	Verti Music Hall
October 6	Berlin	Germany	Verti Music Hall
October 7	Berlin	Germany	Verti Music Hall
October 9	Krefeld	Germany	Yayla Arena
October 11	Paris	France	Grand Rex
October 12	Paris	France	Grand Rex
October 13	Paris	France	Grand Rex
October 15	Brussels	Belgium	Forest National
October 16	Amsterdam	Netherlands	AFAS Live
October 17	Amsterdam	Netherlands	AFAS Live
October 19	London	England	London Palladium
October 20	London	England	London Palladium
October 23	London	England	London Palladium
October 24	London	England	London Palladium
October 26	Cardiff	Wales	Cardiff International Arena
October 27	Hull	England	Bonus Arena
October 28	Nottingham	England	Motorpoint Arena Nottingham
October 30	Glasgow	Scotland	SEC Armadillo
October 31	Glasgow	Scotland	SEC Armadillo
November 2	Manchester	England	O_{2} Apollo Manchester
November 4	Oxford	England	New Theatre Oxford
November 5	Bournemouth	England	Bournemouth International Centre
November 7	Dublin	Ireland	3Arena

List of 2023 concerts
Date (2023)	City	Country	Venue
April 6	Osaka	Japan	Osaka Festival Hall
April 7	Osaka	Japan	Osaka Festival Hall
April 8	Osaka	Japan	Osaka Festival Hall
April 11	Tokyo	Japan	Tokyo Garden Theatre
April 12	Tokyo	Japan	Tokyo Garden Theatre
April 14	Tokyo	Japan	Tokyo Garden Theatre
April 15	Tokyo	Japan	Tokyo Garden Theatre
April 16	Tokyo	Japan	Tokyo Garden Theatre
April 18	Nagoya	Japan	Aichi Prefectural Arts Theater
April 19	Nagoya	Japan	Aichi Prefectural Arts Theater
April 20	Nagoya	Japan	Aichi Prefectural Arts Theater
June 2	Porto	Portugal	Coliseu do Porto
June 4	Lisbon	Portugal	Campo Pequeno Bullring
June 5	Lisbon	Portugal	Campo Pequeno Bullring
June 7 (Note: The June 7 and 8, 2023 concerts in Madrid are part of Noches del Botánico.)	Madrid	Spain	Real Jardín Botánico Alfonso XIII
June 8	Madrid	Spain	Real Jardín Botánico Alfonso XIII
June 10	Seville	Spain	Auditorio Fibes
June 11	Seville	Spain	Auditorio Fibes
June 13 (Note: The June 13, 2023 concert in Granada is part of Festival Internacional de Música y Danza de Granada.)	Granada	Spain	Teatro del Generalife
June 15	Alicante	Spain	Plaza de Toros Alicante
June 19	San Sebastián	Spain	Auditorio Kursaal
June 20	San Sebastián	Spain	Auditorio Kursaal
June 21	Logroño	Spain	Palacio de los Deportes de La Rioja
June 23	Barcelona	Spain	Gran Teatre del Liceu
June 24	Barcelona	Spain	Gran Teatre del Liceu
June 26	Carcassonne	France	Théâtre Jean-Deschamps
June 27	Aix-en-Provence	France	Aréna du Pays d'Aix
June 29	Lyon	France	L'Amphithéâtre Lyon
June 30	Lyon	France	L'Amphithéâtre Lyon
July 1 (Note: The July 1, 2023 concert in Montreux is part of Montreux Jazz Festival.)	Montreux	Switzerland	Auditorium Stravinski
July 3	Milan	Italy	Teatro degli Arcimboldi
July 4	Milan	Italy	Teatro degli Arcimboldi
July 6 (Note: The July 6, 2023 concert in Lucca is part of Lucca Summer Festival.)	Lucca	Italy	Piazza Napoleone
July 7 (Note: The July 7, 2023 concert in Perugia is part of Umbria Jazz Festival.)	Perugia	Italy	Arena Santa Giuliana
July 9	Rome	Italy	Sala Santa Cecilia
October 1	Kansas City	United States	Midland Theatre
October 2	Kansas City	United States	Midland Theatre
October 4	St. Louis	United States	Stifel Theatre
October 6	Chicago	United States	Cadillac Palace Theatre
October 7	Chicago	United States	Cadillac Palace Theatre
October 8	Chicago	United States	Cadillac Palace Theatre
October 11	Milwaukee	United States	Riverside Theater
October 12	Milwaukee	United States	Riverside Theater
October 14	Grand Rapids	United States	DeVos Performance Hall
October 16	Indianapolis	United States	Murat Theatre
October 17	Indianapolis	United States	Murat Theatre
October 20	Cincinnati	United States	Andrew J. Brady Music Center
October 21	Akron	United States	Akron Civic Theatre
October 23	Erie	United States	Warner Theatre
October 24	Rochester	United States	Auditorium Theatre
October 26	Toronto	Canada	Massey Hall
October 27	Toronto	Canada	Massey Hall
October 29	Montreal	Canada	Salle Wilfrid-Pelletier
October 30	Schenectady	United States	Proctor's Theatre
November 3	Boston	United States	Orpheum Theatre
November 4	Boston	United States	Orpheum Theatre
November 5	Boston	United States	Orpheum Theatre
November 7	Port Chester	United States	Capitol Theatre
November 8	Port Chester	United States	Capitol Theatre
November 10	Providence	United States	Providence Performing Arts Center
November 11	Waterbury	United States	Palace Theater
November 12 (Note: The November 12, 2023 concert in Springfield was scheduled to take place on November 1, 2023 but was postponed due to mechanical issues at the venue.)	Springfield	United States	Symphony Hall
November 14	New York City	United States	Kings Theatre Brooklyn
November 15	New York City	United States	Kings Theatre Brooklyn
November 16	New York City	United States	Beacon Theatre
November 19	Philadelphia	United States	Fillmore Philadelphia
November 20	Newark	United States	Prudential Hall
November 21	Newark	United States	Prudential Hall
November 24	Baltimore	United States	Joseph Meyerhoff Symphony Hall
November 25	Baltimore	United States	Joseph Meyerhoff Symphony Hall
November 27	Richmond	United States	Altria Theater
November 29	Roanoke	United States	Berglund Performing Arts Center
November 30	Huntington	United States	Keith-Albee Theatre
December 2	Richmond	United States	EKU Center for the Arts
December 3	Evansville	United States	Old National Events Plaza

List of 2024 concerts
Date (2024)	City	Country	Venue
March 1	Fort Lauderdale	United States	Au-Rene Theater
March 2	Fort Lauderdale	United States	Au-Rene Theater
March 5	Clearwater	United States	Ruth Eckerd Hall
March 6	Clearwater	United States	Ruth Eckerd Hall
March 7	Fort Myers	United States	Suncoast Credit Union Arena
March 9	Orlando	United States	Walt Disney Theater
March 10	Orlando	United States	Walt Disney Theater
March 12	Jacksonville	United States	Moran Theater
March 14	Athens	United States	Classic Center
March 15	Athens	United States	Classic Center
March 17	Charlotte	United States	Belk Theater
March 18	Fayetteville	United States	Crown Theatre
March 21	Asheville	United States	ExploreAsheville.com Arena
March 23	Louisville	United States	Palace Theatre
March 24	Louisville	United States	Palace Theatre
March 26	Nashville	United States	Brooklyn Bowl
March 27	Nashville	United States	Brooklyn Bowl
March 29	Memphis	United States	Orpheum Theatre
March 30	Memphis	United States	Orpheum Theatre
April 1	New Orleans	United States	Saenger Theatre
April 2	Lafayette	United States	Heymann Performing Arts Center
April 4	Dallas	United States	Music Hall at Fair Park
April 5	Austin	United States	ACL Live at Moody Theater
April 6	Austin	United States	ACL Live at Moody Theater
October 4	Prague	Czech Republic	O_{2} Universum
October 5	Prague	Czech Republic	O_{2} Universum
October 6	Prague	Czech Republic	O_{2} Universum
October 8	Erfurt	Germany	Messe Erfurt
October 10	Berlin	Germany	Uber Eats Music Hall
October 11	Berlin	Germany	Uber Eats Music Hall
October 12	Berlin	Germany	Uber Eats Music Hall
October 14	Nuremberg	Germany	Frankenhalle
October 16	Frankfurt	Germany	Jahrhunderthalle
October 17	Frankfurt	Germany	Jahrhunderthalle
October 18	Frankfurt	Germany	Jahrhunderthalle
October 21	Stuttgart	Germany	Porsche-Arena
October 22	Saarbrücken	Germany	Saarlandhalle
October 24	Paris	France	La Seine Musicale
October 25	Paris	France	La Seine Musicale
October 27	Düsseldorf	Germany	Mitsubishi Electric Halle
October 28	Esch-sur-Alzette	Luxembourg	Rockhal
October 29	Antwerp	Belgium	Lotto Arena
November 1	Bournemouth	England	Bournemouth International Centre
November 3	Liverpool	England	M&S Bank Arena
November 5	Edinburgh	Scotland	Usher Hall
November 6	Edinburgh	Scotland	Usher Hall
November 8	Nottingham	England	Motorpoint Arena Nottingham
November 9	Wolverhampton	England	Wolverhampton Civic Hall
November 10	Wolverhampton	England	Wolverhampton Civic Hall
November 12	London	England	Royal Albert Hall
November 13	London	England	Royal Albert Hall
November 14	London	England	Royal Albert Hall

List of 2025 concerts
Date (2025)	City	Country	Venue
March 25	Tulsa	United States	Tulsa Theater
March 26	Little Rock	United States	Robinson Center
March 28	Springfield	United States	Juanita K. Hammons Hall
March 29	Wichita	United States	Century II Concert Hall
March 30	Topeka	United States	Topeka Performing Arts Center
April 1	Omaha	United States	Orpheum Theater
April 2	Sioux City	United States	Orpheum Theatre
April 4	Mankato	United States	Mayo Clinic Health System Event Center
April 5	Eau Claire	United States	Sonnentag Event Center
April 6	Green Bay	United States	Weidner Center for the Performing Arts
April 8	Davenport	United States	Adler Theatre
April 9	Peoria	United States	Prairie Home Alliance Theater
April 11	West Lafayette	United States	Elliott Hall of Music
April 12	Fort Wayne	United States	The Embassy Theatre
April 14	South Bend	United States	Morris Performing Arts Center
April 16	Kalamazoo	United States	Miller Auditorium
April 17	Toledo	United States	Stranahan Theater
April 19	Youngstown	United States	Powers Auditorium
April 21	Pittsburgh	United States	Benedum Center
April 22	Williamsport	United States	Community Arts Center
October 16	Helsinki	Finland	Veikkaus Arena
October 18	Stockholm	Sweden	Avicii Arena
October 21	Copenhagen	Denmark	Royal Arena
October 22	Hamburg	Germany	Barclays Arena
October 24	Lingen	Germany	EmslandArena
October 26	Brussels	Belgium	BOZAR
October 27	Brussels	Belgium	BOZAR
October 28	Brussels	Belgium	BOZAR
October 30	Paris	France	Palais des congrès de Paris
October 31	Paris	France	Palais des congrès de Paris
November 3	Cologne	Germany	Lanxess Arena
November 4	Amsterdam	Netherlands	AFAS Live
November 5	Amsterdam	Netherlands	AFAS Live
November 7	Brighton	England	Brighton Centre
November 9	Swansea	Wales	Swansea Building Society Arena
November 10	Swansea	Wales	Swansea Building Society Arena
November 11	Swansea	Wales	Swansea Building Society Arena
November 13	Coventry	England	Coventry Building Society Arena
November 14	Leeds	England	First Direct Arena
November 16	Glasgow	Scotland	SEC Armadillo
November 17	Glasgow	Scotland	SEC Armadillo
November 19	Belfast	Northern Ireland	Waterfront Hall
November 20	Belfast	Northern Ireland	Waterfront Hall
November 23	Killarney	Ireland	Gleneagle Arena
November 24	Killarney	Ireland	Gleneagle Arena
November 25	Dublin	Ireland	3Arena

List of 2026 concerts
Date (2026)	City	Country	Venue
March 21	Omaha	United States	Orpheum Theatre
March 22	Sioux Falls	United States	Mary W. Sommervold Hall
March 24	Rochester	United States	Mayo Civic Center
March 25	Iowa City	United States	Hancher Auditorium
March 27	La Crosse	United States	La Crosse Center
March 28	Rockford	United States	Coronado Theatre
March 30	Waukegan	United States	Genesee Theatre
March 31	Muncie	United States	Emens Auditorum
April 2	Grand Rapids	United States	DeVos Performance Hall
April 3	Saginaw	United States	The Theater
April 4	Detroit	United States	Detroit Masonic Temple
April 6	Louisville	United States	The Louisville Palace
April 9	Columbus	United States	Palace Theatre
April 10	Cleveland	United States	KeyBank State Theatre
April 12	Dayton	United States	Winsupply Theatre
April 14	Knoxville	United States	Knoxville Civic Auditorum
April 16	Bowling Green	United States	Southern Kentucky Performing Arts Center
April 17	Chattanooga	United States	Soldiers and Sailors Memorial Auditorium
April 19	Asheville	United States	Thomas Wolfe Auditorium
April 20	Spartanburg	United States	Spartanburg Memorial Auditorium
April 22	Macon	United States	Macon City Auditorium
April 23	Dothan	United States	Dothan Civic Center
April 25	Jackson	United States	Thalia Mara Hall
April 27	Baton Rouge	United States	Raising Cane's Theatre for the Performing Arts
April 28	Shreveport	United States	Shreveport Municipal Memorial Auditorium
April 29	Tyler	United States	Cowan Center
May 1	Abilene	United States	Abilene Auditorium

=== Cancelled shows ===
Date (2023)	City	Country	Venue	Cause
June 17	Huesca	Spain	Plaza de Toros de Huesca	Extreme weather.

== Band ==
- Bob Dylan – vocals, piano, guitar, harmonica
- Bob Britt – guitar
- Charley Drayton – drums (2021–2022)
- Tony Garnier – bass guitar
- Donnie Herron – accordion, violin, electric mandolin, pedal steel guitar and lap steel guitar (2021-2024)
- Doug Lancio – guitar
- Jerry Pentecost – drums (2023–2024)
- Jim Keltner - drums (2024)
- Anton Fig - drums (2025)
