= Eric Appapoulay =

British singer and guitarist (born 1971)

- Born: Eric Anthony Appapoulay; 21 December 1971 (age 54); London, England
- Occupations: Record producer; songwriter; musician; remixer
- Instruments: Guitar; bass; drums and percussion; piano; keyboards
- Years active: 1998–present
- Labels: 679; Atlantic; V2
- Website: thesanctuarystudio.co.uk

Eric Anthony Appapoulay (born 21 December 1971) is a British singer, songwriter, composer, arranger, programmer, multi-instrumentalist and guitarist. Appapoulay has been the guitar player for Neneh Cherry, the musical director for Daniel Bedingfield, the bassist for both Plan B and Nitin Sawhney, and the performing artist on the debut album Faith is Trust. Appapoulay is also currently the guitarist with Yusuf Islam. He is the co-owner of The Sanctuary Recording Studio in London, and member of SMV known for their work on the 2010 award-winning Plan B album, The Defamation of Strickland Banks.

== History ==
Appapoulay was born in East London to Mauritian parents. He has two siblings named Maryse Appapoulay and Caroline Appapoulay. He began playing (sega) traditional music from Mauritius at age eight alongside reggae, calypso, soca and high life. He studied classical guitar privately, inspired by John Williams. He listened to flamenco guitar, Paco de Lucia, also blues, rock and country, and artists such as B.B. King, Eric Clapton, Jimi Hendrix, Carlos Santana, Kelly Joe Phelps and Mark Knopfler. Much later jazz/fusion influences from George Benson, Earl Klugh, Larry Carlton, Robin Ford, Pat Metheny, Bireli Lagrene and Scott Henderson.

== Career ==
=== Production ===
He was a composer with Lounge Productions in the UK. In 2006, he set up The Sanctuary Recording Studio with partner David McEwan.

With a career in the music industry for over 25 years he has worked with many artists that include: Yusuf, Neneh Cherry, Daniel & Natasha Bedingfield, Craig David, Keri Hilson, Jason Derulo, Lionel Richie, Don Blackman, Beverley Knight, Lucie Silvas, Nitin Sawhney, MPHO, Patrice Bart-Williams, Terri Walker, Nate James, Tackhead, Anette Peacock, Ola, New Sector Movements, Liquid Biskit, Zen Badism, Jhelisa Anderson, Glen Scott, Wisechildren, Colin Emmanuel, Jimmy Dawkins, DJ Pogo, Mc Ty, Jonzi D, Manifest, Wunmi, Kojo Antwi, Vikter Duplait, Eska Mtungwasi, Marcina Arnold, Natalie Williams, Julie Dexter.

Appapoulay was the touring Guitarist for Neneh Cherry in 1992, Musical director for New Sector Movements in 1997, Bass player for Nitin Sawhney between 1998–2000, Musical director for Daniel Bedingfield's band between 2000–2006, Co-writer of the song "Do Ya" with Lionel Richie for his 2004 album 'Just For You', touring Guitarist for Natasha Bedingfield in 2007 and Craig David between 2007–2008. He toured with Patrice between 2008–2010 and Yusuf since 2008 and undertook a tour of Europe in May 2011 with Yusuf (aka Cat Stevens) as a guitarist and lead vocalist.

He also produced tracks for British MC/Singer Plan B for his number 1 award-winning album The Defamation of Strickland Banks, including the top 10 single "She Said". He was the bass player for 90% of the Plan B's album alongside Jodi Milner, and also did backing vocals, piano and additional guitars. The bulk of the material on The Defamation of Strickland Banks was recorded by Eric Appapoulay and co-owner David McEwan at their own studio in South London, The Sanctuary Recording Studio. Partly because they were simultaneously working on its hip-hop counterpart.

=== Making of the album ===
Prominent in both The Sanctuary Recording Studio and on The Defamation of Strickland Banks is Appapoulay's upright piano. Ben Drew explained that "Because of how old it is, and some things are slightly out of tune, it reminded me of those old hip-hop records where the sampled piano does sound a little but gritty," "That's why I loved it. It looks great and it's got a proper resonance."

In a SOS interview, Appapoulay described their process during recording sessions: "It was just Ben and myself and Richard and Tom. We would be in the room together, Ben’d be on his acoustic guitar in that little doorway bit with his mic, setting down the guides. I had guitar in the Fender Twin, drums just clean, and then the bass I put through the LA2A, because I love the way it warms it up. Then we were using the bass amp as well, because we had the whole band in one room — the control room was in the drum room that you see now — so we were jamming like in a rehearsal. It had a band feeling, like Motown, where they just used to sit in one room and record together. That was the idea with this place, I wanted the whole band to feel like it was a gig scenario, playing as a band."

After the album's completion it shot to the top of the European charts, won several awards in 2010, and is nominated for February 2011's Brit Award for two awards including the MasterCard British Album of the Year.

== Discography ==
=== Vocals ===
- 2000 Various – Adventures in Clubland 1990-99: The Stress Decade (Stress Records)
- 2006 Marcina Arnold – Introducing (Counterpoint Records)

=== Instruments and performance ===
- 1994 Interference – Global Game (Blanc Records, Trinity Worldwide Records)
- 1996 Various – Audium Capsule 1 (Blanc Records)
- 1997 Gary Barlow – So Help Me Girl (BMG UK & Ireland)
- 2000 New Sector Movements – No Tricks EP (Virgin)
- 2000 Murky Waters – Check Yourself (Main Squeeze)
- 2000 Various – Family Planning Vol 1 (Main Squeeze)
- 2000 Friends From Rio – Cravo E Canela (Remixes By IG Culture) (Far Out Recordings)
- 2000 Likwid Biskit – Substance (People Records)
- 2001 New Sector Movements – Download This (Virgin)
- 2002 Quite Sane – Child of Troubled Times (CoolHunter Music)
- 2003 Ty – Upwards (Big Dada Recordings)
- 2003 Ma Futura Feat. Hylton Smith* – Penny Dun Drop (Main Squeeze)
- 2003 Various – Family Planning Vol. 2 Sampler (Main Squeeze)
- 2004 Daniel Bedingfield – Wrap My Words Around You (Polydor)
- 2004 NSM – Turn It Up (Virgin)
- 2004 Daniel Bedingfield – Nothing Hurts Like Love (Polydor)
- 2004 Daniel Bedingfield – Second First Impression (Polydor)
- 2005 Gilles Peterson – Gilles Peterson Presents – The BBC Sessions (Ether Records)
- 2005 Mpho Skeef – Don't Like You (Documented)
- 2005 Colin Emmanuel – Dámelo (Little League Productions)
- 2005 Colin Emmanuel – D'Illusions of Grandeur (Little League Productions)
- 2005 Daniel Bedingfield – The Way / Ain't Nobody (Polydor)
- 2006 Marcina Arnold – Introducing (Counterpoint Records)
- 2010 Plan B – The Defamation of Strickland Banks (679/Atlantic)
- 2010 Plan B – She Said (679 Recordings)
- 2010 Selah Sue – Raggamuffin (Because Music)

=== Writing and arrangement ===
- 1996 Various – Eclectro (Anti Static Recordings)
- 1996 Various – Audium Capsule 1 (Blanc Records)
- 2003 Various – Family Planning Vol. 2 Sampler (Main Squeeze)

=== Featuring and presenting ===
- 2000 Various – Co-Operation Volume 1 (Co-Operation Recordings)
- 2001 Ty – The Nonsense (Big Dada Recordings)
- 2001 Ty – Awkward (Big Dada Recordings)

=== Production ===
- 2000 Julie Dexter – Peace of Mind (Blackbyrd)
