= Love Goes Down =

Single by Plan B

from the album The Defamation of Strickland Banks
- Released: 2010
- Recorded: 2009; The Sanctuary, London
- Genre: Soul
- Length: 3:51
- Label: 679/Atlantic
- Songwriter: Ben Drew
- Producers: Ben Drew, David McEwan, Eric Appapoulay (add.)

Plan B singles chronology
"The Recluse" (2010)	"Love Goes Down" (2010)	"Writing's on the Wall" (2011)

"Love Goes Down" is the fifth single from British songwriter and rapper Plan B's second studio album, The Defamation of Strickland Banks. The single was released on 2010. HiveMag said of the song: "It’s delightfully soulful and gentle, especially in contrast with some of Plan B’s earlier records. It’s a nice wind-down song. It’s peaceful; it’s relaxing and perfect for this time of year. Yes it may be different and maybe we shouldn’t like it, but the vintage sounding, Motown-like track just seems to work. It’s different but I admire artists that experiment with their sound and adapt to new sounds."

== Music video ==
The music video for "Love Goes Down" was directed by Daniel Wolfe. It features Strickland Banks performing the song on a television programme. The video also uses clips of Banks' day-to-day life and ends with the television programme cutting the song before it finishes, leaving Banks furious as he knocks the microphone stand to the floor and walks off and is arrested by the police.

== Track listing ==
- UK CD single
1. "Love Goes Down" - 3:51
- UK Promotional CD single
1. "Love Goes Down" (Doctor P Remix) – 5:08
2. "Love Goes Down" (Doctor P Dub) – 5:08
3. "Love Goes Down" (Doctor P Remix Edit) – 3:47
4. "Love Goes Down" (Danny Byrd Remix) – 4:42
5. "Love Goes Down" (Danny Byrd Instrumental) – 4:42
6. "Love Goes Down" (Danny Byrd Remix Edit) – 3:09
- Digital download - Remix
1. "Love Goes Down" (Doctor P Remix) – 5:08
- Digital download - Remix
1. "Love Goes Down" (Danny Byrd Remix) – 4:42

== Personnel ==
- Plan B – vocals, producer

Production

- David McEwan – producer
- Eric Appapoulay – additional producer
- Mark "Top" Rankin – engineer, mixing
- Harry Escott – string arrangements
- Sally Herbert – string arrangements
- Jason Yarde – brass arrangements

== Charts ==
Chart (2010–2011)	Peak position
German Youth Airplay Chart	47
UK Singles (OCC)	62

== Certifications ==
Region	Certification	Certified units/sales
United Kingdom (BPI)	Silver	200,000^{‡}
^{‡} Sales+streaming figures based on certification alone.
