= Shadow Kingdom =

2023 studio album by Bob Dylan

Studio album / soundtrack album by Bob Dylan
- Released: June 2, 2023
- Recorded: 2021
- Studio: Village Recorder (West Los Angeles)
- Genre: Folk rock
- Length: 54:00
- Label: Columbia

Bob Dylan chronology
| The Bootleg Series Vol. 17: Fragments – Time Out of Mind Sessions (1996–1997) (2023) | Shadow Kingdom (2023) | The Complete Budokan 1978 (2023) |

Bob Dylan studio album chronology
| Rough and Rowdy Ways (2020) | Shadow Kingdom (2023) |

Singles from Shadow Kingdom
- 1. "Watching the River Flow" Released: April 13, 2023

Shadow Kingdom is the fortieth studio album and second soundtrack album by American singer-songwriter Bob Dylan, released on June 2, 2023, through Columbia Records. The songs were recorded at Village Recorder in West Los Angeles in early 2021 to accompany Alma Har'el's film Shadow Kingdom: The Early Songs of Bob Dylan, which was shot later. Although no musicians are listed in the credits, various sources have identified the session players as consisting of veterans such as T Bone Burnett and Don Was. It is the first album in which Dylan plays with a band that features no drums or percussion.

Shadow Kingdom consists of new recordings of 13 songs from the first half of Dylan's career plus a new instrumental track titled "Sierra's Theme". The album was preceded by a single for "Watching the River Flow", which was released on streaming platforms and as a YouTube video on April 13, 2023. The performance of "Forever Young" from Har'el's film was released as a standalone video on June 2, 2023. The album received universal praise from critics.

== Packaging ==
The album's cover photograph is a black-and-white still image of Bob Dylan playing the harmonica taken from the film Shadow Kingdom: The Early Songs of Bob Dylan, directed by Alma Har'el and shot by Lol Crawley. The graphic design is credited to Geoff Gans.

== Critical reception ==
Professional ratings
Aggregate scores
| Source | Rating |
|---|---|
| Metacritic | 84/100 |
Review scores
| Source | Rating |
| AllMusic | 4/5 stars |
| American Songwriter | 4/5 stars |
| Clash Music | 8/10 stars |
| The Daily Telegraph | 5/5 stars |
| Exclaim! | 8/10 stars |
| Far Out | 4.5/5 stars |
| The Line of Best Fit | 8/10 stars |
| Mojo | 4/5 stars |
| The Spill Magazine | 8/10 stars |
| Uncut | 4/5 stars |

Shadow Kingdom was released to widespread critical acclaim, receiving an average score of 84 on review aggregator Metacritic.

A Rolling Stone review by Michaelangelo Matos named Shadow Kingdom one of the "Hear This" recommended albums for the month of June 2023, claiming that Dylan makes his classic songs "seem stunningly brand new".

A review by Scott Bauer of the Associated Press praised the arrangements, noting how the "heavy dose of accordion and no drums" make the songs "sound fresh again". Bauer also claimed that the album "stands as a good retort for all the naysayers who have argued, seemingly from day one, that Dylan can't sing. The subdued arrangements are perfect for Dylan's well-weathered, unfairly maligned voice".

The Daily Telegraph's Neil McCormick gave the album a five out of five star rating and wrote: "[...] what an absolute joy it is, in which the grand old man of songcraft flips through his own back pages with genuine relish, a man in his 80s revisiting the words of his firebrand youth and finding entirely new meanings there."

Writing in Uncut, Richard Williams rated the album four out of five stars, arguing that its sound seemingly grew out of Dylan's previous album Rough and Rowdy Ways. Williams called the music a "loose, fluid instrumental mesh" and described how "slow swells of accordion, acoustic guitars and bowed string bass" underline "the carefully articulated front-and-centre vocal".

Mojo's John Mulvey likewise gave the album four out of five stars, calling it "an extremely useful addition to the Dylan catalogue" and highlighted the performance of "What Was It You Wanted" as "particularly impressive" for its "gravitas".

Tim Cumming, writing at The Arts Desk, noted that the "best song performances – "Queen Jane Approximately", "Just Like Tom Thumb's Blues" and "Tombstone Blues" from Highway 61, a poignant "Forever Young" and a killer version of "What Was It You Wanted", one I may never hear bettered – make this required listening when it comes to later-period Bob, a rare look back in studio conditions, and from a high point in his career".

Paul Sinclair, writing at the Super Deluxe Edition website, called it "a record for Dylan diehards to treasure – the latest of several releases by him that are essential purchases".

Reviewing the album for Hot Press, Pat Carty praised the way "Monumental song writing achievements have the patina of familiarity and reverence blown off them and are allowed to be heard anew. This arrangement of 'Just Like Tom Thumb's Blues' – to offer just one example – transports the song forwards (and backwards) in time from the wild, hipper-than-anyone-has-ever-been, frazzled Godhead of Highway 61 Revisited to the calmer when-you're-lost-in-the-rain-in-Juarez environs of the Pat Garrett & Billy the Kid soundtrack".

Singer/songwriter Elliott Murphy cited Dylan's performance of "Most Likely You Go Your Way and I'll Go Mine" on this album as one of his top 10 songs of the 21st century in an article for Poetic Justice Magazine.

=== Accolades ===
Accolades for Shadow Kingdom
| Publication | Accolade | Rank |
|---|---|---|
| Forbes | 2023 Archival Releases So Far | N/A |
| Metacritic | Best Albums of 2023 | 74 |
| Rolling Stone | The Best Albums of 2023 So Far | N/A |
| Ultimate Classic Rock | Top 10 Reissues of 2023 | 10 |

== Commercial performance ==
Shadow Kingdom debuted at number 71 on the Billboard 200 but was the seventh best-selling album in the US during its first week of release based on pure album sales. The album charted in at least 19 countries and reached the top 10 in Austria, Belgium, Finland, Germany, Scotland and Switzerland.

== Track listing ==
=== CD edition ===
All tracks are written by Bob Dylan.

Shadow Kingdom track listing
| No. | Title | Length |
|---|---|---|
| 1. | "When I Paint My Masterpiece" | 4:25 |
| 2. | "Most Likely You Go Your Way and I'll Go Mine" | 3:32 |
| 3. | "Queen Jane Approximately" | 5:14 |
| 4. | "I'll Be Your Baby Tonight" | 3:04 |
| 5. | "Just Like Tom Thumb's Blues" | 4:26 |
| 6. | "Tombstone Blues" | 5:00 |
| 7. | "To Be Alone with You" | 3:10 |
| 8. | "What Was It You Wanted" | 5:03 |
| 9. | "Forever Young" | 3:15 |
| 10. | "Pledging My Time" | 3:50 |
| 11. | "The Wicked Messenger" | 2:56 |
| 12. | "Watching the River Flow" | 3:00 |
| 13. | "It's All Over Now, Baby Blue" | 2:49 |
| 14. | "Sierra's Theme" | 4:23 |
| Total length: | | 54:00 |

=== Vinyl edition ===
Side A
| No. | Title | Length |
|---|---|---|
| 1. | "When I Paint My Masterpiece" | 4:25 |
| 2. | "Most Likely You Go Your Way and I'll Go Mine" | 3:32 |
| 3. | "Queen Jane Approximately" | 5:14 |
| 4. | "I'll Be Your Baby Tonight" | 3:04 |

Side B
| No. | Title | Length |
|---|---|---|
| 1. | "Just Like Tom Thumb's Blues" | 4:26 |
| 2. | "Tombstone Blues" | 5:00 |
| 3. | "To Be Alone with You" | 3:10 |
| 4. | "What Was It You Wanted" | 5:03 |

Side C
| No. | Title | Length |
|---|---|---|
| 1. | "Forever Young" | 3:15 |
| 2. | "Pledging My Time" | 3:50 |
| 3. | "The Wicked Messenger" | 2:56 |
| 4. | "Watching the River Flow" | 3:00 |
| 5. | "It's All Over Now, Baby Blue" | 2:49 |
| 6. | "Sierra's Theme" | 4:23 |

== Personnel ==
- Bob Dylan – vocals, guitar, harmonica
- Jeff Taylor – accordion, dolceola
- Greg Leisz – guitar, pedal steel guitar, mandolin
- Tim Pierce – guitar
- T-Bone Burnett – guitar
- Ira Ingber – guitar
- Don Was – upright bass
- John Avila – electric bass
- Doug Lacy – accordion
- Steve Bartek – additional acoustic guitar

== Charts ==
Chart performance for Shadow Kingdom
| Chart (2023) | Peak position |
|---|---|
| Australian Albums (ARIA) | 56 |
| Austrian Albums (Ö3 Austria) | 4 |
| Belgian Albums (Ultratop Flanders) | 10 |
| Belgian Albums (Ultratop Wallonia) | 37 |
| Danish Albums (Hitlisten) | 34 |
| Dutch Albums (Album Top 100) | 13 |
| Finnish Albums (Suomen virallinen lista) | 10 |
| French Albums (SNEP) | 82 |
| German Albums (Offizielle Top 100) | 10 |
| Irish Albums (Official Charts) | 21 |
| Italian Albums (FIMI) | 70 |
| Japanese Albums (Oricon) | 18 |
| Japanese Combined Albums (Oricon) | 38 |
| Japanese Hot Albums (Billboard Japan) | 21 |
| Japanese Rock Albums (Oricon) | 3 |
| New Zealand Albums (RMNZ) | 19 |
| Norwegian Albums (VG-lista) | 40 |
| Portuguese Albums (AFP) | 24 |
| Scottish Albums (Official Charts) | 3 |
| Spanish Albums (Promusicae) | 27 |
| Swedish Albums (Sverigetopplistan) | 22 |
| Swiss Albums (Schweizer Hitparade) | 3 |
| UK Albums (Official Charts) | 14 |
| US Billboard 200 | 71 |
