= Erik Rico =

American singer (died 2025)

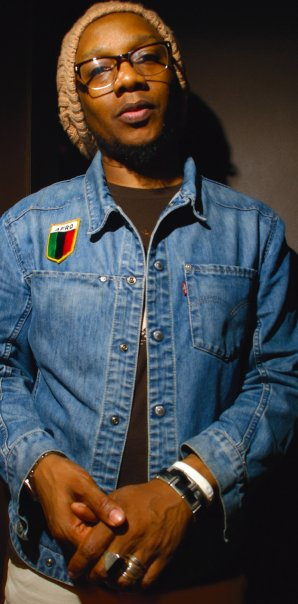
- Rico in 2009

Background information
- Born: North Carolina, U.S.
- Died: July 2025
- Genres: Soul; house; dancehall; reggae; electro; hip hop; nu jazz; experimental
- Occupations: Musician; singer; songwriter; producer; DJ; label owner
- Instruments: Guitar; bass guitar; piano; keyboard; drums; percussion
- Years active: 1997–2025
- Labels: LifeNotes Music; Columbia; ClubStar Ibiza; Tokyo Dawn; SoulfulBeats
- Website: lifenotesmusic

Erik Rico (died July 2025) was an American musician, singer, songwriter, producer and DJ.

== Life and career ==
Rico was born in North Carolina and raised between New York and North Carolina.

In 1997, Rico was signed by Columbia Records executive Randy Jackson. He has written and produced music for Jurassic 5, Planet Asia, 4th Avenue Jones and Ladybug Mecca (Digable Planets). In 2001, he wrote and produced for Q-Tip (A Tribe Called Quest), Jasmine Guy, Malcolm Jamal Warner, and Tre' (The Pharcyde) on Tupac Shakur's The Rose that Grew from Concrete for Amaru/Interscope Records. As a DJ, he was hired as a sound designer for artist/photographer David LaChapelle.

Between 2007 and 2011, Rico toured Morocco, Tunisia, Algeria, Indonesia and the Islamic Society of North America convention as a member of the Hip Hop Ambassador program, an extension of the Remarkable Current Music Collective, sponsored by the United States' State Department's Performance Arts Initiative, a program to present positive examples of African American musicians to the international community.

On August 1, 2013, Rico released Love's Dance Vol. 1, which includes various styles of dance music.

On October 19, 2025, it was announced that Rico died several months prior, in late July.

== Discography ==
=== Albums ===
- Life in Volcanoes – Povi (Carmen Rizzo) – producer/co-writer (Nettwerk Records, 2000)
- The Rose that Grew from Concrete – Tupac Shakur – producer/writer (Amaru/Interscope Records, 2001)
- No plan B – 4th Avenue Jones – producer/co-writer (Look Alive/Interscope Records, 2002)
- Still in Training – Planet Asia – producer/co-writer (Liquor Barrell, 2003)
- Journey Back To Me (LifeNotes Music, 2007)
- Higher Frequency (LifeNotes Music, 2009)
- Love's Dance, Vol. 1 (LifeNotes Music, 2013)

=== Singles ===
- "Do Re Mi" – 4th Avenue Jones – producer/co-writer (Interscope Records, 2002)
- "The Life – Remix" – Mystic (Goodvibe/Interscope Recordings, 2003)
- "Linguistics" – Jurassic 5 – producer/co-writer (Up Above Records, 2005)
- "Sometimes" – Ladybug Mecca (Digable Planets) – producer/co-writer (Nu Paradigm Entertainment, 2005)
- "Coming Up" – Dave Ghetto – producer/co-writer (Counterflow Recordings, 2005)
- "Wonderful" – Erik Rico (Columbia Records Japan, 2007)
- "Melody" – DJ Spinna & Erik Rico (Highwater, 2009)
- "Sweetest Taboo" – Sade/Erik Rico, (LifeNotes Music, 2009)
- "Special Kind of Fool" – TY, feat. Erik Rico (BBE Records, 2010)
- "Sensation" – Ron Trent & Erik Rico (FutureVision Records, 2010)
- "Everybody" – Grooveman Spot, feat. Erik Rico (Planet Groove/Jazzy Sport Japan, 2010)
- "Just Love" – Erik Rico/Marc Mac (4hero) feat. on the compilation The Heart Vol. 2 (Tokyo Dawn Records, 2011)
- "Our World" – Opolopo (Deep house remix) (Tokyo Dawn Records, 2011)
- "My Prayer" – Erik Rico (LifeNotes Music, 2012)
- "Under The Sun" – Erik Rico/Missoles (ManyVibes Music, 2012)
- "Babylon" – LifeNotes Sound System (LifeNotes Music, 2012)
- "So Sexy" – Gus, feat. Erik Rico (LifeNotes Music, 2013)
- "Dance With Me" – Erik Rico/Nicolas Vautier (ClubStar, 2013)
- "Start This Party" – R. Schneider, feat. Erik Rico (Epoque Music, 2013)
- "So Divine" – Erik Rico (LifeNotes Music, 2013)
- "Penny" – Erik Rico (LifeNotes Music, 2013)
- "Grown Man Hustle" – Shabaam Sahdeeq feat. Erik Rico (Below System Records, 2014)
- "Through The Night" – Jonna lliffe, feat. Erik Rico (City Fly/Shadeleaf, 2016)

=== Film and television ===
- They Call Me Sirr (The Sirr Parker Story) (Showtime Network, 2003)
- Night at the Grand Star (PBS original series documentary, 2003)
