= Prayin' (Plan B song) =

2010 single by Plan B

Single by Plan B

from the album The Defamation of Strickland Banks
- Released: 9 July 2010
- Recorded: 2009; Miloco Studios, London
- Genre: Soul
- Length: 3:47
- Label: 679/Atlantic
- Songwriter: Ben Drew
- Producer: Paul Epworth

Plan B singles chronology
"She Said" (2010)	"Prayin'" (2010)	"The Recluse" (2010)

"Prayin'" is the third single from British rapper Plan B's second album The Defamation of Strickland Banks – a concept album whose songs tell the fictitious tale of a sharp-suited British soul singer who finds fame with bitter-sweet love songs, but then loses everything when he ends up in prison for a crime he didn't commit. The single was released as a digital download and on CD single on July 9, 2010.

== Background ==
The music video for "Prayin'" was directed by Daniel Wolfe and shows Strickland Banks during his time in prison. Another inmate was played by British rapper Skrein. It was first aired on YouTube on 28 May 2010. Plan B performed the single on Alan Carr: Chatty Man on 20 June 2010. He also performed "Prayin'" along with various other songs as part of Glastonbury Festival 2010 on 25 June 2010, in which he performed on the East Dance Stage; and the song again on the Pyramid stage at the next year's festival. In the 2011 Glastonbury appearance, Plan B both "manage[d] to project emotional fragility [and had the] ... vast crowd cheerily singing along," according to one reviewer.

== Chart performance ==
"Prayin'" debuted on the UK R&B Chart at number 40 on 20 June 2010 before climbing to number 18 the following week. That same week, "Prayin'" debuted on the UK Singles Chart at number 46. On 4 July 2010, the single rose to number 15 and 36 on the R&B and Singles Chart respectively, giving Plan B his third consecutive Top 40 hit. On its second week in the Top 40, the single climbed 12 places to number 24 and number 11 on the R&B Chart. Upon physical release, the single climbed to number 17 and number 7 on the respective charts on 18 July 2010. The following week, the single climbed a single place to its current peak of number 16. The single has sold over 126,500 copies in the UK. The single debuted on the Irish Singles Chart at number 42 on 15 July 2010, marking Plan B's second consecutive hit in the country after "She Said" reached number 2. On its second week in the chart, the single climbed 8 places to a current peak of number 34 before falling 3 places to number 37 on 29 July 2010.

== Track listing ==
- UK CD single
1. "Prayin'" – 3:47
2. "Prayin'" (Breakage's Bad Week Remix) – 5:34
3. "Prayin'" (Riva Starr Remix) – 8:00
- UK Promotional CD single
1. "Prayin'" (Breakage's Bad Week Remix) – 5:34
2. "Prayin'" (Breakage's Bad Week Edit) – 3:21
3. "Prayin'" (Riva Starr Remix) – 8:00
4. "Prayin'" (Riva Starr Edit) – 4:02
5. "Prayin'" (Riva Starr Dub) – 8:03
6. "Prayin'" – 3:47
- UK 12" vinyl
1. "Prayin'" (Chase & Status Remix) – 3:26
2. "Prayin'" (Breakage's Bad Week Remix) – 5:34
3. "Prayin'" (Riva Starr Remix) – 8:00
4. "Prayin'" (Boy Kid Cloud and Faith SFX Remix) – 4:20
- Digital download
1. "Prayin'" – 3:47
- Digital download – EP
1. "Prayin'" (Chase & Status Remix) – 3:26
2. "Prayin'" (Breakage's Bad Week Remix) – 5:34
3. "Prayin'" (RAK Version) – 4:13
4. "Prayin'" (Riva Starr Remix) – 8:00
5. "Prayin'" (Boy Kid Cloud and Faith SFX Remix) – 4:20

== Personnel ==
- Plan B – vocals

Production

- Paul Epworth – producer, mixing
- Mark "Top" Rankin – engineer

Additional musicians

- Tom Wright-Goss – guitar
- Eric Appapoulay – bass
- Richard Cassell – drums
- Uncredited – orchestra

== Charts ==
Chart (2010)	Peak position
Belgium (Ultratip Bubbling Under Flanders)	24
Ireland (IRMA)	34
UK Singles (Official Charts)	16
UK Hip Hop/R&B (Official Charts)	6

=== Year-end charts ===
Chart (2010)	Position
UK Singles (Official Charts Company)	146

== Release history ==
Region	Date	Format	Label
United Kingdom	9 July 2010	Digital download, CD single	679 Recordings
