= Malik Hassan Sayeed =

American film director (born 1969)

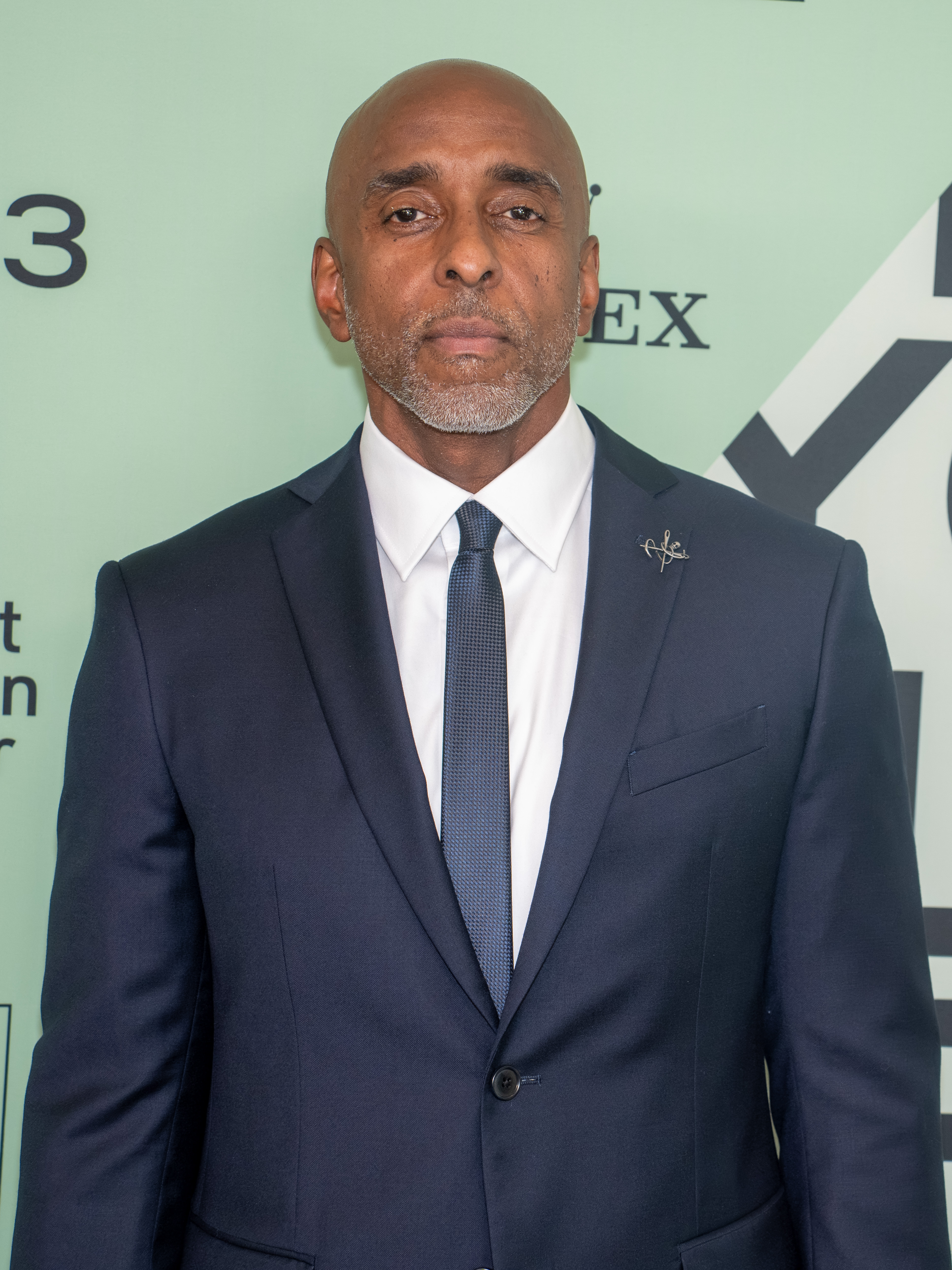
- Sayeed in 2025
- Born: 1969 (age 56–57); New York City
- Education: Howard University

Malik Hassan Sayeed is an American cinematographer, producer and director.

He has worked on films directed by Spike Lee, Hype Williams, and Luca Guadagnino, and has also contributed to music videos including Lauryn Hill's "Ex-Factor", Kanye West's "Gold Digger" featuring Jamie Foxx, and Beyoncé's "Formation".

== Education ==
Sayeed graduated from Howard University in 1990 with a degree in Film Studies. Notably, he studied under leading member of the L.A. Rebellion Haile Gerima. He also attended the Maine Photographic Workshops.

== Career ==
Sayeed was a second unit director of photography on Stanley Kubrick's Eyes Wide Shut and Andrew Niccol's Gattaca and was the cinematographer for Hype Williams' Belly and Spike Lee's The Original Kings of Comedy, Girl 6, He Got Game and Clockers.

Sayeed had served on the electrical crews for Spike Lee's Malcolm X and Crooklyn before Lee promoted him to director of photography for Clockers. Prior to this promotion, Sayeed had worked on music videos with Hype Williams and television commercials with Lee. Three years after Clockers, he served as director of photography for Belly. As of 2023, this was his last dramatic feature to be released. Though Sayeed has continued working in music, notably directing or serving as cinematographer for videos like Lauryn Hill's "Ex-Factor," D'Angelo's "Left & Right," and Beyonce's "Formation" and "Brown Skin Girl."

After working with Arthur Jafa (cinematographer for Crooklyn) on Seven Songs for Malcolm X, Sayeed and Jafa started to develop a closer relationship. In 2014, Sayeed along with Jafa and Elissa Blount Moorhead launched TNEG, an independent film studio and production company with the goal of creating a "Black cinema as culturally, socially, and economically central to the 21st century as was Black music to the 20th century."

== Filmography ==
Film

Year	Title	Director
1995	Clockers	Spike Lee
1996	Girl 6	Spike Lee
1997	Cold Around the Heart	John Ridley
1998	The Players Club	Ice Cube
1998	He Got Game	Spike Lee
1998	Belly	Hype Williams
2025	After the Hunt	Luca Guadagnino
2026	Artificial	Luca Guadagnino

Television

Year	Title	Director	Notes
1995	Real Sports with Bryant Gumbel	Spike Lee; Jeff Winn	Episode "Coach/The Longest Season/The Money Trail"
1998	John Leguizamo: Freak	Spike Lee	Stand-up comedy
2011	Da Brick	Spike Lee	TV pilot

Documentary film

Year	Title	Director	Notes
2000	The Original Kings of Comedy	Spike Lee	
2001	Life and Debt	Stephanie Black	With Kyle Kibbe, Richard Lannaman and Alex Nepomniaschy
2014	Dreams Are Colder Than Death	Arthur Jafa	With Hans Charles and Arthur Jafa
2015	The Reflektor Tapes	Kahlil Joseph	With Lol Crawley and Autumn Durald Arkapaw
2027	Compton's Finest	Cle Sloan	

== Awards ==
In 1999, Sayeed was nominated for an Independent Spirit Award: Best Cinematography for Belly (1998) He has won MTV Video Music Awards for "Formation" and "Brown Skin Girl" amongst other music videos.
