= Elissa Blount Moorhead =

American producer

Elissa Blount Moorhead (sometimes spelled Blount-Moorhead) is a Baltimore-based producer, artist, writer, curator, and lecturer. She is an advocate for social change through her interdisciplinary work in visual art, music, design, and film. She has produced public art events, gallery exhibitions, film screenings, and education programs since the early 90s.

== Education and background ==
Blount Moorhead was born and raised in Brooklyn, New York.

She lived in the Bedford-Stuyvesant neighborhood in Brooklyn, NY before moving to Baltimore, Maryland in 2014. She studied at the Syracuse University College of Law and received her degree in 1993, and later received her MFA in Interior Design at Parsons School of Design in 2007. She has two children, Mahsati and Ziggy.

== Work ==
Blount Moorhead has produced public art events, gallery exhibitions, film screenings, and education programs since 1991. Blount-Moorhead co-founded Red Clay, a Brooklyn-based nonprofit arts organization dedicated to providing a platform for emerging media and experimental artistic expression.

At Red Clay Arts, she curated and produced over 20 exhibitions and programs, in New York and London. These exhibitions include Random Occurrences (2005), a multi-venue exhibition in conjunction with Project Diversity; Cat Calls (2001), a Street Harassment project at St Ann's Warehouse and the NYC Museum; and an inaugural experimental series Practicum at Bric Arts Media BRIC(2002). With Red Clay Arts, Elissa Blount-Moorhead traveled to Jamaica, where she and her team taught children photography, photojournalism, new media and experimental artistic expression.

Blount Moorhead was the Director of Design, Programming, and Exhibitions at the Weeksville Heritage Center. She was co-curator of Funk, God, Jazz, and Medicine: Black Radical Brooklyn, a collaboration between with Creative Time and Weeksville Heritage Center. This was a walkable month-long art exhibition of four community-based art works by Xenobia Bailey, Simone Leigh, Otabenga Jones & Associates, and Bradford Young. She was the Director of RushKids an arts education program administered Rush Arts Gallery (2001-2003).

Blount Moorhead created and taught the Cultural Pluralism course for Pratt Institute's Graduate School of Art and Cultural Management (1999-2011), and at the Parsons Graduate School of Design at Cooper Hewitt since 2012. She lectures and publishes work internationally covering environmental design, history, and museology.

She co-founded the art and social practice team, Tandem and TNEG film studio. She began her partnership with cinematographers Arthur Jafa and Malik Sayeed in 2013, establishing the film studio TNEG. Their goal is to develop and produce new black independent films, but films that will also “push what we understand to be new black cinema and to create not just new narratives, but also new aesthetics and technical parameters within black cinema." She says, "I feel like independent film in general is becoming more well-regarded and more supported. If you just think back 20 years there was no IFC, or things like that. There are more alternative platforms now, like Netflix, that are now commissioning and financing work that will go directly through their channels—those are the ways you are able to provide an outlet for people and to hopefully allow filmmakers to create a voice that is not contingent on mainstream and Hollywood expectations."

Blount Moorhead wrote P is for Pussy in 2015, a "children's" alphabet picture book filled with double-entendres.

In February 2024, it was announced that she is the first Rubys-sponsored residency through a partnership with Art Omi in the Hudson Valley.

On September 24, 2026, the Baltimore Museum of Art announced that it would award Moorhead its Amy Sherald Artist Who Inspires Award "for her work igniting creativity and community in Baltimore."
