= Tombstone Blues =

Song by Bob Dylan

from the album Highway 61 Revisited
- Released: August 30, 1965
- Recorded: July 29, 1965
- Studio: Columbia A, 799 Seventh Avenue, New York
- Genre: Garage rock; blues; folk rock
- Length: 5:58
- Label: Columbia
- Songwriter: Bob Dylan
- Producer: Bob Johnston

Official audio
- "Tombstone Blues" on YouTube

"Tombstone Blues" is a song by American singer-songwriter Bob Dylan, which was released as the second track on his sixth studio album Highway 61 Revisited (1965). The song was written by Dylan, and produced by Bob Johnston. Critical interpretations of the song have suggested that the song references the Vietnam War and US President Lyndon Baines Johnson.

Twelve takes of "Tombstone Blues" were recorded on July 29, 1965. The last of these takes was released on Highway 61 Revisited the following month. The song received critical acclaim, with praise for the lyrics, music, and delivery. The album version, and out-takes, have been included on several later compilations. Dylan's official website lists 169 concert performances, from 1965 to 2006. Live versions have appeared on the albums Real Live (1984), MTV Unplugged (1995), and Shadow Kingdom (2023).

== Background and recording ==
Bob Dylan recorded "Like a Rolling Stone" in mid-June 1965, with Tom Wilson as producer. Wilson had produced Dylan's albums The Times They Are a-Changin' (1964), Another Side of Bob Dylan (1964), and Bringing It All Back Home (1965); the last of these had been Dylan's first album with electric instruments. Following clashes between Dylan and Wilson in 1965, Bob Johnston replaced Wilson as Dylan's producer. After recording "Like a Rolling Stone", Dylan wrote a number of songs, including "Tombstone Blues", at his newly-purchased house in Byrdcliffe.

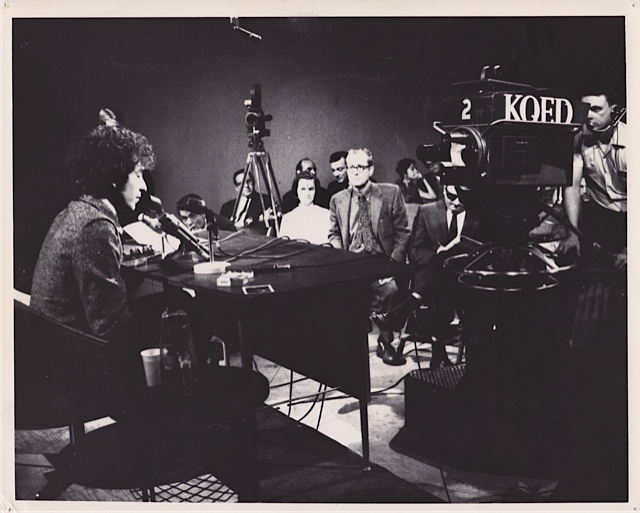
"Tombstone Blues" has been described as folk rock. At this press conference in December 1965, Bob Dylan (pictured left) denied playing folk-rock and said "I like to think of it more in terms of vision music – it's mathematical music."

Twelve takes were recorded on July 29, 1965, at Columbia Studio A, 799 Seventh Avenue, New York. Dylan sang and played guitar and harmonica, accompanied by Mike Bloomfield on guitar, Paul Griffin on piano, Al Kooper on organ, Joe Macho, Jr. on bass, and Bobby Gregg on drums. The last of these takes, lasting five minutes and 58 seconds, was included as the second track (following the opener "Like a Rolling Stone") on Dylan's sixth studio album, Highway 61 Revisited, which was released on August 30, 1965. It was later included on his compilation albums Biograph (1985), The Original Mono Recordings, and The Best of the Original Mono Recordings (2010). Alternate takes were included on The Bootleg Series Vol. 7: No Direction Home: The Soundtrack (2005) and The Bootleg Series Vol. 12: The Cutting Edge 1965–1966 (2015). Backing vocals by The Chambers Brothers were recorded on August 3, and a version including them was eventually released on the Bloomfield retrospective From His Head to His Heart to His Hands (2014).

In the sleeve notes to Biograph, Dylan commented how he had felt that he had "broken through with this song, that nothing like it had been done before". He added that he had been inspired by overheard bar-room conversations between police officers about the death of criminals.

The critic Andy Gill describes the structure of the song as "paired four-line stanzas to the rhyme-scheme a/a/a/b, c/c/c/b". The album take has six choruses, five of which have identical words while the other differs slightly. In the first take, all of the choruses are unique, with the characters "Mama" and "Daddy" in different combinations of situations. The Dylan biographer Robert Shelton details the basic chords in the verse as "C, C7, F, and back to C", with a middle eight in which "F and C chords alternate".

"Tombstone Blues" has been described as folk rock, a term Dylan detested. Gill characterizes the music as a "fast blues shuffle", while Stephen Thomas Erlewine of AllMusic considers it to be garage rock. The Dylan scholar Michael Gray regards Chuck Berry as an important influence on Dylan, and argues that "Dylan could never have written 'Tombstone Blues' without Chuck Berry". Gill also detects the influence of Berry on the song, as well as the Woody Guthrie and Pete Seeger song "Taking It Easy", which has a repetitive chorus about a mother in the kitchen that is emulated by Dylan's song.

== Lyrics and interpretation ==
The authors Philippe Margotin and Jean-Michel Guesdon assert that the title of the song refers to Tombstone, Arizona, but literature scholar Richard Brown is more equivocal, suggesting that the title could represent "a rather doomy or morbid joke, an existential melancholy produced by an awareness of the inescapable condition of human mortality". The song contains several direct and indirect allusions to historical characters and events. Paul Revere's horse, Belle Starr, Jack the Ripper, Galileo, Cecil B. DeMille, Ma Rainey, and Beethoven are all mentioned in the lyrics.

Dylan's biographer Robert Shelton writes that the song references the Vietnam War throughout, especially the title and the third and fourth verses. This interpretation is shared by other critics. In an early version, the song refers to a "blacksmith with freckles"; as the song develops in later takes, this becomes "John the blacksmith" and eventually "John the Baptist". The third verse includes:

John the Baptist after torturing a thief
Looks up at his hero the Commander-in-Chief
Saying, "Tell me great hero, but please make it brief
Is there a hole for me to get sick in?"

The fourth verse includes:

The king of the Philistines his soldiers to save
Put jawbones on their tombstones and flatters their graves
Puts the pied piper in prison and fattens the slaves
Then sends them out to the jungle.

Shelton sees President Lyndon Baines Johnson as the subject of the phrase "King of the Philistines". The political scholar Andrew Gamble remarked that this verse is "often been taken to be a direct reference to the escalating war in Vietnam".

David Boucher, an international relations scholar, describes the song as "not a narrative but instead a series of metaphors whose inspiration happens to be the Vietnam war". Political science scholar Jeff Taylor and historian Chad Israelson suggest that although "Tombstone Blues" is not overtly political, its theme is the mockery of authority. For the critic Mike Marqusee, the repetitive and routine lives of the narrator's parents in the choruses contrast with the "cruel antics of the rich and powerful" laid out in the verses.

The scholar of English Neil Corcoran reasons that as John the Baptist's commander-in-chief is Jesus Christ, the song is blasphemous; the same description was applied by Record Mirror reviewer Norman Jopling in his 1965 review.

== Critical comments ==
Shelton finds the song funny, commenting on the outlandish juxtapositions, and praises both the lyrics and the musical performances, particularly the guitar playing. John Nogowski also extols the humor, and gives the album version an A rating, suggesting that it could only have been written by Dylan. In 2012, Jim Beviglia included the song at 36th place in his ranking of Dylan's "finest" songs, commending the memorable phrases from the lyrics and the song's "glorious anarchy". Another critic to highlight Bloomfield's contribution on guitar was Joe Levy of Rolling Stone. Bill Janovitz of AllMusic, despite remarking that the musicians seem to be out of time with each other, gave a positive assessment, and argued that with songs like "Tombstone Blues", Dylan opened up new possibilities for other artists.

Stephen King, who has spoken of his admiration for Dylan's work, quotes from "Tombstone Blues" at the end of his first published novel Carrie.

== Live performances ==
Dylan's official website lists a total of 169 live performances of "Tombstone Blues", the most recent being in October 2006; after 1965 he did not perform the song live again until 1984. Although the website lists the first performance as being at Forest Hills Tennis Stadium on August 28, 1965, he actually debuted the song, in an acoustic version, at a Newport Folk Festival song workshop on July 24. The Forest Hills performance was heckled by a section of the crowd who resented his new musical direction. Performances later that year, at Carnegie Hall and the Mosque Theater, were more enthusiastically received by audiences, with the song being cheered as it started at the latter venue. A recording of the song from the Newcastle show of the Bob Dylan/Santana European Tour 1984, which featured Carlos Santana on guitar was included on Dylan's Real Live (1984). In Rolling Stone, Kurt Loder criticized the "formless arrangement" of the performance.

In 1994, Dylan recorded the song for his MTV Unplugged episode, and it was included on his MTV Unplugged album and video release of the show in 1995. The 2021 concert film Shadow Kingdom: The Early Songs of Bob Dylan includes a slower (and abridged) version of the song, which also appears on the related album Shadow Kingdom (2023). Rolling Stone reviewer Michaelangelo Matos wrote that the "mordant, mortality-steeped feeling doesn't bring the music down a bit".

== Personnel ==
Musical credits adapted from the details for take 1 on The Bootleg Series, Vol. 12: Bob Dylan 1965–1966, The Best of the Cutting Edge, and from Olof Björner's website. Technical credits adapted from the Bob Dylan All the Songs: The Story Behind Every Track book.

Musicians

- Bob Dylan – vocals, guitar, harmonica
- Mike Bloomfield – guitar
- Paul Griffin – piano
- Al Kooper – organ
- Joe Macho, Jr. – bass
- Bobby Gregg – drums

Technical personnel

- Bob Johnston – producer
- Frank Laico – sound engineering
- Pete Dauria – sound engineering
- Ted Brosnan – sound engineering
