= The Reflektor Tapes =

2015 film

- Film poster
- Directed by: Kahlil Joseph
- Starring: Arcade Fire, James Murphy
- Cinematography: Autumn Durald Arkapaw; Lol Crawley; Malik Hassan Sayeed
- Release date: 12 September 2015 (TIFF)
- Running time: 75 minutes
- Country: United Kingdom
- Language: English

The Reflektor Tapes is a 2015 British documentary film directed by Kahlil Joseph about the making of the album Reflektor by the Canadian band Arcade Fire. It was shown in the TIFF Docs section of the 2015 Toronto International Film Festival.

== Release ==
The film had its world premiere at the Toronto International Film Festival on 12 September 2015, in the TIFF Documentary section. The film will be released in the United States on 24 September 2015. To supplement the film, Arcade Fire also announced a deluxe edition of Reflektor, which was released on 25 September. It featured the original recordings along with five unreleased songs on a cassette-only format.
