= On the Ice =

- Film poster
- Directed by: Andrew Okpeaha MacLean
- Screenplay by: Andrew Okpeaha MacLean
- Produced by: Lynette Howell; Marco Londoner; Zhana Londoner; Cara Marcous
- Starring: Frank Qutuq Irelan; John Miller; Josiah Patkotak
- Cinematography: Lol Crawley
- Edited by: Nat Sanders
- Music by: iZLER
- Production companies: On the Ice Productions; Silverwood Films; Treehead Films
- Release date: January 21, 2011 (Sundance Film Festival)
- Running time: 96 minutes
- Country: United States
- Languages: English; Iñupiaq

On the Ice is a 2011 American drama film written and directed by Andrew Okpeaha MacLean. The film is set in (and was shot on location in) Utqiagvik, Alaska, MacLean's home town, and follows two Iñupiat teenagers who, while on a seal hunt, accidentally kill one of their friends in a fight. Afraid of the consequences, they lie about his death and must grapple with their grief and guilt while attempting to keep their secret. The film is based upon an earlier work of MacLean's, Sikumi, which he released as a short film in 2008. On the Ice had its world premiere on January 21, 2011, at the Sundance Film Festival.

== Synopsis ==
Three friends head out on the ice to hunt seal, but a fight breaks out, and one is killed. The two remaining friends, Qalli (Josiah Patkotak) and Aivaaq (Frank Qutuq Irelan), report the death as an accident out of fear and panic. As the Iñupiat community in isolated Utqiagvik, Alaska is close knit, this loss hits the town hard. Qalli struggles to deal with his own guilt and loss while weaving a wider web of lies to handle his father's suspicion and investigation of the day's events. Aivaaq is unable to handle his guilt. He turns to drug and alcohol abuse and lashes out at his friends. The movie focuses on the impact of guilt, secrets, and lies on the teens and their community.

== Cast ==
- Josiah Patkotak as Qalli
- Frank Qutuq Irelan as Aivaaq
- Teddy Kyle Smith as Egasak
- Adamina Kerr as Michelle
- Sierra Jade Sampson as Uvlu
- John Miller as James
- Rosabelle Kunnanna Rexford as Aaka
- Vernon Kanayurak as Roscoe
- Billyjens Hopson as Jens
- Jay Rapoza as Max
- Allison Warden as Sigvaun
- Denae Brower as Darlene
- Tara Sweeney as Dora
- Tasha Taaqpak Panigeo as Charlene
- Jerica Aamodt as Ellie

== Reception ==
On the review aggregator website Rotten Tomatoes, 67% of 15 critics' reviews are positive, with an average rating of 5.7/10. Metacritic, which uses a weighted average, assigned the film a score of 59 out of 100, based on 12 critics, indicating "mixed or average" reviews.

The film performed well at film festivals where it received multiple awards. A reviewer for The A.V. Club gave the movie a B+ rating, remarking "The performances, all from non-professional local actors, are noticeably uneven, but the film is as much a portrait of a place as it is a narrative, and cinematographer Lol Crawley shoots the white-on-white polar expanses like they’re vistas stretching to the ends of the earth—which in a way, they are." Roger Ebert of the Chicago Sun-Times praised the film for its suspense and found the local actors convincing, noting that "guilt almost paralyzes Qalli".

=== Awards ===
- Best First Feature at the Berlin International Film Festival (2011, won)
- Crystal Bear Award at the Berlin International Film Festival (2011, won)
- Haskell Wexler Award for Best Cinematography at the Woodstock Film Festival (2011, won)
- Jury Prize for Best Feature Film at the Woodstock Film Festival (2011, won)
- Best New American Film at the Seattle International Film Festival (2011, won)
- Best Director at the American Indian Film Festival (2011, won)
- Best Film at the Cine Las Americas International Film Festival (2011, honorable mention)
- Grand Jury Prize at the Sundance Film Festival (2011, nominated)
