= Closer (Ty album) =

Studio album by Ty
- Released: 16 October 2006
- Genre: Hip hop
- Length: 55:38
- Label: Big Dada
- Producer: Ty, Drew Horley

Ty chronology
Upwards (2003)	Closer (2006)	Special Kind of Fool (2010)

Singles from Closer
- 1. "Closer" Released: 2006

Professional ratings
Review scores
Source	Rating
AllMusic	4/5 stars
The Guardian	3/5 stars
MusicOMH	4/5 stars
The Skinny	4/5 stars

Closer is the third studio album by British hip hop musician Ty. It was released on Big Dada in 2006.

== Critical reception ==
John Bush of AllMusic said: "With his third album, Ty earned the right to be called consistently brilliant." Bram Gieben of The Skinny called it "a purist hip-hop album, with 12 killer basslines, some really poppy hooks, and some intelligent, inspiring lyrics."

== Track listing ==
No.	Title	Length
1.	"Don't Watch That (Knickers, Y-Fronts and Jockstraps)"	3:46
2.	"Everybody"	4:33
3.	"This Here Music" (featuring Speech of Arrested Development)	5:14
4.	"The Idea" (featuring De La Soul)	3:55
5.	"What You Want (Taylormade)" (featuring Taylor McFerrin, Jason the Angrynotes, and Joy Jones)	5:32
6.	"Closer" (featuring Maceo)	4:43
7.	"Oh!" (featuring Bahamadia and Zion I)	4:24
8.	"Aim for Your Goals" (featuring Eska)	5:01
9.	"Sweating for Your Salary" (featuring Wunmi Dele Sosimi)	5:10
10.	"Sophisticated and Coarse" (featuring Eska)	4:36
11.	"L.O.V.E. (No Matter What)" (featuring Vula)	4:04
12.	"Hustle (That's Why We)" (featuring Rich Medina)	4:49
