= The Defamation of Strickland Banks =

Studio album by Plan B
- Released: 9 April 2010
- Studios: The Sanctuary, Miloco (London, England)
- Genres: Soul, R&B, hip-hop, rap rock
- Length: 49:58
- Labels: 679, Asylum
- Producers: Ben Drew, SMV, Paul Epworth

Plan B chronology
Who Needs Actions When You Got Words (2006)	The Defamation of Strickland Banks (2010)	Ill Manors (2012)

Singles from The Defamation of Strickland Banks
- 1. "Stay Too Long" Released: 8 January 2010; 2. "She Said" Released: 24 February 2010; 3. "Prayin'" Released: 9 July 2010; 4. "The Recluse" Released: 4 October 2010; 5. "Love Goes Down" Released: 3 December 2010; 6. "Writing's on the Wall" Released: 7 March 2011; 7. "Hard Times" Released: 19 May 2011

The Defamation of Strickland Banks is the second studio album from English singer and rapper Plan B. It was released on 12 April 2010 by 679 Recordings. The album is a departure from the sound heard on Plan B's debut album Who Needs Actions When You Got Words, providing a showcase for the rapper's singing. A concept album, it narrates the fictitious tale of Strickland Banks, a sharp-suited British soul singer who finds fame with bitter-sweet love songs like the album's opener "Love Goes Down", only to have it slip through his fingers when sent to prison for a crime he did not commit.

The album received generally positive reviews from music critics. It produced the singles "Stay Too Long", "She Said", "Prayin'", "The Recluse", "Love Goes Down", "Writing's on the Wall" and "Hard Times". The album has sold 1.4 million copies in the UK as of May 2018.

== Background ==
Drew had always wanted to make his second album as a concept album and he had previously abandoned an attempt to make a hip-hop follow up to his debut Who Needs Actions When You Got Words. After learning more about the technical aspects of singing and having written some soul songs such as "Love Goes Down", which was written whilst supporting The Roots on tour in 2006, Plan B came up with the concept of a story about a soul singer who gets sent to prison. He commenced recording of the album in which half the songs were hip-hop tracks narrated by Plan B and the other half were soul songs told through the eyes of the fictional character Strickland Banks. However, this idea was scrapped because the two genres did not work well together and the label 679 Artists thought the idea was too confusing. Hence the album was split into two records and it was agreed that the soul record would be released as Plan B's second studio album. The sound of the album was influenced by Paul Epworth who produced the demo version of "Writing's on the Wall", although the majority of the album was recorded with producers David McEwan and Eric Appapoulay at The Sanctuary, London. Production took more than two years due to the simultaneous work on the hip-hop and soul albums.

== Concept ==
The album tells the story from the first-hand perspective of Strickland Banks, a fictional character played by Plan B.

The album's opening track, "Love Goes Down" is a love song sung by Banks about his girlfriend while "Writing's on the Wall" details the new difficulties in their relationship. "Stay Too Long" follows him and his entourage as they celebrate the success of his concert with a night out which culminates in him having a one-night stand with a woman. In "She Said", it is learned that this woman is obsessed with his music and believes herself to be in love with him. He rejects her so she alleges that he raped her and the subsequent trial results in his incarceration.

In "Welcome to Hell" he is sent to prison, and much of the rest of the album is about his experience inside. Throughout the course of the songs "Hard Times" and "The Recluse", Strickland gets more isolated and insecure throughout as he struggles to cope with prison life. This results in his abuse at the hands of other prisoners, resulting in him purchasing a shiv on the prison black market throughout the course of "Traded in My Cigarettes". In "Prayin'" he is confronted by another prisoner who attacks him. With the help of another inmate Strickland kills the attacker in self-defence, with the other inmate taking the blame, and is burdened with this guilt during "Darkest Place".

The next two tracks, "Free" and "I Know a Song" detail initially his anger, then his acceptance of his life inside prison. In the last track, "What You Gonna Do", Strickland is in court again as new evidence has been brought up on his case while he waits anxiously to hear the verdict. The album finishes with the listener not sure of whether he is sent back to prison or released, leaving it open to interpretation.

== Singles ==
"Stay Too Long" was released as the first single from the album on 8 January 2010. It entered the UK Singles Chart on 17 January 2010, where it reached a peak of No. 9. It also peaked at No. 3 on the UK R&B Chart, making it Drew's first Top 10 single.

"She Said" was released as the second single from the album, on 24 February 2010. It reached No. 3 on the UK Singles Chart on 4 April 2010 as well as peaking at No. 1 on the UK R&B Chart, making it Drew's biggest selling single to date.

"Prayin'" was released as the third single from the album, on 9 July 2010. It climbed up the chart. before peaking at No. 16 on the UK Singles Chart. It also peaked at No. 9 on the UK R&B Chart, and overall, is Drew's second biggest single.

"The Recluse" was released as the fourth single from the album on 4 October 2010. The single peaked at No. 35 on the UK Singles Chart, and at No. 19 on the UK R&B Chart, making it Drew's fourth consecutive Top 40 hit, and fifth overall.

"Love Goes Down" was released as the fifth single from the album on 3 December 2010. It was later added to the A-List BBC Radio 1 Playlist, and peaked at No. 62 on the UK Singles Chart. "She Said" / "Prayin" was released a digital download medley single on 20 February 2011 after Drew performed the medley at the 2011 BRIT Awards. It charted at No. 72 on the UK Singles Chart. The medley also includes an excerpt of The Ballad of Belmarsh.

"Writing's on the Wall" was released as the sixth single from the album on 7 March 2011. The single did not chart on the UK Singles Chart. Two versions of the music video were released; the first available in February 2010.

"Hard Times" was released as the album's seventh and final single on 19 May 2011. The single version features newly recorded vocals from Elton John and Paloma Faith and peaked at No. 147 on the UK Singles Chart, in aid of Drew's chosen charity.

== Film ==
The Defamation of Strickland Banks is intended to be made into a musical film directed by Plan B himself. It was originally conceived as a short film to be released alongside the album and the original trailer was uploaded online in late 2009. The film intends to incorporate all the music videos from The Defamation of Strickland Banks and The Ballad of Belmarsh with scenes of dialogue. Kelly Brook and Roger Daltrey have also been rumoured to have roles in the film. A second film trailer was uploaded to YouTube in February 2011.

== Critical reception ==
Professional ratings
Aggregate scores
Source	Rating
Metacritic	75/100
Review scores
Source	Rating
AllMusic	4/5 stars
BBC Music	(Highly positive)
Clash	7/10 stars
The Daily Telegraph	4/5 stars
The Guardian	3/5 stars
Mojo	4/5 stars
NME	6/10 stars
Q	4/5 stars
Spin	8/10 stars
The Times	4/5 stars

Upon its release, The Defamation of Strickland Banks received generally positive reviews from music critics. At Metacritic, which assigns a normalised rating out of 100 to reviews from mainstream critics, the album received an average score of 75, based on 16 reviews, which indicates "generally favorable reviews". The critics tended to compare this work with Plan B's previous album, Who Needs Actions When You Got Words, from four years earlier. The change from "spectacularly violent soliloquies" on his debut to crooning soul on his second effort caught some reviewers by surprise, though not all unhappily. Ian Wade of the BBC gave the album and Plan B great praise, calling it "tremendous work", admiring its range, as for example "on 'Welcome to Hell' he trills like a scared-to-pick-up-the-soap-in-the-prison-shower Smokey Robinson, while 'Hard Times' and 'Love Goes Down' are just lovely – anyone operating in the greasy world of pop would give a limb for such songs." For Pete Paphides of The Times, Defamation deserved 4 out of 5 stars.

The Guardian's Alexis Petridis gave it 3 out of 5 stars. Though dissatisfied with its concept and "gaping holes in the album's plot", he said, "Drew's reinvention suits him. The strength of his voice was understandably overlooked on his debut, but it comes into its own here: a high, aching croon that adds an appealing touch of self-doubt to the hardest-hitting lyrics. Rather than simply drafting in Mark Ronson to add a retro-soul veneer, he's clearly studied the source material: the result is a string of uniformly well-done Smokey Robinson pastiches. In a neat touch, the bleaker Strickland Banks's story becomes, the lovelier the melodies.". John Freeman, writing for Clash, gave it a 7/10 rating, while suggesting that the style change. NME's Sam Wolfson gave the album a rating of 6 out of 10, and expressed regret at Plan B's move into new territory. At The Daily Telegraph, Thomas H Green gave it 4 out of 5 stars, calling it "accessible, polished and brimming with verve". He closed his review saying, "The rapping hasn't been completely abandoned, either, but the emphasis here is on his sweet soul voice and a thumping Motown groove, an intriguing change of direction that's both passionate and populist."

== Commercial performance ==
On 18 April 2010, the album debuted on the UK Albums Chart at No. 1, selling 68,173 copies in its first week and a further 47,950 in its second week. It was the 5th biggest selling album of 2010 in the United Kingdom, with sales of 826,400. As of May 2018, the album has sold 1.4 million copies in the UK.

== Track listing ==
All tracks are written by Ben Drew.

No.	Title	Producer(s)	Length
1.	"Love Goes Down"	Ben Drew, David McEwan, Eric Appapoulay (add.)	3:52
2.	"Writing's on the Wall"	Paul Epworth	3:42
3.	"Stay Too Long"	Epworth	3:44
4.	"She Said"	Drew, McEwan, Appapoulay (add.)	3:31
5.	"Welcome to Hell"	Epworth	4:32
6.	"Hard Times"	Drew, McEwan, Appapoulay (add.)	3:57
7.	"The Recluse"	Drew, Appapoulay (add.)	3:19
8.	"Traded in My Cigarettes"	Drew, McEwan, Appapoulay (add.)	4:14
9.	"Prayin'"	Epworth	3:46
10.	"Darkest Place"	Drew, McEwan, Appapoulay (add.)	4:20
11.	"Free"	Drew, McEwan, Appapoulay (add.)	3:42
12.	"I Know a Song"	Drew, McEwan, Appapoulay (add.)	3:10
13.	"What You Gonna Do"	Drew	4:11
Total length:			49:58

Deluxe edition bonus disc
No.	Title	Producer(s)	Length
1.	"Verses"	Drew	4:01
2.	"Spend My Money"	Drew	4:09
3.	"Prayin'" (demo)	Drew, McEwan (add.), Appapoulay (add.)	3:53
4.	"She Said" (live from Café de Paris)	Drew	3:42
5.	"Welcome to Hell" (live from Café de Paris)	Drew	4:45
6.	"Stay Too Long" (Pendulum remix)	Epworth	7:06
7.	"She Said" (Shy FX remix)	Drew, McEwan, Appapoulay (add.)	4:23

Note

- The deluxe edition sold at HMV does not contain the Shy FX remix of "She Said".

== Personnel ==
- Ben Drew – vocals, producer, mixing

Production

- David McEwan – producer, engineer, mixing
- Paul Epworth – producer, mixing
- Eric Appapoulay – additional producer, mixing
- Mark "Top" Rankin – engineer, mixing
- Will Kennard – additional mixing
- Harry Escott – string arrangements
- Sally Herbert – string arrangements
- Jason Yarde – brass arrangements
- Guy Davie – mastering

Additional musicians

- Aleysha Gordon – backing vocals
- Hannah Kemoh – backing vocals
- Samantha Smith – backing vocals
- Jennifer Dawodu – backing vocals
- Marvin Cottrell – backing vocals
- Tom Wright-Goss – guitar
- Eric Appapoulay – bass, backing vocals
- Jodi Milliner – bass
- Darren Playford – drums. co-writer
- Cassell The BeatMaker – drums. co-writer
- Paul Epworth – drums
- Everton Newson – violin
- Louisa Fuller – violin
- Sally Herbert – violin
- Warren Zielinski – violin
- Bruce White – viola
- Sonia Slany – viola
- Ian Burdge – cello
- Harry Escott – additional cello
- Jason Yarde – alto saxophone, baritone saxophone
- Zem Audu – tenor saxophone
- Harry Brown – trombone
- David Prisemen – trumpet, flugelhorn
- Mark Crown – trumpet

Managerial and design

- Fabrice Spelta – art direction
- Mike Hosey – art direction
- Ben Parks – photography
- Roy Eldridge – management
- Sam Eldridge – management

== Charts and certifications ==
=== Weekly charts ===
Chart (2010–2013)	Peak position
Australian Albums (ARIA)	25
Austrian Albums (Ö3 Austria)	11
Belgian Albums (Ultratop Flanders)	89
Belgian Albums (Ultratop Wallonia)	94
Danish Albums (Hitlisten)	18
European Top 100 Albums	8
French Albums (SNEP)	23
German Albums (Offizielle Top 100)	7
Greek Albums (IFPI)	12
Irish Albums (IRMA)	7
Scottish Albums (Official Charts)	1
South Korean Albums (Gaon)	84
Swiss Albums (Schweizer Hitparade)	41
UK Albums (Official Charts)	1
US Heatseekers Albums (Billboard)	19

Chart (2020)	Peak position
Scottish Albums (OCC)	49
UK Albums (OCC)	96

=== Year-end charts ===
Chart (2010)	Position
European Top 100 Albums	23
French Albums (SNEP)	133
UK Albums (OCC)	5

=== Decade-end charts ===
Chart (2010–2019)	Position
UK Albums (OCC)	20

=== Certifications ===
Region	Certification	Certified units/sales
United Kingdom (BPI)	4× Platinum	1,399,393
Summaries
Europe (IFPI)	2× Platinum	2,000,000^{*}
^{*} Sales figures based on certification alone.

== Release history ==
Region	Date	Catalog	Format	Label
United Kingdom	9 April 2010	CD	5051865847120	679/Atlantic
United Kingdom	9 April 2010	2xVinyl	5051865899303	679/Atlantic
United Kingdom	9 April 2010	2xCD	5051865899327	679/Atlantic
Australia	12 April 2010	CD	5186584712	679/Atlantic
United States	19 April 2011	CD	CK 52757-6	679/Atlantic

== Cancelled sequel ==
In 2011, the year after the release of The Defamation Of Strickland Banks, Plan B announced a follow-up album, The Ballad of Belmarsh. He told the Daily Mirror that the album would be closer in tone to his debut, Who Needs Actions When You Got Words: "It's an underground hip-hop album about Strickland Banks being banged up in Belmarsh. I won't be him singing anymore, I'll be rapping about him, commenting on the story." In September 2011, Plan B announced that The Ballad of Belmarsh had been put on hold in order to work on his then-upcoming film Ill Manors (2012).

In April 2018, Plan B stated that the project never came to fruition because he got bored of the Strickland Banks character:

"It's one of those lost albums. I'd shot Ill Manors and the label wasn't taking the film seriously. I'd written most of it before I put out ...Strickland Banks. I was living at RAK Studios and done the whole American thing where I've got different people working in different rooms. It was bollocks. It felt like I was only doing it to capitalise on the success of Strickland Banks and at that point I was sick of Strickland Banks. Fuck him.

"You know them fuckers who get stuck in sitcoms, like the geezer from Steptoe & Son? Apparently he was a sick up 'n' coming actor and he done Steptoe & Son and it blew up and he got typecast. I started to experience what that felt like by doing The Ballad of Belmarsh after Strickland Banks. By that point, I hated the sight of Strickland Banks. I'm sure a lot of other people did too. I was plastered everywhere. That would've got on my nerves. It did get on my nerves!"

"I can understand why it gets on other people's nerves, when someone gets so big you're just bombarded with their face all over the place. I was sick of the sight of my own face. That's why I did Ill Manors instead of The Ballad of Belmarsh."

== See also ==
- The Defamation of Strickland Banks Tour
