= She Said (Plan B song) =

2010 single by Plan B

Single by Plan B

from the album The Defamation of Strickland Banks
- Released: 24 February 2010
- Studio: The Sanctuary, London
- Length: 3:31
- Label: 679; Atlantic
- Songwriter: Ben Drew
- Producers: Ben Drew; David McEwan; Eric Appapoulay (add.)

Plan B singles chronology
"Stay Too Long" (2010)	"She Said" (2010)	"Prayin'" (2010)

"She Said" is the second single from the British musician Plan B's second album The Defamation of Strickland Banks—a concept album whose songs tell the fictitious tale of a British soul singer who ends up in prison. The single was released as a digital download and on CD single on 24 February 2010. "She Said" was the sixteenth best-selling British single of 2010.

== Background ==
"She Said" began to receive increasing amounts of radio airplay throughout February and March 2010. BBC Radio 1 and Radio Gibraltar in particular were supportive of the track up until its release. Plan B performed the single on 12 March 2010 edition of Friday Night with Jonathan Ross. He also performed on Conan on 19 April 2011. The song was also featured in the start of the pilot episode of Whitney.

== Music video ==
The music video for "She Said" was directed by Daniel Wolfe and shows the soul singer Strickland Banks, played by Plan B, in court following the events of the "Stay Too Long" video. The video also stars actress Vicky McClure as Strickland Banks' girlfriend and Kaya Scodelario as the female lead.

== Chart performance ==
On 4 April 2010, the single debuted on the UK Singles Chart at a current peak of number three, making "She Said", Plan B's most successful single to date. The single remained at number three for two consecutive weeks before falling to number four on 18 April 2010, where it remained for two weeks. The single then climbed back to the peak of number three on 2 May 2010, where it remained for yet another two weeks. On 16 May 2010, the single fell three places to number six before falling a further two places to number eight on its eighth week in the top 10.

The single also debuted on the Irish Singles Chart on 1 April 2010 at number 35, where it remained for two consecutive weeks. On 15 April 2010, the single climbed 15 places to number 20, before climbing a further eight places to number 12 the following week. The single remained at number 12 for three consecutive weeks before climbing three places to number nine on 13 May 2010, marking Plan B's first top 10 hit in Ireland. On its second week in the top 10, the single climbed seven places to a current peak of number two.

In January 2011, the single made a return to the UK top 100, reaching number 63 in the first week of the new year.

== Track listing ==
- UK CD single
1. "She Said" – 3:31
2. "She Said" (16bit remix) – 4:36
3. "She Said" (Shy FX remix) – 4:22
4. "She Said" (Shy FX dub) – 4:22
- UK 7" vinyl
1. "She Said" – 3:31
2. "She Said" (16bit remix) – 4:36
- Digital download
1. "She Said" – 3:28
- Digital download – single
1. "She Said" (live Café de Paris) – 3:41
2. "She Said" (16 Bit remix) – 4:33
- Digital download – EP
1. "She Said" – 3:28
2. "She Said" (live Café de Paris) – 3:41
3. "She Said" (Shy FX remix) – 4:19
4. "She Said" (Shy FX dub) – 4:19
5. "She Said" (16 Bit remix) – 4:33

== Personnel ==
- Plan B – vocals, producer, mixing

Production

- David McEwan – producer, mixing
- Eric Appapoulay – additional producer, mixing
- Sally Herbert – string arrangements/>
- Jason Yarde – brass arrangements
- Mark "Top" Rankin – engineer
- Guy Davie – mastering

Additional musicians

- Tom Wright-Goss – guitar
- Eric Appapoulay – bass, backing vocals
- Richard Cassell – drums
- Everton Newson – violin
- Louisa Fuller – violin
- Sally Herbert – violin
- Warren Zielinski – violin
- Bruce White – viola
- Sonia Slany – viola
- Ian Burdge – cello
- Jason Yarde – alto saxophone, baritone saxophone
- Zem Audu – tenor saxophone
- Harry Brown – trombone
- David Prisemen – trumpet, flugelhorn
- Mark Crown – trumpet

== Charts and certifications ==
=== Weekly charts ===
Chart (2010)	Peak position
Austria (Ö3 Austria Top 40)	9
Belgium (Ultratop 50 Flanders)	33
Belgium (Ultratop 50 Wallonia)	18
Denmark (Tracklisten)	20
Europe (European Hot 100 Singles)	13
France Download (SNEP)	13
Germany (GfK)	10
Hungary (Rádiós Top 40)	23
Ireland (IRMA)	2
Scottish Singles Sales (Official Charts)	3
Switzerland (Schweizer Hitparade)	16
UK Singles (Official Charts)	3
UK Hip Hop/R&B (Official Charts)	1

Chart (2011)	Peak position
Australia (ARIA)	70
France (SNEP)	51
UK Singles (Official Charts)	42
UK Hip Hop/R&B (Official Charts)	14

=== Year-end charts ===
Chart (2010)	Position
Austria (Ö3 Austria Top 40)	59
Europe (European Hot 100 Singles)	48
Germany (Official German Charts)	43
Italy (FIMI)	88
Italy Airplay (EarOne)	32
Switzerland (Schweizer Hitparade)	65
UK Singles (OCC)	16

Chart (2011)	Position
UK Singles (OCC)	197

=== Certifications ===
Region	Certification	Certified units/sales
Germany (BVMI)	Gold	150,000^{^}
Italy (FIMI)	Gold	15,000^{*}
United Kingdom (BPI)	2× Platinum	1,200,000^{‡}
^{*} Sales figures based on certification alone.^{^} Shipments figures based on certification alone.^{‡} Sales+streaming figures based on certification alone.

== Release history ==
Region	Date	Format	Label
United Kingdom	24 February 2010	Digital download; CD single	679; Atlantic

== See also ==
- List of number-one R&B hits of 2010 (UK)
