= Special Kind of Fool =

Studio album by Ty
- Released: 19 April 2010
- Genre: Hip hop
- Length: 69:12
- Label: BBE
- Producer: Ty, Drew Horley

Ty chronology
Closer (2006)	Special Kind of Fool (2010)	A Work of Heart (2018)

Professional ratings
Review scores
Source	Rating
AllMusic	7/10 stars
BBC	mixed
Exclaim!	unfavorable

Special Kind of Fool is the fourth studio album by British hip hop musician Ty. It was released on BBE in 2010.

== Critical reception ==
Martin Longley of BBC described the album as "a curious mixture of uncompromising rap and populist soulfulness, often playing side-by-side." Aaron Matthews of Exclaim! said: "This rap record needs more rapping."

== Track listing ==
No.	Title	Length
1.	"Don't Cry" (featuring Corey Mwamba)	4:28
2.	"Wait" (featuring Leo Ihenacho and Soweto Kinch)	4:15
3.	"Heart Is Breaking" (featuring Sway and Roses Gabor)	5:40
4.	"Little Star" (featuring Wreh-Asha)	4:08
5.	"Something Big" (featuring Carroll Thompson)	4:37
6.	"Emotions" (featuring Sarina Leah and Shaun Escoffery)	4:18
7.	"Phantom of the Opera" (featuring Anthony Mills)	4:48
8.	"Get to the Sky" (featuring Vula Malinga and Terri Walker)	5:53
9.	"Happiness" (featuring Vula Malinga)	5:30
10.	"I'm Leaving" (featuring Anthony Mills)	5:06
11.	"ME" (featuring Erik Rico)	4:51
12.	"I Get Up" (featuring D-Cross)	4:49
13.	"Falling" (featuring Shaun Escoffery and Finn Peters)	5:12
14.	"Special Kind of Fool" (featuring Erik Rico)	3:58
15.	"Endtro" (featuring Leo Ihenacho and Robin Mullarkey)	1:50
