= Stay Too Long =

Single by Plan B

from the album The Defamation of Strickland Banks
- B-side: "Spend My Money"
- Released: 8 January 2010
- Recorded: 2009
- Studio: Miloco Studios, London
- Genre: Power pop; glam rock; rap rock
- Length: 3:44
- Label: 679/Atlantic
- Songwriter: Ben Drew
- Producer: Paul Epworth

Plan B singles chronology
"End Credits" (2009)	"Stay Too Long" (2010)	"She Said" (2010)

"Stay Too Long" is the first single from British musician Plan B's second album The Defamation of Strickland Banks. The single was released on 8 January 2010. Drum and bass group Pendulum also produced a remix, their first in three years, which was used as runway-soundtrack for the 2010 Victoria's Secret Fashion Show. The Pendulum remix was also used on the video game Need For Speed: Hot Pursuit, and a short version is used on the video game The Sims 3: Pets trailer. The song was also used in part of episode two of the sixth series of Doctor Who Confidential. The song was also used in The Inbetweeners Movie. BBC also use this as their theme for tennis.

== Music video ==
The music video for "Stay Too Long" was directed by Daniel Wolfe and shows the soul singer Strickland Banks on the night after one of his concerts. It was first aired online and on music channels in December 2009. British actress Kaya Scodelario plays the lead female role in the video. The video also includes the British actor Elliott Tittensor who is involved in a fight scene with Plan B.

== Performances ==
Plan B performed the remix of the song alongside Pendulum at the 2011 MTV Europe Music Awards at Belfast City Hall during the backstage show.

== Chart performance ==
On 17 January 2010, "Stay Too Long" entered the UK Singles Chart at number 9, which currently marks Plan B's second most successful single. The following week, the single fell to number 18, meaning it only spent one week within the top 10. On its third week in the chart, the single fell to number 19 and then to number 23 on its fourth week. On 14 February 2010, the single fell 9 places to number 32, before falling out of the Top 40 to number 45 the following week. Following the release of the album, The Defamation of Strickland Banks, the single rocketed back into the Top 40 on 26 April 2010 to number 37 for one week, bringing the total of weeks spent in the Top 40 to six. The single also managed to debut at number 2 on the UK R&B Chart, being beaten only by Iyaz's "Replay". The song has sold over 190,000 sales in the UK.

== Track listing ==
- UK CD single
1. "Stay Too Long" - 3:44
2. "Stay Too Long" (Pendulum Remix) - 7:06
- UK Promotional CD single
1. "Stay Too Long" (Radio Edit) - 3:22
2. "Stay Too Long" - 3:44
- UK Promotional DVD single
1. "Stay Too Long" (Music Video) - 3:45
- 12" vinyl
1. "Stay Too Long" - 3:44
2. "Spend My Money" - 4:06
- Digital download
1. "Stay Too Long" - 3:44
- Digital download - Remix
1. "Stay Too Long" (Pendulum Remix) - 7:06
- Digital single
1. "Stay Too Long" - 3:44
2. "Spend My Money" - 4:06

== Personnel ==
- Plan B – vocals

Production

- Paul Epworth – producer
- Mark "Top" Rankin – engineer, mixing

Additional musicians

- Tom Wright-Goss – guitar
- Eric Appapoulay – bass
- Richard Cassell – drums
- Aleysha Gordon – backing vocals
- Hannah Kemoh – backing vocals
- Jennifer Dawodu – backing vocals
- Marvin Cottrell – backing vocals

== Charts ==
Chart (2010)	Peak position
UK Singles (OCC)	9
UK Hip Hop/R&B (OCC)	2

=== Year-end charts ===
Chart (2010)	Position
UK Singles (Official Charts Company)	106

== Certifications ==
Region	Certification	Certified units/sales
United Kingdom (BPI)	Gold	400,000^{‡}
^{‡} Sales+streaming figures based on certification alone.

== Release history ==
Region	Date	Format	Label
United Kingdom	8 January 2010	Digital download, CD single	679 Recordings
