= Upwards (album) =

Studio album by Ty
- Released: 29 September 2003
- Genre: Hip hop
- Length: 58:16
- Label: Big Dada
- Producer: Ty, Drew Horley

Ty chronology
Awkward (2001)	Upwards (2003)	Closer (2006)

Singles from Upwards
- 1. "Groovement / Ha Ha" Released: 2003; 2. "Wait a Minute" Released: 2003; 3. "Look 4 Me" Released: 2004; 4. "Oh U Want More?" Released: 2004

Professional ratings
Review scores
Source	Rating
AllMusic	4/5 stars
BBC	favorable
Entertainment Weekly	B+
The Guardian	3/5 stars
PopMatters	unfavorable
Spin	favorable

Upwards is the second studio album by British hip hop musician Ty. It was released on Big Dada in 2003. It peaked at number 35 on the UK Independent Albums Chart. The album was nominated for the 2004 Mercury Prize.

== Critical reception ==
Jon Dolan of Spin said, "Ty is most reminiscent of robo-voiced Brit MCs like Roots Manuva, and his turtleneck-rocking look suggests a dude too arty to party, but his mix of neo-soul warmth, skip-rope beats, and clever rhymes smoothes out his raggafied rough edges."

== Track listing ==
No.	Title	Length
1.	"Ha Ha"	4:10
2.	"Mpho's Lament (Skit)"	0:18
3.	"Wait a Minute"	3:22
4.	"I Want 2"	4:45
5.	"Awkward Boy (Skit)"	0:24
6.	"Oh U Want More?"	3:59
7.	"Rain"	6:24
8.	"The Willing"	5:12
9.	"Look 4 Me"	4:15
10.	"Groovement Part 1"	3:49
11.	"Dreams"	4:49
12.	"Hot Spice"	3:25
13.	"Music 2 Fly 2 (with hidden track titled Inner Love)"	13:10

Reissue edition bonus tracks
No.	Title	Length
14.	"So U Want More? (Refix)" (featuring Roots Manuva)	4:59
15.	"Wait a Minute (Dwele Remix)"	3:11
16.	"So U Want More? (Revox)" (featuring Roots Manuva)	4:00
17.	"Groovement Parts 1 & 2"	8:53

== Charts ==
Chart	Peak position
UK Independent Albums (OCC)	35
