= To Be Alone with You =

Song by Bob Dylan

from the album Nashville Skyline
- Released: April 9, 1969
- Recorded: February 13, 1969
- Studio: Columbia Studio A (Nashville, Tennessee)
- Genre: Country rock
- Length: 2:07
- Label: Columbia
- Songwriter: Bob Dylan
- Producer: Bob Johnston

"To Be Alone with You" is a country-rock song by American singer-songwriter Bob Dylan, released as the third track on his 1969 album Nashville Skyline.

== Composition and recording ==
"To Be Alone with You" was the first song Dylan recorded for Nashville Skyline, on February 13, 1969. It was one of four songs Dylan had written for the album before the recording sessions, the others being "Lay Lady Lay", "I Threw It All Away" and "One More Night". It was recorded in eight takes, during which Dylan increased the backing instrumentation to include multiple guitars in addition to a dobro, a piano and an organ.

Before the song starts, Dylan is heard asking his producer, Bob Johnston, "Is it rolling, Bob?" It is a simple love song, with lyrics that Allmusic's Thomas Ward compares to a nursery rhyme. Andy Gill suggests that Dylan was influenced by Jerry Lee Lewis on this song. Gill suggests that both the arrangement and Dylan's delivery imitate Lewis' style and that the final verse, which combines carnal and religious lyrics, is also in the style of Lewis' songs. Years after recording it, Dylan commented that "I was trying to grasp something that would lead me on to where I thought I should be, and it didn't go anywhere".

The bridge of the song begins with the line "They say that nighttime is the right time". Music critic Michael Gray notes that "Night Time Is the Right Time" is a blues lyric that may have been based on a much older song and that it is surprising to find such a lyric in one of Nashville Skyline's country songs.

== Reception and legacy ==
Thomas Ward at AllMusic called it "(p)erhaps the sweetest song on Nashville Skyline", featuring "one of Dylan's prettiest melodies...a gorgeous, traditional country bridge (shifting to the V of the chord, then adding the II inversion) and a genuinely affecting, modest vocal".

Field Music's David Brewis cited it as his favorite Dylan song in a 2021 Stereogum article, calling it "slinky" and "sexy" and noting, "The band are crisp and soulful and the vocal lines are punctuated by understated stinging guitar. Maybe when it was released people were disappointed to hear Dylan making an album of country-soul toe-tappers and singing it in this oddly-entrancing muted honk, but he followed his whims and, come on, it’s Bob Dylan — he can (and should) do whatever the hell he wants".

== Live performances ==
Dylan first played "To Be Alone with You" live in concert more than 20 years after it was written, on October 15, 1989 at the Tower Theater outside Philadelphia on the Never Ending Tour. Since then, it has been played occasionally on the Never Ending Tour. In 1991 and 1992 it was frequently used to open the set. In the early 2000s it again became a frequent show opener, this time in a stirring rock and roll arrangement. According to his official website, Dylan has played the song live over 125 times through its most recent outing on the Rough and Rowdy Ways World Wide Tour in 2023.

Dylan resurrected the song, and substantially rewrote the lyrics, for his 2021 concert film Shadow Kingdom: The Early Songs of Bob Dylan. This new version is substantially longer than the original.

== Notable covers ==
It has been subsequently recorded by Catherine Howe for her 1975 album Harry, by Marshall Chapman for her 1982 album Take It on Home, by Steve Gibbons for his 1992 album On the Loose and by Sue Foley on her 1995 album Big City Blues.

The spoken line that opens the song provided the title of the 2004 compilation album Is it Rolling Bob?: A Reggae Tribute to Bob Dylan, where the 'rolling' is a reference to a joint.
