= Main Squeeze =

Studio album by Chuck Mangione
- Released: 1976
- Recorded: Electric Lady, New York City; Mediasound, New York City; Rosebud, New York City
- Genre: Crossover jazz; easy listening; jazz
- Length: 37:34
- Label: A&M
- Producer: Chuck Mangione

Chuck Mangione chronology
Encore (1975)	Main Squeeze (1976)	Feels So Good (1977)

Professional ratings
Review scores
Source	Rating
AllMusic	3/5 stars
DownBeat	2/5 stars

Main Squeeze is the fifth, all instrumental studio album by jazz flugelhorn player Chuck Mangione. The album was only briefly released on Compact Disc in the late 80's but discontinued not long after, making it for many years a rare find. However, it was finally reissued in 2018 as part of a budget five original albums set. It features one of Chuck Mangione's most popular songs, "Main Squeeze" and a supporting cast of several of NYC's finest sessions musicians of the day.

== Reception ==
A contemporary review in the jazz publication DownBeat began "When I say this album is a sleeper, I mean only that it is a godsend to insomniacs", awarding the album two stars.

== Track listing ==
All songs written by Chuck Mangione except where noted:

No.	Title	Writer(s)	Length
1.	"(The Day After) Our First Night Together"		8:01
2.	"If You Know Me Any Longer Than Tomorrow"		7:55
3.	"Love the Feelin'"		4:44
4.	"I Get Crazy (When Your Eyes Touch Mine)"		4:24
5.	"Doin' Everything With You"		7:05
6.	"Main Squeeze"	Chuck Mangione, Bob Mann, Don Grolnick, John Tropea, Ralph MacDonald, Richard Tee, Rubens Bassini, Tony Levin	5:25
Total length:			37:34

== Musicians ==
- Chuck Mangione - Flugelhorn, Fender Rhodes
- Tony Levin - Bass
- Rubens Bassini - Percussion
- Steve Gadd - Drums, Percussion
- Ralph MacDonald - Percussion
- Don Grolnick - Acoustic Piano, Fender Rhodes
- Richard Tee - Organ
- John Tropea - Electric & Acoustic Guitars
- Bob Mann - Electric & Acoustic Guitars
- Gene Orloff - Concertmaster
- Bob Carlisle, Fred Griffen, Jimmy Buffington, John Clarke - French Horns
- Bill Watrous, David Taylor, Tom Malone, Wayne Andre - Trombones
- Alan Rubin, Jeff Tkazyik, Jon Faddis, Lew Soloff - Trumpets

== Personnel ==
- Ian Patrick - Photography
- Roland Young - Art Direction
- Tom Iannaccone - Management
- Junie Osaki - Design
