= Shadow Kingdom: The Early Songs of Bob Dylan =

2021 American film by Alma Har'el

- Directed by: Alma Har'el
- Produced by: Alma Har'el; Christopher Leggett; Raphael Marmor
- Starring: Bob Dylan
- Cinematography: Lol Crawley
- Edited by: Alma Har'el
- Music by: Bob Dylan
- Distributed by: Apple TV+
- Release date: July 18, 2021 (Streaming Premiere)
- Running time: 50 minutes
- Country: United States
- Language: English

Shadow Kingdom is a 2021 film featuring American singer-songwriter Bob Dylan. Directed by Israeli-American filmmaker Alma Har'el, it was shot on a soundstage in Santa Monica, California, over seven days in 2021 while Dylan was sidelined from his Never Ending Tour due to the COVID-19 pandemic. The film features Dylan and a group of masked musicians performing 13 songs from the first half of Dylan's career in an intimate club-like setting.

Shadow Kingdom premiered via the livestream platform Veeps.com with little information about its contents having been revealed in pre-release publicity. Some viewers expected the event to be a live concert and were surprised when it turned out to be a stylized black-and-white art film featuring "pre-recorded set pieces" instead. Shadow Kingdom nonetheless earned rave reviews from critics, many of whom praised Dylan's creative re-arrangements of his early songs as well as Har'el's imaginative staging of the performances.

A soundtrack album, Shadow Kingdom, was released on June 2, 2023, and the full-length film was released four days later as a rental and digital download.

== Synopsis ==
Shadow Kingdom showcases Bob Dylan filmed in an intimate studio setting performing early songs from his extensive body of work. It was his first performance since the release of his album Rough and Rowdy Ways. In addition to Dylan (who sings and plays guitar and harmonica), most of the song arrangements consist of two additional guitars, a bass and an accordion. The performance of "Forever Young" also features a dolceola.

== Film cast ==
- Bob Dylan – vocals, guitar, harmonica
- Alexander Burke, accordion (Finger syncing)
- Buck Meek, guitar (Finger syncing)
- Shahzad Ismaily, guitar (Finger syncing)
- Janie Cowan, upright bass (Finger syncing)
- Joshua Crumbly, guitar (Finger syncing)

== Recording personnel ==
- Bob Dylan - vocals, guitar, harmonica
- Jeff Taylor - accordion
- Greg Leisz - guitar, pedal steel guitar, mandolin
- Tim Pierce - guitar
- T-Bone Burnett - guitar
- Ira Ingber - guitar
- Don Was - upright bass
- John Avila - electric bass
- Doug Lacy - accordion
- Steve Bartek - additional acoustic guitar

== Setlist ==
All tracks are written by Bob Dylan.

No.	Title	Length
1.	"When I Paint My Masterpiece"	4:28
2.	"Most Likely You Go Your Way and I'll Go Mine"	3:10
3.	"Queen Jane Approximately"	5:16
4.	"I'll Be Your Baby Tonight"	2:58
5.	"Just Like Tom Thumb's Blues"	4:11
6.	"Tombstone Blues"	4:54
7.	"To Be Alone with You"	3:10
8.	"What Was It You Wanted"	4:53
9.	"Forever Young"	3:18
10.	"Pledging My Time"	3:27
11.	"The Wicked Messenger"	2:47
12.	"Watching the River Flow"	3:15
13.	"It's All Over Now Baby Blue"	2:35
14.	"Sierra's Theme"	2:37

== Reception ==
Sam Sodomsky, writing at Pitchfork, called Shadow Kingdom a "gorgeous...concert film" in which "the 80-year-old icon sings clearly, melodically, beautifully", and noted that "Dylan seems at times to want to burst through the screen, gesturing passionately". Sodomsky also discussed director Alma Har'el's "knack for visualizing the haunted barroom production that Dylan has favored on his modern studio albums: As he sings in dusky rooms filled with cigarette smoke and lamplight, mannequins and Western characters, the whole thing takes on a surreal, ghostlike quality".

Variety's Chris Willman wrote that those who purchased advanced tickets to the Veeps livestream "did not really know much about what they were signing up for" but that "[w]hat they got, most would agree, was better — if shorter — than they imagined". Willman also praised Dylan's vocal performances ("he hasn’t sounded better in decades") and compared the "surreality" of the film's fictional setting (the non-existent "Bon Bon Club" in Marseille, France) to locations in David Lynch's Twin Peaks.

Uncut's Damien Love also invoked the work of Lynch, describing Shadow Kingdom as "deeply-felt surrealist-noir-Americana", as well as the paintings in Dylan's own "Beaten Path" series ("a handmade place of lost highways and forgotten barrooms and city lights in smeary rain; of lonely drive-in movie lots and funky diners and juke joints that all seem to float in some unfixed time that could be anywhere from the early-1930s to early tomorrow morning") and the Depression-era boarding-house setting of Conor McPherson's musical play Girl from the North Country.

Kitty Empire gave it a 5-out-of-5 star review in The Guardian, calling it "completely thrilling" and identifying the high point as Dylan's "poignant drawl on a sensational 'What Was It You Wanted', a series of accusatory questions that stress how slippery knowledge is". Empire also compared the Bon Bon club's atmosphere to "the vibe of the sleeve art of last year’s Rough and Rowdy Ways".

== See also ==
- List of songs written by Bob Dylan
- List of artists who have covered Bob Dylan songs
- List of Bob Dylan songs based on earlier tunes
