= Awkward (album) =

Studio album by Ty
- Released: 1 January 2001
- Genre: Hip hop
- Length: 56:53
- Label: Big Dada
- Producer: Ty, Unsung Heroes, Wylee Kyat, Soliheen, Drew, DJ Biznizz

Ty chronology
Awkward (2001)	Upwards (2003)

Singles from Awkward
- 1. "Break the Lock" Released: 2000; 2. "The Nonsense" Released: 2001

Professional ratings
Review scores
Source	Rating
AllMusic	4/5 stars
Billboard	favorable
CMJ New Music Monthly	favorable
Exclaim!	unfavorable

Awkward is the first studio album by British hip hop musician Ty. It was released on Big Dada in 2001. It peaked at number 40 on the UK Independent Albums Chart.

== Critical reception ==
Kieran Wyatt of CMJ New Music Monthly said: "The album title says it all really: Ty openly displays his uncomfortable relationship with himself, his music and the people around him and in doing so, comes through with an album that is bursting with honesty."

== Track listing ==
No.	Title	Length
1.	"Rev. Cloud Speaks"	1:15
2.	"Mind Made Up"	4:24
3.	"Walk with Your Ego"	3:30
4.	"Trippin' Over Words"	4:34
5.	"The Tale"	3:36
6.	"The Nonsense"	3:57
7.	"She's Not Feeling Me at the Moment"	1:42
8.	"Jealousy"	4:01
9.	"Hercules"	3:14
10.	"Zaibo"	4:45
11.	"You're So..."	4:31
12.	"Move"	3:32
13.	"Front Free"	4:12
14.	"Break the Lock"	3:44
15.	"Shake Your Tings (Skit)"	2:09
16.	"Ghetto Perspective"	3:47

== Charts ==
Chart	Peak position
UK Independent Albums (OCC)	40
