= Ty (rapper) =

Nigerian-British rapper (1972–2020)

- Also known as: T.Y. Ben Chijioke
- Born: Benedict Okwuchukwu Godwin Chijioke; 17 August 1972; London, England
- Origin: Brixton, London, England
- Died: 7 May 2020 (aged 47) London, England
- Genre: Hip hop
- Occupations: Vocalist, rapper, producer
- Instrument: Vocals
- Years active: 1990s–2020
- Labels: BBE, Big Dada, Jazz re:freshed
- Website: tymusic.co.uk

Benedict Okwuchukwu Godwin Chijioke // (17 August 1972 – 7 May 2020), better known by his stage name Ty /ˈtaɪ/, was a Nigerian-British rapper. He released the albums Awkward (2001), Upwards (2003), Closer (2006), Special Kind of Fool (2010) and A Work of Heart (2018). Upwards was nominated for a Mercury Prize. Ty collaborated with musicians such as Shortee Blitz, Drew Horley, Tony Allen, Roots Manuva and De La Soul.

== Early life ==
Benedict Okwuchukwu Godwin Chijioke was born in London into an Igbo family from Nigeria. He spent many years of his youth in the care of private foster parents in Jaywick, Essex—as reported in a 2019 Channel 4 News feature by Symeon Brown— "so they could focus on work and study." In the piece he said: "As kids we had no clue why we were here, and then my parents said 'we're going now, but you're staying'," he said. "So we didn't know why we were being left here. And just feeling a little bit abandoned really."

== Career ==
In the early 1990s, he was discovered after competing at the open mic competition at Muthaland at the Borderline in London's West End. He continued to hone his skills and make connections there for a few years. In 1995, he co-founded Ghetto Grammar, a pioneer in hip hop education in the UK. Ty's first album, Awkward, was released on Big Dada in 2001. His second album, Upwards, was released in 2003 and reached No.35 in the UK Independent album charts. The single from it, "Oh U Want More?", reached No.65 in the UK Top 100. Upwards was nominated for a Mercury Prize in 2004. His third album, Closer, was released in 2006, and featured guest appearances from De La Soul, Speech, Bahamadia, Zion I, and others.

He left the Big Dada label in 2007, saying "there's a time when you ... acknowledge that the people either have lost faith in what you're doing or are no longer interested in what you're doing" and experimented with spoken word for a period. He returned in 2010 with the album Special Kind of Fool, released by Barely Breaking Even. The BBC described it as "a mixture of uncompromising rap and populist soulfulness, often playing side-by-side". His final album, A Work of Heart, was released in 2018 on the contemporary jazz label Jazz re:freshed. In 2019, he was joined by Blak Twang and Rodney P to form Kingdem, which The New York Times called a "supergroup of British rap elders".

== Death ==
On 7 May 2020, Chijioke died in hospital, aged 47, due to pneumonia after intensive treatment for COVID-19 during the COVID-19 pandemic in England. He had previously been admitted into a hospital in early April but had been moved out of the intensive care unit on 19 April. Several memorials were painted for him in and around Brixton to honour his legacy.

== Discography ==
=== Albums ===
- Awkward (Big Dada, 2001)
- Upwards (Big Dada, 2003)
- Closer (Big Dada, 2006)
- Special Kind of Fool (BBE, 2010)
- A Work of Heart (Jazz re:freshed, 2018)

=== EPs ===
- Kick, Snare and an Idea (2013)

Collaborative EPs

- I.A.A.D. (I Am a Don) by Ty & Shortee Blitz (Wayward, 1998)
- The Kingdem EP by Kingdem (Rodney P, Ty and Blak Twang) (2019)

=== Singles ===
- "Oh U Want More?" (2004) – UK No. 65
