= David McEwan (producer) =

- Born: 1972 (age 53–54); Melbourne, Australia
- Genres: Hip-hop, pop, funk, electronic, rock, folk
- Occupations: Sound Designer, Record producer, engineer, composer, remixer, mixer
- Instruments: Bass guitar, guitar, vocals, programming
- Years active: 1990–present
- Labels: 679 Recordings, Atlantic, V2
- Website: www.thesanctuarystudio.co.uk

David McEwan (born 1972) is an Australian sound designer, record producer, engineer, composer, and a member of the band The Safires. He is the co-owner of The Sanctuary Recording Studio in London and is best known for his work on the award-winning Plan B album The Defamation of Strickland Banks. He has also had long time production connections with musician Nitin Sawhney. David McEwan is also the son of the Australian actor Colin McEwan.

McEwan is part of the Blanknote writing and production team.

== History ==
Born in 1972 in Melbourne, Australia, David McEwan is the son of mother Pamela and father Colin McEwan, a well-known Australian actor. McEwan started his musical career as a live sound engineer with touring bands in Australia and playing in bands himself. He soon began writing and producing music for television and radio commercials at this time which led, on relocation to London, to work with MTV Europe and VH1 UK. He also is a composer with Lounge Productions UK. In 2006, he set up The Sanctuary Recording Studio with partner Eric Appapoulay.

== Career ==
=== Band ===
David McEwan is currently a member of the band The Safires. Their music has been compared to a style combining that of The Cranberries, Sarah McLachlan & The Sundays. McEwan is responsible in the group for bass, electronics and programming.

=== Production ===
McEwan has done long time work for Nitin Sawhney. Since 1998 he has been working as both the live and studio engineer for Nitin Sawhney. His most current project includes mixing Sawhney's music for the new BBC Human Planet series.

He also produced tracks for British MC/Singer Plan B for his number 1 award winning album "The Defamation of Strickland Banks" including the top 10 single "She Said". The bulk of the material on The Defamation Of Strickland Banks was recorded by David McEwan and co-owner Eric Appapoulay at their own studio in South London, The Sanctuary Recording Studio. Partly because they were simultaneously working on its hip-hop counterpart.

After the albums completions it shot to the top of the European charts, won several awards in 2010 and is nominated for February 2011's Brit Award for 2 awards including the MasterCard British Album of the Year Award.

== Discography ==
=== Production ===
- 1999 Nitin Sawhney – Beyond Skin (Outcaste, PIAS UK, Sony DADC)
- 2001 Nitin Sawhney – Prophesy (V2 Records) (679 Recordings)
- 2003 Cirque Du Soleil – Varekai (album) (Cirque Du Soleil)
- 2005 Nitin Sawhney – Philtre (V2 Records)
- 2010 The Safires – Epic in the Ordinary
- 2010 Plan B – The Defamation of Strickland Banks (679 Recordings, Atlantic Records)
- 2011 Nitin Sawhney – BBC Human Planet series
- 2012 Garou – "Rhythm and Blues"
