= The Sanctuary (recording studio) =

Coordinates: 51°28′27″N 0°9′14″W

The Sanctuary is a recording studio in Battersea, London founded by David McEwan and Eric Appapoulay in 2006. It is best known as the facility at which Plan B created his 2010 award winning album The Defamation of Strickland Banks.

The Sanctuary is the home of the SMV writing and production team.

== Equipment ==
The Sanctuary Recording Studio is a Pro Tools-free zone, running instead on a “rock solid” Apogee Symphony system. The studio boasts a very personal collection of gear — including many monitor speakers, a drum kit that is permanently set up with 16 microphones. a 5.1 system consisting of five APS Aeons and an ADAM sub, TL Audio valve mixer, an SSL XLogic summing mixer, an SSL XRack also provides gating and compression. It also has a Westwick 4kVA balanced power transformer.

In addition, prominent in both The Sanctuary Recording Studio and on The Defamation of Strickland Banks is Eric Appapoulay’s upright piano. Ben Drew explained that “Because of how old it is, and some things are slightly out of tune, it reminded me of those old hip-hop records where the sampled piano does sound a little but gritty,” “That’s why I loved it. It looks great and it’s got a proper resonance.”
