= Kano discography =

Discography for UK MC Kano

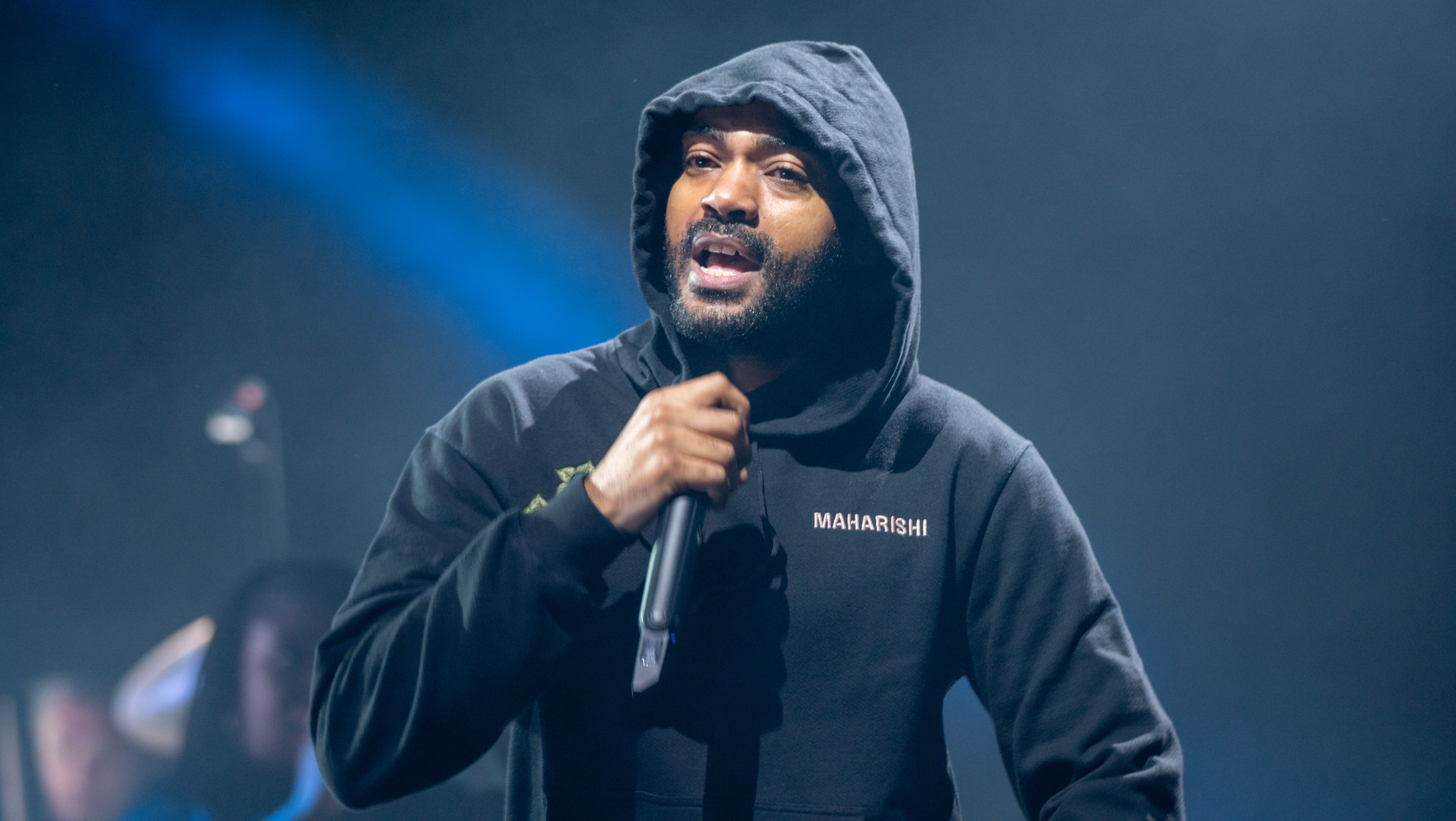
- Studio albums: 6
- Singles: 19
- Mixtapes: 6
- EPs: 3

British hip hop musician Kano has released six studio albums, three EPs, six mixtapes and nineteen singles.

== Albums ==
=== Studio albums ===
| Album title | Album details | Peak chart positions | Certifications |
| Album title | Album details | UK | Certifications |
|---|---|---|---|
| Home Sweet Home | Released: 27 June 2005; Label: 679; Formats: CD, LP, digital download | 36 | BPI: Gold |
| London Town | Released: 10 September 2007; Label: 679; Formats: CD, digital download | 14 | BPI: Silver |
| 140 Grime Street | Released: 29 September 2008; Label: Bigger Picture Music; Formats: CD, digital download | 48 | |
| Method to the Maadness | Released: 30 August 2010; Label: Bigger Picture Music; Formats: CD, digital download | 45 | |
| Made in the Manor | Released: 4 March 2016; Label: Parlophone, Bigger Picture Music; Formats: CD, LP, digital download, Streaming | 8 | BPI: Gold |
| Hoodies All Summer | Released: 30 August 2019; Label: Parlophone, Bigger Picture Music; Formats: CD, LP, digital download, Streaming | 8 | BPI: Silver |

=== Mixtapes ===
- 2005: Beats + Bars
- 2007: Kano Mixtape
- 2008: MC No. 1
- 2010: Jack Bauer: The 7 Day Edition
- 2011: Girls Over Guns
- 2012: Jack Bauer 2.4

=== EPs ===
- 2008: 48 Bars Vol. 1 EP
- 2011: Not 4 the A List EP
- 2012: Wavy EP

== Singles ==
=== As lead artist ===
| Year | Title | Chart positions | | | Certifications | Album |
| Year | Title | UK | UK R&B | UK Indie | Certifications | Album |
|---|---|---|---|---|---|---|
| 2004 | "P's and Q's" | — | — | — | BPI: Gold | Home Sweet Home |
| 2005 | "Typical Me" (feat. Ghetts) | 22 | 6 | 81 | | Home Sweet Home |
| 2005 | "Remember Me" | 71 | — | 20 | | Home Sweet Home |
| 2005 | "Nite Nite" (feat. Leo the Lion and The Streets) | 25 | 4 | 54 | BPI: Silver | Home Sweet Home |
| 2006 | "Brown Eyes" / "Signs in Life" | — | — | — | | Home Sweet Home |
| 2006 | "Buss It Up" (feat. Vybz Kartel) | — | — | — | | London Town |
| 2007 | "This Is the Girl" (feat. Craig David) | 18 | 7 | 34 | | London Town |
| 2007 | "Feel Free" (feat. Damon Albarn) | — | 12 | — | | London Town |
| 2008 | "Hustler" | — | — | — | | 140 Grime Street |
| 2009 | "Rock n Roller" | 44 | 18 | 68 | | |
| 2010 | "More Than One Way" | — | — | — | | |
| 2010 | "Get Wild" (feat. Aidonia and Wiley) | — | — | — | | Method to the Maadness |
| 2010 | "Upside" (feat. Michelle Breeze) | 98 | 31 | — | | Method to the Maadness |
| 2010 | "Spaceship" | — | — | — | | Method to the Maadness |
| 2015 | "Hail" / "New Banger" | — | — | — | | Made in the Manor |
| 2015 | "Garage Skank Freestyle" | — | — | — | BPI: Silver | Made in the Manor |
| 2016 | "3 Wheel-Ups" (featuring Wiley and Giggs) | 126 | — | — | BPI: Gold | Made in the Manor |
| 2019 | "Trouble" | — | — | — | | Hoodies All Summer |
| 2019 | "Class of Deja" (featuring D Double E and Ghetts) | — | — | — | | Hoodies All Summer |
"—" denotes single that did not chart or was not released.

=== As featured artist ===
| Year | Title | Chart Positions | | | Album |
| Year | Title | UK | UK R&B | UK Indie | Album |
|---|---|---|---|---|---|
| 2005 | "Routine Check" (The Mitchell Brothers feat. Kano and The Streets) | 42 | 9 | — | A Breath of Fresh Attire |
| 2008 | "Stryderman Remix" (Tinchy Stryder feat. Wiley and Kano) | — | — | — | Stryderman |
| 2009 | "Against All Odds" (Chase & Status feat. Kano) | 45 | — | — | More Than Alot |
| 2010 | "White Flag" (Gorillaz feat. Bashy and Kano) | — | — | — | Plastic Beach |
| 2011 | "Pow 2011" (Lethal Bizzle feat. JME, Wiley, Chipmunk, Face, P Money, Ghetts and Kano) | 33 | 10 | 4 | Best of Bizzle |
| 2011 | "Semantics" (Amplify Dot feat. Kano) | — | — | — | Semantics |
| 2011 | "Wine De Best" (Orange Hill feat. Kano, Busy Signal and Fatman Scoop) | — | — | — | Wine De Best |
| 2011 | "Still Speedin' Remix" (Sway feat. Kano) | — | 3 | — | The Deliverance |
| 2012 | "Earthquake (All Stars Mix)" (Labrinth feat. Tinie Tempah, Kano, Wretch 32 & Busta Rhymes) | — | — | — | Electronic Earth |
| 2012 | "Live Once" (Plan B feat. Kano) | — | — | — | Ill Manors |
| 2012 | "Mayhem" (Clement Marfo & The Frontline feat. Kano) | — | — | — | Mayhem |
| 2012 | "Please" (Jakwob feat. Kano) | — | — | — | The Prize |
| 2012 | "Greatness" (Tanya Lacey feat. Kano) | — | — | — | Head Chef |
| 2012 | "Beamer" (Melé feat. Kano) | — | — | — | Beamer |
| 2013 | "Worry About You" (Tyler James feat. Kano) | 38 | — | — | A Place I Go |
| 2013 | "Forefather" (Benga feat. Kano) | — | — | — | Chapter II |
| 2013 | "First Class" (Wiley feat. Lethal Bizzle and Kano) | — | — | — | The Ascent |
| 2013 | "They Got it all Wrong Remix" (Lethal Bizzle feat. Krept & Konan, Squeeks, Wiley and Kano) | — | — | — | They Got It All Wrong |
| 2013 | "Lay Her Down" (Skepta feat. Kano) | — | — | — | Blacklisted |
| 2013 | "Party Animal" (Ghetts feat. Kano) | — | — | — | None Album Single |
| 2020 | "Dead Butterflies" (Gorillaz featuring Kano & Roxani Arias) | — | — | — | Song Machine, Season One: Strange Timez |

=== Promotional singles ===
| Year | Title | Album |
|---|---|---|
| 2004 | "Mic Fight" (feat. Demon and Wiley) | Run the Road |

== Other charted songs ==
| Year | Title | Chart positions | | Album |
| Year | Title | UK | UK R&B | Album |
|---|---|---|---|---|
| "Pan-Fried" (featuring Kojo Funds) | 2019 | 70 | — | Hoodies All Summer |
| "Teardrops" | 2019 | 95 | — | Hoodies All Summer |
| "Chapter 16" | 2025 | 11 | 3 | The Boy Who Played the Harp |
