= MOBO Awards 2016 =

2016 edition of award ceremony

- Awarded for: Excellence in music of black origin
- Date: 4 November 2016
- Location: SSE Hydro, Glasgow, Scotland
- Country: United Kingdom
- Hosted by: Rickie Haywood Williams; Melvin Odoom

Highlights
- Most wins: 15 different winners (1 each)
- Most nominations: Kano and Laura Mvula (4 each)
- Album of the Year: Kano – Made in the Manor
- Website: mobo.com

Television/radio coverage
- Network: ITV2 (live coverage); ITV (deferred)

The MOBO Awards 2016 ceremony was held at SSE Hydro in Glasgow on 4 November 2016 and hosted by radio broadcasting duo Rickie Haywood Williams and Melvin Odoom; it was live streamed on ITV2, later deferred on ITV.

Nominees were announced on 21 September 2016, with Kano and Laura Mvula leading the field with four nominations each. The ceremony featured 15 award categories, with each going to a different act.

During the Best Song category, a major envelope mix-up led the hosts to incorrectly announce WSTRN as winners for "In2", while "Robbery (Remix)" by Abra Cadabra featuring Krept & Konan played in the background — the actual winning track. MOBO organisers later apologised, holding a "production error" accountable for the mix-up.

== Performers ==
The following artists performed at the ceremony.

List of performers at the MOBO Awards 2016
Artist(s)
Popcaan
Craig David
Lady Leshurr
Professor Green
Chase & Status
Laura Mvula
Fekky & Section Boyz
Anne-Marie & Clean Bandit
WSTRN
Izzy Bizu

== Winners and nominees ==
Winners appear first and highlighted in bold.

**Best Album**: **Made in the Manor – Kano**; The Dreaming Room – Laura Mvula; Landlord – Giggs; Love & Hate – Michael Kiwanuka; Konnichiwa – Skepta	**Best Song**: **"Robbery" (Remix) – Abra Cadabra feat. Krept & Konan**; "When the Bassline Drops" – Craig David feat. Big Narstie; "3 Wheel-Ups" – Kano feat. Giggs & Wiley; "Girls Like" – Tinie Tempah feat. Zara Larsson; "In2" – WSTRN; "Blue Lights" – Jorja Smith; "Runnin' (Lose It All)" – Naughty Boy feat. Beyoncé & Arrow Benjamin; "Funny" – Chase & Status feat. Frisco; "You Dun Know Already" – Ghetts; "Who Do You Think Of?" – M.O; "Friendly" – J Hus; "Wobble" – Lethal Bizzle
**Best Newcomer**: **WSTRN**; 67; AJ Tracey; Avelino; Izzy Bizu; Mostack; Kojey Radical; Nadia Rose; Ray BLK; Anne-Marie	**Best Video**: **"Skwod" – Nadia Rose (Director: Reece Proctor)**; "Phenomenal Woman" – Laura Mvula; "Footsteps" – Kojey Radical; "Borders" – M.I.A.; "Moving" – Bugzy Malone
**Best Female Act**: **Lady Leshurr**; Katy B; Laura Mvula; Little Simz; NAO	**Best Male Act**: **Craig David**; Skepta; Stormzy; Kano; Tinie Tempah
**Best Grime Act**: **Chip**; AJ Tracey; Kano; Skepta; Stormzy	**Best R&B/Soul Act**: **Shakka**; NAO; James Blake; Michael Kiwanuka; Laura Mvula
**Best Hip Hop Act**: **Section Boyz**; Giggs; Little Simz; Fekky; Wretch 32	**Best International Act**: **Drake**; Anderson .Paak; Beyoncé; Bryson Tiller; Chance the Rapper; Frank Ocean; Kanye West; Kaytranada; PartyNextDoor; Rihanna; Justin Bieber; Tory Lanez; DJ Khaled; Major Lazer; Travis Scott
**Best Gospel Act**: **Guvna B**; Volney Morgan and New-Ye; Sarah Téibo; S.O.; Andrew Bello	**Best Jazz Act**: **Esperanza Spalding**; Bill Laurance; Michael Janisch; Jacob Collier; Cory Henry
**Best African Act**: **Wizkid**; Mr Eazi; Moelogo; Tekno Miles; Tiwa Savage; Yemi Alade; Olamide; Mista Silva; Eugy; Kwamz & Flava	**Best Reggae Act**: **Popcaan**; Alkaline; Spice; Protoje; Kranium
