= Nite Nite =

2005 single by Kano

Single by Kano featuring Leo the Lion and The Streets

from the album Home Sweet Home
- Released: 12 September 2005
- Genre: British hip-hop; grime
- Length: 4:46
- Label: 679
- Songwriters: Kane Robinson; Mike Skinner
- Producer: Mike Skinner

Kano featuring Leo the Lion and The Streets singles chronology
"Remember Me" (2005)	"Nite Nite" (2005)	"Brown Eyes / Signs in Life" (2006)

"Nite Nite" is a song by British rapper Kano, featuring singer Leo the Lion and Mike Skinner of the Streets. It was released on 12 September 2005 by 679 Recordings as a single from Kano's debut studio album, Home Sweet Home. Written by Kano and Skinner and produced by Skinner, the song peaked at number 25 on the UK Singles Chart and number four on the UK Hip Hop and R&B Singles Chart.

== Background and composition ==
"Nite Nite" was written by Kano and Mike Skinner, with Skinner also producing the track. The album version runs for four minutes and 46 seconds.

An early version of the song was titled "Long Ting". In its review of the single, NME described its development from a song about unsuccessful encounters with women into a more romantic track. Gigwise characterised the finished recording as a soulful, piano-driven song, featuring contributions from Skinner and Leo the Lion.

== Release ==
The single was released in the United Kingdom on 12 September 2005. Its accompanying B-sides included "Get Set", a remix of "Nobody Don't Dance No More", and a High Contrast remix of "Reload It".

== Critical reception ==
NME reviewed the single positively, praising Kano's delivery and the combination of romantic subject matter and humour. The review also argued that Kano maintained a strong presence alongside Skinner's contribution.

== Music video ==
The music video was directed by Robert Hales. In a November 2005 interview with Rapnews, Kano stated that the video had been filmed in Málaga, Spain. He described the shoot as involving both work and time to relax while the other performers filmed their parts.

== Chart performance ==
"Nite Nite" entered and peaked at number 25 on the UK Singles Chart in the chart week ending 24 September 2005. It spent two weeks in the top 40 and six weeks in the top 75. The single also peaked at number four on the UK Hip Hop and R&B Singles Chart.

Chart (2005)	Peak position
UK Singles (Official Charts)	25
UK Hip Hop/R&B (Official Charts)	4
