= On Purpose, with Purpose =

Studio album by Ghetts
- Released: 23 February 2024
- Length: 64:15
- Label: Warner
- Producer: Emil; Etienne Lutanki; Reiss Nicholas; R-Kay; Splurgeboys; TenBillion Dreams

Ghetts chronology
| Conflict of Interest (2021) | On Purpose, with Purpose (2024) |

Singles from On Purpose, with Purpose
- 1. "Laps" Released: 20 October 2023; 2. "Twin Sisters" Released: 20 December 2023; 3. "Tumbi" Released: 29 January 2024; 4. "Double Standards" Released: 8 February 2024

On Purpose, with Purpose is the fourth studio album by British rapper Ghetts, released on 23 February 2024 through Warner Records. It features guest appearances from Kano, Wretch 32, Sampha, Unknown T, Lancey Foux, Moonchild Sanelly, Skrapz, Shakka, Jay Angelo, Dexta Daps, Harry Aye, Muzi, Tiggs da Author and Pip Millett. The album received positive reviews from critics, and was nominated for the 2024 Mercury Prize.

== Background ==
A release statement revealed that the album sees "new heights as a songwriter" for the rapper and expands his "sonic palette", including soul, R&B, Afrobeat, amapiano and gospel. The lead single "Laps" featuring Moonchild Sanelly, whom he had collaborated with before on "Mozambique" (2020), was released accompanying the album announcement on 20 October 2023. Ghetts unveiled the album artwork designed by British-Nigerian artist Olaolu Slawn through a teaser on his social media. Kicking off the era in early 2024, Ghetts announced a few UK tour dates slated for March 2024. While the album was initially announced for release on 5 January 2024, it was later postponed to 2 February.

== Content ==
On Purpose, with Purpose features influence from multiple genres – in addition to energetic, lyrically driven grime tracks, the album also explores Afrobeats and amapiano. "Mount Rushmore", featuring Kano and Wretch 32, was noted as a track that particularly emphasizes Ghetts' grime roots. "Stylish Nxxxa" and "Blood On My Hands" were also acknowledged as among the album's most energetic moments. The Afrobeats and amapiano influences were identified most strongly on tracks such as "Tumbi", "Gbedu", "Blessings", and "Hallelujah".

On Purpose, with Purpose was also noted for its emphasis on socially conscious subject matter. "Double Standards", a "powerful, politically charged" song that features Sampha, explores topics such as "hypocrisy, colourism, paedophilia and prejudice". "Jonah's Safety" discusses postpartum depression and abortion.

== Critical reception ==
Professional ratings
Aggregate scores
| Source | Rating |
|---|---|
| Metacritic | 81/100 |
Review scores
| Source | Rating |
| Clash | 8/10 |
| DIY | 4.5/5 stars |
| NME | 4/5 stars |
| The Observer | 4/5 stars |

At Metacritic, which assigns a weighted average score out of 100 to reviews from mainstream critics, On Purpose, with Purpose received an average score of 81 based on 6 reviews, indicating "universal acclaim". Critics praised Ghetts' emphasis on storytelling throughout the album, as well as his usage of social commentary. The album was also noted for managing to remain sonically cohesive, even with the prevalence of guest artists and the exploration of Afrobeats. Producer TenBillion Dreams received particular acclaim for complementing Ghetts' style. Ghetts' more restrained delivery on the album did receive some criticism, however: Joe Simpson of Clash opined that the album "slightly loses momentum in the middle", and Damien Morris of NME expressed a desire to see "a couple more heaters".

Morris, as well as Seth Pereira of NME, drew a contrast between Ghetts and André 3000, remarking on the two rappers' divergent attitudes toward aging. Where André released an album dramatically different from his previous discography (2023's New Blue Sun), the two critics observed that Ghetts instead sought to create a "thoughtful, impassioned" album that further refined his existing style.

== Track listing ==
On Purpose, with Purpose track listing
| No. | Title | Writer(s) | Producer(s) (Note: All producers are also credited for programming) | Length |
|---|---|---|---|---|
| 1. | "Intro" | Justin Clarke-Samuel; Rio Willis | TenBillion Dreams | 3:49 |
| 2. | "Mount Rushmore" (featuring Kano and Wretch 32) | J. Clarke-Samuel; Ayeisha Raquel; Emil Larbi; Robert Kiruta-Kigozi; Jermaine Scott; Kane Robinson; Arthur Jones; Milton Biggham; Davi Carvalho | Emil | 5:05 |
| 3. | "Double Standards" (featuring Sampha) | J. Clarke-Samuel; Larbi; Sampha Sisay | Emil; R-Kay | 5:01 |
| 4. | "Anakin (Red Saber)" | J. Clarke-Samuel; Willis | TenBillion Dreams | 3:41 |
| 5. | "Blood on My Hands" (featuring Unknown T) | J. Clarke-Samuel; Willis; Daniel Lena | TenBillion Dreams | 3:49 |
| 6. | "Stylish Nxxxa" (featuring Lancey Foux) | J. Clarke-Samuel | | 2:52 |
| 7. | "Laps" (featuring Moonchild Sanelly) | J. Clarke-Samuel; Willis; Sanelisiwe Twisha | TenBillion Dreams | 3:49 |
| 8. | "Twin Sisters" (featuring Skrapz) | J. Clarke-Samuel; Willis; Christopher Kyei | TenBillion Dreams | 4:39 |
| 9. | "Mine" (featuring Shakka) | J. Clarke-Samuel; Willis; Shakka Philip | TenBillion Dreams | 2:25 |
| 10. | "More Than I Required" (featuring Jay Angelo) | J. Clarke-Samuel; Jonathan Rhamie | Jay Angelo | 1:19 |
| 11. | "Hallelujah" (featuring Dexta Daps) | J. Clarke-Samuel; Kadeem Clarke-Samuel; Terrell Farrell; Louis Grandison | Kadz; Tee | 3:04 |
| 12. | "Gbedu" (featuring Harry Aye) | J. Clarke-Samuel; Harry Portman; Adetokundo Ayelabola; Reiss Nicholas | Nicholas | 3:25 |
| 13. | "Tumbi" | J. Clarke-Samuel; Tyrone Gaitskell Fagan | Splurge Boys | 2:46 |
| 14. | "Blessings" (featuring Muzi) | J. Clarke-Samuel; Nicholas; Muziwakhe Mazibuko; Etienne Lutanki | Nicholas; Lutanki | 3:55 |
| 15. | "Grateful (Interlude)" | J. Clarke-Samuel; Nicholas | Nicholas | 1:41 |
| 16. | "Street Politics" (featuring Tiggs da Author) | J. Clarke-Samuel; Larbi; Adam Simon | Emil | 3:44 |
| 17. | "Jonah's Safety" (featuring Pip Millett) | J. Clarke-Samuel; Nicholas; Georgia Willacy | Nicholas | 4:12 |
| 18. | "Expiry Date (Outro)" | J. Clarke-Samuel; Larbi | Emil; R-Kay | 4:59 |
| Total length: | | | | 64:15 |

== Personnel ==
- Ghetts – vocals
- Jay Angelo – mixing, vocal engineering (track 10)
- Mikey J – vocal engineering (track 2)
- Joe LaPorta – mastering
- Blue May – mixing
- Ben Oakland – vocal engineering (tracks 1–3, 5, 7, 8, 11–17)
- TenBillion Dreams – vocal engineering (tracks 3, 4, 7, 9)
- Emanuel J Burton - drums (track 1)

== Charts ==
Chart performance for On Purpose, with Purpose
| Chart (2024) | Peak position |
|---|---|
| UK Albums (OCC) | 29 |
| UK R&B Albums (OCC) | 2 |
