= Method to the Maadness =

Studio album by Kano
- Released: 30 August 2010
- Recorded: 2010
- Genres: British hip hop; electronic
- Length: 46:42
- Label: Bigger Picture Music
- Producers: A13; Boys Noize; Chase & Status; Craigie Dodds; Fraser T Smith; Hot Chip; Kano

Kano chronology
140 Grime Street (2008)	Method to the Maadness (2010)	Made in the Manor (2016)

Singles from Method to the Maadness
- 1. "Get Wild" Released: 10 June 2010; 2. "Upside" Released: 22 August 2010; 3. "Spaceship" Released: 2010

Method to the Maadness is the fourth studio album by British rapper Kano, released on 30 August 2010 by Bigger Picture Music. The album has contributions from several artists including Wiley, Boys Noize, Hot Chip, Chase & Status and Damon Albarn.

== Background ==
During an interview with the blog Social Writers, Kano said that "It was really important to me that it really made sense as an album. I didn't want it to be single driven. I really wanted it to have substance in the tracks, really wanted it to the track [sic] to mean something to me, I really wanted to experiment and make the album very exciting". He also described his progression on Method to the Maadness, as an MC from his first album Home Sweet Home: "I didn’t really know what I was doing on that album (Home Sweet Home). It's about progression with every album, learning from the last and just getting a little bit more educated and more experienced as a performer and as a recording artist, as a writer and a producer and co-producer. So, I feel I've definitely progressed".

== Singles ==
Three singles have been released from the album: "Get Wild", featuring Aidonia and Wiley, "Upside", featuring Michelle Breeze from Why Why Peaches, and "Spaceship", featuring production from Chase & Status and additional vocals from Takura Tendayi.

== Critical reception ==
Professional ratings
Review scores
Source	Rating
Clash	7/10
The Guardian	4/5 stars
The Telegraph	3/5 stars

Will Dean of The Guardian wrote that Method to the Maadnes is "a record that deserves at least a modicum of Rascalesque success." Matt Oliver of Clash concluded that "While room for improvement remains, less culpable decisions are made compared to the pleased-to conform London Town. Kano’s well back on track to reclaiming grime’s all-rounder crown." In a review for BBC Music, Sam Hesketh stated: "Kano hasn't reached the peaks of his debut album here, but when it works, Maadness works very well indeed. He's a talented rapper, and his lyrics are on point for the vast majority of the record; but let's hope he works exclusively to his strengths next time instead of trying to be experimental for the sake of it." Anna Trench of The Telegraph wrote: "Grime star Kano’s third album is a mixed bag. Half the tracks feature guests, and although on the whole these work well, one wonders how dependant he is on his collaborators. You can still hear his roots in the raw opener 2 Left: Topic of Discussion. As a lyricist he’s impressive, particularly on "Spaceship" and "All + All Together": perceptive, current and sometimes sad, but with just the right amount of swagger and wit."

== Chart performance ==
The album entered the UK Album Chart at number 45 despite a strong marketing push.

== Track listing ==
No.	Title	Writer(s)	Producer(s)	Length
1.	"2 Left: Topic of Discussion"	Kane Robinson; Ridha	Boys Noize	4:51
2.	"Get Wild" (featuring Wiley and Aidonia)	Robinson; Ridha; Richard Cowie; Aidonia	Boys Noize	3:52
3.	"iPod Generation"	Robinson	Kano	0:55
4.	"Maad"	Robinson; Fraser T Smith	Kano; Fraser T Smith	3:24
5.	"Spaceship"	Robinson; Kennard; Milton	Chase & Status	4:31
6.	"Upside" (featuring Michelle Breeze)	Robinson; Dodds	Craigie Dodds	3:04
7.	"All + All Together" (featuring Hot Chip)	Robinson; Taylor; Goddard; Doyle	Hot Chip	3:40
8.	"Lady Killer" (featuring Ghetts)	Robinson; Ghetts; Taylor; Goddard; Doyle	Hot Chip	2:31
9.	"Bassment" (featuring Damon Albarn)	Robinson; Albarn	A13	2:44
10.	"Crazy"	Robinson; Ridha	Boys Noize	3:38
11.	"Slaves" (featuring Why Why Peaches)	Robinson; Dodds; Breeze; Allen	Craigie Dodds	4:50
12.	"Jenga" (featuring Vybz Kartel)	Robinson; Ridha; Pentz; Palmer	Boys Noize	3:59
13.	"Dark Days"	Robinson; Dodds	Craigie Dodds	4:48

ITunes Store bonus track
No.	Title	Writer(s)	Producer(s)	Length
14.	"Til I Found You"	Robinson; Hugo	Johan Hugo	3:38
