= Rebel with a Cause =

Rebel with a Cause may refer to:

- Rebel with a Cause (album), a 2014 album by Ghetts
- "Rebel with a Cause", episode 106 of the TV series Hercules: The Legendary Journeys (1999)
- Rebel with a Cause (TV series), a 2023 Australian documentary TV series
