= This Is the Girl =

Single by Kano featuring Craig David

from the album London Town and Trust Me
- B-side: "F*** the Chorus"
- Released: 27 August 2007
- Genre: British hip-hop; grime
- Label: 679; Warner Bros.
- Songwriters: Kano; Fraser T. Smith; Craig David
- Producers: Kano; Fraser T. Smith; Craig David

Kano singles chronology
"Buss It Up" (2006)	"This Is the Girl" (2007)	"Feel Free" (2007)

Craig David singles chronology
"Unbelievable" (2006)	"This is the Girl" (2007)	"Hot Stuff (Let's Dance)" (2007)

Music video
- "This is the Girl" on YouTube

"This is the Girl" is the first single from British rapper Kano's second studio album London Town and the first from British singer Craig David's fourth studio album, Trust Me. The song was released in 2007 and reached its peak of number 18 in the UK charts on 18 September 2007.

The song samples lyrics from Jay-Z's song "Big Pimpin'", with Kano replacing Jay-Z's lyric "Under the canopy, my stamina be enough for Pamela Anderson Lee" with "Under the canopy, my stamina be enough for Angelina Jolie".

== Music video ==
The music video starts off with Kano finishing rapping "London Town" in a concert, then the music of "This Is the Girl" starts, while Kano is writing the lyrics for the song with headphones on. The rest of the video has Kano and Craig David performing in a studio and Kano on a tour bus, with girls coming up to him, but he rejects them. Directed by Paul Minor.

== Formats and track listings ==
UK CD:

1. "This Is the Girl" (radio edit)
2. "P's & Q's" (live)

UK 7" vinyl:

1. "This Is the Girl" (album version)

UK 12" vinyl:

1. "This Is the Girl" (radio edit)
2. "This Is the Girl" (album version)
3. "F*** the Chorus"
4. "F*** the Chorus" (instrumental)

== Chart performance ==
"This Is the Girl" peaked at number eighteen on the UK singles chart and is Kano's highest-charting single in the UK, spending ten weeks inside the UK top 75, only one week less than David's second single from Trust Me, "Hot Stuff (Let's Dance)", which peaked inside the top ten.

Chart (2007)	Peak position
UK Singles (Official Charts)	18
UK Hip Hop/R&B (Official Charts)	7
