= 3 Wheel-Ups =

2016 single by Kano

Single by Kano featuring Wiley and Giggs

from the album Made in the Manor
- Released: 7 January 2016
- Recorded: 2015
- Genre: British hip hop; grime
- Length: 4:38
- Label: Parlophone; Warner; Bigger Picture Music
- Songwriters: Kane Robinson; Richard Cowie Jr.; Nathaniel Thompson
- Producer: Swifta Beater

Kano singles chronology
"GarageSkankFreestyle" (2015)	"3 Wheel-Ups" (2016)	"Trouble" (2019)

Wiley singles chronology
"Chasing the Art" (2015)	"3 Wheel-Ups" (2016)	"Can't Go Wrong" (2016)

Giggs singles chronology
"More Ratatatin" (2015)	"3 Wheel-Ups" (2016)	"Whippin' Excursion" (2016)

Music video
- "3 Wheel-Ups" on YouTube

"3 Wheel-Ups" is a song by British rapper Kano from his fifth studio album Made in the Manor (2016). It features British rappers Wiley and Giggs and was released as the second and final single from the album on 7 January 2016.

== Critical responose ==
Sam Liddicott gave the song a positive review, stating:

'3 Wheel-Ups' is an arresting and intense track where Giggs adds his talents into the mix. A song that demands a lot of spins- some lyrics and ideas may race by upon first listen- it is refreshing seeing a British talent getting better and more authoritative with each passing years. Too many musicians are suffocated by the brevity and capriciousness of the industry. Pop stars arrive and Pop stars dissolve. New bands come along with brighter smiles only to fade away after the first album. Music fans want to find artists that are capable of longevity and profitable returns. Kano’s fan-base have been loyal since his 2005 arrival. Over a decade on, the fan numbers are expanding and new listeners are discovering something exceptional. I just know the future is going to be bright for the 30-year-old M.C. With critics back on his side and early form being rediscovered: Here is a confident young man everyone needs to obey..

In 2019, Complex magazine placed the song at number 13 on their list of "Grime's Most Impactful Songs of the 2010s".

== Commercial performance ==
In the mid-week update chart of the UK Singles Chart, "3 Wheel-Ups" entered at number 84 on 11 January 2016. It failed to reach the top 100, peaking at number 126, although it did peak at number 16 on the UK Hip Hop and R&B Singles Chart.

The song was certified gold by the British Phonographic Industry in October 2023 for surpassing sales of 400,000 units.

== Music video ==
The music video was released to YouTube on 8 January 2016, and was directed by Kano himself. The video features Kano and Giggs, but does not feature Wiley, due to his reputation of not showing up to music video shoots after a stabbing incident back in 2008. Instead, Wiley's verse is cut from the video entirely. As of March 2024, the music video has over 18 million views on YouTube.

== Track listing ==
Digital download
No.	Title	Length
1.	"3 Wheel-Ups" (featuring Wiley and Giggs)	4:38

== Charts ==
Chart (2016)	Peak position
UK Singles (OCC)	126
UK Hip Hop/R&B (OCC)	16
UK Singles Downloads (OCC)	68
UK Singles Sales (OCC)	69

== Certifications ==
Region	Certification	Certified units/sales
United Kingdom (BPI)	Gold	400,000^{‡}
^{‡} Sales+streaming figures based on certification alone.

== Release history ==
Region	Date	Format	Label
United Kingdom	7 January 2016	Digital download	Parlophone
