= London Town (Kano album) =

Studio album by Kano
- Released: 10 September 2007
- Recorded: 2006–07
- Genre: British hip hop; grime
- Length: 52:38
- Label: 679
- Producer: Craig David; Damon Albarn; Don Corleone; Fraser T Smith; Kano; Mikey J; S Clue

Kano chronology
Home Sweet Home (2005)	London Town (2007)	140 Grime St (2008)

Singles from London Town
- 1. "Buss It Up" Released: 11 December 2006; 2. "This Is the Girl" Released: 27 August 2007; 3. "Feel Free" Released: 10 December 2007

Professional ratings
Review scores
Source	Rating
AllMusic	2.5/5 stars
NME	5/10
Pitchfork	4.6/10
Yahoo! Music	8/10

London Town is the second studio album by British rapper Kano, released on 10 September 2007 by 679 Artists. It features guest appearances by Damon Albarn, Vybz Kartel, Craig David, Kate Nash and Leo the Lion. Three singles were released to support the album: "Buss It Up" featuring Kartel, "This Is the Girl" featuring David and "Feel Free" featuring Albarn. London Town debuted at number 14 on the UK Albums Chart.

== Singles ==
The first single, "Buss It Up" featuring Vybz Kartel, was released on 11 December 2006. The second single, "This Is the Girl" featuring Craig David, was released on 27 August 2007. The third and final single, "Feel Free" featuring Damon Albarn, was released on 10 December 2007.

== Track listing ==
No.	Title	Writer(s)	Producer(s)	Length
1.	"The Product"	Robinson; Asante	Mikey J	4:19
2.	"London Town"	Robinson; Asante	Mikey J	4:52
3.	"Buss It Up" (featuring Vybz Kartel)	Robinson; Bennett; Palmer Adidja	Don Carleone	4:45
4.	"Bad Boy" (featuring Craig David)	Robinson; Fraser T. Smith; Craig David	Kano; Smith; David	4:23
5.	"Fightin' the Nation"	Robinson; Smith; David	Smith	4:13
6.	"Feel Free" (featuring Damon Albarn)	Robinson; Smith; Damon Albarn	Robinson; Smith; Albarn	4:02
7.	"Sleep Tight"	Robinson; Asante	Mikey J	4:40
8.	"This Is the Girl" (featuring Craig David)	Robinson; Smith; David	Kano; Smith; David	3:54
9.	"Me & My Microphone" (featuring Kate Nash)	Robinson; Smith	Kano; Smith	3:35
10.	"Over & Over"	Robinson; Asante; Chue	Mikey J; S Clue	4:03
11.	"This Is My Life" (includes hidden track "Grime MC", written by Robinson and Asante)	Robinson; Smith	Smith	9:46
Total length:				52:38

Sample credits

- "Me & My Microphone" contains an interpolation of "Juicy" by The Notorious B.I.G., and "Fake Love" by Tony Yayo.
- "London Town" contains an interpolation of "Still D.R.E.", written and performed by Dr. Dre.
- "Feel Free" contains an interpolation of "Made You Look", written and performed by Nas.
- "This Is the Girl" contains an interpolation of the extended version of "Big Pimpin'", written and performed by Jay Z.
- "Fightin' the Nation" contains an interpolation of "Police and Thieves", performed by Junior Murvin.
- "Bad Boy" contains an interpolation of "Original Nuttah", performed by Shy FX.

== Personnel ==
Credits adapted from AllMusic.

- Damon Albarn – piano, production, featured artist
- Josh Blair – engineering
- Don Corleone – production
- Jason Cox – Engineer
- Craig David – production, featured artist, background vocals
- Tom Elmhirst – mixing
- Steve Fitzmaurice – mixing
- Fraser T. Smith – production, bass, guitar, mixing
- Beni G – scratching
- Pete Hamza – piano
- Nick Ingman – string arrangements, string conductor
- Mikey J. – arrangement, production, featured artist, background vocals
- Matt Jones – photography
- Priscilla Jones – vocals
- Kano – primary artist, mixing, production
- Langdon School Kids – choir
- Chris Laurence – bass
- Mat Maitland – art direction
- Perry Mason – violin
- Kate Nash – featured artist
- Henry Parsley – programming
- Leo Bubba Taylor – drums
- Richard Thomas – management
- Vybz Kartel – featured artist
- Ivo Jan van der Werff – viola
- Jonathan Williams – cello
- Warren Zielinski – violin

== Charts ==
Chart (2007)	Peak position
UK R&B Albums (OCC)	3
UK Albums (OCC)	14

== Certifications ==
Region	Certification	Certified units/sales
United Kingdom (BPI)	Silver	60,000^{‡}
^{‡} Sales+streaming figures based on certification alone.
