= Typical Me =

Single by Kano featuring Ghetts

from the album Home Sweet Home
- B-side: "P's and Q's"
- Released: 28 February 2005
- Genre: Rap rock
- Length: 4:34
- Label: 679 Recordings
- Songwriters: Kano, Ghetts
- Producer: Fraser T Smith

Kano featuring Ghetts singles chronology
"P's and Q's" (2004)	"Typical Me" (2005)	"Remember Me" (2005)

Music video
- "Typical Me" on YouTube

"Typical Me" is a song by London rapper Kano, the second single taken from his debut album Home Sweet Home (2005). The track features vocals from Ghetts and marks Kano's first appearance in the UK Singles Chart.

== Track listing ==
No.	Title	Writer(s)	Producer(s)	Length
1.	"Typical Me" (feat. Ghetts)	Kano, Ghetts	Fraser T Smith	4:34
2.	"P's and Q's"	Kano	DaVinChe	4:08
Total length:				8:42

== Charts ==
Chart (2005)	Peak position
UK Singles (OCC)	22
UK Hip Hop/R&B (OCC)	6
