= Pip Millett =

English singer, songwriter

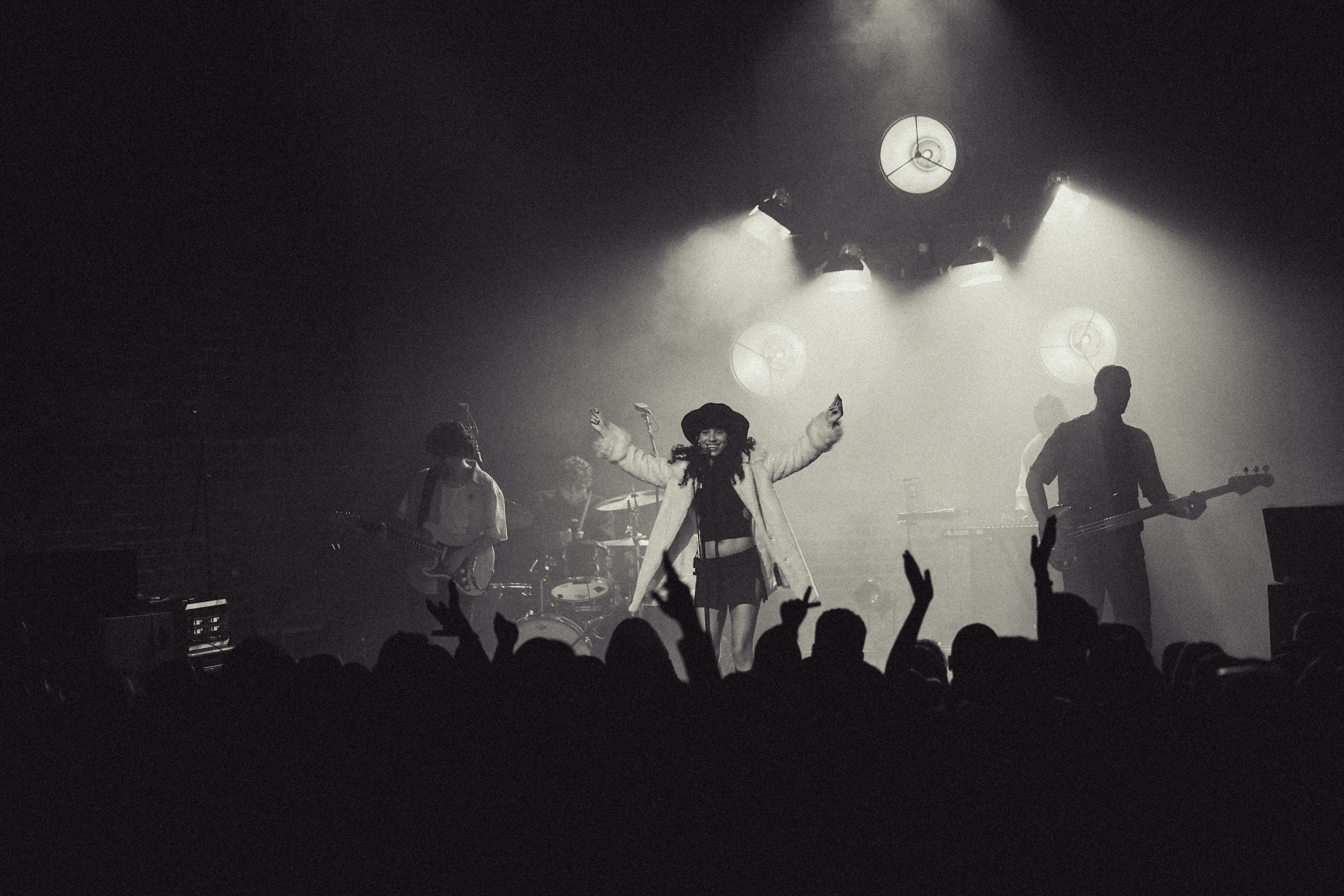
- Pip Millett live at Village Underground, London (2022)

Background information
- Born: Georgia Kate Millett Willacy; Manchester, England
- Genres: R&B; Neo soul
- Years active: 2018–present
- Labels: Dream Life Records / Sony Music, + FOURS
- Website: www.pipmillett.com

Georgia Kate Millett Willacy, known professionally as Pip Millett, is an English singer, songwriter and musician. She made the song “Downright” in 2022.

== Early life and career beginnings ==
Born in Manchester, England, Georgia Willacy was raised on the music of artists such as Joni Mitchell, John Martyn and Bobby Womack. After childhood years learning guitar and singing in choirs, by age 14 she had dedicated herself to the bass guitar and electric guitar. Later she would cite Lauryn Hill, Joni Mitchell, and Bob Marley as her biggest influences.

After considering a career in fashion, she switched her focus to music while at university in London. After Brixton producer and DJ Joe Hertz heard a track that she'd recorded with fellow students, he featured her vocals on "Goodbye Kisses," a single from his 2017 album Night/Daze.

== Career ==
=== 2018-2020 ===
Independent record label and management company + FOURS issued her debut solo single "Make Me Cry", in May 2018. In addition to millions of Spotify streams (over 23 million as of November 2022), a video performance of the track on A COLORS SHOW released in April 2019 has been viewed over five million times. She followed this up with "Love The Things You Do" and later with features on the singles "Run Away" and "Get To Know You", collaborations with Dutch producers Feiertag and Moods respectively.

While continuing her studies she released more singles into 2019, including a cover of "Try a Little Tenderness" that Warner Music distributed and that has been streamed over 10 million times on Spotify. After finishing her degree, she released her debut EP Do Well in June 2019, consisting of four tracks produced by Josh Crocker.

On the strength of these releases she began touring regionally, headlining and selling out shows in London and Manchester.

She released her second EP, the eight-track Lost In June, on 10 April 2020. The production team included Josh Crocker, Lester Salmins and Charlie Perry. Spring 2020 headline shows were postponed because of the COVID-19 pandemic, but touring picked up again the following year. The EP track "Heavenly Mother" has been streamed over 15 million times on Spotify as of November 2022.

=== 2021-Present ===
On 13 August 2021 Dream Life Records / Sony Music released her third EP, Motion Sick, with production from Joice, Josh Crocker and y/siR. It included the track "Running" featuring Ghetts.

Supporting the EP, Pip returned to the stage as the pandemic waned, selling out a series of UK concerts in October 2021. On 23 October she appeared on Later... with Jools Holland, and in December BBC Radio 1Xtra included Pip on their Hot For 2022 list.

She continued touring into 2022, including a sold-out show at Islington Assembly Hall on 12 January.

== Personal life ==
"Pip" is a childhood nickname, and Millett is her mother's maiden name. Her Jamaican father died when she was a teenager.

== Discography ==
=== Albums/EPs ===
Title	Artist	Year	Label	Producer
When Everything Is Better, I'll Let You Know	Pip Millett	2022	Dream Life Records / Sony Music	Alex Goose, Charlie J. Perry, Chase & Status (and 8 more)
Motion Sick	Pip Millett	2021	Dream Life Records / Sony Music	Joice, Josh Crocker, y/Sir
Lost In June	Pip Millett	2020	+ FOURS	Pip Millett, Josh Crocker, Charlie Perry, Lester Duval
Do Well	Pip Millett	2019	+ FOURS	Josh Crocker

=== Singles as Artist ===
Title	Artist	Year	Label	Producer
"Ride With Me"	Pip Millett	2022	Blue Flowers Music / Sony Music	Charlie Perry
"Change My Ways"	Gotts Street Park, Ft.Pip Millett	2020	Dream Life Record	
"Make Me Cry - A COLORS Show"	Pip Millett	2019	COLORSxSTUDIOS	
"Try A Little Tenderness"	Pip Millett	2019	+ FOURS	Lester Duval
"On Your Mind"	Pip Millett	2018	+ FOURS	El Train
"Drunk & Alone"	Pip Millett	2018	+ FOURS	Abnormal Sleepz
"Talk About It"	Pip Millett	2018	+ FOURS	Luke Gomm
"Love The Things You Do"	Pip Millett	2018	+ FOURS	Lester Duval
"Make Me Cry"	Pip Millett	2018	+ FOURS	Lester Duval
