= DaVinChe =

- Origin: Lewisham, London, England
- Genres: Grime, R&B
- Occupations: Record producer, songwriter, musician

DaVinChe is a British record producer and songwriter from South London, England who is best known as one of the pioneer producers in the UK grime scene. His notable works include Kano's "Brown Eyes" and "P's and Q's", Mez Featuring Stormzy "Lex Luther", Giggs and Shola Ama "Blow Em' Away", Bashy featuring Wretch 32's "Male Pride", Tinie Tempah's "Tears", Tinchy Stryder's "Something About Your Smile", and a funky house hit collaboration with long time friends DJ Perempay and Katie Pearl "Something in the Air".

He is also responsible for many grime instrumentals including "Eyes on You", which was used in the Boy Better Know Cypher for SBTV's 100m Views Milestone celebration featuring JME, Jammer and Skepta.

Hailed as a "grime veteran" DaVinChe's stamp on the genre was indelible from the start, and he is commonly known as one of first to introduce tracks with singers to the genre, which until that point, had only heard a male dominated rap-esque sound. This style was later to be known as R'n’G (Rhythm and Grime). Also hailed as the 'R&G King' by Complex Mag, DaVinChe worked with Katie Pearl, and Sadie Ama, and Shola Ama to create the R&G sound.

DaVinChe spent his teens listening to mainstream pop-rock like the Beautiful South and Babybird, the R&B pop of TLC and R Kelly and the sounds of the urban underground. In 2009, he told The Guardian that he felt that grime is being threatened by "the whole hoodie perception" and that he wants to "make music without limits".

== Career ==
Although he began his career producing grime tracks, he has since turned his talents onto projects across various genres. There is a subtext to DaVinChe making him more difficult to pin down or stereotype. As well as being a self-taught engineer and producer, DaVinChe is also a pianist and guitarist, vocal producer and arranger, whose compositions are often influenced by other genres (indie, hip-hop, contemporary R’n’B and pop).

In 2006, DaVinChe teamed up with the BBC for the "Urban Classics" live event. Alongside jazz musician Jason Yarde and conductor Charles Hazlewood, he led a 36-piece BBC Concert Orchestra to create a 70-minute musical suite of grime, hip-hop and classical music.

Also in the same year, DaVinChe was the man behind the music for the NFL "Icons Campaign". The campaign, run by the American Football body and fronted by Trevor Nelson, aimed to introduce sport to a young UK audience.

In 2010, DaVinChe teamed up with Roll Deep, Aggro Santos, Bashy, Wretch 32, Bluey Robinson and Cleo Sol to create a charity single for Orange RockCorps. Using the name 'RockCorps Allstars', the UK acts performed the single at the Royal Albert Hall for the charity.

DaVinChe won the award for Best Producer at the 2011 Urban Music Awards. This same year, he released his first single as an artist, alongside female rapper, Baby Blue – the track was called "Ready To Go". He also produced and sang the hook for Bashy and Wretch 32's single "Male Pride", as well as, Gracious K's "Casio".

DaVinChe is also involved in artist development, signing them to his new production label, 'Dirty Canvas'. This became the home for Cleo Sol, as well four-piece girl group, IV ROX.

Having stayed behind the scenes for a few years, at the start of 2016, DaVinChe stepped back into the spotlight to release an array of his own projects. This included, "The VinchOnacci Project" – which was entirely made up of instrumentals; and then "VinchOnacci 2.0" which featured P Money, Dot Rotten, Scrufizzer and more. DaVinChe also wrote, directed and edited, the two feature length accompanying videos for the project, and professes to have taught himself the necessary skills using YouTube tutorials. The 'Hood Star' instrumental from '"The VinchOnacci project" was also used in a campaign for Dr Martens.

DaVinChe teamed up with Nottingham rapper, Mez, in 2016 to create "The M1 EP". This project featured Stormzy, AJ Tracey and Harvey (So Solid Crew).

This year DaVinChe has also had his tracks feature on P Money's latest album Live & Direct, as well as Boy Better Know star, Frisco's "System Killer"; and tracks with, Tinchy Stryder, JME, Mikill Pane and more.

On 20 January 2017, DaVinChe is set to release a collaborative album named #POWERS. The album features 32 artists from the UK. The entire album was created in just 14 days. Artists who feature on the album include; P Money, Scorcher, Ghetts, Big Tobz, Izzie Gibbs, Mikill Pane, Mercston, Baseman, Capo Lee, Jammz and many more.

== Discography ==
| Year | Title | Chart Positions | Album |
| Year | Title | UK Singles Chart | Album |
|---|---|---|---|
| 2004 | Kano – "P's and Q's" (Producer) | – | Home Sweet Home |
| 2004 | Kano – "Brown Eyes" (Producer) | – | Home Sweet Home |
| 2004 | Crazy Titch – "Worlds So Crazy" (Producer) | – | |
| 2005 | Sadie Ama – "Let Me Take You Away" (Writer, Producer) | – | |
| 2005 | Dirty Canvas the Legacy – Album (Producer) | – | |
| 2007 | Tinchy Stryder – "Breakaway (featuring Funda)" (Writer, Producer) | – | |
| 2007 | Tinchy Stryder – "Something About Your Smile (featuring Cyleena Cymone)" (Writer, Producer) | – | |
| 2007 | Street Politiks – "I'll RIDE" (featuring Cyleena Cymone)(Writer, Producer) | – | |
| 2007 | Street Politiks – "I'll RIDE. Remix. Ft. Estelle and Bashy" (Writer, Producer) | – | |
| 2007 | Tinie Tempah – "Tears feat. Cleo Sol" (Writer, Producer) | – | |
| 2007 | Tinchy Stryder – "Breathe" (Writer, Producer) | – | |
| 2008 | Kano – "Don't Come Around" (Producer) | – | 140 Grime St |
| 2008 | Kano – "I Like It" (Producer) | – | 140 Grime St |
| 2008 | Wiley – "Rider (Intro)" (Producer) | – | See Clear Now |
| 2009 | DaVinChe – "Rider feat Ghetts, Steelo, JME, Keedo" (Producer) | | |
| 2009 | DaVinChe – "Riding For Love feat Clea & Bashy" (Writer, Producer) | | |
| 2009 | Skepta, Cleo Sol – "Brothers Best Friend" (Unreleased) (Writer, Producer) | | |
| 2009 | DaVinChe – "Hero" feat Cleo Sol (Writer, Producer) | | |
| 2010 | DaVinChe – "Dancefloor" feat Wretch 32 & Cleo Sol (Writer, Producer) | | |
| 2010 | RockCorps All Stars (Roll Deep, Wretch 32, Aggro Santos) – "Give A Little Love" '(Writer, Producer/Performer) | | |
| 2011 | (Baby Blue, Cleo Sol,) – "Ready To Go" (Writer, Producer/Performer) | | |
| 2011 | DaVinChe, Sofie Sof – "JayZ Money" (Writer, Producer/Performer) | | |
| 2016 | DaVinChe – "The VinchOnacci Project Instrumental Album" (Producer) | | |
| 2016 | DaVinChe, Joe Grind, P-Money, Uncle Mez, Dot Rotten, Scrufizzer, Shizz McNaughty, Keedo, Olivia Louise – "VinchOnacci 2.0" Album (Producer) | | |
| 2016 | Uncle Mez, DaVinChe – "The M1 EP" (Writer, Producer) | | |
| 2016 | Frisco – System Killer Album "Murder She Wrote / Noise (ft Shakka)" (Writer, Producer) | | |
| 2016 | JME, Tinchy Stryder – "Allow Me" (Producer) | | |
| 2016 | P-Money – Live and Direct Album, "Conspiracy Don" (Producer) | | |
| 2017 | Various artists – "#POWERS," Album (Writer, Producer, Performer)* | | |
| 2019 | NAHLI - Therapy (Side A) EP - (Writer, Producer) | | |
