= Rebel with a Cause (album) =

Studio album by Ghetts
- Released: 10 March 2014
- Recorded: 2010–2014
- Genre: Grime; R&B; British hip hop
- Length: 61:39
- Label: Disrupt
- Producer: Ghetts (exec.); Astrixx; Chris Loco; Jason Moe; Let's Throw Shapes (also exec.); Nutty P; Rapid; Rawz Artilla; Scholar & Stix; Splurgeboys; The Confect

Ghetts chronology
Rebel with a Cause (2014)	Ghetto Gospel: The New Testament (2018)

Singles from Rebel with a Cause
- 1. "Rebel" Released: 4 February 2014; 2. "Rude Boy" Released: 24 May 2014; 3. "Gas Mark 9" Released: 11 August 2014; 4. "Fire Burning" Released: 30 November 2014

Rebel with a Cause is the debut album by Ghetts. It was released on 10 March 2014 through independent label Disrupt, following ten years' worth of mixtapes and singles. It entered the UK Albums Chart at number 23.

The album earned Ghetts numerous accolades; including 3 MOBO nominations, a BET nomination, the award for 'Hardest Working Artist' at the AIM Independent Awards and 2 Urban Music Awards for 'Best Album' and 'Best Male'. "Rebel with a Cause" also draws influences from other genres such as rock, jazz, and reggae.

== Singles ==
"Rebel" was released as a promotional single with a video accompaniment, available for download when you pre-ordered the album from 4 February 2014 onward. "Rude Boy" was released as the album's second single on 20 May 2014, gaining heavy airplay on BBC Radio 1Xtra. "Gas Mark 9" was released as the third single with a video accompaniment on 11 August 2014. Notably, the video version of the song is different to the album version, incorporating spoken word performance. "Fire Burning" was released on 30 November 2014 as the album's fourth single. The release also contains a remix of "Man Like Me" featuring new verses from Chip, Devlin, and Kano.

"Party Animal" (featuring Kano) was the only single that was not featured on the album (for unknown reasons); but had been released in 2013 shortly after "Definition of a Rebel" & "The Cypher" had been released.

== Track listing ==
No.	Title	Writer(s)	Producer(s)	Length
1.	"Intro"	Justin Clarke	Rawz Artllla; Let's Throw Shapes^{[b]}	4:16
2.	"Born & Raised"	Clarke	Astrixx; Let's Throw Shapes^{[b]}	3:08
3.	"Rude Boy"	Clarke	The Confect; Let's Throw Shapes^{[b]}	3:13
4.	"Rebel"	Clarke; Nick Amour; Gulzar Lally	Splurgeboys; Let's Throw Shapes^{[b]}	4:01
5.	"Gas Mark 9" (featuring Giggs)	Clarke; Nathaniel Thompson	Splurgeboys; Let's Throw Shapes^{[b]}	3:39
6.	"Buck-I"	Clarke	Astrixx	3:00
7.	"Man Like Me" (featuring Rapid)	Clarke; Prince Owusu-Agyekum	Rapid	3:09
8.	"Rags"	Clarke; Moe	Jason "Jaymoezart" Moe; Let's Throw Shapes^{[b]}	5:18
9.	"Ghetto No More" (featuring A.L.)	Clarke	Rapid	5:06
10.	"What I've Done" (featuring Cameron Bloomfield)	Clarke; Cameron Bloomfield; Scholar & Stix	Scholar & Stix	3:28
11.	"Times Change"	Clarke; Nick Amour	Anton "Nutty P" Flanders; Let's Throw Shapes^{[b]}	4:25
12.	"Fatherhood"	Clarke; Moe	Jason "Jaymoezart" Moe; Let's Throw Shapes^{[b]}	4:14
13.	"Broken Home" (featuring Folly Rae)	Clarke	Astrixx; Let's Throw Shapes^{[b]}	4:15
14.	"Fire Burning" (featuring Kof)	Clarke	Astrixx; Let's Throw Shapes^{[b]}	3:53
15.	"Pray"	Clarke; Amour; Lally	Let's Throw Shapes	4:37
16.	"These Words"	Clarke; Alex Mills	Chris Loco	4:18
17.	"Stand On" (featuring Yana)	Clarke; Yana	Scholar & Stix	3:46

Notes

- ^{^b} signifies an additional producer
- Let's Throw Shapes is Nick Amour and Gulzar Lally.

== Chart performance ==
Chart (2013)	Peak position
UK Albums (OCC)	23
UK Album Downloads (OCC)	18
UK Independent Albums (OCC)	6
UK R&B Albums (OCC)	5
