= Coming Home (K-Warren song) =

2000 single by K-Warren

Single by K-Warren featuring Lee-O
- Released: 23 April 2001
- Recorded: 2000
- Genre: UK garage
- Label: Go! Beat
- Songwriter(s): Kevin Williams, Leo Ihenacho
- Producer(s): Kevin Williams

K-Warren singles chronology
"When I Close My Eyes" (1999)	"Coming Home" (2001)	"Temptation" (2001)

"Coming Home" is a song by UK garage producer K-Warren featuring singer Lee-O on vocals. It was released as a single and reached the UK top 40 in April 2001, peaking at No. 32 on the UK Singles Chart. The song also reached No. 1 on the UK Dance Singles Chart.

== Track listing ==
UK 12"
A. "Coming Home" (K-Warren Remix) - 5:57
B1. "Coming Home" (Hackney Soldiers Remix) - 4:56
B2. "Coming Home" (Reach & Spin Remix) - 5:50

== Charts ==
Chart (2001)	Peak position
UK Singles (OCC)	32
UK Dance (OCC)	1
