= 140 Grime St =

Studio album by Kano
- Released: 29 September 2008
- Recorded: 2008
- Genre: Grime
- Length: 52:27
- Label: Bigger Picture Music
- Producer: Wiley; Mikey J; Skepta; DaVinChe

Kano chronology
London Town (2007)	140 Grime St (2008)	Method to the Maadness (2010)

Singles from 140 Grime St
- 1. "Hustler" Released: 21 September 2008

140 Grime St is the third studio album by British rapper Kano, released on 29 September 2008 by Bigger Picture Music. The album features guest appearances from Ghetts, Skepta, Wiley and Mikey J, with the latter three all contributing production.

== Background ==
The album came a year after Kano's second studio album, London Town, and after being dropped from 679 Recordings, a record label under Warner Music Group. Kano formed his own label imprint, Bigger Picture Music, deciding to return to a wholly grime approach for 140 Grime St. The album title is a reference to the tempo of grime production and is a continuation of the 'address' theme of his previous albums.

== Release and promotion ==
The first single was the track "Hustler", which Kano described as "the perfect single (as it explains so much)". Other songs from the CD include "Anywhere We Go", "I Like It" and the autobiographical "Aim for the Sky", in which Kano describes his rise to commercial prominence.

As of 2020, the album is unavailable to consume on digital streaming platforms or for purchase via digital download.

== Track listing ==
No.	Title	Writer(s)	Producer(s)	Length
1.	"140 Grime St"	Kane Robinson; Michael Asante	Mikey J	2:14
2.	"Hustler"	Robinson; Asante	Mikey J	4:51
3.	"Paper"	Robinson; Asante	Mikey J	5:13
4.	"Hunting We Will Go" (featuring Ghetts)	Robinson; Asante; Justin Clarke	Mikey J	4:31
5.	"These MC's" (featuring Skepta)	Robinson; Joseph Adenuga	Skepta	3:33
6.	"We Gangsta"	Robinson; Asante	Mikey J	4:11
7.	"Anywhere We Go" (featuring Wiley)	Robinson; Richard Cowie	Wiley	3:00
8.	"Missing Me"	Robinson; Asante	Mikey J	2:12
9.	"Seems Like Things Have Changed"	Robinson; Asante	Mikey J	1:54
10.	"Don't Come Around Here"	Robinson; Chadley Chichester	DaVinChe	4:41
11.	"I Stand by It"	Robinson; Asante	Mikey J	0:46
12.	"Soldier" (featuring Mikey J)	Robinson; Asante	Mikey J	3:46
13.	"I Like It"	Robinson; Asante	DaVinChe	2:45
14.	"Off Licence"	Robinson; Asante	Mikey J	3:14
15.	"Too Advanced"	Robinson; Asante	Mikey J	1:51
16.	"Aim for the Sky"	Robinson; Cowie	Wiley	3:45
Total length:				52:27

== Charts ==
Chart (2008)	Peak position
UK Independent Albums (OCC)	3
UK Albums (OCC)	48
