= Muzi (musician) =

- Birth name: Muziwakhe McVictor Mazibuko
- Born: 16 May 1991; Empangeni, Natal

Muziwakhe McVictor Mazibuko (born 16 May 1991), known professionally as Muzi, is a South African DJ, singer, songwriter, and record producer. Born and raised in Empangeni, KwaZulu-Natal, he rose to public prominence after releasing his second album, Afrovision (2018).

== Early life ==
Muziwakhe “Muzi” McVictor Mazibuko was born on 16 May 1991 in Ngwelezane, a township on the outskirts of Empangeni. Muzi is the youngest of five children in his family.

== Studio albums ==
Title	Album details
Boom Shaka	Released: 2 September 2016; Label: We.The.Bundu; Formats: Digital download, CD
Afrovision	Released: 11 May 2018; Label: We.The.Bundu; Formats: Digital download, CD
Zeno	Released: 11 October 2019; Label: We.The.Bundu; Formats: Digital download, CD
Interblaktic	Released: 1 October 2021; Label: We.The.Bundu; Formats: Digital download, CD
