= Hoodies All Summer =

Studio album by Kano
- Released: 30 August 2019
- Recorded: 2016–19
- Genre: British hip hop; grime
- Length: 39:16
- Label: Parlophone; Bigger Picture Music
- Producer: Blue May; Jodi Milliner; Hal Ritson

Kano chronology
Made in the Manor (2016)	Hoodies All Summer (2019)

Singles from Hoodies All Summer
- 1. "Trouble" Released: 19 July 2019; 2. "Class of Deja" Released: 19 July 2019

Hoodies All Summer is the sixth studio album by British rapper Kano. The album was released on 30 August 2019 by Parlophone Records and Bigger Picture Music. It follows the album Made in the Manor which was released in 2016. It includes guest appearances from Ghetts, D Double E, Popcaan, Kojo Funds and Lil Silva, with production handled by Blue May and Jodi Milliner.

== Promotion ==
The album was announced on 19 July 2019, alongside its cover art and track listing. Two singles were released on the same day: "Trouble" and "Class of Deja" featuring D Double E and Ghetts.

== Critical reception ==
Professional ratings
Aggregate scores
Source	Rating
AnyDecentMusic?	8.0/10
Metacritic	79/100
Review scores
Source	Rating
AllMusic	4/5 stars
Clash	9/10
The Daily Telegraph	5/5 stars
Exclaim!	9/10
Financial Times	4/5 stars
The Guardian	4/5 stars
Mojo	3/5 stars
NME	4/5 stars
The Observer	4/5 stars
Q	4/5 stars

Hoodies All Summer was met with critical acclaim upon its release. At Metacritic, which assigns a normalized rating out of 100 to reviews from music critics, the album has received an average score of 79, indicating "generally well received", based on 13 reviews.

Kitty Empire of The Observer stressed the album's "clarion-clear narratives about knife crime and the importance of good times", adding that these topics are "delivered not just with anger and pathos, but humour." William Rosebury of The Line of Best Fit concluded that Hoodies All Summer is "an exceptional achievement, proving once again that Kano is one of the UK’s most versatile, thoughtful and talented voices", while complimenting the stripped-back production that "consistently ensures that Kano’s voice is always front and centre."

Hoodies all Summer was also nominated for the 2020 Mercury Music Prize.

== Track listing ==
No.	Title	Writer(s)	Producer(s)	Length
1.	"Free Years Later"	Kane Robinson; Blue May; Jodi Milliner; Trevor Romeo; Paul Hale; Sade Adu	May; Hal Ritson; Milliner	3:52
2.	"Good Youtes Walk Amongst Evil"	Robinson; May; Milliner	May; Milliner	4:25
3.	"Trouble"	Robinson; May; Milliner; Alexander Burnett; Sam Beste	May; Milliner	5:02
4.	"Pan-Fried" (featuring Kojo Funds)	Robinson; May; Milliner; Errol Bellot	May; Milliner	3:30
5.	"Can't Hold We Down" (featuring Popcaan)	Robinson; May; Milliner; Cleveland Browne; Clifton Bailey; Wycliffe Johnson; Andrae Sutherland	May; Milliner	4:27
6.	"Teardrops"	Robinson; May; Milliner; Duke Reid; Migual Collins	May; Milliner	4:23
7.	"Bang Down Your Door"	Robinson; May; Milliner; Hindman	May; Milliner	1:32
8.	"Got My Brandy, Got My Beats" (featuring Lil Silva)	Robinson; May; Milliner; Napier	May; Milliner	3:46
9.	"Class of Deja" (featuring D Double E and Ghetts)	Robinson; May; Milliner; Darren Dixon; Justin Clarke	May; Milliner	3:29
10.	"SYM"	Robinson; May; Milliner; Malinga; Napier	May; Milliner	4:50
Total length:				39:16

== Personnel ==
Credits adapted from Tidal.

Musicians

- Kano – main artist, claps ("Trouble")
- Blue May – production (all tracks), synthesiser ("Free Years Later"), claps ("Trouble"), tambourine ("Trouble"), piano ("Bang Down Your Door")
- Jodi Milliner – production (all tracks), piano ("Can't Hold We Down", "Teardrops", "Got My Brandy, Got My Beats", "SYM"), bass ("Trouble", "Teardrops"), synthesiser ("Free Years Later", "Good Youtes Walk Amongst Evil", "Can't Hold We Down", "Got My Brandy, Got My Beats"), claps ("Trouble")
- Hal Ritson – production, violin ("Free Years Later")
- Louise Clare Marshall – vocals ("Free Years Later")
- Nerys Richards – cello ("Free Years Later")
- Sam Beste – piano ("Free Years Later", "Trouble")
- Marianne Haynes – violin ("Free Years Later")
- Amy Stanford – viola ("Trouble", "Teardrops")
- Gita Langley – violin ("Trouble", "Teardrops")
- Kotono Sato – violin ("Trouble", "Teardrops")
- Beverly Tawiah – choir vocals ("Trouble", "SYM")
- Emily Holligan – choir vocals ("Trouble", "SYM")
- Olivia Williams – choir vocals ("Trouble", "SYM")
- Vula Malinga – choir vocals ("Trouble", "SYM")
- Wilson Atie – choir vocals ("Trouble", "SYM")
- Valentina Pappalardo – backing vocals ("Got My Brandy, Got My Beats")

Technical

- Blue May – mixing (all tracks), programming ("Free Years Later", "Good Youtes Walk Amongst Evil", "Trouble", "Pan-Fried", "Can't Hold We Down", "Got My Brandy, Got My Beats", "Class of Deja"), synthesiser programming ("Good Youtes Walk Amongst Evil", "Bang Down Your Door", "Class of Deja")
- Jodi Milliner – programming ("Teardrops"), drum programming (all tracks except "Bang Down Your Door"), synthesiser programming ("Good Youtes Walk Amongst Evil", "Pan-Fried", "Class of Deja", "SYM")
- Amy Langley – arranging, cello ("Trouble", "Teardrops")
- Hal Ritson – programming ("Free Years Later")
- Matt Colton – mastering ("Free Years Later")
- Quays – drum programming ("Bang Down Your Door")
- Richard Adlam – programming ("Free Years Later")
- Scott Knapper – engineer (all tracks)

== Charts ==
Chart (2019)	Peak position
Scottish Albums (OCC)	40
UK Albums (OCC)	8
