= Home Sweet Home (Kano album) =

Studio album by Kano
- Released: 27 June 2005
- Recorded: 2002–04
- Length: 61:42
- Label: 679 Recordings
- Producer: Kano (also exec.); DaVinChe; Diplo; Fraser T Smith; Mike Skinner; Mikey J; Paul Epworth; Terror Danjah; TipC

Kano chronology
Home Sweet Home (2005)	London Town (2007)

Singles from Home Sweet Home
- 1. "P's and Q's" Released: November 2004; 2. "Typical Me" Released: 28 February 2005; 3. "Remember Me" Released: 13 June 2005; 4. "Nite Nite" Released: 26 June 2005; 5. "Brown Eyes" / "Signs in Life" Released: 6 March 2006

Home Sweet Home is the debut album by British rapper Kano. It was released on 27 June 2005 by 679 Recordings. Kano was 20 years old when the album was released. The album received highly positive reviews from music critics and peaked at number 36 on the UK Albums Chart. Six singles were released from the album— "P's and Q's", "Typical Me" featuring Ghetts, "Remember Me", "Nite Nite" featuring Leo the Lion & The Streets, "Brown Eyes" and "Signs in Life". Two of the singles, "Typical Me" and "Nite Nite", peaked within the top 30 of the UK Singles Chart.

== Critical reception ==
Professional ratings
Aggregate scores
Source	Rating
Metacritic	82/100
Review scores
Source	Rating
AllMusic	4/5 stars
RapReviews	9/10
Mojo	4/5 stars
NME	9/10
The Observer	5/5 stars
Pitchfork	8.4/10
Playlouder	4/5 stars
PopMatters	9/10
Q	3.5/5 stars
Stylus	B+

The album received widespread acclaim, At Metacritic, which assigns a normalized rating out of 100 to reviews from mainstream critics, the album received an average score of 82, based on 12 reviews, indicating "universal acclaim".

== Commercial performance ==
Home Sweet Home entered and peaked on the UK Albums Chart at number 36 on 3 July 2005. It is Kano's third highest-charting album of his career, after London Town (2007) and Made in the Manor (2016). Despite its relatively low peak, it is his highest-selling album, having reached Gold status in the UK, while the aforementioned two albums have thus far reached Silver status.

"Ps and Qs" was later certified Gold in May 2025, primarily driven by streaming and digital downloads, while "Nite Nite" was certified Silver in April of the same year.

== Track listing ==
No.	Title	Writer(s)	Producer(s)	Length
1.	"Home Sweet Home"	Kane Robinson; Michael Asante	Mikey J	3:37
2.	"Ghetto Kid" (featuring Ghetts)	Robinson; Justin Clarke; Fraser Thorneycroft-Smith	Fraser T Smith	3:04
3.	"P's and Q's"	Robinson; Chadley Chichester	DaVinChe	4:08
4.	"Reload It" (featuring Demon & D Double E)	Robinson; Wesley Pentz; Redhead; Darren Dixon; Dean Barrett; George Harrison	Diplo	3:47
5.	"Typical Me" (featuring Ghetts)	Robinson; Clarke; Smith	Fraser T Smith	4:34
6.	"Mic Check"	Robinson; Asante	Mikey J	3:11
7.	"Sometimes"	Robinson; Asante	Mikey J	3:35
8.	"9 to 5"	Robinson; Asante	Mikey J	2:10
9.	"Nite Nite" (featuring Leo the Lion & The Streets)	Robinson; Mike Skinner	Mike Skinner	4:45
10.	"Brown Eyes"	Robinson; Chichester	DaVinChe	3:49
11.	"Remember Me"	Robinson; Wellington; Bauza; Smith	TipC; Fraser T Smith	3:15
12.	"I Don't Know Why"	Robinson; Paul Epworth; Tony Iommi; Ozzy Osbourne; Geezer Butler; Bill Ward	Paul Epworth	3:56
13.	"How We Livin'"	Robinson; Rodney Price	Terror Danjah	3:48
14.	"Nobody Don't Dance No More"	Robinson; Smith	Fraser T Smith	3:52
15.	"Signs in Life"	Robinson; Smith	Fraser T Smith; Kano	6:09
16.	"Boys Love Girls" (bonus track)	Robinson	Kano	4:02
Total length:				61:42

Sample credits

- "I Don't Know Why" contains samples from "War Pigs" by Black Sabbath.
- "Reload It" contains samples from "I Dig Love" by Asha Puthli

== Personnel ==
Credits for Home Sweet Home adapted from Allmusic.

- Kano – primary artist, composer
- Dick Beetham – mastering
- Dan Stacey – A&R
- Ben Sansbury – Art direction, design
- Mike Skinner – producer, arranger, mixing
- Fraser T. Smith – producer, guitar, mixing
- Paul Epworth – producer, guitar
- Joe Fields – producer, mixing
- D Double E - featured artist
- Leo the Lion – primary artist
- Josh Garza – drums
- Leo Bubba Taylor – drums
- Beni G – scratching
- Simon Finch – trumpet
- James Moriarty – photography

== Charts ==
Chart (2005)	Peak position
UK Albums Chart	36

=== Certifications ===
Country/provider	Certification	Sales
United Kingdom (BPI)	Gold	100,000+
