= Ryan De La Cruz =

Congolese-British musician and actor (born 1996)

- Ryan De La Cruz in 2024

Background information
- Born: Rayan Itsan Indanda; 20 October 1996 (age 29); Cricklewood, Northwest London, England, United Kingdom
- Origin: Leytonstone, East London
- Genres: Grime; R&B; Afro-soul; trap; Congolese rumba; soukous; Afrobeats; hip-hop; funky house; jazz; world; pop
- Occupations: Singer; songwriter; rapper; producer; actor; model; television personality; director
- Instruments: Vocals, Rapping, Guitar, Drums, Piano
- Years active: 2013–present
- Labels: Sony Music; Void UK; Alacran Group LLO; J.0.A.l Records; ONErom; Raw-X Ent; Wèrè Wèrè Music; Def Jam Africa
- Website: film.ryandelacruz.co.uk

Rayan Itsan Indanda (born 20 October 1996), known professionally as Ryan De La Cruz, is a Congolese-British singer, songwriter, rapper, and actor. He sings in English, French, and Lingala. Born in Cricklewood, Northwest London, Itsan began recording music at the age of 11 and released a collaborative project with the Lil Rascals, a group associated with the early 2000s grime music movement. He later signed a record deal with Plan B in 2015 after portraying Jake in the film Ill Manors.

Ryan De La Cruz first gained attention as a rapper with the release of his five-track debut EP Pagans in June 2016. The following year, his track "Know About Me" gained recognition as Vevo's Track of the Week and entered BBC Radio 1's B list chart for several weeks. In 2019, Itsan released his debut studio album, Syko, followed by 23 (2021). In 2024, he released the four-track EP Cameleon on 23 February, Nasti on 16 August, and a joint EP with Sh Quille, How You Getting On, on 29 November.

== Early life ==
Ryan De La Cruz was born Rayan Itsan Indanda on 20 October 1996 in Cricklewood, Northwest London, to Congolese parents. His father, Rev. Dave Indanda, was a reverend and one of the early members of the Congolese nationalist movement known as the Combattants. His mother, Marie-Claire Tumbe, worked as a model and tailor.

De La Cruz developed a strong interest in music and performing from an early age and had taught himself to sing and dance by the age of seven. He often used kitchen utensils as makeshift drums while practicing rhythms in his bedroom. Seeing his son's interest in music, his father taught Ryan and his two sisters how to sing in harmony. Growing up with five siblings, he was active in church, where he attended services regularly, sang in the choir with his father and other members of the congregation, and later became the church's drummer after taking drum lessons with his father on Saturdays.

In the early 2000s, his family relocated to Forest Gate, East London, where he developed an interest in acting. He regularly helped his older sister, Julia, rehearse for her drama classes, which introduced him to theater. She later took him to her school to watch a drama rehearsal, where he met Nick Sagar for the first time. The two would later work together in the film Ill Manors.

== Music career ==
=== 2000s–2017: Lil Rascals, Pagans, "Know About Me", and Syko ===
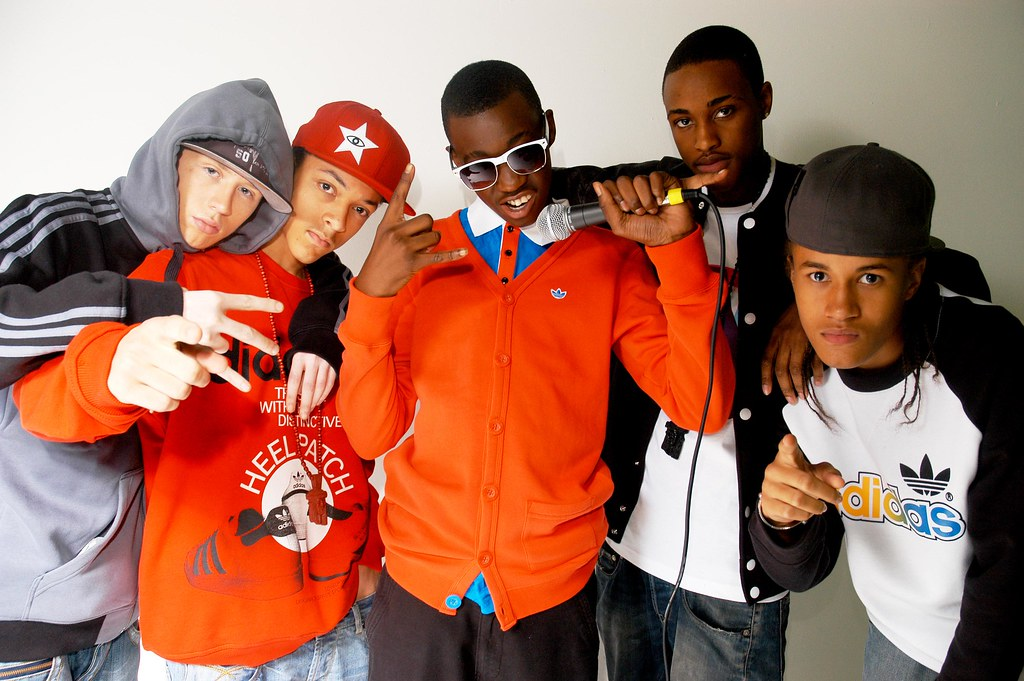
De La Cruz and Lil Rascals in a 2014 Adidas photoshoot.

After moving to East London, De La Cruz began taking part in school talent shows and building connections in the local music scene. He became friends with a classmate whose father managed Lil Rascals, a well-known group in the UK grime scene that regularly appeared on Channel AKA. At just nine years old, De La Cruz was already determined to become a musician and regularly asked his friend to introduce him to their parents.

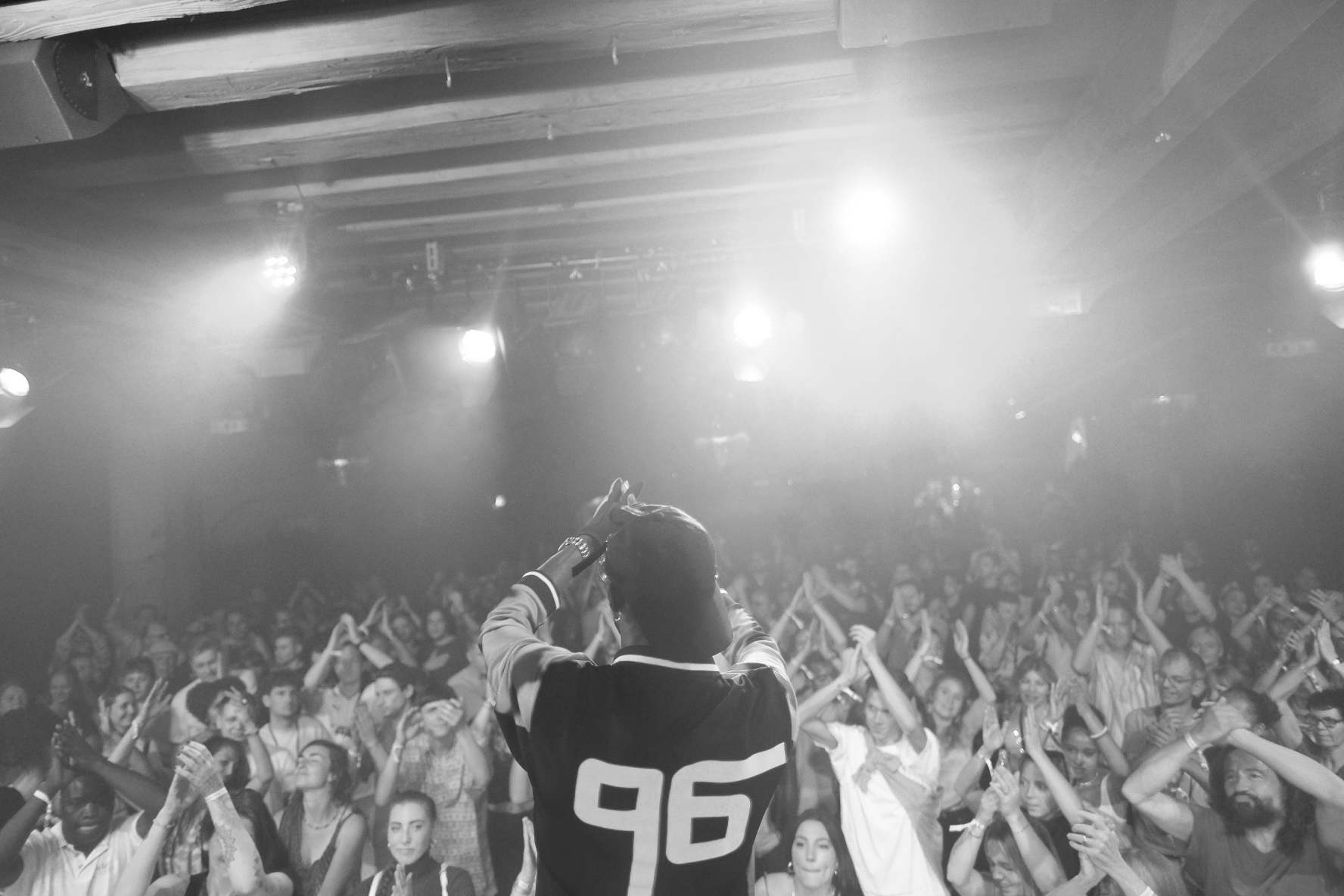
De La Cruz performing live at Afro-Pfingsten, a festival held in Winterthur, Switzerland

While filming Ill Manors, De La Cruz became close friends with Plan B, who later became his mentor. Plan B helped him improve his songwriting and music production skills. In 2013, he signed a record deal with Plan B's recording imprint under Sony Music. De La Cruz released his first five-track EP, Pagans, in June 2016, which included the songs "Gotham", "Don't Think About It", "Bando", "Pagans", and "Jimmy's Story". Earlier that year, on 1 May 2016, he appeared on NSG's single "Alright", which was later featured on the band's 2017 EP Grown Up.

In January 2017, the music video for his song "Know About Me", directed by Bouha Kazmi, gained significant recognition and landed the song on the BBC Radio 1 B list chart for several weeks. The track, which had been released by Void UK in October 2016, was chosen as Vevo's Track of the Week and was named Best Video of the Year by BBC Radio 1Xtra hosts MistaJam, DJ Semtex, and DJ Target. In an interview with The Hundreds, De La Cruz said he wanted the project to be "vibrant" and show different sides of his music and creativity. On 7 March 2019, he guest-performed on S Wavey's single "Player" alongside Ghetts. Later that year, on 8 November, he released his debut studio album, Syko, under Alacran Group LLO/J.0.A.l Records, licensed exclusively to ONErom. He produced and mixed much of the 11-track album, which blended trap with contemporary R&B and included guest appearances by Mercston and JiuLing. The title track, "Syko", became popular for mixing melodic sounds with hard-hitting trap beats, characterized by what De La Cruz described as "creepy nursery bells" that added an eerie edge. The lo-fi and gritty visuals of the "Stubborn" music video drew attention to his dance and performance.

De La Cruz in Lagos

=== 2021–present: 23, Cameleon, Nasti, How You Getting On, and "Oyo Nini" ===
In 2021, De La Cruz released his second studio album, 23, a self-produced project featuring 23 tracks. Inspired by contemporary R&B and soul, the album explored social issues such as abortion, discrimination, racism, and police brutality. It featured guest appearances from Luke Gomm, Ngozi Diamond, Gabi'el, JiBs, Apollo BlockBoy, Dennis Milliano, Krze, Jacksmunii, Smasher, BackRoad Gee, Clinton Elvis, Lavelle London, Richy Sparkz, Rolldens, FUNDR, Nxm Notes, Neezy N.E.B, ADP, and Tokyo James.

In 2023, he appeared on XVR BLCK's EP The BLCKOut (EP) Vol. 1, featuring on the song "Pembeni". The next year, he released three EPs: Cameleon on 23 February, Nasti on 16 August, and How You Getting On, a collaborative project with Sh Quille, on 29 November. On 21 February 2025, De La Cruz released "Oyo Nini", a Congolese rumba-inspired single that sampled Franco Luambo's 1984 song "Makambo Ezali Bourreau". The track was released through Raw-X Ent and Wèrè Wèrè Music and distributed by Def Jam Africa.

== Acting ==
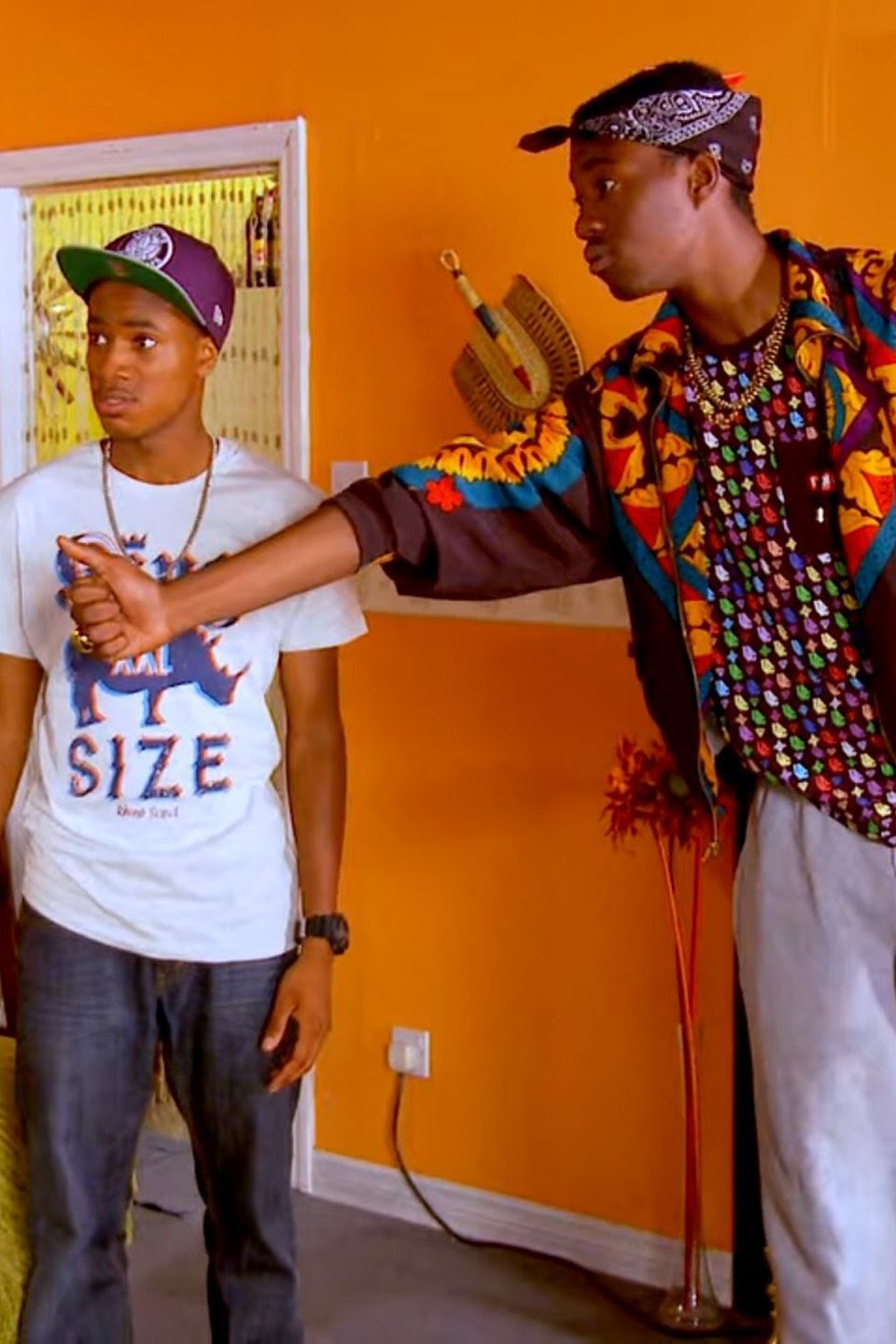
De La Cruz in a scene from Meet the Adebanjos, Series 2, Episode 14.

After grabbing the attention of Plan B, De La Cruz was auditioned in school to play a lead role in a film that Plan B both wrote and self-directed Ill Manors. Charles Gant of Variety wrote, "young De La Cruz impresses when he switches from macho swagger to scared child in a heartbeat". This gave De La Cruz depth in terms of experience and allowed him to grow. After he received the role of Jake, De La Cruz went on and landed a role 'Shawn' in the British-African sitcom Meet the Adebanjos, appearing in Series 2, Episode 14 ("Rude Boy Friend") on Netflix alongside Wale Ojo, Daniel Davids, Yetunde Oduwole which he co-directed and it, later on, became an ultimate fan favorite.

De La Cruz was featured in the MTV show Judge Geordie Season 1, in which he expressed the problems and altercations he faced with his best mates. The episode featuring his friends Waffle King & Xvr Blck was initially a prank pulled by the bunch, but Vicky Pattison was totally unaware.

== Discography ==
=== Studio albums ===
- Syko (2019)
- 23 (2021)

=== EP ===
- Pagans (2016)
- Phase 1: Know About Me EP (2017)
- Phase 2: Belly EP (2018)
- Cameleon (2024)
- Nasti (2024)

=== Joint EP ===
- How You Getting On with Sh Quille (2024)
