= K-Warren =

British artist and producer

Kevin Warren Williams (born 1974), known as K-Warren, is a UK garage producer. He is a former member of the group Architechs, known for their UK garage remix of Brandy and Monica's "The Boy Is Mine" (1998). K-Warren's best-known releases are "Coming Home", Richie Dan's "Call It Fate" (as producer) and his mix of Ed Case's "Something in Your Eyes". All three songs were top 40 hits on the UK Singles Chart, peaking at numbers 32, 34 and 38 respectively, with "Coming Home" also reaching number one on the UK Dance Singles Chart.
