= Made in the Manor =

Studio album by Kano
- Released: 4 March 2016
- Recorded: 2013–15
- Genres: British hip hop; grime
- Length: 62:18
- Labels: Parlophone; Bigger Picture Music
- Producers: Blue May; Damon Albarn; Fraser T Smith; Jme; Jodi Milliner; Kano; Kwes; Mele; Mikey J; Rustie; Sam Beste; Swifta Beater; Zeph Ellis

Kano chronology
Method to the Maadness (2010)	Made in the Manor (2016)	Hoodies All Summer (2019)

Singles from Made in the Manor
- 1. "Hail" Released: 12 April 2015; 2. "3 Wheel-Ups" Released: 8 January 2016

Made in the Manor is the fifth studio album by English rapper Kano. The album was released on 4 March 2016 by Parlophone Records and Bigger Picture Music. It is Kano's first album release for six years following Method to the Maadness (2010), featuring guest appearances from Wiley, Giggs, Jme and Damon Albarn. The production was handled by frequent collaborators Mikey J, Fraser T Smith, Blue May and Damon Albarn, alongside Jodi Milliner, Kwes, Mele, Rustie, Sam Beste, Swifta Beater and Zeph Ellis.

The album received positive reviews from critics and entered the UK Albums Chart at number 8, becoming Kano's highest-charting album in his career. It was shortlisted for the Mercury Prize in 2016. It also won 'Best Album' in the 2016 MOBO Awards.

== Critical reception ==
Professional ratings
Aggregate scores
Source	Rating
AnyDecentMusic?	6.9/10
Metacritic	66/100
Review scores
Source	Rating
Clash	7/10
Evening Standard	4/5 stars
The Guardian	3/5 stars
The Line of Best Fit	8/10
Mojo	4/5 stars
PopMatters	5/10
Q	3/5 stars
Uncut	7/10
Vice	A−

Made in the Manor was met with positive reviews upon its release. At Metacritic, which assigns a normalized rating out of 100 to reviews from music critics, the album has received an average score of 66, indicating "generally favorable reviews", based on nine reviews.

=== Accolades ===
Publication	Accolade	Year	Rank	Ref.
The Guardian	The Best Albums of 2016	2016	31	
The Independent	Best Albums of 2016	2016	8	
NME	NME's Albums of the Year 2016	2016	15	

== Track listing ==
No.	Title	Writer(s)	Producer(s)	Length
1.	"Hail"	Kane Robinson	Rustie; Fraser T Smith^{[a]}	3:31
2.	"T-Shirt Weather in the Manor"	Robinson; Smith	Smith	5:16
3.	"New Banger"	Robinson; Melé	Mele; Smith^{[a]}	4:50
4.	"3 Wheel-Ups" (featuring Wiley and Giggs)	Robinson; Richard Cowie; Nathaniel Thompson	Swifta Beater	4:38
5.	"This Is England"	Robinson	Blue May; Jodi Milliner^{[a]}	3:38
6.	"Little Sis"	Robinson; Smith	Smith	3:25
7.	"A Roadman's Hymn"	Robinson	Mikey J; Blue May^{[a]}; Milliner^{[a]}	4:30
8.	"Drinking in the West End"	Robinson; Smith	Smith	3:48
9.	"Deep Blues" (featuring Damon Albarn)	Robinson; Smith; Damon Albarn	Smith; Damon Albarn	3:07
10.	"Endz"	Robinson	Mikey J	3:58
11.	"Strangers"	Robinson; Sam Beste; Jodi Milliner	Blue May; Milliner; Kano; Sam Beste^{[a]}	3:36
12.	"Seashells in the East"	Robinson; Smith	Smith	3:27
13.	"My Sound"	Robinson	Blue May; Kwes^{[a]}; Milliner^{[a]}	6:17

Made in the Manor – Bonus tracks
No.	Title	Writer(s)	Producer(s)	Length
14.	"GarageSkankFreestyle"	Robinson	Zeph Ellis	4:43
15.	"Flow of the Year" (featuring Jme)	Robinson; Jamie Adenuga	Jme	3:34
Total length:				62:18

Notes

- ^{^[a]} signifies an additional producer

Sample credits

- "Hail" contains a sample of "Next Hype", written and performed by Tempa T.

== Personnel ==
- Kano – vocals, drum programming (6, 9), producer (6, 11, 13), bass (2)
- Fraser T. Smith – guitar (1), additional producer (1, 2), drums (2, 12), keyboards (6, 8, 9), piano (2, 6, 8, 9, 12), drum programming (6, 8, 9, 12), producer (2, 6, 8, 9, 11, 12), bass (2, 12), Synthesizer (2)
- Michael Asante – programming (1), producer (7, 10)
- Rustie – producer (1)
- Melé – producer (3)
- Deanna Wilhelm – horn (6, 12)
- Nubya Garcia – horn (6, 12)
- Rosie Turton – horn (12)
- Blue May – keyboards (5, 7, 11, 13), programming (5, 7, 11, 13), additional producer (4, 7), electric guitar (13), drums (13)
- Amy Langley – cello (5, 7), orchestra (7)
- Amy Stanford – viola (5, 7)
- Gita Langley – violin (5, 7)
- Rosie Langley – violin (5, 7)
- Dirty pretty strings – string quartett (7)
- Jodi Milliner – keyboards (5, 7, 11, 13), programming (5, 7, 11, 13), additional producer (5, 7, 13), producer (11), bass (5, 11)
- Tawiah – backing vocals (8, 11)
- Vula Malinga – backing vocals (8, 11)
- Damon Albarn – keyboards (9), vocals (9)
- Tom Skinner – drums (5, 11)
- Sam Beste – piano (5, 11), vocoder (11), producer (11)
- Kwes – bass (13), keyboards, (13), additional producer (13)
- Zeph Ellis – producer (14)
- Jme – producer (15), vocals (15)
- James Adams – trumpet (5)
- Ryan Jacobs – trumpet (5)
- the killer horns – horns (5)
- Simon Elms – trumpet (4)
- Colin Smith – saxophone (4)
- Seifta Beater – producer (4)
- Giggs – vocals (4)
- Wiley – vocals (4)

== Charts ==
Chart (2016)	Peak position
UK Albums (Official Charts)	8
UK Album Downloads (Official Charts)	3
UK R&B Albums (Official Charts)	1

== Certifications ==
Region	Certification	Certified units/sales
United Kingdom (BPI)	Gold	100,000^{‡}
^{‡} Sales+streaming figures based on certification alone.

== Release history ==
Region	Date	Format	Label
United Kingdom	4 March 2016	CD; digital download	Parlophone
