= Leo the Lion (singer) =

Leo Ihenacho
- Born: Leo Ihenacho; 28 May 1977 (age 49); London, England
- Occupations: Singer, songwriter
- Years active: 2000–present

Leo Ihenacho // (born 28 May 1977), also known as Leo the Lion and Lee-O, is a Nigerian British singer, songwriter and actor who collaborated several times with the Streets.

== Music ==
In 2001, Ihenacho was the featured vocalist on the UK top 40 and number one dance hit "Coming Home" by UK garage producer K-Warren.

Ihenacho is also the lead vocal performance behind the song "Lock Down", produced by Adam Skinner and Dave James of British production music company Audio Network.

The song has been frequently used as a licensed track for intermissions on livestreams from the video game journalism website Giant Bomb, where it has gained popularity as an Internet meme. During the COVID-19 pandemic in 2020, the song was referenced in the title and description of a series made after the editorial staff began streaming from their homes while under government lockdown.

== Television ==
He has also appeared in several TV reality shows; in 2006, he appeared as a member of "the Celebrity squad" in The Match and then in dating show Love Island. He also competed in the 2014 season of TV reality show The Voice UK. Ihenacho appeared in season 2 of Locked Up Abroad: Breakout in the third episode "Dominican Drug Bust", as the actor portraying Andre.
