= Fraser T. Smith =

English record producer and musician (born 1971)

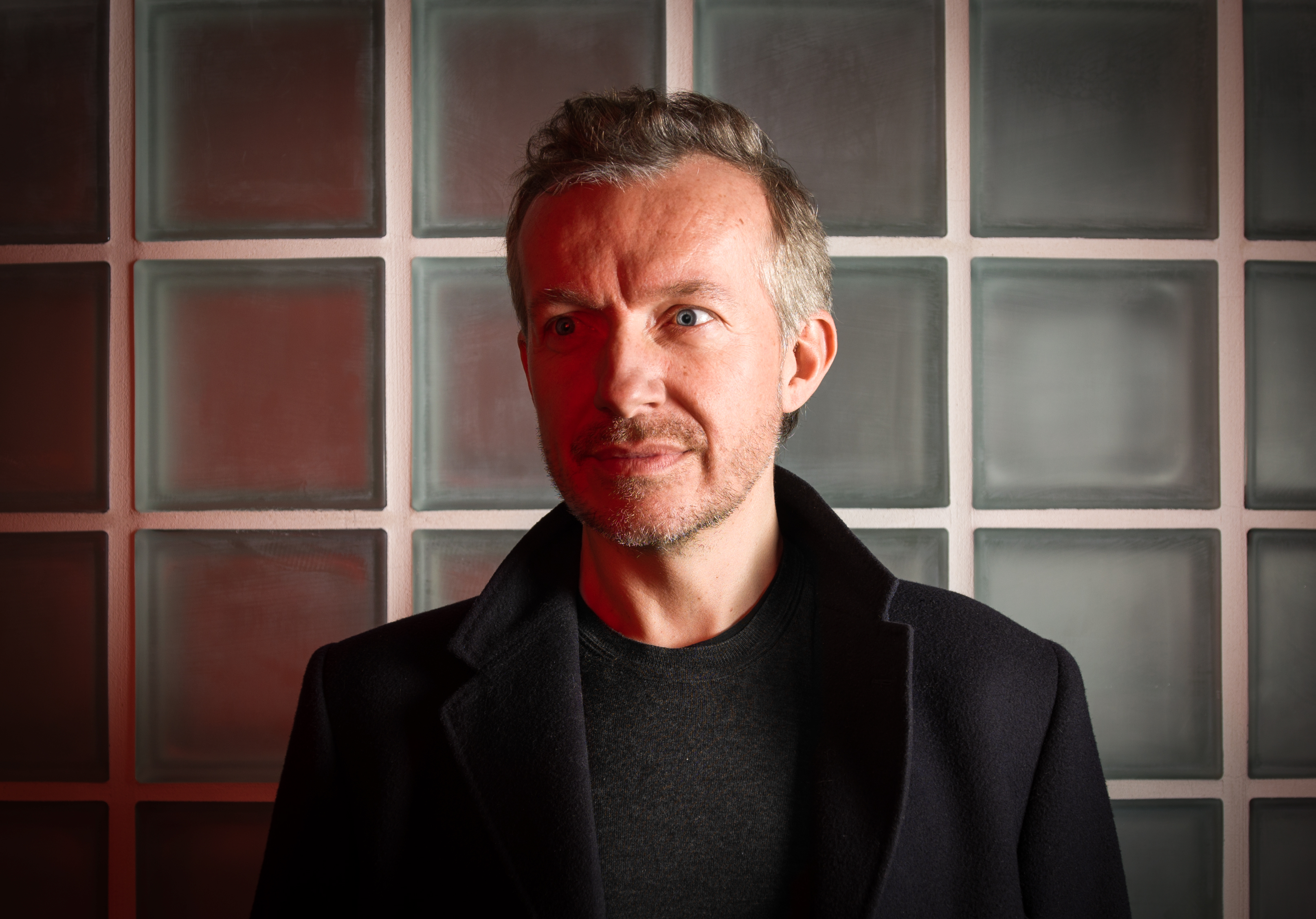
- Smith in March 2018

Background information
- Also known as: Future Utopia
- Born: Fraser Thorneycroft-Smith; 8 February 1971 (age 55); Buckinghamshire, England
- Genres: Grime; pop; hip hop; indie rock; progressive rock
- Occupations: Record producer; songwriter; musician
- Instruments: Guitar; bass; drums; keyboards
- Years active: 1995–present
- Labels: 70Hz; My Audiotonic
- Website: frasertsmith.com

Fraser Thorneycroft-Smith (born 8 February 1971), known professionally as Fraser T. Smith, is an English record producer, songwriter and musician. Some of the singles he collaborated on include Adele's "Set Fire to the Rain", James Morrison's "Broken Strings", Tinchy Stryder's "Number 1" and Taio Cruz's "Break Your Heart". In 2016, Smith teamed up with Stormzy to produce his debut album Gang Signs & Prayer, which won Best Album at the 2018 Brit Awards. Earlier that year he produced seven tracks on Kano's Made in the Manor album and co-produced the debut EP from South London rapper Dave. Smith has also worked with Sam Smith.

Smith released his debut album, 12 Questions, on 30 October 2020. The record is based on a series of 12 questions all born of Smith’s own anxieties about the world, discussing issues such as faith, freedom, race, gender, wealth, equality and ecology. Smith collaborated with Dave, Kano, Ghetts, Bastille, Idris Elba and Stormzy.

On 18 March 2021, Smith was presented with a RSL (Rockschool Ltd) Fellowship. In August 2021, Dave and Smith were nominated for the Ivor Novello Awards 2021 in the Best Contemporary Song category for "Children of the Internet". Dave and Smith subsequently won. This was their third Ivor Novello win in four years. The song is performed by Future Utopia. This was producer Smith’s new project and features Dave and Es Devlin.

== Career ==
Smith started his career playing guitar in pubs and clubs both as a solo musician and in bands. In 1992, Smith met Rick Wakeman with whom he toured and recorded. Smith then went on to work with Tony Hadley and Rick's son Adam Wakeman. In the mid-1990s, they formed Jeronimo Road, a progressive rock band. Smith then became involved in playing guitar in studio sessions, performing on over 200 records, including Rui da Silva's number one "Touch Me" and Tim Deluxe's "It Just Won't Do".

In 1999, Smith was introduced to the then-unknown Craig David and spent five years working as his guitarist performing on television and radio, as well as at concerts including the John Lennon Tribute Concert at Radio City Hall in New York, the Tsunami Relief Cardiff at the Millennium Stadium in Cardiff, and Live 8, London. They remixed songs together under the pseudonym of Treats and have written the songs "World Filled With Love", "6 of 1 Thing", and "Hot Stuff".

In 2011, Smith won a Grammy Award for his work with Adele.

In 2012, Smith was nominated for an Ivor Novello Award for his writing on "Broken Strings". In 2015, Smith was nominated for Album of the Year in the 57th Grammy Awards for his contribution to Sam Smith's album In the Lonely Hour.

Between 2013 and 2016, Smith worked with longtime collaborator Kano on his album Made in the Manor, which was subsequently shortlisted for the 2016 Mercury Prize and nominated for Album of the Year at the 2017 Brit Awards. It went on to win Best Album at the MOBO Awards.

Smith also collaborated with Mexican duo Jesse & Joy on their album Un Besito Más, which was released in December 2015. At the 17th Annual Latin Grammy Awards, the album received the nomination for Album of the Year and won for Best Contemporary Pop Vocal Album.

In 2016, Smith was approached by grime and hip hop artist Stormzy. They spent ten months writing and producing his debut album, Gang Signs & Prayer, released independently through #Merky Records on 24 February 2017. The album was supported by the lead single "Big for Your Boots".

During the COVID-19 pandemic, Smith produced the Live Lounge Allstars' charity version of the Foo Fighters' "Times Like These", featuring twenty-four musicians recorded from their homes.

In 2018, Smith and the rapper Dave won an Ivor Novello Award for the track "Question Time". In 2020, they won an Ivor Novello Award for the track "Black".

== Discography ==
=== Studio album ===
Details
Title	Album details
12 Questions	Released: 30 October 2020; Label: Future Utopia; Formats: CD, LP, streaming, digital download

=== Selected production and songwriting credits ===
Year	Artist	Title	Type	Peak chart position
2018	Tom Grennan	Lighting Matches	Album (track "Sober")	UK #5
2018	Calum Scott	Only Human	Album (7 tracks inc. "You are The Reason")	UK #4; US #66
2018	Ramz	"Family Tree"	Single	UK #35
2019	Anne-Marie	Speak Your Mind	Album (track "You Are The Reason")	UK #3; US #31
2019	Dave feat. Fredo	"Funky Friday"	Single	UK #1
2019	Dave	Psychodrama	Album (6 tracks)	UK #1
2019	Tiesto, Jonas Blue & Rita Ora	"Ritual"	Single	US Hot Dance #13; UK #24
2019	Stormzy	Heavy is the Head	Album (4 tracks)	UK #1
2020	Raye	Euphoric Sad Songs	Mini-album (track "Please Don't Touch")	
2020	Live Lounge Allstars	"Times Like These" (cover)	Single ("Live Lounge Allstars charity single")	UK #5
2021	Mysie	Undertones	EP	
2021	Easy Life	Life's A Beach	Album (2 tracks including "Nightmares")	UK #2
2021	Kasabian	"Alygatyr"	Single	

== Awards and nominations ==
Award show	Year	Category	Work	Result	Ref(s)
Grammy Awards	2012	Album of the Year	21 (Adele)	Won	
Grammy Awards	2015	Album of the Year	In the Lonely Hour (Sam Smith)	Nominated	
Ivor Novello Awards	2018	Track of the Year	"Question Time" (Dave)	Won	
Ivor Novello Awards	2020	Track of the Year	"Black" (Dave)	Won	
Ivor Novello Awards	2021	Best Contemporary Song	"Children of the Internet"	Won	
Music Producers Guild Awards	2023	Outstanding Contribution to UK Music	Fraser T. Smith	Won	
BMI London Awards	2025	BMI President's Award	Fraser T. Smith	Won	
Ivor Novello Awards	2026	Best Contemporary Song	"I Stand on the Line" (with Kae Tempest)	Won	
Ivor Novello Awards	2026	Best Contemporary Song	"Know Yourself" (with Kae Tempest and Tom Rowlands)	Nominated	
