= Ghetts =

British rapper (born 1984)

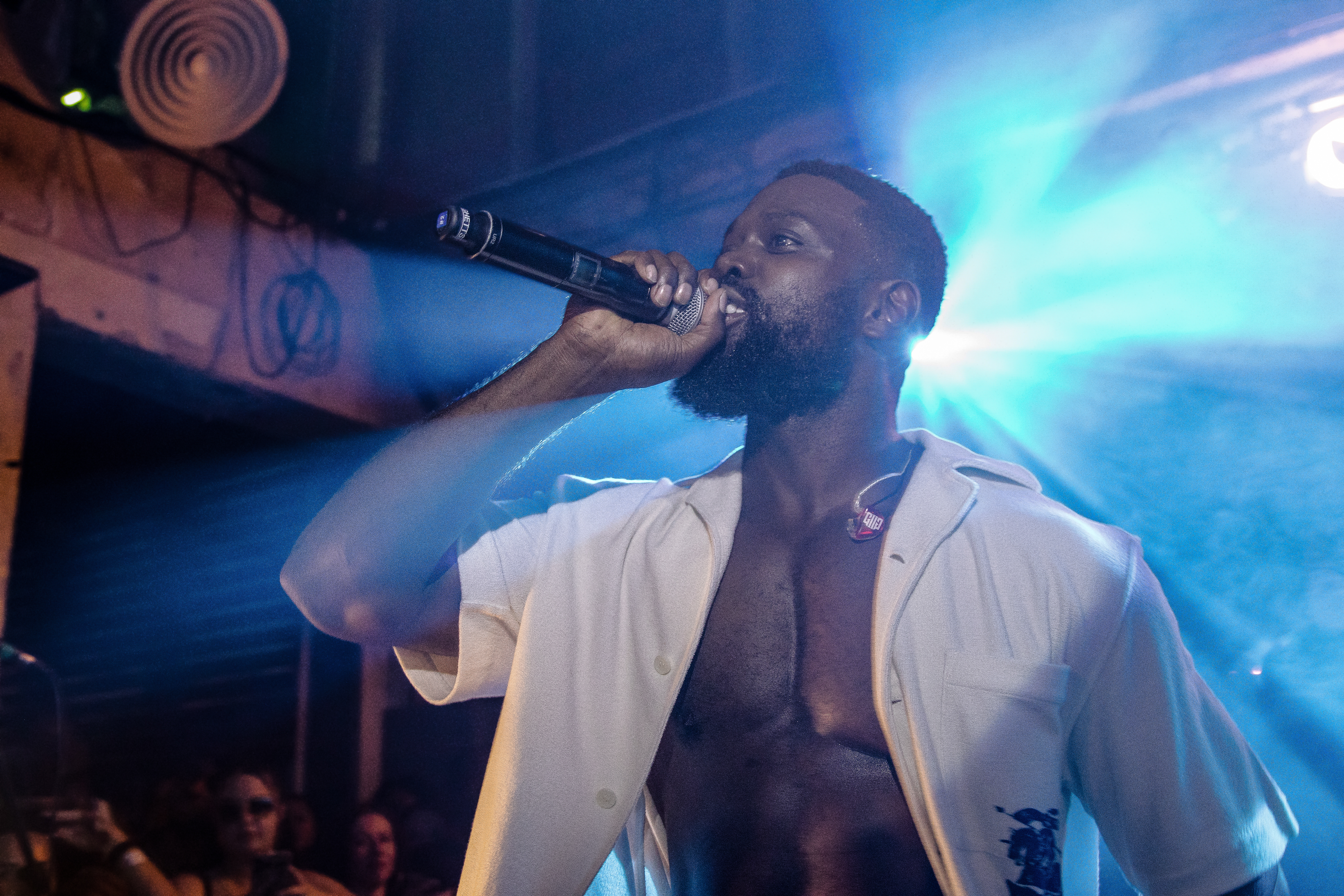
- Ghetts in February 2021

Background information
- Also known as: Ghetto; Reggie
- Born: Justin Jude Clarke-Samuel; 9 October 1984 (age 42); Plaistow, London, England
- Genres: British hip-hop; grime
- Occupations: Rapper; songwriter
- Years active: 2003–2025
- Labels: GIIG; Disrupt
- Formerly of: Dancehall Mafia; Nasty Crew; The Movement
- Criminal information
- Status: incarcerated
- Convictions: dangerous driving and causing death by dangerous driving
- Penalty: 12 years imprisonment

Details
- Killed: Yubin Tamang
- Date apprehended: October 19, 2025
- Imprisoned at: HM Prison Pentonville, London

Justin Jude Clarke-Samuel (born 9 October 1984), better known by his stage name Ghetts (formerly Ghetto), is an English grime MC and rapper. He released his debut studio album, Rebel with a Cause, via independent record label Disrupt on 9 March 2014. Known for his hard hitting lyrics and intricate rhyme schemes, he is associated and has toured internationally with such acts as Kano and was a member of N.A.S.T.Y. Crew.

In 2021 he won the Best Male Act at the Mobo Awards and in 2024 received the Mobo Pioneer award for his "significant contribution to British black culture".

Ghetts was charged with causing death by dangerous driving following a hit-and-run in Ilford, London in October 2025, and pleaded guilty on 8 December 2025. On 3 March 2026, he was sentenced to 12 years in prison.

== Musical career ==
Ghetts was a member of grime collective N.A.S.T.Y. Crew, however he left, saying that things had gone "pear-shaped". He later went on to create the grime collective The Movement, including Devlin, Wretch 32, Scorcher, Mercston, Lightning, and DJ Unique. Ghetts has made a number of well-known songs within the UK grime scene. In 2008, Ghetts was nominated for a BET Award for Best International Act: UK along with Chipmunk, Giggs, and Skepta. In the end, Giggs took the award home.

In October 2020, Ghetts collaborated with Fraser T. Smith in the production of Smith's debut album "12 Questions".

=== 2003–2005: Breakthrough, Nasty Crew and 2000 & Life ===
Clarke-Samuel attended St Bonaventure's school in Forest Gate, where he befriended fellow musicians including Stormin. Prosecuted for car crimes in his late teens, he was sent to HM Prison Huntercombe, a young offender institution, where he began writing rap lyrics. He was released on 4 August 2003, and joined the short-lived grime crew Dancehall Mafia alongside fellow MCs Stanaman and Rage. Initially, he adopted the artist name Freedom; however, he got the nickname Ghetto from friends, which was further popularised by its usage on Stormin's song "Day By Day" and led him to use the name professionally. His first recorded song was "Mind Works" with Dancehall Mafia, produced by Jammer, which appeared on the 2004 Lord of the Decks Vol. 2 compilation album.

Around this time, Clarke-Samuel formally joined the popular grime collective Nasty Crew on the recommendation of founding members Stormin and Sharky Major, appearing on the group's 2005 single "Nasty Bonanza" as well as their pirate radio and rave appearances. He released his first solo project, the 24-track mixtape 2000 & Life, in 2005, to critical acclaim from specialist media. He also featured twice on Nasty Crew colleague Kano's debut album Home Sweet Home, released via 679 Recordings, including on the single "Typical Me"; during the album's release campaign, he accompanied Kano on tour with Mike Skinner.

=== 2007: Ghetto Gospel ===
In 2007, Ghetto released his second pre-album mixtape Ghetto Gospel. The mixtape was a departure from his previous release, 2000 & Life, being more mellow and featuring tracks about his female relationships: girlfriends, sister, and mother. In interviews, he has stated that the mixtape's calmer tone is to "prove people wrong", as he does not want to be typecast as an aggressive and angry rapper.

Ghetto Gospel was considered Ghetts' breakthrough of that year and era, with "Top 3 Selected" becoming an underground hit in its own right. He personally names this mixtape as his best body of work in many interviews.

The album is titled Ghetto Gospel to demonstrate that Ghetts has put his soul into creating it.

On 27 October 2007, Ghetts performed with Kano at the BBC Electric Proms, performing alongside a violinist.

Though Ghetto Gospel was marketed as a mixtape at the time of its release, Ghetts stated in a Link Up TV interview that in hindsight he considered it his first studio album. He went on to explain that, during the recording of Ghetto Gospel, he was unsure whether to call it a full LP due to industry influences and a lack of resources.

=== 2008–11: Freedom of Speech and All Around the World record deal ===
On 10 March 2008, Ghetto released Freedom of Speech. It was produced exclusively by Lewi White and Smasher (the pair responsible for "Back in Da Day"). Some of its songs were subliminal diss tracks for members of Boy Better Know. It includes collaborations with Smasher, Griminal, Brutal, Chipmunk, and Devlin. Ghetto stated that the mixtape is more akin to 2000 & Life than Ghetto Gospel.

In 2009, Ghetts signed with dance music label All Around the World, a partner of Universal Music Group. He released the electronic dance music single "Sing 4 Me" with them, and it was announced that he would be releasing an album, Rebel with a Cause, through the label in November 2009. However, the album was ultimately shelved for several years as he parted ways with the label.

=== 2010–13: The Calm Before the Storm and non-album projects ===
On 12 July 2010, Ghetto, under the new alias Ghetts, released his fourth mixtape The Calm Before the Storm. Production was provided by the likes of Z Dot, Rude Kid, Nocturnal, Londoners Griminal, Devlin, and Maxsta, among others. On 13 March, Ghetts won an OMA (Official Mixtape Award) for his mixtape, The Calm Before The Storm. He is also featured on the song "On A Mission" with Dot Rotten and Opium on Mumzy Stranger's mixtape No Stranger To This.

On 21 February 2011, Grime Daily uploaded the official video of a song titled "Who's on the Panel". The song is directed at the MTV Base panel who presented the "Best of the Best: UK MCs 2010" show on Sunday, 20 February 2011. Ghetts was not in the list, and "vowed to make a track sending for the panel who cast the list and also vowed to shoot a video and have it on YouTube in the morning." The song and video was finished the next day, premiering on Kiss 100 the day before the video upload. On 25 February 2011, the song was made available to download on iTunes, along with another song titled "I Told Ya" featuring Rapid – which also had a video shot and uploaded by GrimeDaily on 24 February 2011. Ghetts collaborated with Cher Lloyd on her record "Dub on the Track" in 2011. He featured on Clement Marfo & The Frontline's single "Overtime". He released the single "On A Level" in late 2011. The official remix features Scorcher, Kano, and Wretch 32.

=== 2013–2014: Rebel with a Cause ===
Ghetts' debut album Rebel with a Cause was released on 10 March 2014 on the independent label Disrupt. The album campaign started with a spoken word video "Definition of a rebel", followed by the non-album single "The Cypher" which was released on 28 July 2013. The track peaked at number 9 in the iTunes hip-hop charts. The album's lead single "Rebel" became available to download when you pre-order the album from 2 February onwards.

On 19 September, US singer Chris Brown co-signed East London MC Ghetts and shared the video for his track "Feel Inside" declaring "What Ya'll Think?'.

Ghetts had reportedly recorded more than 150 songs for the album (with some footage of his demos found on YouTube). Release dates for Rebel with a Cause dated back from 2010; reportedly, it was meant to have been released after his mixtape The Calm Before The Storm. Unknown to many, the album was originally called The Justifications of J. Clarke, but in a 2010 interview with SBTV, he stated that he wasn't ready to have made an album of that manner.

=== 2018: Ghetto Gospel: The New Testament ===
On 30 August 2018, Ghetts officially announced the follow-up to his 2007 release Ghetto Gospel, titled Ghetto Gospel: The New Testament, was due for release on 14 September 2018. Along with the album announcement, Ghetts shared the first single from the album, "Black Rose" featuring Kojey Radical. The album featured artists including President T, Wretch 32, Donae'o, Jordy, Suspect, Ryan De La Cruz, Little Simz, Stefflon Don, Chip, Kojey Radical, and many more.

Ghetts also made singles after this album, including "Listen" (which was featured on the TV series Top Boy and made it onto the series' official album), "Drill Work" (produced by Swindle and is featured on Swindles' album No More Normal), "Bad After We" (with Kojey Radical & Shy FX which features on Shy FX's album Raggamuffin Sound Tape), and "Legends Don't Die" (honouring the deaths of artists involved in the grime scene; Stormin, Cadet, Depzman, and Esco).

=== 2021: Conflict of Interest ===
On 19 February 2021, Ghetts released his third studio album Conflict of Interest. Backed by Warner Music, the album campaign involved the rollout of singles featuring other artists like Stormzy, Jaykae, Backroad Gee and Pa Salieu. The album was well-received and ranked highly on the charts, with Ghetts riding through London in tank while performing some tracks to push additional sales and streams. Conflict of Interest finished second on the Official Albums Charts, which is Ghetts’ highest chart position to date. The album received positive reviews, with some stating that the body of work will finally move Ghetts "out of the shadows of his better-awarded peers."

== Other projects ==
He made his acting debut in the Netflix Original series Supacell, playing one of the primary antagonists, "Krazy". The show was created, written and directed by Rapman.

== Personal life ==
Ghetts describes himself as half-Jamaican and half-Grenadian.

=== Political views ===
In November 2019, along with 34 other musicians, Ghetts signed a letter endorsing the Labour Party leader Jeremy Corbyn in the 2019 UK general election with a call to end austerity.

=== Legal issues ===
Ghetts was charged with causing death by dangerous driving following a hit-and-run in Ilford, London, in October 2025. He appeared in court on 24 November, where he was charged with two further counts of dangerous driving before and after the incident. On 8 December, he pleaded guilty to causing death by dangerous driving. On 3 March 2026, Ghetts received a 12‑year prison sentence.

== Discography ==
=== Studio albums ===
List of albums, with selected chart positions
Title	Album details	Peak chart positions
Title	Album details	UK
Rebel with a Cause	Released: 10 March 2014; Label: Disrupt; Formats: CD, digital download	23
Ghetto Gospel: The New Testament	Released: 14 September 2018; Label: GIIG; Formats: CD, digital download, vinyl	30
Conflict of Interest	Released: 19 February 2021; Label: Warner; Formats: CD, digital download, vinyl	2
On Purpose, with Purpose	Released: 23 February 2024; Label: Warner; Formats: CD, digital download, vinyl	29
Forbidden Frequencies (with Rude Kid)	Released: 10 December 2024; Label: Self-released; Formats: Streaming only via NFC tag	—

=== Mixtapes ===
- 2005: 2000 & Life
- 2007: Ghetto Gospel
- 2008: Freedom of Speech
- 2010: The Calm Before the Storm
- 2011: Momentum [Hosted by DJ Whoo Kid]
- 2014: Momentum 2 (The Return of Ghetto)

=== EPs ===
- 2010: Merry Christmas EP
- 2015: 653 - EP (with Rude Kid)

=== Singles ===
Title	Year	Peak chart positions		Album
Title	Year	UK	UK R&B	Album
"Top 3 Selected"	2008	—	—	Ghetto Gospel
"Sing for Me"	2008	—	—	Non-album singles
"Sing 4 Me (Remix)"	2009	—	—	Non-album singles
"Don't Phone Me" (featuring Griminal)	2009	—	—	Non-album singles
"Don't Phone Me (Remix)" (featuring Fumin & Lil Nasty)	2009	—	—	Non-album singles
"Skadoosh" (featuring Maxsta & Doller Da Dustman)	2010	—	—	The Calm Before the Storm
"Trained to Kill" (featuring Dot Rotten)	2010	—	—	The Calm Before the Storm
"Grime Daily"	2010	—	—	The Calm Before the Storm
"Who's on the Panel"	2011	—	—	Non-album singles
"I Told Ya" (featuring Rapid)	2011	—	—	Non-album singles
"Rebel"	2014	—	5	Rebel with a Cause
"Mozambique" (featuring Jaykae & Moonchild Sanelly)	2020	—	—	Conflict of Interest
"IC3" (featuring Skepta)	2020	—	—	Conflict of Interest
"Proud Family"	2020	—	—	Conflict of Interest
"Skengman" (featuring Stormzy)	2021	50	—	Conflict of Interest

==== As featured artist ====
Song	Year	Album
"Dub on the Track" (Cher Lloyd featuring Mic Righteous, Dot Rotten and Ghetts)	2011	Sticks + Stones
"U Get Me?" (Guvna B featuring Ghetts)	2023	The Village Is On Fire

=== Other charted songs ===
Title	Year	Peak chart positions	Album
Title	Year	UK	Album
"Crud" (featuring Giggs)	2021	88	Conflict of Interest

== Filmography ==
Year	Title	Role	Notes
2018	The Intent 2: The Come Up	Jay	Lead role
2024	Supacell	Craig "Krazy"	5 episodes
