= Kano (British musician) =

British rapper (born 1985)

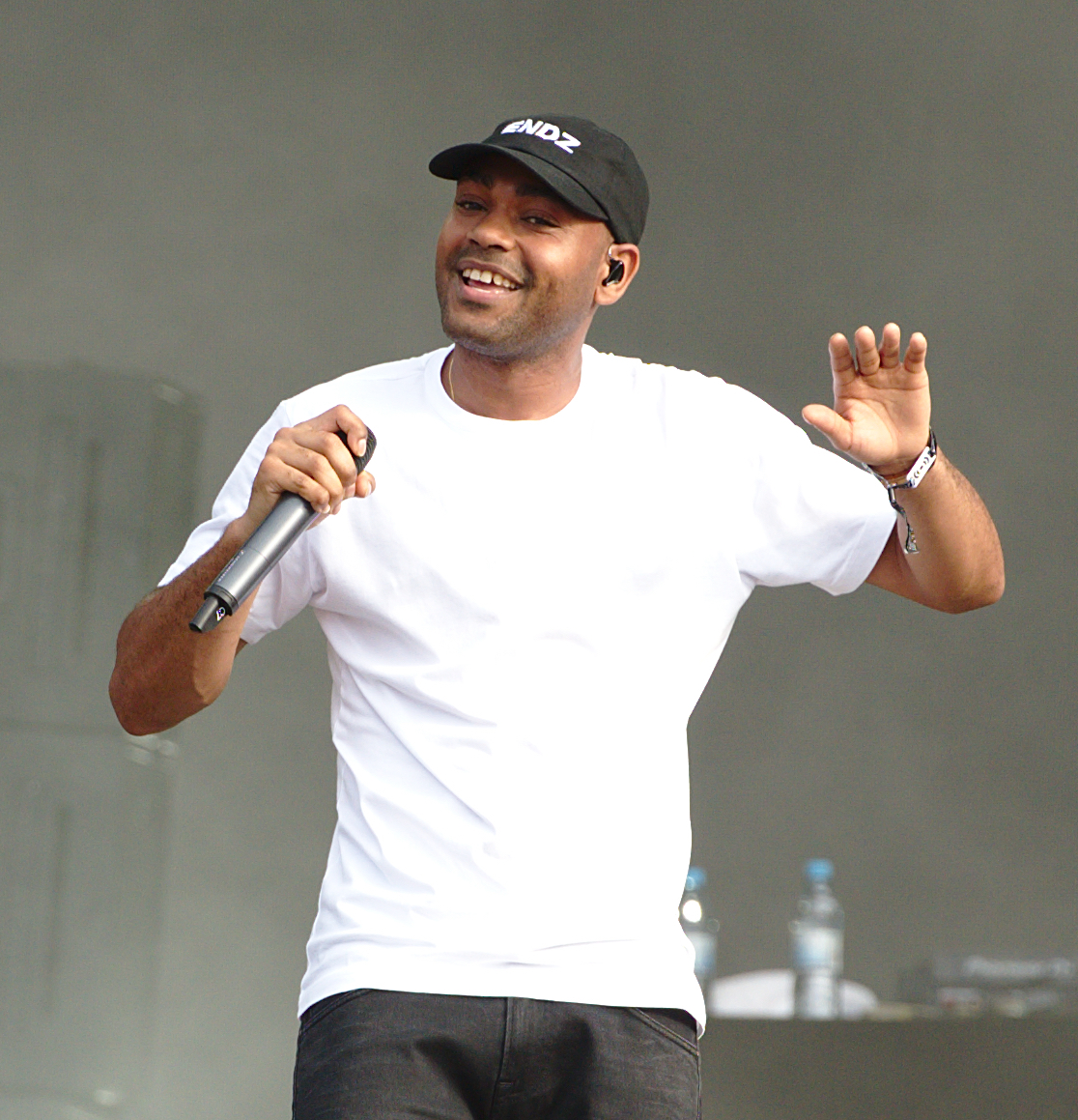
- Kano performing in 2017

Background information
- Also known as: Kano; KA
- Born: Kane Brett Robinson; 21 May 1985 (age 41); East Ham, London, England
- Genres: British hip-hop; grime; UK garage
- Occupations: Rapper; songwriter; actor
- Years active: 2000–present
- Labels: 679 (2005–2007); Bigger Picture (2008–present); Parlophone (2016–present)
- Formerly of: Nasty Crew
- Website: kanomusic.com

Kane Brett Robinson (born 21 May 1985), known by the stage name Kano, is a British rapper, songwriter and actor from East Ham, London. His fifth album, Made in the Manor was shortlisted for the 2016 Mercury Prize and won Best Album at the 2016 MOBO Awards. On screen, he played the role of Sully in Top Boy (2011–2023).

== Music career ==
=== 1985–2003: early years ===
Kane Robinson, born in the London Borough of Newham, was born to Jamaican parents and raised by his mother, a PE teacher, first living on Manor Road and later in East Ham. He attended Langdon Secondary School. In his younger years he was a semi-professional footballer, representing Chelsea, West Ham United, Norwich City and Celtic by the age of thirteen, eventually abandoning his sporting ambitions in favour of a musical career.

Robinson dabbled in composing using Cubase and a keyboard in his youth, and started MCing aged fourteen after his older brother Lee "Chopper" Robinson, an aspiring DJ, got a pair of turntables for his sixteenth birthday; the pair would record UK garage sets together on cassette tape and share them with friends, which earned Lee a residency on Canning Town pirate radio station Flava FM. Kano's school friend Sharky Major, founder of Nasty Crew, was also a resident on the station, and invited him to guest on the group's show as early as 2001; by 2002, he formally became a member of the crew. The station's transmissions were only available within the immediate East London area and listeners initially knew him solely through his voice before he began getting live bookings through the crew.

Kano's second ever vinyl release, "Vice Versa (Boys Love Girls)", was recorded before he joined the crew and released via Jammer's label, Jahmek the World. He also contributed to various releases as a part of N.A.S.T.Y., including their second ever single, December 2002's "Take You Out". Robinson used the crew's underground popularity as a springboard, and appeared as a cover star in The Face alongside colleagues D Double E and Hitman Hyper. He signed a record deal with 679 Recordings on his nineteenth birthday in 2004. He gained wider recognition after appearing on an official remix of The Streets' "Fit but You Know It", featured on Channel U, and on Jammer's first Lord of the Mics grime battle DVD, clashing Wiley, as well as through placements on MTV Base and the Risky Roadz DVD series. At this time, he was working closely with fellow Nasty members Ghetts and Demon, alongside whom he was slated to appear on the second CD of a Nasty Crew "street album" which was ultimately never released.

=== 2004–2005: Home Sweet Home ===
In 2004, Robinson was asked to model for Hugo Boss, but he declined to begin recording and touring commitments. Shortly afterwards he released his debut under 679 Recordings, "P's & Q's", which served as the lead single from his debut album and became an underground hit. In February 2005, he released the album's second single, "Typical Me", produced by Fraser T Smith and featuring Ghetts. "Typical Me" reached No. 22 in the UK Singles Charts. The third single, "Remember Me", fared less well in the charts, reaching No. 71. Two weeks later, on 27 June 2005, his debut album Home Sweet Home was released. It debuted inside the UK top 40 at No. 36 in its first week. In September 2005, the fourth single "Nite Nite" was released, featuring Leo the Lion and The Streets. Home Sweet Home went on to gain gold status in the UK, and was well reviewed across the British press.

Four songs which Robinson contributed to featured on 679's 2005 compilation Run the Road, including the VIP version of Jammer's "Destruction". "Nite Nite" was released as the next single from Home Sweet Home, hitting No. 25 in the UK charts and spending six weeks altogether in the top 75. Shortly after the release of "Nite Nite", a promotional video for "Reload It", which featured live performance clips and backstage footage, was released to UK video station, Channel U. In December 2005, Robinson released a remixed version of album track "Nobody Don't Dance No More" featuring Katie Pearl, as a download-only single. The track was also featured as a B-side on CD: 2 of "Nite Nite". On 13 March 2006, Robinson released the fifth and final single from the album, a double A-side of "Brown Eyes" and "Signs in Life". The single was released on a vinyl format only, and included a free sticker, which made it ineligible for chart inclusion.

Amidst the Home Sweet Home album campaign, Robinson parted ways with Nasty Crew in 2005, a decision which co-founder Marcus Nasty has stated on the record was due to their relationship becoming fraught after Kano became represented by a manager and had to navigate the competing interests of his team and the crew. Robinson's departure was subsequently a factor in Ghetts and Demon's decisions to leave the crew.

=== 2006–2007: London Town ===
On 23 March 2006, Robinson performed at Anson Rooms in Bristol for MTV2's Spanking New Music along with JME, N-Dubz and Unklejam. He performed tracks including "London Town", "P's & Q's", "Brown Eyes", "Me & My Mic" and tracks from the Beats & Bars mixtape. Robinson confirmed on the show that his next album was to be called London Town.

Prior to the album's release, Robinson put out a mixtape (simply called Mixtape on the front cover), which included new material and his own versions of hip-hop songs, including Jay-Z's "Public Service Announcement", Nas's "Black Republican" and Kanye West's "My Way Home". The mixtape also included a preview of "Buss It Up", a song that featured on the later release London Town. The album was released on 10 September 2007, preceded by the single "This Is The Girl", featuring Craig David, on 27 August. Along with David, the album featured collaborations with Blur and Gorillaz frontman Damon Albarn, Kate Nash, and Vybz Kartel. Robinson toured the UK in support of the record, as well as performing the whole album at the Jazz Cafe in October 2007 alongside a live band. Kano also sold out London Astoria in the same month to put on an entertaining show also promoting Tinchy Stryder on his tour.

=== 2008–2009: 140 Grime St and MC No. 1 ===
In 2008, Robinson was no longer signed to 679 Recordings as he wished to return to his "grimier roots" and had posted all new freestyles on his MySpace page. In April of that year, he released a mixtape, MC No. 1, followed by a third album, 140 Grime Street. Despite primarily using American hip-hop-style beats, seemingly contra to his previous comments, both were well received. 140 Grime Street was released on 29 September 2008 through his own independent label, Bigger Picture Music. The majority of the album was produced by Mikey J, with Wiley and DaVinChe supplying two beats each, and Skepta handling the production for the song "These MC's". The album featured guest appearances from Ghetto, Skepta, Wiley, and Mikey J. The first single released was "Hustler."

A second single, "Rock N Rolla", was first premiered on Radio 1xtra DJ Mista Jam's radio show. The single was officially released in October. "More Than One Way" also premiered on Mista Jam's 1xtra radio show. The video was also released on Kano's official YouTube page. The track was written for a campaign to promote the Diploma and was given away for free exclusively from The Diploma website. The music video was made with the help of students from around the UK. The TV ad shows Robinson walking through a crowd of students whose Diploma qualifications pop up in bubbles above them. Creative and media students helped in producing the video and construction students helped make the set.

=== 2010–2013: Method to the Maadness and mixtapes ===
Robinson's fourth album, Method to the Maadness, was released on 30 August 2010 and charted in the UK Albums Chart at number 45, making it the rapper's fourth successive album to appear in the Top 50. The lead single, "Upside" (featuring Michelle Breeze), was released on 23 August 2010. That same year he provided vocals on the third Gorillaz studio album, Plastic Beach. He collaborated with fellow British rapper Bashy and the National Orchestra for Arabic Music on the track "White Flag".

In September, Robinson announced a four-track collaborative EP with the producer Mikey J. The EP was entitled Not for the A List because Robinson did not want anything to stand in his way when it came to making the music. Part of the EP was to make one track a week and to release it to a DJ to play on radio, ensuring it was a different DJ each week over a timeline of four weeks. The first track was "Random Antics"' the second track, "Alien", and featured Maxsta, the first label signing by the SBTV founder Jamal Edwards. The third week was a track titled "E.T", featuring Wiley, Scorcher and Wretch 32. The fourth track, "House of Pain", featuring Ghetts, was delayed due to the length being 7 1/2 minutes. The DJ had to get permission from his boss to play it. It was expected Robinson is using the EP to build anticipation for his fifth studio album, to be released in 2012.

On 13 November 2011, Robinson announced via Twitter that he would release a mixtape some time that month entitled Girls Over Guns. On 1 January 2012, he released a mixtape called Jack Bauer 2.4 as the follow-up mixtape to the 2010 edition.

=== 2014–2018: Made in the Manor ===
On 26 April 2014, Robinson released a music video via SB.TV for "Flow of the Year' featuring JME. The following year came his single "Hail" in March 2015 and its B-side "New Banger" released via Noisey in April 2015. This preceded his fifth album Made in the Manor, eventually released in 2016. Promotion for the album began with the single "3 Wheel-Ups" featuring Wiley and Giggs. The song premiered on MistaJam's BBC Radio 1Xtra show on 7 January 2016. It entered the UK Singles Chart at number 126 and the UK R&B Chart at number 16.

The album entered the UK Albums Chart at number 8, becoming Robinson's highest-charting album since London Town (2007).

=== 2019–present: Hoodies All Summer ===
On 30 August 2019, Robinson's sixth studio album Hoodies All Summer was released following its announcement the month previously. The album would be later shortlisted for the Mercury Prize 2020, the second time in his career. He provided vocals again in 2020 for the seventh Gorillaz studio album Song Machine, Season One: Strange Timez, along with Spanish singer Roxani Arias for the song "Dead Butterflies". In October 2020, Robinson collaborated with Fraser T. Smith in the production of Smith's debut album "12 Questions".

== Acting career ==
In October 2011, Robinson made his acting debut in the Channel 4 drama Top Boy. His character, Sully, was originally written as an Asian drug dealer. Casting director Des Hamilton, director Yann Demange and writer Ronan Bennett were so impressed with his chemistry test with co-star Ashley Walters, causing the character to be rewritten. The original run of the show went for two seasons, before Channel 4 cancelled it in 2014.

In 2017, it was announced that streaming platform Netflix would be reviving Top Boy, with Robinson reprising his role as Sully. The revival was, in part, due to the interest of Canadian rapper Drake, who was a fan of the original series and whose team co-produced the new episodes. The third and fourth series premiered on Netflix in September 2019 and March 2022, respectively. A fifth and final series was announced on 31 March 2022, and aired in September 2023.

Robinson plays the lead role in The Kitchen, a dystopian action drama for Netflix directed by Kibwe Tavares and Daniel Kaluuya, which premiered at the 67th London Film Festival on 15 October 2023.

== Awards, nominations and recognition ==
Robinson has won various awards including MOBO Awards for Best Newcomer in 2005, Best Album in 2016, and Best Performance in a TV Show/Film in 2022. He also won an award at the first Channel U "Best of British" Awards. On New Year's Eve 2005, he was announced as one of "London's Heroes of 2005" by Mayor of London Ken Livingstone.

Award	Year	Nominee(s)	Category	Result	Ref.
Urban Music Awards	2004	Himself	Best Newcomer	Won	
MOBO Awards	2005	Home Sweet Home	Best Album	Nominated	
MOBO Awards	2005	Himself	Best Hip-Hop Act	Nominated	
MOBO Awards	2005	Himself	Best UK Newcomer	Won	
MOBO Awards	2005	Himself	UK Act of the Year	Nominated	
Brit Awards	2006	Himself	British Urban Act	Nominated	
Mercury Prize	2016	Made in the Manor	Mercury Prize	Nominated	
MOBO Awards	2016	Made in the Manor	Best Album	Won	
Mercury Prize	2020	Hoodies All Summer	Mercury Prize	Nominated	
MOBO Awards	2022	Top Boy	Best Performance in a TV Show/Film	Won	

== Personal life ==
Robinson is a supporter of Liverpool F.C. His first child was born in 2023.

== Political views ==
In November 2019, along with 34 other musicians, Robinson signed a letter endorsing the Labour Party leader Jeremy Corbyn in the 2019 UK general election with a call to end austerity. In December 2019, along with 42 other leading cultural figures, he signed a letter endorsing the Labour Party under Corbyn's leadership in the 2019 general election. The letter stated that "Labour's election manifesto under Jeremy Corbyn's leadership offers a transformative plan that prioritises the needs of people and the planet over private profit and the vested interests of a few."

== Discography ==
- Home Sweet Home (2005)
- London Town (2007)
- 140 Grime Street (2008)
- Method to the Maadness (2010)
- Made in the Manor (2016)
- Hoodies All Summer (2019)

== Filmography ==
Film
Year	Title	Role	Notes
2006	Rollin' with the Nines	Kano	
2007	Point Blank	Akil	Short
2012	Tower Block	Mark	
2023	The Kitchen	Izi	

Television
Year	Title	Role	Notes
2011–2023	Top Boy	Sully	Series 1–5

Video games
Year	Title	Role	Notes
2007	Def Jam: Icon	Himself	Voice role and likeness
