= List of songs recorded by Plan B =

This is a comprehensive list of songs released, recorded, performed or written by Plan B.

== Released songs ==
=== Original songs ===
Song	Release	Year	Notes
"Altered Score"	Ill Manors	2012	Bonus track. Instrumental.
"Bizness Woman"	"No Good"	2007	B-side. Featuring Killa Kella.
"Breakdown"	Who Needs Actions When You Got Words	2006	Bonus track. Featuring The Earlies.
"Broke"	Live at The Pet Cemetery EP	2006	
"Bullet in His Head"	Ill Manors	2012	Bonus track
"Cast a Light"	Paint It Blacker	2007	Bootleg recording. Samples "Crosses" by José González.
"Charmaine"	Who Needs Actions When You Got Words	2006	Originally known as "Young Girl"
"Couldn't Get Along"	Who Needs Actions When You Got Words	2006	Alternate version appears on Paint It Blacker (2007) which samples "Analyse" by Thom Yorke
"Darkest Place"	The Defamation of Strickland Banks	2010	
"Dave from Leicester (Skit)"	Paint It Blacker	2007	
"Dead and Buried"	Who Needs Actions When You Got Words	2006	
"Deepest Shame"	Ill Manors	2012	Original version known as "Michelle" featuring Faith SFX used in Michelle (2008). Version of "Michelle" used in Ill Manors included as bonus track.
"Did You Just Call Me a Cunt?"	Ill Manors	2012	Bonus track. Instrumental.
"Drug Dealer"	Ill Manors	2012	Featuring Takura Tendayi
"Ed Woz Ere"	Ill Manors	2012	Bonus track. Instrumental.
"End in the Streets"	Adulthood	2008	
"Everyday"	Who Needs Actions When You Got Words	2006	
"Falling Down"	Ill Manors	2012	
"Free"	The Defamation of Strickland Banks	2010	
"First Past The Post"	First Past The Post	2019	
"Great Day for a Murder"	Ill Manors	2012	
"Happy as Larry"	Paint It Blacker	2007	Bootleg recording. Samples "Happy as Annie" by Larrikin Love.
"Hard Times"	The Defamation of Strickland Banks	2010	2011 single version features Elton John and Paloma Faith
"Hope in Hell"	Ill Manors	2012	Bonus track. Instrumental.
"Hustling"	Paint It Blacker	2007	Bootleg recording. Samples "God Put a Smile upon Your Face" by Coldplay and "Hustlin'" by Rick Ross.
"I Am the Narrator"	Ill Manors	2012	
"I Don't Hate You"	Who Needs Actions When You Got Words	2006	
"I Have Always Loved You"	Ill Manors	2012	Bonus track. Instrumental.
"I Know a Song"	The Defamation of Strickland Banks	2010	
"I Need Love"	Adulthood	2008	Featuring Jacob Anderson
"Ill Manors"	Ill Manors	2012	
"Intro"	It's Time 4 Plan B	2006	
"It's Your Time"	It's Time 4 Plan B	2006	Featuring Laurissa
"James Brown Is Dead (Skit)"	Paint It Blacker	2007	
"Kidz"	Who Needs Actions When You Got Words	2006	Alternate version appears on Paint It Blacker (2007) samples "Where the Humans Eat" by Willy Mason
"Knoxville Girl"	Paint It Blacker	2007	Bootleg recording. Samples "The Knoxville Girl" by The Louvin Brothers.
"Lost My Way"	Ill Manors	2012	
"Love Goes Down"	The Defamation of Strickland Banks	2010	
"Live Once"	Ill Manors	2012	Featuring Kano
"Lucicus (Skit)"	Paint It Blacker	2007	Bootleg recording. Samples "Money (That's What I Want)" by The Flying Lizards.
"Mama (Loves a Crackhead)"	Who Needs Actions When You Got Words	2006	Alternate version appears on Paint It Blacker (2007) which samples "I Can't Go For That (No Can Do)" by Hall & Oates
"Missing Links"	Who Needs Actions When You Got Words	2006	Alternate version appears on Paint It Blacker (2007) which samples "Pyramid Song" by Radiohead
"My Boy's a Mad Boy Y'Know"	Ill Manors	2012	Bonus track. Instrumental.
"My Life"	It's Time 4 Plan B	2006	Alternate version appears on Live at The Pet Cemetery EP (2006)
"No Good"	Who Needs Actions When You Got Words	2006	
"No More Eatin'"	Who Needs Actions When You Got Words	2006	Alternate version appears on Live at The Pet Cemetery EP (2006)
"Not This Time Gal (Skit)"	Paint It Blacker	2007	
"Paint It Blacker"	Paint It Blacker	2007	Bootleg recording. Samples "Paint It, Black" by The Rolling Stones.
"Pity the Plight"	Ill Manors	2012	Featuring John Cooper Clarke. Instrumental versions called "Pity the Plight Score" and "Pity the Fate Score" appear as bonus tracks.
"Playing with Fire"	Ill Manors	2012	Featuring Labrinth
"Prayin'"	The Defamation of Strickland Banks	2010	
"Rakin' the Dead"	Who Needs Actions When You Got Words	2006	Bonus track. Also appears on It's Time 4 Plan B (2006).
"The Recluse"	The Defamation of Strickland Banks	2010	
"Rescue"	Ill Manors	2012	Bonus track. Instrumental.
"The Runaway"	Ill Manors	2012	
"See, It Didn't Kill Me Did It?"	Ill Manors	2012	Bonus track. Instrumental.
"She Said"	The Defamation of Strickland Banks	2010	
"Sick 2 Def"	Who Needs Actions When You Got Words	2006	Also appears on It's Time 4 Plan B (2006). Alternate version featuring The Earlies used on LP formats and as b-side to "Mama (Loves a Crackhead)".
"Some1's Switched in Harvey Nicks"	It's Time 4 Plan B	2006	
"Spend My Money"	The Defamation of Strickland Banks	2010	Bonus track. Also b-side of "Stay Too Long" (2010).
"Stay Too Long"	The Defamation of Strickland Banks	2010	
"Suzanne"	Paint It Blacker	2007	Bootleg recording. Samples "Suzanne" by Leonard Cohen.
"Tough Love"	Who Needs Actions When You Got Words	2006	
"Traded in My Cigarettes"	The Defamation of Strickland Banks	2010	
"Verses"	The Defamation of Strickland Banks	2010	Bonus track
"Waiting for the Sun Score"	Ill Manors	2012	Bonus track
"Welcome to Hell"	The Defamation of Strickland Banks	2010	
"What You Gonna Do"	The Defamation of Strickland Banks	2010	
"What's That? It's a Baby"	Ill Manors	2012	Bonus track. Instrumental.
"Where Ya From?"	Who Needs Actions When You Got Words	2006	
"Who Needs Actions When You Got Words"	Who Needs Actions When You Got Words	2006	Alternate version appears on Paint It Blacker (2007) which samples "Plateau" by Nirvana
"Wild Horses"	Paint It Blacker	2007	Bootleg recording. Samples "Wild Horses" by The Rolling Stones.
"Writing's on the Wall"	The Defamation of Strickland Banks	2010	
"Your Mother Was a Prostitute"	Ill Manors	2012	Bonus track. Instrumental.

=== Collaborations ===
==== Featuring Plan B ====
Song	Artists	Release	Year	Notes
"All of You"	Riz MC, Aruba Red, Plan B	MICroscope	2012	Original 2011 recording does not feature Plan B
"Atomic"	Labrinth, Plan B	Atomic	2013	
"Before I Die" (remix)	Professor Green, Narstie, Ghetto, Plan B, Example	"Before I Die"	2006	
"Bring It Back"	Juse, J.B., Plan B, Tyna	Global Casino	2006	
"Broken Wings"	MC Purple, Doctor, Plan B	Eye of the Tiger, Vol. 1	2005	
"Cap Back"	Wonder, Plan B	Run the Road	2005	
"End Credits"	Chase & Status, Plan B	No More Idols	2011	
"Everyday" (Rusher remix)	Shameless, Example, Plan B	"Everyday (In a Broken Dream)"	2007	
"Fool Yourself"	Chase & Status, Plan B, Rage	No More Idols	2011	
"Harry" (Plan B remix)	Medison, Skrein, Plan B	"Harry"	2010	
"How's It Feel"	Skrein, Wyt-Fang, Plan B	The Eat Up	2007	Also appears on It's Time 4 Plan B (2006)
"I Wanna Get Next to You" (remix)	Danielle Senior, Plan B, Wretch 32, Blemish	"Take You Home"	2006	
"Last Dayz"	Skreintax, Plan B	"Scene Stealers"	2009	
"Makin' Love 2 Hip Hop"	Plan B, Skrein, Shameless	Sharpest Tool in the Box	2007	
"Maybe"	Skrein, Shameless, Plan B, Sem	Bless: The Mixtape	2007	
"More Is Enough"	Epic Man, Plan B	"More Is Enough"	2006	Also appears as bonus track on Australian release of Who Needs Actions When You Got Words (2006) and on Time 4 Plan B EP (2007)
"My Eyes"	Shameless, TB, Plan B, Dat	Bless: The Mixtape	2007	
"No Hats No Trainers"	Shameless, Plan B	Smokers Die Younger	2007	
"On It 08"	Adam Deacon, Plan B, Snakeyman, Blazay, Alphadecious	Adulthood	2008	
"Past That"	Shameless, Plan B	Above Board	2006	
"Pieces"	Chase & Status, Plan B	More than Alot	2008	
"Play Ur Position"	Juse, Conspicuous, Anecdote, Shameless, Plan B, Infallible, Cyphanetik	Global Casino	2006	
"Polarised Nation"	Carly Bond, Ripper, Hitman Tigger, Doctor, Plan B, Riddles, Doom-Man, Faction G, TKO Punisha	Eye of the Tiger, Vol. 1	2005	
"Reveal Your Inner Self" (Plan B remix)	Killa Kela, Plan B	"Reveal Your Inner Self"	2007	
"Shifty"	Riz MC, Sway, Plan B	Shifty	2009	
"Shots Echo"	The Mitchell Brothers, Plan B, Ghetto	Dressed for the Occasion	2007	
"Tik Tok"	Skrein, Plan B	The Southcoast Soulshine EP, Vol. 1	2007	

==== Written by Plan B ====
Song	Artists	Release	Year	Notes
"Let You Go"	Chase & Status, Mali	No More Idols	2011	Co-written with Chase & Status
"Only You"	Delilah	From the Roots Up	2012	Co-written with Delilah and Tom Wright-Goss
"Time"	Chase & Status, Delilah	No More Idols	2011	Co-written with Chase & Status and Delilah

=== Cover versions ===
Song	Release	Year	Notes
"Coming Up Easy"	iTunes Festival: London 2010	2010	Paolo Nutini cover
"Pass Out"	Radio 1's Live Lounge, Vol. 5	2010	Tinie Tempah cover
"Runaway"	Like a Version, Vol. 7	2011	Kanye West cover
"Stop Me If You Think You've Heard This One Before"	Like a Version, Vol. 4	2008	The Smiths cover
"The Tracks of My Tears"	The Saturday Sessions 2011	2011	The Miracles cover
"Song 2"	The Saturday Sessions 2013	2013	Blur cover

== Unreleased songs ==
=== Original songs ===
Song	Year	Notes
"All Because of You"		Registered with ASCAP
"Cinnebon"		Registered with ASCAP
"Don't Be Afraid"	2012	Ill Manors out-take
"Make My Religion"	2010	Performed live in 2010
"Modern Day Jack the Ripper"	2008	Uploaded to MySpace
"Pillow Talk"		Registered with ASCAP
"So Many People"	2007	Uploaded to YouTube
"The Towers"	2012	Ill Manors out-take
"Wait on You"		Registered with ASCAP

=== Cover versions ===
Song	Year	Notes
"Acapella"	2010	Kelis cover. Performed live in 2010.
"In the Bleak Midwinter"	2010	Live Lounge performance

== See also ==
- Plan B discography
