= Plan B discography =

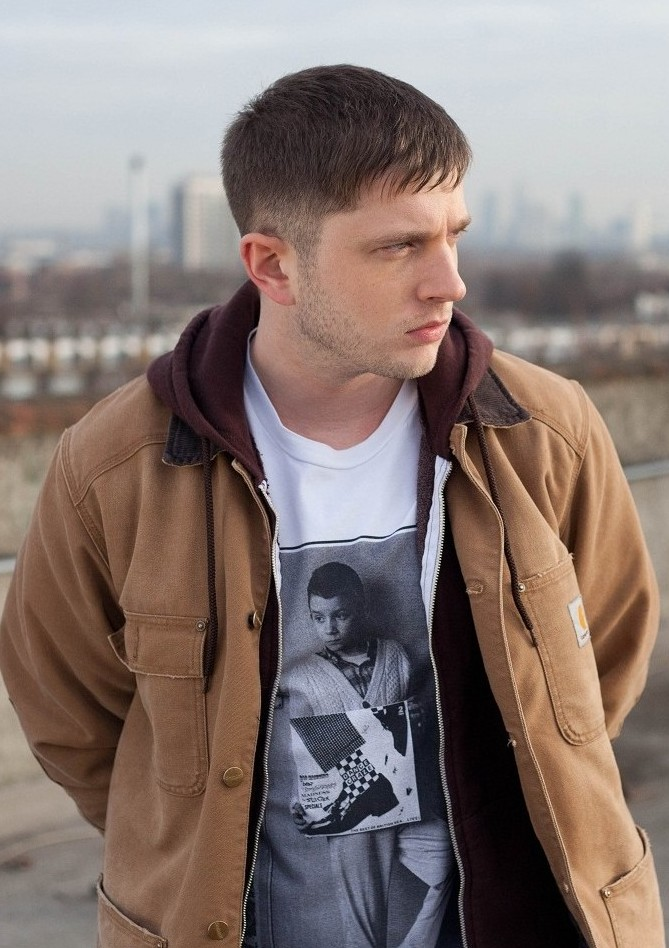
- Studio albums: 3
- Extended plays: 5
- Soundtrack albums: 1
- Singles: 11
- Music videos: 21
- Mixtapes: 2
- Promotional singles: 7
- Featured singles: 5

The discography of British rapper and songwriter Plan B consists of three studio albums, one soundtrack album, two mixtapes, three extended plays and eighteen singles. Plan B released his first single, the double A-side "Kidz / Dead and Buried" in 2005, as a limited edition 7" vinyl of which only 500 copies were pressed. The parent album, Who Needs Actions When You Got Words, was first released on 26 June 2006 through 679 Recordings—peaking at number thirty on the UK Albums Chart. The album's breakthrough single, "Mama (Loves a Crackhead)", was released in July 2006—marking the musician's first chart appearance, when it peaked at number forty-one in the United Kingdom"

In January 2010, Plan B released the single "Stay Too Long" as the lead single from his second studio album, The Defamation of Strickland Banks. The track saw Plan B attain his first top 10 single; peaking at number nine. Its successor, "She Said", was released in April 2010; attaining European chart success—peaking at number three in the UK, number two in Ireland and number ten in Germany. The album followed the tracks' release on 9 April 2010, debuting at number-one on the UK Albums Chart; having since been certified as triple platinum by the British Phonographic Industry. A further five singles were released from the studio album: "Prayin'", "The Recluse", "Love Goes Down", "Writing's on the Wall" and "Hard Times"—the latter of which featured additional vocals from Elton John and Paloma Faith.

To accompany the release of the film Ill Manors, Plan B released a soundtrack album of the same name on 23 July 2012. The lead single, also entitled "Ill Manors", became his third top ten single—peaking at number six in the United Kingdom. The follow-up singles, "Lost My Way", "Deepest Shame" and "Playing with Fire", all achieved different levels of success, peaking at No. 121, No. 27 and No. 78 respectively.

== Albums ==
=== Studio albums ===
Title	Details	Peak chart positions										Sales	Certifications (sales thresholds)
Title	Details	UK	AUS	AUT	BEL	DEN	FRA	GER	GRE	IRL	SWI	Sales	Certifications (sales thresholds)
Who Needs Actions When You Got Words	Released: 26 June 2006; Label: 679; Formats: CD, LP, download	30	—	—	—	—	—	—	—	—	—	UK: 124,126	BPI: Gold
The Defamation of Strickland Banks	Released: 9 April 2010; Label: 679/Asylum; Formats: CD, LP, download	1	25	11	89	18	23	7	12	7	41	UK: 1,290,199	BPI: 4× Platinum; IFPI EU: 2× Platinum
Heaven Before All Hell Breaks Loose	Released: 4 May 2018; Label: 679; Formats: CD, download	5	—	—	—	—	—	—	—	—	—		
"—" denotes releases that did not chart or was not released in that country or territory.

=== Soundtracks ===
Title	Details	Peak chart positions			Certifications (sales thresholds)
Title	Details	UK	AUS	IRL	Certifications (sales thresholds)
Ill Manors	Released: 23 July 2012; Label: 679/Warner Bros.; Formats: CD, 2xCD, download	1	9	3	BPI: Gold

=== Extended plays ===
- Live at The Pet Cemetery EP (2006)
- Remixes (2006)
- Time 4 Plan B (2007)
- iTunes Festival: London 2010 (2010)
- iTunes Festival: London 2012 (2012)

=== Mixtapes ===
- It's Time 4 Plan B (2006)
- Paint It Blacker: The Bootleg Album (2007)

== Singles ==
List of singles, with selected chart positions, year released, certifications and album name
Single	Year	Peak chart positions									Certifications (thresholds)	Album
Single	Year	UK	AUT	BEL	DEN	EU	FRA	GER	IRL	SWI	Certifications (thresholds)	Album
"Sick 2 Def" / "No Good"^{[A]}	2005	—	—	—	—	—	—	—	—	—		Who Needs Actions; When You Got Words
"Mama (Loves a Crackhead)"	2006	41	—	—	—	—	—	—	—	—		Who Needs Actions; When You Got Words
"Stay Too Long"	2010	9	—	—	—	—	—	—	—	—	BPI: Gold	The Defamation of Strickland Banks
"She Said"	2010	3	9	18	20	11	51	10	2	16	BPI: 2× Platinum; BVMI: Gold	The Defamation of Strickland Banks
"Prayin'"	2010	16	—	74	—	47	—	—	34	—	BPI: Silver	The Defamation of Strickland Banks
"The Recluse"	2010	35	—	—	—	—	—	—	—	—		The Defamation of Strickland Banks
"Love Goes Down"	2010	62	—	—	—	—	—	—	—	—	BPI: Silver	The Defamation of Strickland Banks
"Hard Times"^{[B]} (featuring Elton John and Paloma Faith)	2011	147	—	—	—	—	—	—	—	—		The Defamation of Strickland Banks
"Ill Manors"	2012	6	—	136	—	—	—	—	87	—	BPI: Silver	Ill Manors
"Deepest Shame"	2012	27	—	—	—	—	—	—	—	—		Ill Manors
"Playing with Fire" (featuring Labrinth)	2012	78	—	—	—	—	—	—	—	—		Ill Manors
"In the Name of Man"	2017	—	—	—	—	—	—	—	—	—		Non-album single
"Heartbeat"	2017	100	—	—	—	—	—	—	—	—		Heaven Before All; Hell Breaks Loose
"Guess Again"	2018	—	—	—	—	—	—	—	—	—		Heaven Before All; Hell Breaks Loose
"Queue Jumping"	2018	—	—	—	—	—	—	—	—	—		Heaven Before All; Hell Breaks Loose
"Grateful"	2018	—	—	—	—	—	—	—	—	—		Heaven Before All; Hell Breaks Loose
"It's a War"	2018	—	—	—	—	—	—	—	—	—		Heaven Before All; Hell Breaks Loose
"Stranger"	2018	—	—	—	—	—	—	—	—	—		Heaven Before All; Hell Breaks Loose
"Mercy"	2018	—	—	—	—	—	—	—	—	—		Heaven Before All; Hell Breaks Loose
"Wait So Long (Cadenza remix)" (featuring Ms. Banks and Lisa Mercedez)	2018	—	—	—	—	—	—	—	—	—		Heaven Before All; Hell Breaks Loose
"First Past the Post"	2019	—	—	—	—	—	—	—	—	—		TBA
"—" denotes releases that did not chart or was not released in that country or territory.

=== Promotional singles ===
List of promotional singles, with selected chart positions, year released and album name
Title	Year	Peak chart positions	Album
Title	Year	UK	Album
"Kidz" / "Dead and Buried"	2005	—	Who Needs Actions; When You Got Words
"Missing Links"	2006	—	Who Needs Actions; When You Got Words
"More Is Enough" (with Epic Man)	2006	—	Non-album single
"No More Eatin'"	2006	—	Who Needs Actions; When You Got Words
"She Said Prayin'" (live from the BRITs)	2011	72	Non-album single
"Writing's on the Wall"	2011	—	The Defamation of Strickland Banks
"Lost My Way"	2012	121	Ill Manors
"—" denotes releases that did not chart or was not released in that country or territory.

=== As featured artist ===
List of featured singles, with selected chart positions, year released and album name
Single	Year	Peak chart positions		Certifications (thresholds)	Album
Single	Year	UK	BEL	Certifications (thresholds)	Album
"No Hats, No Trainers" (Shameless featuring Plan B)	2007	—	—		Smokers Die Younger
"Pieces" (Chase & Status featuring Plan B)	2008	70	—		More than Alot
"Shifty" (Riz MC, Sway and Plan B)	2009	—	—		Shifty
"End Credits" (Chase & Status featuring Plan B)	2009	9	46	BPI: Platinum	No More Idols
"All of You" (Riz MC featuring Aruba Red and Plan B)	2012	—	—		MICroscope
"—" denotes releases that did not chart or was not released in that country or territory.

== Other certified songs ==
List of other certified songs
Title	Year	Certifications	Album
"Charmaine"	2006	BPI: Silver	Who Needs Actions When You Got Words

== Music videos ==
Year	Title	Director(s)
2005	"No Good"	Daniel Levi
2006	"Missing Links"	Paul Gore
2006	"Mama (Loves a Crackhead)"	Dawn Shadforth
2006	"No More Eatin'"^{[C]}	Nick Collett
2007	"Bizness Woman"	Mike Figgis
2009	"Stay Too Long"^{[D]}	Daniel Wolfe
2010	"She Said"	Daniel Wolfe
2010	"Writing's on the Wall"^{[E]}	Daniel Wolfe
2010	"Prayin'"^{[F]}	Daniel Wolfe
2010	"The Recluse"	Daniel Wolfe
2010	"Love Goes Down"	Daniel Wolfe
2012	"Ill Manors"	Yann Demange
2012	"Lost My Way"	Paul Caslin, Ben Drew
2012	"Deepest Shame"	Paul Caslin
2012	"Playing with Fire"	Colin Tilley

=== As featured artist ===
Year	Title	Director(s)
2006	"Before I Die" (remix) (with Professor Green, Narstie, Ghetto & Example)	
2007	"No Hats No Trainers" (with Shameless)	Paddy Haggaman
2008	"Pieces" (with Chase & Status)	Ben Drew
2009	"Shifty" (with Riz MC & Sway)	Eran Creevy
2009	"End Credits" (with Chase & Status)	Kim Gehrig
2012	"All of You" (with Riz MC & Aruba Red)	

== Compilation appearances ==
Year	Title	Album
2005	"Cap Back" (Wonder featuring Plan B)	Run the Road
2005	"Broken Wings" (Purple & Doctor featuring Plan B)	Eye of the Tiger, Vol. 1
2005	"Polarised Nation" (Carly Bond featuring Plan B, Ripper, Hitman Tiga, Doctor, Riddles, Doom-Man, Faction G & TKO Punisha)	Eye of the Tiger, Vol. 1
2006	"Past That" (Shameless featuring Plan B)	Above Board
2007	"Maybe" (Skrein featuring Plan B, Shameless & Sem)	Bless: The Mixtape
2007	"My Eyes" (Shameless featuring Plan B, TB & Dat)	Bless: The Mixtape
2007	"Tik Tok" (Skrein featuring Plan B)	The Southcoast Soulshine EP, Vol. 1
2007	"Makin' Love 2 Hip Hop" (Shameless featuring Plan B & Skrein)	Sharpest Tool in the Box
2008	"End in the Streets"	Adulthood
2008	"On It '08" (Adam Deacon featuring Plan B, Snakeyman, Blazay & Alphadecious)	Adulthood
2008	"I Need Love" (featuring Jacob Anderson)	Adulthood
2008	"Stop Me If You Think You've Heard This One Before"	Like a Version, Vol. 4
2010	"Pass Out"	Radio 1's Live Lounge, Vol. 5
2011	"Runaway"	Like a Version, Vol. 7
2011	"The Tracks of My Tears"	The Saturday Sessions 2011

== Guest appearances ==
Year	Title	Album
2006	"Play Ur Position" (Juse featuring Plan B, Conspicuous, Anecdote, Shameless, Infallible & Cyphanetik)	Global Casino
2006	"Bring It Back" (Juse featuring Plan B, J.B. & Tyna)	Global Casino
2006	"Before I Die" (MCs Remix) (Professor Green featuring Plan B, Narstie, Ghetto & Example)	Before I Die
2006	"I Wanna Get Next to You" (Plan B Remix) (Danielle Senior featuring Plan B, Wretch 32 & Blemish)	Take You Home
2007	"Reveal Your Inner Self" (Plan B Remix) (Killa Kela featuring Plan B)	Reveal Your Inner Self
2007	"Everyday" (Rusher Remix) (Shameless featuring Plan B & Example)	Everyday (In a Broken Dream)
2007	"How's It Feel" (Skrein featuring Plan B & Wyt-Fang)	The Eat Up
2007	"Shots Echo" (The Mitchell Brothers featuring Plan B & Ghetto)	Dressed for the Occasion
2009	"Last Dayz" (Skrein featuring Plan B & Tax)	Scene Stealers
2010	"Harry" (Plan B Remix) (Medison featuring Plan B & Skrein)	Harry
2011	"Fool Yourself" (Chase & Status featuring Plan B & Rage)	No More Idols
2014	"Pray for Love" (by Kwabs, produced by Plan B)	Non-album single

== Notes ==
- ^{A} "No Good" was re-released as a single in 2007.
- ^{B} Album version of "Hard Times" did not feature Elton John & Paloma Faith.
- ^{C} Music videos were also aired for the Hadouken! and Beni G & Brookes Brothers remixes.
- ^{D} A music video was also aired for the Pendulum remix.
- ^{E} A re-edited music video was also aired in 2011.
- ^{F} A music video was also aired for Breakage's Bad Week remix.

== See also ==
- List of songs recorded by Plan B
