= Dressed for the Occasion =

Dressed for the Occasion may refer to:

- Dressed for the Occasion (The Mitchell Brothers album)
- Dressed for the Occasion (Cliff Richard album)
