= Ill Manors (album) =

2012 soundtrack album by Plan B

Soundtrack album by Plan B
- Released: 23 July 2012
- Recorded: 2011–2012
- Studios: The Sanctuary (London, UK); Edge Recording Studio (Alderley Edge, UK)
- Genres: Hip hop; dubstep; grime
- Length: 46:11
- Label: Warner Bros.
- Producers: Plan B; Al Shux; Eric Appapoulay; David McEwan; 16bit; Labrinth; Saul Milton

Plan B chronology
The Defamation of Strickland Banks (2010)	Ill Manors (2012)	Heaven Before All Hell Breaks Loose (2018)

Singles from Ill Manors
- 1. "Ill Manors" Released: 23 March 2012; 2. "Lost My Way" Released: 2 July 2012; 3. "Deepest Shame" Released: 9 September 2012; 4. "Playing with Fire" Released: 3 December 2012

Ill Manors (stylised as ill Manors) is a soundtrack album by British musician and rapper Plan B released on 23 July 2012 as the soundtrack to the film of the same name. Several songs were used in the film Ill Manors, although some of the recordings were completed after the release of the film. The record was mainly produced by Al Shux and Plan B and also features collaborations with Labrinth, Kano, Takura Tendayi and John Cooper Clarke. Ill Manors debuted at number one on the UK Albums Chart and received widespread acclaim by critics. It was also nominated for the Mercury Prize.

== Background and composition ==
The film Ill Manors was written as a "hip hop musical for the twenty-first century", incorporating elements of both crime drama and music video sequences. Plan B had always intended to narrate the film with a different song for each the six stories, however some songs were written later, such as "Ill Manors". Due to success of The Defamation of Strickland Banks, Plan B toured extensively for two years and post-production of the film and the recording of the album was not completed until 2012.

Recording sessions for the album took place at The Sanctuary in London and Edge Recording Studio in Alderley Edge, Cheshire. Speaking about the album in an interview, Drew stated, "You could call it bassline, soul, with a bit of hip hop. The album has the lyrical depth of my first record but the musical composition is light years ahead, as it's informed by everything I've learnt in the last five years – writing, producing and playing with a live band. I feel I'm better than I've ever been." In an NME magazine interview with Drew on 31 March 2012, "I Am the Narrator", the first song heard in the film, was originally given the working title of "Fairydust". "Deepest Shame" was first written as a hip hop song entitled "Michelle" that was used in Drew's 2008 short film Michelle and features beatboxer Faith SFX. The version of "Michelle" that was used in Ill Manors has some elements similar to "Deepest Shame", however for the album release the song was re-written as more of a soul number, although "Michelle" is included on the deluxe edition bonus disc.

"Lost My Way" was first performed live on Later... with Jools Holland in May 2012 and Drew claimed that he was still writing the second verse on the way to the TV studio. Before its performance at Maida Vale, Plan B stated the working title of "Playing with Fire" was "Jake", named after its corresponding character in the film. During an interview via Digital Spy on 6 June 2012, Drew admitted that he had to yet to complete work on the record. After the performance, Drew was interviewed by Zane Lowe, and he admitted that although work was due to be completed on the album on that day, the album was still incomplete. In an NME interview in March 2012, it was stated that a track entitled "Don't Be Afraid", produced by former Plan B collaborators Chase & Status, had been pencilled in as the second single. The final album did not contain any production from Chase & Status. The same interview confirmed a track called "The Towers" had been completed. This did not feature on the album, and it is unclear whether it was re-titled or remains unreleased. "Lost My Way", "Great Day for a Murder" and "Live Once" do not feature in the movie. "Pity The Plight" contains different lyrics to the movie version, which deals with Chris getting information out of Terry at the garage. The album version deals with the stand-off between Chris, Jake and Marcell.

== Promotion and release ==
On 8 February 2012, it was announced the album would be released on 7 May via Atlantic Records. Shortly after, the album's lead single, Ill Manors, premiered. Subsequently, retail websites soon began to report that the release of the album had been put back, with a new release of 16 July now reported and later Amazon.co.uk and other retail websites soon reported that the album had been pushed back by another week, and was now due for release on 23 July. The deluxe version of the album includes a bonus disc of the original film score for Ill Manors with music composed by Shux and Plan B and the iTunes deluxe edition also includes two remixes of "Lost My Way" as bonus tracks.

On 11 May 2012, Drew premiered the album tracks "Lost My Way" and "Deepest Shame" during a performance on Later with Jools Holland. The official studio version of "Lost My Way" received its first play on BBC Radio 1 on 23 May 2012. It was made available in the form of a lyric video via YouTube later that evening. On 13 June 2012, Drew performed a live session in the BBC Radio 1 Live Lounge, which for a special occasion, was held at the Maida Vale Studios. During the performance, Drew premiered the tracks "Falling Down" and "Playing with Fire", as well as giving further performances of "Deepest Shame", "Lost My Way" and "Ill Manors". A free download of "Falling Down" became available to those who sign up to the official mailing list. On 23 July 2012, the album launch party took place in the underground car park of Great Suffolk Street Warehouse, in south-east London, a location that had previously been a secret. Labrinth commented "It's like a dungeon, but maybe it works with the whole Ill Manors concept!" The event featured several guest appearances, including Labrinth, Etta Bond, John Cooper Clarke, Kano, Takura and Faith SFX, who beatboxed and provided backing vocals. The event in its entirety was available to stream live on the LoveLiveTV YouTube channel, repeated once immediately after the event. Tracks were uploaded individually afterwards for playback.

== Singles ==
"Ill Manors" was released as the album's lead single on 25 March 2012. The track was premiered by Zane Lowe on BBC Radio 1 on 27 February 2012. The music video was made available on 4 March 2012. The single was officially made available on 25 March 2012. Ill Manors peaked at No. 6 on the UK Singles Chart on 1 April 2012. The track was also made available as a free download on pre-order of the deluxe edition of the album. The official music video contains footage of Plan B's spring forest tour, intercut with footage of Jake's story from the ill Manors movie. After the release of the album, "Lost My Way" charted at No. 121 on the UK Singles Chart from download sales.

"Deepest Shame" was released as the third single from the album, on 9 September 2012. The video for the track premiered on 6 August 2012. The video features Anouska Mond, who plays Michelle in ill Manors. The track has thus far peaked on the UK Singles Chart at No. 17, following the release of an EP of remixes. "Playing with Fire" was released as the fourth single from the album, on 3 December 2012. The track features vocals from producer and vocalist Labrinth. An animated video for the track premiered in July 2012, prior to the release of the album. The official video will reportedly premiere towards the end of September. The track's release as a single was confirmed by Labrinth at T4 on the Beach.

== Reception ==
Professional ratings
Aggregate scores
Source	Rating
Metacritic	83/100
Review scores
Source	Rating
AllMusic	4/5 stars
Drowned in Sound	8/10
The Guardian	4/5 stars
musicOMH	4/5 stars
Mojo	4/5 stars
NME	8/10
The Observer	4/5 stars
Q	4/5 stars
Spin	8/10
The Telegraph	5/5 stars

Ill Manors received widespread acclaim from music critics. At aggregate review website Metacritic the album attains an average score of 83 out of 100, based on reviews from 14 professional critics, which indicates "universal acclaim". The album was shortlisted for the 2012 Mercury Prize. The award was eventually given to An Awesome Wave by Alt-J.

== Track listing ==
No.	Title	Writer(s)	Producer(s)	Length
1.	"Ill Manors"	Ben Drew; Al Shuckburg; Vincent von Schlippenbach; David Conen; Pierre Baigorry; Dmitri Shostakovich	Al Shux; Plan B	3:46
2.	"I Am the Narrator"	Drew; Craig Merrin	16bit; Eric Appapoulay (add.)	3:35
3.	"Drug Dealer" (featuring Takura)	Drew; Shuckburg	Al Shux; Plan B	5:00
4.	"Playing with Fire" (featuring Labrinth)	Drew; Timothy McKenzie	Plan B; Labrinth	3:40
5.	"Deepest Shame"	Drew, Shuckburg	Al Shux; Plan B; Appapoulay (add.)	3:37
6.	"Pity the Plight" (featuring John Cooper Clarke)	Drew; Shuckburg; John Cooper Clarke; Christopher Heywood Brown	Al Shux; Plan B	4:21
7.	"Lost My Way"	Drew; Shuckburg	Al Shux; Plan B	4:42
8.	"The Runaway"	Drew; Shuckburg	Al Shux; Plan B	3:44
9.	"Great Day for a Murder"	Drew; Appapoulay; Cathal Joseph Smyth	Plan B; Appapoulay; Saul Milton	4:31
10.	"Live Once" (featuring Kano)	Drew; Kieron McIntosh	Al Shux; Plan B; Appapoulay (add.)	4:31
11.	"Falling Down"	Drew; Appapoulay; Richard Cassell; Tom Wright-Goss	Plan B; David McEwan; Appapoulay	4:44
Total length:				46:11

iTunes Store and Japanese bonus tracks
No.	Title	Writer(s)	Producer(s)	Length
12.	"Lost My Way" (Raekwon Remix)	Drew; Shuckburg; Corey Woods	Al Shux; Plan B	3:38
13.	"Lost My Way" (Nu:Tone Remix)	Drew; Shuckburg	Al Shux; Plan B	5:46

Deluxe Edition bonus disc: Ill Manors Film Score
No.	Title	Writer(s)	Producer(s)	Length
1.	"Your Mother Was a Prostitute"	Drew; Shuckburg	Al Shux; Plan B	1:34
2.	"My Boy's a Mad Boy Y'Know"	Drew; Shuckburg; Amir Amour	Al Shux; Plan B	1:15
3.	"Michelle"	Drew; Shuckburg	Al Shux; Plan B	2:13
4.	"Bullet in His Head"	Drew; Shuckburg; Appapoulay; Nick Ryan	Al Shux; Plan B	0:46
5.	"Did You Just Call Me a Cunt?"	Drew; Shuckburg	Al Shux; Plan B	1:37
6.	"See, It Didn't Kill Me Did It?"	Drew; Shuckburg	Al Shux; Plan B	1:39
7.	"Pity the Plight Score"	Drew; Shuckburg; Cooper Clarke; Heywood Brown	Al Shux; Plan B	2:00
8.	"Hope in Hell"	Drew; Shuckburg	Al Shux; Plan B	1:12
9.	"Waiting for the Sun Score"	Drew; Shuckburg	Al Shux; Plan B	2:17
10.	"What's That? It's a Baby"	Drew; Shuckburg	Al Shux; Plan B	1:25
11.	"Rescue"	Drew; Shuckburg	Al Shux; Plan B	1:04
12.	"Pity the Fate Score"	Drew; Shuckburg; Heywood Brown	Al Shux; Plan B	1:39
13.	"Altered Score"	Drew; Shuckburg; Harry Escott	Al Shux; Plan B	4:16
14.	"Ed Woz Ere"	Drew; Shuckburg	Al Shux; Plan B	1:24
15.	"I Have Always Loved You"	Drew; Shuckburg; Escott	Al Shux; Plan B	3:37
Total length:				27:58

Note

- "Playing with Fire" features uncredited vocals from Etta Bond.

Sample credits

- "Ill Manors" samples "Alles neu" by Peter Fox
- "I Am the Narrator" samples "Aquarium" from The Carnival of the Animals by Camille Saint-Saëns and an uncredited sample of "Sorcerer of Isis" by Power of Zeus

== Personnel ==
- Plan B – vocals, producer, mixing

Additional musicians

- Takura Tendayi – vocals
- Labrinth – vocals
- John Cooper Clarke – vocals
- Kano – vocals
- Etta Bond – backing vocals
- Christiana Kayode – backing vocals
- Obenewa Aboah – backing vocals
- Eric Appapoulay – backing vocals, guitar, bass, drums
- Al Shux – guitar, bass, additional keyboards
- Tom Wright-Goss – guitar
- Jean-Marie Brichard – bass
- Chris Heywood Brown - piano
- Kieron McIntosh – piano, keyboards
- Cassell the Beatmaker – drums
- Mark Winterburn – bass
- Joe Oakes – drums

Technical

- Al Shux – producer, mixing
- Eric Appapoulay – producer, additional producer, mixing
- David McEwan – producer, engineer, mixing
- 16bit – producer
- Labrinth – producer, additional mixing
- Saul Milton – producer
- Jimmy Robertson – engineer, mixing
- Al O'Connell – engineer
- Rich Costey – mixing
- Chris Kasych – assistant mixing
- John Davis – mastering
- Mark Winterburn – engineer, mixing

== Chart performance ==
=== Weekly charts ===
Chart (2012)	Peak position
Australian Albums (ARIA)	9
Irish Albums (IRMA)	3
UK Albums (Official Charts)	1

=== Year-end charts ===
Chart (2012)	Position
UK Albums (OCC)	56
Chart (2013)	Position
UK Albums (OCC)	179
