= Playing with Fire (Plan B song) =

Single by Plan B featuring Labrinth

from the album Ill Manors
- Released: 3 December 2012
- Recorded: 2011
- Genre: Hip hop; soul
- Length: 3:37
- Label: 679; Atlantic
- Songwriters: Ben Drew; Timothy McKenzie
- Producers: Plan B; Labrinth

Plan B singles chronology
"Deepest Shame" (2012)	"Playing with Fire" (2012)	"In the Name of Man" (2017)

Labrinth singles chronology
"Beneath Your Beautiful" (2012)	"Playing with Fire" (2012)	"Lover Not a Fighter" (2014)

Etta Bond singles chronology
"Treatment" (2012)	"Playing with Fire" (2012)	"Love Cards" (2013)

"Playing with Fire" is a hip hop song composed and performed by British rapper Plan B, featuring vocals from the track's producer and mixer, Labrinth, as well as uncredited backing vocals by Etta Bond. The song was released on 3 December 2012 as the fourth and final single from the ill Manors soundtrack, a film which Plan B also directed.

== Background ==
The track was originally due to be released as the album's third single, with an official lyric video being posted to YouTube shortly before the album's release on 23 July 2012. However, due to the continuing promotion of collaborator Labrinth's debut album, Electronic Earth, a music video was unable to filmed, and thus, the release was cancelled in favour of "Deepest Shame".

In August 2012, Labrinth confirmed that the track would be released as a single later in the year. On 31 October, Drew confirmed the release of the track as a single on 3 December, and also premiered the High Contrast remix that would make up part of the digital release. A day later, the official music video for the track premiered. On 30 October 2012, the High Contrast remix was released as a free download on Plan B's official SoundCloud page. As of May 2013, it has over 4,500 downloads. On 30 November 2012, the High Contrast remix was released on iTunes as a single.

== Music video ==
The music video for "Playing with Fire" was directed by Colin Tilley, and premiered on YouTube on 1 November 2012. The video features footage of the character Jake from ill Manors, intertwined with new images of Drew and Labrinth performing the song beneath a derelict tower block. A number of backing dancers begin to combust and set themselves on fire, with both Drew and Labrinth also ending up on fire by the end of the video. Backing vocalist Etta Bond and Labrinth's brother MckNasty also feature in the video.

== Track listing ==
- Digital download single
1. "Playing with Fire" (High Contrast remix) – 5:22
- Promotional CD single
1. "Playing with Fire" (radio edit) – 3:37

== Charts ==
Chart (2012)	Peak position
UK Singles (The Official Charts Company)	78

== Personnel ==
- Plan B – vocals, producer
- Labrinth – vocals, producer, additional mixing
- Etta Bond – backing vocals
- Jimmy Robertson – additional engineer
- Al Shux – mixing
- John Davis – mastering
