= Ill Manors (song) =

2012 single by Plan B

Single by Plan B

from the album Ill Manors
- Released: 25 March 2012
- Recorded: 2011
- Genre: Hip hop; big beat; electronica; breakbeat
- Length: 3:46
- Label: 679; Atlantic
- Songwriters: Ben Drew; Al Shuckburgh; Vincent von Schlippenbach; David Conen; Pierre Baigorry; Dmitri Shostakovich
- Producers: Al Shux; Plan B

Plan B singles chronology
"Hard Times" (2011)	"Ill Manors" (2012)	"Lost My Way" (2012)

Audio sample
- "Ill Manors": file; help

"Ill Manors" (stylised as "iLL Manors") is a hip hop protest song by English singer-songwriter Plan B. The track was released in the United Kingdom on 25 March 2012 as the lead single from the soundtrack to Ill Manors, a film written and directed by Plan B. The song was written in reaction to the 2011 riots across England, and specifically Plan B's perception of "society's failure to nurture its disadvantaged youth".

"Ill Manors" received mostly positive reviews from music critics and peaked at number six on the UK Singles Chart. In October 2012, the song won the Q Award for Best Track.

== Composition ==
Plan B returns to the hip hop style of his debut album Who Needs Actions When You Got Words with the release of "Ill Manors", after his more soulful second album The Defamation of Strickland Banks. The lyrics mingle perceived causes of the riots such as the closing of community centres with threats and jokes. The aggressive baseline in the song is designed to mirror the turmoil and unrest felt by those involved in the riots, engaging a "visceral energy" to raise awareness. It heavily samples "Alles neu" by Peter Fox, which itself uses elements from the fourth movement of Dmitri Shostakovich's Seventh Symphony.

== Context ==
The song, described by The Guardian's Dorian Lynskey as "the first great mainstream protest song in years," was written in response to the riots across England in August 2011. The song deals with both the causes and the consequences of the riots, concentrating on society's attitude towards the disadvantaged youth population of the United Kingdom. Drawing upon Plan B's own experiences of being expelled from school and attending a pupil referral unit, the song sarcastically attacks the media view of working class children: "Keep on believing what you read in the papers / Council estate kids—scum of the earth." Plan B intended both the song and the film of the same name to spearhead a wider project to address class divisions. In an interview with MistaJam on BBC Radio 1Xtra, the musician explained that the use of the word chav was just as offensive to "terms used to be derogatory towards race and sex".

== Release ==
The song was first played on BBC Radio 1 on 27 February 2012. and immediately after was available for streaming online on YouTube and SoundCloud. The single was released as a digital download on 25 March 2012.

== Reception ==
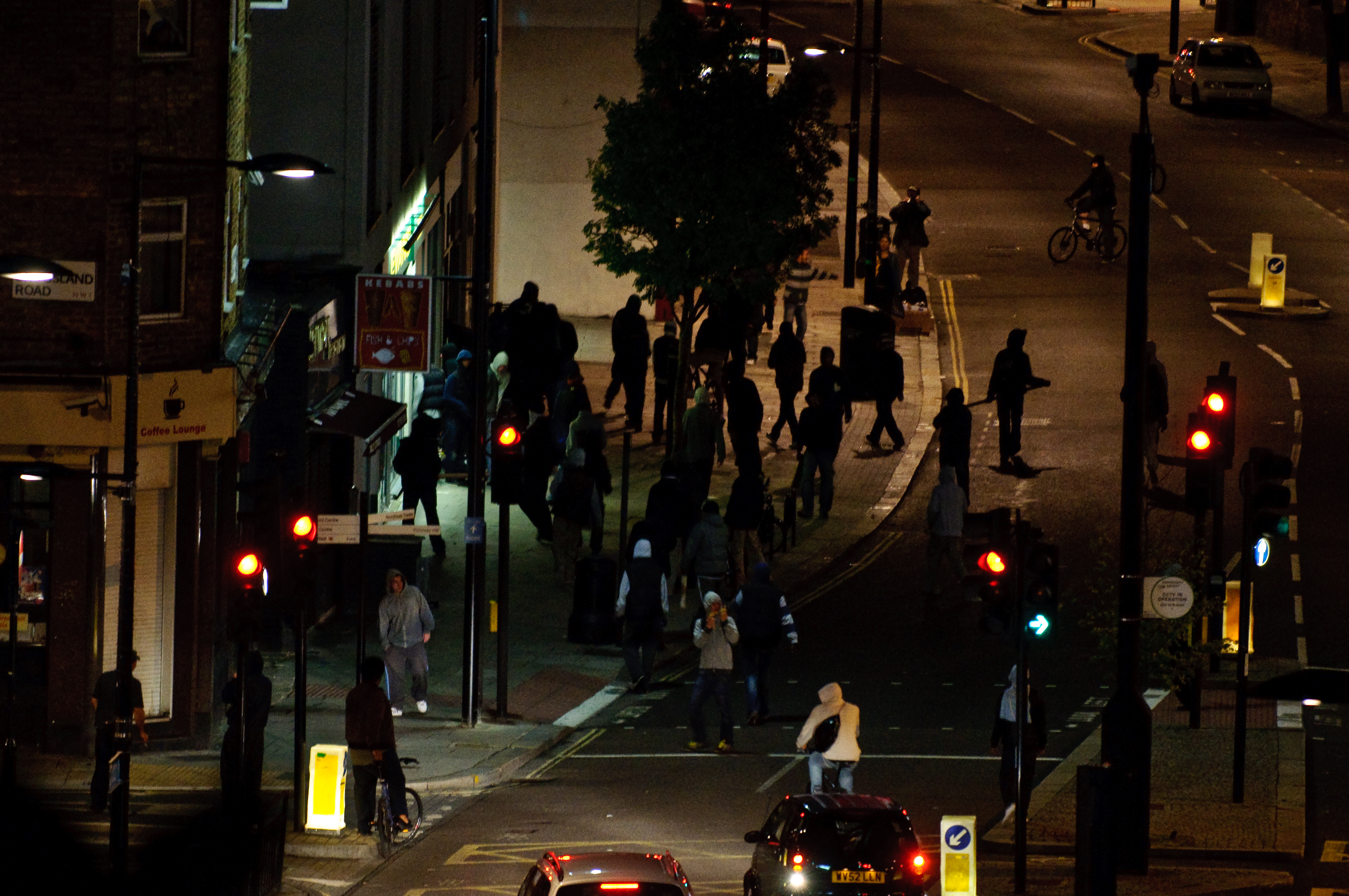
"Ill Manors" was written in reaction to the 2011 England riots.

Jamie Reed, the Member of Parliament for Copeland compared the song to Marvin Gaye's What's Going On, and continued to describe it as "excellent". Writing in The Independent, Tim Walker called it "an all-time great protest song", while David Smyth of the London Evening Standard praised Plan B's decision "to say something so bold." A contrasting opinion is voiced by Clash columnist Samuel Breen, also writing for The Independent, who describes the song as "a cliché riddled attack on politics that feels calculated, impersonal, and disingenuous." Breen also points out the apparently contrasting opinions made by Plan B, citing an editorial written by the rapper shortly after the riots in 2011, in which he castigated the rioters, claiming that they were damaging Britain with the actions. In contrast, Breen suggests that in "Ill Manors" Plan B is justifying the action taken by the rioters, something Plan B denies. In his interview with Radio 1Xtra, he clarified that he was "not trying to condone what happened during the riots."

== Chart performance ==
For the chart week ending 7 April 2012, "Ill Manors" débuted at number six on the UK Singles Chart with first-week sales of 37,455 copies. The track marks the musician's third top 10 hit following "Stay Too Long" (2010) and "She Said" (2010), which peaked at number nine and number three respectively. On the same charting week, "Ill Manors" débuted at number three on the UK R&B Chart behind Chris Brown's "Turn Up the Music" and Nicki Minaj's "Starships", also débuting at number nine on the Scottish Singles Chart. On its second charting week, the track registered a seventeen-place drop - falling from six to number twenty-three; marking the week ending 14 April 2012's biggest faller.

== Music video ==
The music video for "Ill Manors" was filmed on 17 February 2012 and was directed by Yann Demange. The video expands upon the themes of the song, and uses footage from the 2011 riots in London. David Cameron and Nick Clegg, the Prime Minister and Deputy Prime Minister of the United Kingdom both feature in the video, despite not being mentioned in the lyrics. However, Cameron's "Hug a Hoodie" campaign is alluded to. Some footage of the video was filmed in the Ledbury Estate in Peckham, one of the locations of the riots in London.

== Track listing ==
- UK CD single / digital download EP
1. "Ill Manors" – 3:46
2. "Ill Manors" (The Prodigy remix) – 3:55
3. "Ill Manors" (FuntCase remix) – 5:33
4. "Ill Manors" (acapella) – 3:34
5. "Ill Manors" (instrumental) – 3:46
- UK 12" vinyl
1. "Ill Manors" – 3:46
2. "Ill Manors" (The Prodigy remix) – 3:55
3. "Ill Manors" (FuntCase remix) – 5:33
- Digital download
1. "Ill Manors" – 3:46

== Personnel ==
- Plan B – vocals, producer

Production

- Al Shux – producer
- Rich Costey – mixing
- Chris Kasych – assistant mixing
- Mazen Murad – mastering

Sample credits

- "Ill Manors" samples "Alles neu" by Peter Fox

== Charts ==
=== Weekly charts ===
Chart (2012)	Peak position
Belgium (Ultratip Bubbling Under Flanders)	89
Ireland (IRMA)	87
Scottish Singles Sales (Official Charts)	9
UK Hip Hop/R&B (Official Charts)	3
UK Singles (Official Charts)	6
UK Official Streaming Chart Top 100	89

=== Year-end charts ===
Chart (2012)	Position
UK Singles (Official Charts Company)	135

== Certifications ==
Region	Certification	Certified units/sales
United Kingdom (BPI)	Silver	200,000^{‡}
^{‡} Sales+streaming figures based on certification alone.
