= The Defamation of Strickland Banks Tour =

2010–11 concert tour by Plan B

- Tour by Plan B
- Location: United Kingdom, Europe, United States, Oceania
- Associated album: The Defamation of Strickland Banks
- Start date: 20 January 2010
- End date: 4 September 2011
- Legs: 8

Plan B concert chronology
- Who Needs Actions When You Got Words Tour (2006–2007); The Defamation of Strickland Banks Tour (2010–2011)

The Defamation of Strickland Banks Tour was a concert tour by British musician Plan B in support of his second studio album The Defamation of Strickland Banks. Lasting from January 2010–September 2011, the tour visited the United Kingdom, Europe, the United States and Oceania.

== Background ==
The Defamation of Strickland Banks Tour was Plan B's first solo concert tour since the Who Needs Actions When You Got Words Tour in 2007. Following touring for his debut album, Plan B spent most of his time writing and recording for his second studio album and began a film career with roles in Adulthood (2008) and Harry Brown (2009). Plan B also toured as guest vocalist during Chase & Status' Debut Live Tour in 2009 performing "Pieces" and "End Credits" with the group.

Plan B commenced the tour with a warm up show at Café de Paris, London on 20 January 2010 and then embarked on a tour of the United Kingdom in April 2010 and played European festival dates during summer 2010. After the success of The Defamation of Strickland Banks album, which went on to become the UK's fifth best-selling album of the year, the tour was later expanded later into 2010 and 2011 with further legs in the United Kingdom, Europe, the United States, and Oceania.

Officially-released live performances recorded during the tour include "She Said" and "Welcome to Hell" (live from Cafe de Paris) released as bonus tracks on the deluxe edition of The Defamation of Strickland Banks and the iTunes Festival: London 2010 download EP released in July 2010.

== Live band ==
- Plan B – vocals
- Tom Wright-Goss – guitar
- Adam Jordan – guitar
- Jodi Milliner – bass
- Richard Cassell – drums
- Christiana Kayode – backing vocals
- LaDonna Harley-Peters – backing vocals
- Faith SFX – beatbox
- Sam Agard – drums (Legs 4–5)

== Support acts ==
- Faith SFX (2010–2011)
- Maverick Sabre (April 2010)
- WhenWeAreKings (April 2010)
- Tinie Tempah (26 July 2010)
- Clare Maguire (October 2010)
- Liam Bailey (March 2011)
- Eliza Doolittle (April 2011)
- Wretch 32 (31 May–1 June 2011)
- Katy B (25 August 2011)

== Set list ==
Wolverhampton Civic Hall Setlist, 3 March 2011
1. "Writing's on the Wall"
2. "Free"
3. "Welcome to Hell"
4. "Love Goes Down"
5. "Traded in My Cigarettes"
6. "Prayin'"
7. "Darkest Place"
8. "Coming Up Easy"
9. "Hard Times" / "Runaway" / "Charmaine"
10. "What You Gonna Do"
11. "She Said"

Encore

12. Soul Medley: "The Tracks of My Tears" / "Lean on Me" / "My Girl" / "Stand by Me"
13. Dubstep Medley: "Stand By Me" / "Baden Baden" / "Ain't No Sunshine" / "Kiss from a Rose" / "Forgot About B"
14. "No More Eatin'"
15. "Pieces"
16. "Stay Too Long"

== Tour dates ==
Date	City	Country	Venue
United Kingdom
20 January 2010	London	United Kingdom	Café de Paris
23 March 2010	Rugby	United Kingdom	Rugby Library
26 March 2010	London	United Kingdom	Royal Albert Hall^{[A]}
8 April 2010	Bristol	United Kingdom	Anson Rooms
9 April 2010	Oxford	United Kingdom	O2 Academy Oxford
10 April 2010	Birmingham	United Kingdom	O2 Academy Birmingham
11 April 2010	Brighton	United Kingdom	Concorde 2
12 April 2010	London	United Kingdom	The Garage
13 April 2010	Glasgow	United Kingdom	Classic Grand
14 April 2010	Leeds	United Kingdom	The Cockpit
15 April 2010	Manchester	United Kingdom	Manchester Academy
16 April 2010	London	United Kingdom	O2 Shepherd's Bush Empire
Europe (festivals)
1 May 2010	London	United Kingdom	Roundhouse^{[B]}
23 May 2010	Bangor	United Kingdom	Vaynol^{[C]}
12 June 2010	Dores	United Kingdom	Clune Farm^{[D]}
25 June 2010	Pilton	United Kingdom	Worthy Farm^{[E]}
2 July 2010	Abersoch	United Kingdom	Abersoch^{[F]}
3 July 2010	Naas	Ireland	Punchestown Racecourse^{[G]}
4 July 2010	Weston-super-Mare	United Kingdom	Weston-super-Mare^{[H]}
10 July 2010	Shepton Mallet	United Kingdom	Royal Bath and West Showground^{[I]}
26 July 2010	London	United Kingdom	The Roundhouse^{[J]}
27 July 2010	London	United Kingdom	Royal Festival Hall^{[K]}
30 July 2010	Paredes de Coura	Portugal	Paredes de Coura^{[L]}
6 August 2010	Newquay	United Kingdom	Watergate Bay^{[M]}
7 August 2010	Ledbury	United Kingdom	Eastnor Castle^{[N]}
9 August 2010	Leipzig	Germany	Moritzbastei
20 August 2010	Edinburgh	United Kingdom	HMV Picture House^{[O]}
21 August 2010	Staffordshire	United Kingdom	Weston Park^{[P]}
22 August 2010	Chelmsford	United Kingdom	Hylands Park^{[P]}
28 August 2010	Paris	France	Domaine national de Saint-Cloud^{[Q]}
12 September 2010	London	United Kingdom	Twickenham Stadium^{[R]}
29 September 2010	London	United Kingdom	O2 Academy Islington^{[S]}
United Kingdom
6 October 2010	Nottingham	United Kingdom	Rock City
7 October 2010	Norwich	United Kingdom	University of East Anglia
8 October 2010	London	United Kingdom	Brixton Academy
9 October 2010	London	United Kingdom	Brixton Academy
11 October 2010	Bristol	United Kingdom	O2 Academy Bristol
12 October 2010	Southampton	United Kingdom	Southampton Guildhall
13 October 2010	Cambridge	United Kingdom	Cambridge Corn Exchange
15 October 2010	Manchester	United Kingdom	Manchester Academy
16 October 2010	Newcastle	United Kingdom	O2 Academy Newcastle
17 October 2010	Lincoln	United Kingdom	Engine Shed
18 October 2010	Preston	United Kingdom	53 Degrees
20 October 2010	Dundee	United Kingdom	Fat Sam's
21 October 2010	Leeds	United Kingdom	O2 Academy Leeds
22 October 2010	Birmingham	United Kingdom	O2 Academy Birmingham
23 October 2010	Glasgow	United Kingdom	O2 Academy Glasgow
26 October 2010	Margate	United Kingdom	Winter Gardens
27 October 2010	Gloucester	United Kingdom	GL1
28 October 2010	Leicester	United Kingdom	O2 Academy Leicester
28 October 2010	London	United Kingdom	Roundhouse^{[T]}
29 October 2010	Sheffield	United Kingdom	O2 Academy Sheffield
30 October 2010	Liverpool	United Kingdom	Liverpool Guild of Students
Europe
14 November 2010	Edinburgh	United Kingdom	HMV Picture House
16 November 2010	Paris	France	Bataclan
17 November 2010	Lille	France	Splendid
18 November 2010	Cologne	Germany	Essigfabrik
19 November 2010	Hamburg	Germany	Uebel & Gefährlich
20 November 2010	Berlin	Germany	Postbahnhof
22 November 2010	Munich	Germany	Freiheiz
24 November 2010	Zurich	Switzerland	Kaufleuten
26 November 2010	Brussels	Belgium	Ancienne Belgique
27 November 2010	Amsterdam	Netherlands	Paradiso
28 November 2010	Copenhagen	Denmark	Vega
United States & Oceania
11 January 2011	New York City	United States	Bowery Ballroom
13 January 2011	West Hollywood	United States	The Troubadour
21 January 2011	Auckland	New Zealand	Mount Smart Stadium^{[U]}
23 January 2011	Gold Coast	Australia	Gold Coast Parklands^{[U]}
24 January 2011	Sydney	Australia	The Metro Theatre
26 January 2011	Sydney	Australia	Sydney Showground^{[U]}
27 January 2011	Sydney	Australia	Sydney Showground^{[U]}
30 January 2011	Melbourne	Australia	Flemington Racecourse^{[U]}
1 February 2011	Melbourne	Australia	The Prince Bandroom
4 February 2011	Adelaide	Australia	Adelaide Showgrounds
6 February 2011	Perth	Australia	Claremont Showground^{[U]}
Leg 6: United Kingdom & Ireland
19 February 2010	Ljubljana	Slovenia	Kino Šiška
27 February 2011	Dublin	Ireland	Olympia Theatre
28 February 2011	Dublin	Ireland	Olympia Theatre
2 March 2011	Manchester	United Kingdom	O2 Apollo Manchester
3 March 2011	Wolverhampton	United Kingdom	Wolverhampton Civic Hall
4 March 2011	Blackpool	United Kingdom	Empress Ballroom
5 March 2011	Doncaster	United Kingdom	The Dome Leisure Centre
7 March 2011	Swindon	United Kingdom	Oasis Leisure Centre
8 March 2011	Plymouth	United Kingdom	Plymouth Pavilions
9 March 2011	Brighton	United Kingdom	Brighton Centre
10 March 2011	London	United Kingdom	The O2 Arena
United States
17 April 2011	Indio	United States	Empire Polo Fields^{[V]}
19 April 2011	Los Angeles	United States	El Rey Theatre
21 April 2011	San Francisco	United States	Rickshaw Stop
23 April 2011	Seattle	United States	Chop Suey
24 April 2011	Portland	United States	McMenamins Lola's Room
26 April 2011	Salt Lake City	United States	The Urban Lounge
4 May 2011	New York City	United States	Roseland Ballroom^{[W]}
5 May 2011	New York City	United States	Music Hall of Williamsburg
7 May 2011	Boston	United States	Agganis Arena^{[W]}
8 May 2011	Camden	United States	Susquehanna Bank Center^{[W]}
10 May 2011	Atlanta	United States	Fox Theatre^{[W]}
11 May 2011	Miami Beach	United States	The Fillmore Miami Beach^{[W]}
14 May 2011	Carlisle	United Kingdom	Carlisle Airport^{[C]}
21 May 2011	New York City	United States	United Palace^{[X]}
23 May 2011	Royal Oak	United States	Royal Oak Music Theatre^{[X]}
24 May 2011	Chicago	United States	Riviera Theatre^{[X]}
26 May 2011	Minneapolis	United States	First Avenue^{[X]}
Europe (festivals)
29 May 2011	Newcastle	United Kingdom	Spiller's Wharf^{[Y]}
31 May 2011	Magaluf	Spain	Mallorca Rocks Hotel^{[Z]}
1 June 2011	Ibiza	Spain	Ibiza Rocks Hotel^{[Z]}
10 June 2011	Crans-près-Céligny	Switzerland	Crans-près-Céligny^{[AA]}
12 June 2011	Newport	United Kingdom	Seaclose Park^{[BB]}
18 June 2011	Warsaw	Poland	Polish Army Stadium^{[CC]}
26 June 2011	Pilton	United Kingdom	Worthy Farm^{[E]}
1 July 2011	London	United Kingdom	Hyde Park^{[DD]}
8 July 2011	Balado	United Kingdom	Balado^{[EE]}
10 July 2011	Naas	Ireland	Punchestown Racecourse^{[G]}
14 July 2011	Benicàssim	Spain	Benicàssim^{[FF]}
13 August 2011	Buftea	Romania	Domeniul Stirbey^{[II]}
20 August 2011	Chelmsford	United Kingdom	Hylands Park^{[P]}
21 August 2011	Staffordshire	United Kingdom	Weston Park^{[P]}
25 August 2011	Belfast	United Kingdom	Custom House Square^{[JJ]}
4 September 2011	Jersey	United Kingdom	The Royal Jersey Showground^{[KK]}

=== Notes ===
Festivals and other miscellaneous performances

^{[A]} Supporting Noel Gallagher
^{[B]} As part of Camden Crawl
^{[C]} As part of Radio 1's Big Weekend
^{[D]} As part of RockNess
^{[E]} As part of Glastonbury Festival
^{[F]} As part of Wakestock
^{[G]} As part of Oxegen
^{[H]} As part of T4 on the Beach
^{[I]} As part of NASS Festival
^{[J]} As part of iTunes Festival
^{[K]} Charity concert for War Child
^{[L]} As part of Paredes de Coura Festival
^{[M]} As part of Boardmasters Festival
^{[N]} As part of The Big Chill
^{[O]} As part of The Edge Festival
^{[P]} As part of V Festival
^{[Q]} As part of Rock en Seine
^{[R]} Charity concert for Help for Heroes
^{[S]} Charity concert for Party for Pakistan
^{[T]} Supporting Elton John
^{[U]} As part of Big Day Out
^{[V]} As part of Coachella Festival
^{[W]} Supporting Bruno Mars and Janelle Monáe
^{[X]} Supporting Adele
^{[Y]} As part of Evolution Festival
^{[Z]} As part of Majorca Rocks & Ibiza Rocks
^{[AA]} As part of Caribana Festival
^{[BB]} As part of Isle of Wight Festival
^{[CC]} As part of Orange Warsaw Festival
^{[DD]} As part of Wireless Festival
^{[EE]} As part of T in the Park
^{[FF]} As part of Benicàssim Festival
^{[GG]} As part of Stirbey Festival
^{[HH]} As part of Belsonic
^{[II]} As part of Jersey Live

Cancellations and rescheduled shows

16–18 April 2010	Skegness, United Kingdom	Butlins Skegness	Playaway Festival cancelled due to unforeseen circumstances
4–5 September 2010	Jersey, United Kingdom	The Royal Jersey Showground	Jersey Live appearance rescheduled to 2011 due to filming of Ill Manors
23 November 2010	Milan, Italy	Magazzini Generali	Cancelled due to illness
16 July 2011	Bern, Switzerland	Gurten	Gurtenfestival appearance cancelled due to illness
17 July 2011	Gräfenhainichen, Germany	Ferropolis	Melt! Festival appearance cancelled due to illness
