= Routine Check =

2005 single by The Mitchell Brothers

Single by The Mitchell Brothers featuring Kano and The Streets

from the album A Breath of Fresh Attire
- B-side: "Routine Check (Instrumental)"
- Released: March 2005
- Genre: Hip-hop
- Length: 4:21
- Label: The Beats Recordings
- Songwriter: Mike Skinner
- Producer: Mike Skinner

"Routine Check" is the debut single by British hip hop duo the Mitchell Brothers, featuring Kano and the Streets. It was their highest-charting single, peaking at No. 42 on the UK Singles Chart in March 2005.

== Theme ==
The song is a defiant response to the perceived racism of the UK Police's "stop and search" policy.

In 2012, Tony Mitchell said that the song summed him up as an artist and that the song was about a real situation in that many youngsters had to deal with such police interactions. He said that he wanted people "to like it, for them to like the funny side of it, but understand the seriousness of it as well. At that time with a lot of artists it was cool to be macho, but bringing that wit and humour for me was important."

== Critical reception ==
Critical reception was mixed. John Murphy of musicOMH said the song was "the Mitchells at their most incendiary", arguing that the song could potentially be the British version of NWA's "Fuck tha Police" and that "a whole generation of black youths" would be able to identify with it. About the featured artists on the song, he commented: "The appearance of both Mike Skinner and Grime's latest rising star Kano gives the track added prestige." Hattie Collins of The Guardian felt that the Mitchells' contribution to the track was inferior to Kano's contribution: "their flat flow, perhaps meant to lend a more authentic feel, serves only to make them all the more monotonous".

== Aftermath ==
In an interview with Music Week, Robbie Williams revealed that he had played the song "to death", and as a result was inspired to record "Dickhead", a hidden track on his ninth studio album, Rudebox.
