= Against All Odds (Chase & Status song) =

Single by Chase & Status featuring Kano

from the album More Than Alot
- B-side: "Saxon"
- Released: 23 February 2009
- Recorded: 2008
- Length: 2:41
- Label: RAM
- Songwriters: Saul Milton; Will Kennard; Kane Robinson; David Axelrod; Ben Raleigh
- Producers: Chase & Status

Chase & Status singles chronology
"Pieces" (2008)	"Against All Odds" (2009)	"End Credits" (2009)

Kano singles chronology
"Stryderman" (2008)	"Against All Odds" (2009)	"Rock N Roller" (2009)

Music video
- "Against All Odds" on YouTube

"Saxon" cover

"Against All Odds" is a collaborative single, recorded by British musicians and production team Chase & Status featuring vocals from British rapper Kano. The single was released on 23 February 2009 as the second single from Chase & Status' debut studio album, More Than Alot. "Against All Odds" contains samples from the 1967 song "Dead End Street" by Lou Rawls and a drum sample from "Apache" by Incredible Bongo Band. The music video for the track features Kano and Chase & Status in an underground nightclub in London.

"Against All Odds" was released as a double A-side single with the instrumental track "Saxon", which later went on to appear in the deluxe edition of More Than Alot. "Saxon" is a reggae-inspired dubstep song, as well as one of the few dubstep songs in the drum and bass album. Ironically, the instrumental contains heavy elements of the Metallica song "Wherever I May Roam", giving it its dark sound. The song also takes various vocal samples from the 1984 live project Coughing Up Fire!!!. The track's title refers to Saxon Studio International, the reggae sound system (group of MCs) being sampled from the project. "Saxon" is also the instrumental used in the Rihanna song "Red Lipstick" from the deluxe edition of her 2011 album Talk That Talk.

== Track listing ==
CD single
No.	Title	Writer(s)	Length
1.	"Against All Odds"	Will Kennard; Saul Milton; Kane Robinson; David Axelrod; Ben Raleigh	2:41
2.	"Against All Odds" (Xample remix)	Kennard; Milton; Robinson; Axelrod; Raleigh	5:03
3.	"Against All Odds" (Dave Spoon remix)	Kennard; Milton; Robinson; Axelrod; Raleigh	4:37
4.	"Against All Odds" (dubstep remix)	Kennard; Milton; Robinson; Axelrod; Raleigh	3:22
5.	"Saxon"	Kennard; Milton	4:57

12" single number one
No.	Title	Writer(s)	Length
1.	"Against All Odds"	Kennard; Milton; Robinson; Axelrod; Raleigh	2:41
2.	"Saxon"	Kennard; Milton	4:57

12" single number two
No.	Title	Writer(s)	Length
1.	"Against All Odds" (Xample remix)	Kennard; Milton; Robinson; Axelrod; Raleigh	5:03
2.	"Against All Odds" (dubstep remix)	Kennard; Milton; Robinson; Axelrod; Raleigh	3:22

== Personnel ==
- Saul Milton – producer
- Will Kennard – producer
- Kano – vocals
- Mitchy Boy – artwork

== Chart performance ==
Chart (2008)	Peak position
UK Dance (Official Charts)	11
UK Singles (Official Charts)	45
UK Indie (Official Charts)	1

== Release history ==
Region	Date	Format	Label	Catalogue
United Kingdom	23 February 2009	12"; CD; digital download	RAM	B001PSQGP4
