= Deepest Shame =

Single by Plan B

from the album Ill Manors
- Released: 9 September 2012
- Recorded: 2011
- Genre: Hip hop; soul
- Length: 3:37
- Label: 679; Atlantic
- Songwriter(s): Ben Drew; Al Shuckburgh
- Producer(s): Al Shux; Plan B; Eric Appapoulay (add.)

Plan B singles chronology
"Lost My Way" (2012)	"Deepest Shame" (2012)	"Playing With Fire" (2012)

"Deepest Shame" is a hip-hop song composed and performed by British rapper Plan B. The track was released in the United Kingdom on 9 September 2012 as the third official single from the ill Manors soundtrack, a film which Plan B also directed. The track was originally composed as a freestyle rap, entitled "Michelle", and later reworked into a soul number for inclusion in Ill Manors.

== Composition ==
"Deepest Shame" was first composed as a freestyle rap entitled "Michelle". The track was first used in Ben Drew's 2008 short film Michelle, and this version features beatboxer Faith SFX. The version of "Michelle" that was used in ill Manors has some elements similar to "Deepest Shame"; however, for the album release, the song was re-written as more of a soul number, although "Michelle" is included on the deluxe edition bonus disc. "Michelle" was originally a freestyle rap, featuring an extended rap verse and no "Deepest Shame" chorus. However, in the final version, the extension of the verse was taken out, replaced by a new first verse which is sung, rather than rapped, and some lyrics of the original rap were modified for radio use.

== Release ==
The song was premiered on Later... with Jools Holland on 11 May 2012. The Andy C remix of the track, which serves as the official single remix, was uploaded to UKF Drum & Bass on 2 September 2012. The Cinematic remix received its worldwide premiere on MistaJam's BBC Radio 1Xtra show on the same day. An iTunes Store pre-order link confirmed the final track listing of the digital single, and in a similar format to the ill Manors EP, contains three remixes, an a cappella version and an instrumental. The EP was originally scheduled to be released on 2 September 2012 but its release was delayed by a week to 9 September 2012. The New Machine remix, featuring a combination of Ed Sheeran's chorus, the original album version, alongside new rap verses from Chip and Devlin, premiered on YouTube on 8 September 2012.

== Music video ==
The music video for "Deepest Shame" was directed by Paul Caslin, and premiered on YouTube on 6 August 2012. The video shows footage of Drew performing the song in a dimly lit room in a derelict warehouse, intertwined with clips from ill Manors, featuring the character Michelle, played by Anouska Mond. Newly filmed footage of Mond as Michelle, nude, within the basement of the building, with writing on her body, is also featured in the video.

== Track listing ==
Digital download – EP
No.	Title	Length
1.	"Deepest Shame" (Andy C Remix)	5:03
2.	"Deepest Shame" (Instrumental)	3:38
3.	"Deepest Shame" (A Capella)	3:29
4.	"Deepest Shame" (New Machine Remix) (featuring Ed Sheeran, Chip and Devlin)	4:07
5.	"Deepest Shame" (Cinematic Remix)	4:35

CD single
No.	Title	Length
1.	"Deepest Shame"	3:37

== Charts ==
Chart (2012)	Peak position
UK Singles (OCC)	27

== Personnel ==
- Plan B – vocals, producer
- Al Shux – producer, mixing
- Eric Appapoulay – additional producer, mixing
- Jimmy Robertson – engineer, mixing
- Al O'Connell – engineer
- John Davis – mastering
