= Heaven Before All Hell Breaks Loose =

Studio album by Plan B
- Released: 4 May 2018
- Recorded: 2017–2018
- Studio: The Sanctuary, Miloco Studios (London, England)
- Label: Atlantic; 679
- Producer: Ben Drew; Fred; Show N Prove; Dom Search; Al Shux; Jonny Coffer; Wez Clarke; The Nextmen; Mark Ralph; New Machine; Austen Jux-Chandler

Plan B chronology
| Ill Manors (2012) | Heaven Before All Hell Breaks Loose (2018) |

Singles from Heaven Before All Hell Breaks Loose
- 1. "Heartbeat" Released: 27 October 2017; 2. "Guess Again" Released: 9 March 2018; 3. "Queue Jumping" Released: 30 March 2018; 4. "Grateful" Released: 6 April 2018; 5. "It's a War" Released: 13 April 2018; 6. "Stranger" Released: 20 April 2018; 7. "Mercy" Released: 27 April 2018; 8. "Wait So Long (Cadenza Remix)" Released: 5 October 2018

Heaven Before All Hell Breaks Loose is the third studio album by English singer and rapper Plan B. It was released on 4 May 2018 by Atlantic Records and 679 Artists.

== Track listing ==
Adapted from iTunes.

| No. | Title | Writer(s) | Producer(s) | Length |
|---|---|---|---|---|
| 1. | "Grateful" | Benjamin Drew; Dominic Betmead; Thomas Hull; Ellis Taylor | Plan B; Dom Search; Show N Prove; Mark Ralph^{[a]}; New Machine^{[a]}; Austen Jux-Chandler^{[a]} | 3:37 |
| 2. | "Stranger" | Drew; Foy Vance; Thomas Wright-Goss | Plan B; Dom Search^{[a]}; Show N Prove^{[a]} | 3:37 |
| 3. | "Heartbeat" | Drew; Alexander Shuckburgh; Kwabena Adjepong | Plan B; Al Shux; Search^{[a]}; Show N Prove^{[a]} | 3:49 |
| 4. | "Queue Jumping" | Drew; Eric Appapoulay; Jonathan Coffer; Dean McIntosh | Plan B; Jonny Coffer; Search^{[a]}; Show N Prove^{[a]} | 3:21 |
| 5. | "Wait So Long" | Drew; Frederick Gibson | Plan B; Fred | 3:38 |
| 6. | "Pushin'" | Drew; Betmead; Taylor; Keiron McIntosh; Obenowa Aboah; Wright-Goss | Plan B; Fred | 3:57 |
| 7. | "Heaven Before All Hell Breaks Loose" | Drew; Betmead; Taylor; Wright-Goss | Plan B; Fred | 4:13 |
| 8. | "It's a War" | Drew; Taylor; Wright-Goss | Plan B; Fred | 3:01 |
| 9. | "Guess Again" | Drew; Appapoulay; Taylor; Gibson | Plan B; Fred; Show N Prove; Search^{[a]}; Wez Clarke^{[a]} | 3:30 |
| 10. | "Flesh & Bone" | Drew; Betmead; K. McIntosh; Robert MacFarlane | Plan B; Fred | 3:55 |
| 11. | "Pursuit of Happiness" | Drew; Betmead; Taylor; K. McIntosh; Wright-Goss | Plan B; Fred | 3:54 |
| 12. | "Mercy" | Drew; Betmead; Taylor | Plan B; Fred | 4:27 |
| 13. | "Deeper" | Drew; Appapoulay; Taylor; D. McIntosh; Harry Craze; Hugo Chegwin | Plan B; Fred | 4:01 |
| 14. | "Sepia" | Drew; Ajay Bhattacharyya; Jonathan Hill; Francis White | Plan B; Fred | 4:27 |

== Charts ==
| Chart (2018) | Peak position |
|---|---|
| Scottish Albums (OCC) | 5 |
| UK Albums (OCC) | 5 |
| UK R&B Albums (OCC) | 1 |
