= Hard Times (Plan B song) =

Single by Plan B featuring Elton John and Paloma Faith

from the album The Defamation of Strickland Banks
- Released: 19 May 2011
- Recorded: April 2011
- Genre: Soul; pop
- Length: 4:05
- Label: Atlantic
- Songwriter(s): Ben Drew
- Producer(s): Ben Drew; David McEwan; Eric Appapoulay (add.)

Plan B singles chronology
"Writing's on the Wall" (2011)	"Hard Times" (2011)	"Ill Manors" (2012)

Elton John singles chronology
"If It Wasn't for Bad" (2010)	"Hard Times" (2011)	"Good Morning to the Night" (2012)

Paloma Faith singles chronology
"Smoke & Mirrors" (2010)	"Hard Times" (2011)	"Picking Up the Pieces" (2012)

"Hard Times" is the seventh single from British rapper and songwriter Plan B's second studio album, The Defamation of Strickland Banks. On 19 May 2011, it was released as a digital download, featuring newly recorded vocal parts by Elton John and Paloma Faith, recorded as a charity single with all the proceeds benefiting victims of the 2010 Pakistan floods and 2011 Tōhoku earthquake and tsunami. The song was used by Sky Sports in the build up to Crystal Palace vs West Bromwich Albion in April 2010.

== Track listing ==
- Digital download
1. "Hard Times" (featuring Elton John & Paloma Faith) – 4:05
- Promotional CD single
1. "Hard Times" (featuring Elton John & Paloma Faith) – 4:05
2. "Hard Times" (Live) (featuring Elton John & Paloma Faith) – 5:44
3. "Hard Times" (Edit) – 3:48

== Personnel ==
- Plan B – vocals, producer

Production

- David McEwan – producer
- Eric Appapoulay – additional producer
- Mark "Top" Rankin – engineer, mixing

Additional musicians (single version)

- Elton John – piano, vocals
- Paloma Faith – vocals

Additional musicians (album version)

- Tom Wright-Goss – guitar
- Eric Appapoulay – bass, backing vocals
- Richard Cassell – drums
- Everton Newson – violin
- Louisa Fuller – violin
- Sally Herbert – violin
- Warren Zielinski – violin
- Bruce White – viola
- Sonia Slany – viola
- Ian Burdge – cello

== Chart performance ==
Chart (2011)	Peak position
UK Singles (The Official Charts Company)	147

== Release history ==
Region	Date	Label	Format
United Kingdom	19 May 2011	Atlantic	Digital download
