= More than Alot =

Studio album by Chase & Status
- Released: 13 October 2008
- Recorded: 2006–08
- Genre: Drum and bass; breakbeat; dubstep; hip-hop
- Length: 48:40
- Label: RAM
- Producer: Chase & Status

Chase & Status chronology
Bingo Beats Vol. 6 (2006)	More than Alot (2008)	No More Idols (2011)

Singles from More than Alot
- 1. "Hurt You" Released: 12 October 2007; 2. "Take Me Away" Released: 25 July 2008; 3. "Pieces" / "Eastern Jam" Released: 29 September 2008; 4. "Against All Odds" / "Saxon" Released: 23 February 2009

Professional ratings
Review scores
Source	Rating
AllMusic	4/5 stars
Drowned in Sound	9/10
Sputnikmusic	4.0/5

More than Alot is the debut studio album by English electronic music duo Chase & Status. The album was released on 13 October 2008, and peaked at number 49 on the UK Albums Chart. The album was re-released on 4 June 2010 with bonus tracks as the "New edition".

== Background ==
The album debuted on the UK Albums Chart at number 49 on 19 October 2008, and entered the UK Dance Albums Chart at number two on the same week. The album was preceded by the release of the lead single, "Pieces" featuring vocals from rapper Plan B, on 29 September. On 5 October, "Pieces" peaked at number 70 on the UK Singles Chart and at number one on the UK Dance Chart. The album also includes a collaboration with British garage rapper Kano on "Against All Odds", which was later released as the album's second single. The track received considerable play time on the club scene throughout 2008. While the album maintains the duo's drum and bass roots, two tracks – "Eastern Jam" and "Running" – display the duo's ability to produce dubstep tracks with commercial success. "Eastern Jam" was later remixed to become a collaboration, featuring vocals from hip hop artist Snoop Dogg, culminating in the single "Snoop Dogg Millionaire". On 4 July 2010, the album was re-released, with the addition of three new songs and a special tour video. The extra tracks included "Saxon", "Heartbeat" and "In Love". The album later went on to win the Best Album Award at the 2009 drum and bass awards.

== Singles ==
- "Hurt You", backed by the non-album track "Sell Me Your Soul", was released on 12 October 2007 primarily on vinyl. It peaked at number one on the UK Dance Chart but failed to enter the singles chart. It features uncredited vocals from Yolanda Quartey, as does the following single "Take Me Away".
- "Take Me Away", backed by the non-album track "Judgement (Informer)", was released on 25 July 2008 primarily on vinyl. It also peaked at number one on the UK Dance Chart but failed to enter the singles chart.
- "Pieces" / "Eastern Jam" was released on 29 September 2008, as the lead single from the album. "Pieces" served as the A-side, while "Eastern Jam" appeared as the AA-side. "Pieces" features guest vocals from British musician Plan B. The single managed to peak at number 70 on the UK Singles Chart.
- "Against All Odds" / "Saxon" was released on 23 February 2009 as the fourth and final single from the album. "Against All Odds" served as the A-side, while "Saxon" appeared as the AA-side. "Against All Odds" features vocals from British rapper Kano. The single peaked at number 45 on the UK Singles Chart.

=== Other singles ===
- The VIP mix for the tracks "End Credits" and "Is It Worth It" was released as a single on 16 November 2009 in the UK by RAM Records. "Is It Worth It VIP" served as the AA-side to "End Credits VIP".

== Track listing ==
All tracks are written by Will Kennard and Saul Milton.

No.	Title	Writer(s)	Length
1.	"Can't Get Enough"	Takura Tendayi	3:27
2.	"Music Club"		3:43
3.	"Against All Odds" (featuring Kano)	Kane Robinson; David Axelrod; Ben Raleigh	2:42
4.	"Streetlife" (featuring Takura)	Tendayi	4:18
5.	"Smash TV"		3:40
6.	"Pieces" (featuring Plan B)	Ben Drew	4:49
7.	"Eastern Jam"		3:59
8.	"Foundation Skit"		0:54
9.	"Take Me Away"		4:27
10.	"Hurt You"		3:47
11.	"Running"	Tendayi	4:48
12.	"Take U There" (featuring Digga)		3:12
13.	"Is It Worth It"	Tendayi	4:57
Total length:			48:40

New edition bonus tracks
No.	Title	Writer(s)	Length
14.	"Saxon"		4:57
15.	"Heartbeat" (C&S Mix)	Nneka Egbuna; Farhad Samadzada	3:56
16.	"In Love" (featuring Jenna G)	Jenna Gibbons; James Davis	5:55
17.	"More than a Lot: Tour EPK" (bonus video)		4:03

Japanese edition bonus tracks
No.	Title	Length
14.	"Against All Odds" (featuring Kano) (Xample remix)	5:03
15.	"Saxon"	4:57
16.	"Judgement"	4:18
17.	"Brazil"	3:28
18.	"Against All Odds" (featuring Kano) (bonus video)	3:07

Sample credits

- "Against All Odds" samples "Dead End Street" by Lou Rawls and "Apache" by Incredible Bongo Band
- "Smash TV" samples "Welcome to the Jungle (live)" by Guns N' Roses
- "Eastern Jam" samples "Silsila Ye Chaahat Ka" by Shreya Ghoshal, Ismail Darbar and Nusrat Badr
- "Take Me Away" samples "Ride on Time" by Black Box and interpolates "Love Sensation" by Loleatta Holloway
- "Running" samples "Yah Mo B There" by James Ingram and Michael McDonald
- "Saxon" samples "Wherever I May Roam" by Metallica

== Personnel ==
Chase & Status

- Will Kennard – producer
- Saul Milton – producer

Technical production

- Stuart Hawkes – mastering

Additional musicians

- Anthony "Digga" McLean – vocals (12)
- Five O – vocals (8)
- Jenna G – vocals (16)
- Kano – vocals (3)
- Nneka – vocals (15)
- Plan B – vocals (6)
- Yolanda Quartey – vocals (9, 10)
- Takura Tendayi – vocals (1, 4, 11, 13)
- Example – vocals (2)

== Chart performance ==
Chart (2008)	Peak position
UK Albums Chart	49
UK Dance Chart	2

== Certifications ==
Region	Certification	Certified units/sales
United Kingdom (BPI)	Silver	60,000^{‡}
^{‡} Sales+streaming figures based on certification alone.

== Release history ==
Region	Date	Label	Format	Catalog
United Kingdom	13 October 2008	RAM	Standard edition	RAMMLP12CD
United Kingdom	4 June 2010	Vertigo; RAM	New edition	87454828910
