= Mama (Loves a Crackhead) =

Single by Plan B

from the album Who Needs Actions When You Got Words
- Released: 10 July 2006
- Recorded: 2005
- Genre: Hip hop
- Length: 3:57
- Label: 679
- Songwriters: Ben Drew, Daryl Hall, John Oates, Sara Allen
- Producers: Plan B, Jonathan Quarmby (add.), Kevin Bacon (add.)

Plan B singles chronology
"Missing Links" (2006)	"Mama (Loves a Crackhead)" (2006)	"No More Eatin'" (2006)

"Mama (Loves a Crackhead)" is the fourth single by British rapper and songwriter Plan B, taken from his debut album Who Needs Actions When You Got Words, which was released two weeks prior to the single. "Mama (Loves a Crackhead)" was the first single to be entirely produced by Plan B himself. "Mama" was released on 10 July 2006, and it just missed out on a UK Top 40 placing, peaking at #41. The song "tells the sad story of his mother's relationship with a crack addict". The music video for "Mama (Loves a Crackhead)" was directed by Dawn Shadforth. The song samples "I Can't Go for That (No Can Do)" by Hall & Oates and a remix version featuring Hall & Oates is also featured on his Paint It Blacker mixtape.

== Track listing ==
- CD single
1. "Mama (Loves a Crackhead)" (Radio Version) – 3:59
2. "Sick 2 Def" (The Early Version) (featuring The Earlies) – 3:34
- DVD single
1. "Mama (Loves a Crackhead)" (Music Video) – 4:30
2. "Mama (Loves a Crackhead)" (Making of the Video) - 3:00
- 7" vinyl
1. "Mama (Loves a Crackhead)" (Radio Version) – 3:59
- Digital download
1. "Mama (Loves a Crackhead)" (Radio Version) – 3:59
2. "Sick 2 Def" (The Early Version) (featuring The Earlies) – 3:34
3. "Mama (Loves a Crackhead)" (Acoustic Version) – 4:13
4. "Mama (Loves a Crackhead)" (Live Version) – 4:19

== Personnel ==
- Plan B – vocals, producer

Production

- Jonathan Quarmby – co-producer, mixing
- Kevin Bacon – co-producer, mixing
- Finn Eiles – engineer
- Jimmy Robertson – engineer

Additional musicians

- Andrew Smith – guitar
- Andy Sheldrake – bass
- Cassell the Beatmaker – drums
- Harry Escott – cello

== Chart performance ==
Chart (2006)	Peak position
UK Singles (Official Charts)	41

== Release history ==
Country	Date	Format	Label
United Kingdom	July 10, 2006	CD single, DVD single, 7" vinyl, Digital download	679 Recordings
