= Lost My Way =

Single by Plan B

from the album Ill Manors
- Released: 2 July 2012
- Recorded: 2011
- Genre: Hip hop
- Length: 3:38
- Label: 679, Atlantic
- Songwriters: Ben Drew, Al Shuckburgh
- Producers: Al Shux, Plan B

Plan B singles chronology
"ill Manors" (2012)	"Lost My Way" (2012)	"Deepest Shame" (2012)

"Lost My Way" is a hip hop song performed by English singer-songwriter Plan B. The track was released in the United Kingdom on 2 July 2012 as the second promotional single from the Ill Manors soundtrack, a film which Plan B also directed. A remix of the track features vocals from American rapper Raekwon.

== Release ==
The song was first played by Zane Lowe on BBC Radio 1 on 23 May 2012. The same night, a lyric video for the track premiered on YouTube. On 20 June 2012, the track was available for download for free via iTunes with the pre-order of the deluxe edition of the III Manors album. On the same day, a remix of the track featuring American rapper Raekwon premiered on YouTube.

== Reception ==
Digital Spy gave the track four out of five stars, stating "Wherever there is political controversy these days, you can bet Plan B isn't far behind. For those still in the dark about his latest project, the singer, rapper, actor and director has depicted a particularly shocking side to life on London's gangs and forgotten estates for his new film iLL Manors. Fittingly, he's written an album's worth of material to soundtrack the flick. 'Lost My Way' combines soul for those who enjoyed his previous Strickland Banks LP with the gritty rapping style that fans who better know him as Ben Drew will already be familiar with. "Lost my way, Fell down a hole, No-one gonna come and save my soul," he spits with a sharp tongue over pummelling drums and a twisted piano hook. The result, as you'd expect, is brutally dark yet utterly compelling."

== Music video ==
The video for the track premiered on 13 July 2012, at a total length of four minutes and six seconds. The video shows footage of Drew's recent Forest Tour, intertwined with footage from Ill Manors. The video uses a slightly alternative version of the track, which combines elements of both the album version and the radio edit.

== Track listing ==
- Promotional CD single
1. "Lost My Way" (Radio Edit) – 3:38
2. "Lost My Way" (Album Version) – 4:17
3. "Lost My Way" (Raekwon Remix) – 3:38
4. "Lost My Way" (Nu:Tone Remix) – 5:57
5. "Lost My Way" (Instrumental) – 4:17

== Personnel ==
- Plan B – vocals, producer, mixing

Production

- Al Shux – producer, additional keyboards, guitar, bass
- John Davis – mastering

Additional musicians

- Christiana Kayode – backing vocals
- Obenewa Aboah – backing vocals
- Tom Wright-Goss – guitar
- Jean-Marie Brichard – bass
- Kieron McIntosh – keyboards
- Cassell the Beatmaker – drums

== Chart performance ==
Chart (2012)	Peak position
UK Singles (Official Charts Company)	121
UK Hip Hop/R&B (OCC)	29
