= Run the Road =

Compilation album series

Run the Road Vol. 1

Compilation album by Various
- Released: January 24, 2005
- Recorded: 2004–2005
- Genre: Grime
- Label: 679 Recordings

Alternative album cover
- This edition was released on March 8, 2005

Run the Road is a series of compilations released on 679 Recordings and Vice. It was intended to showcase a wide variety of grime artists from the genre such as Dizzee Rascal, Wiley and Kano.

It was reviewed in The New York Times as well as the British mainstream media, and was celebrated with a live show at Rothko nightclub in New York with D Double E, Ears and Jammer performing. According to RWD Magazine deputy editor Danny Walker, the first edition sold more than 20,000 copies.

== Run the Road Vol. 1 ==
1. Terror Danjah feat. Riko, Bruza, D Double E and Hyper - Cock Back
2. Riko and Target - Chosen One
3. Roll Deep - Let It Out
4. Kano - P's and Q's
5. Jammer feat. Wiley, D Double E, Kano and Goodz - Destruction Vip
6. Dizzee Rascal feat. D Double E - Give U More
7. No Lay - Unorthodox Daughter
8. Shystie feat. Ronnie Redz, Kano and Bruza - One Wish (Terror Remix)
9. Durrty Goodz - Gimmie Dat
10. Demon feat. Big E D - I Wont Change
11. Tinchy Stryder - Move
12. Lady Sovereign - Cha Ching (Cheq 1-2 Remix)
13. Ears - Happy Days
14. The Streets Ft. Kano, Donae'o, Lady Sovereign and Tinchy Stryder - Fit But You Know It
15. Wonder feat. Plan B - Cap Black
16. Kano feat. Demon And Wiley - Mic Fight

Run the Road Vol.2

Compilation album by Various
- Released: February 7, 2006
- Recorded: 2005–2006
- Genre: Grime
- Label: Vice

== Run the Road Vol. 2 ==
Disc 1

1. Big Seac, Demon, Doctor, Ghetto, Kano, Low Deep - Get Set [Run the Road Edition]
2. DaVinChe, Doctor - Gotta Man?
3. JME - Serious [Run the Road Remix]
4. Big Seac - Nah, Nah
5. Bigz, Bruza, Pyrelli, Skinnyman, Sway, Triple Threat - Up Your Speed [Remix]
6. Ghetto, Katie Pearl - Run the Road
7. Plan B - Sick 2 Def [Acoustic]
8. Demon, Ghetto, Kano - Mic Check [Remix]
9. Lady Sov - Little Bit Of Shuush [DJ Wonder Remix]
10. Crazy Titch - Word Is Crazy
11. Joe Buhdha, Klashnekoff - Can't You See?
12. Earz, JME, Jammer, Mizz Beats, Sier, Wiley - Saw It Comin'
13. Trimbal - They Gave an Inch
14. No Lay - Unorthodox Chick
15. Bear Man, Doctor, Fender - Drink Bear [Remix]
16. Dynasty Crew - Bare Face Dynasty

Disc 2

1. Kano - P's and Q's [DVD] [Multimedia Track]
2. Bear Man - Drinking Beer [DVD] [Multimedia Track]
3. Bruza, D Double E, Demon, Kano - Streets [Get Out of My House MC Version] [DVD] [Multimedia Track]
4. Who's That Boy [DVD] [Multimedia Track]
5. Bonus Material [DVD]

== Critical reception ==
The first edition was reviewed positively in broadsheet newspapers at the time of its release. Writing for the Evening Standard, Richard Godwin described it as an "exhilarating introduction" to grime and asserting that "[t]he compilation format showcases the genre's versatility well, while providing great individual moments". However, he noted that several of the tracks included were more than a year old at the time of its release. For The Daily Telegraph, Ben Thompson wrote that the compilation was "a perfect introduction to the raft of likely contenders now hoping to follow Dizzee Rascal into the mainstream", and described the content as "[u]rgent, funny, rude, and sometimes [...] alarmingly violent."
