= Dressed for the Occasion (The Mitchell Brothers album) =

Studio album by The Mitchell Brothers
- Released: 19 November 2007
- Recorded: 2006–07
- Genre: Hip hop, UK garage
- Label: The Beats
- Producer: Gabriel Armah, Elleclectick, Calvin Harris, "Magic" Mike Millrain, Sem, Mike Skinner, Urban Monk

The Mitchell Brothers chronology
A Breath of Fresh Attire (2005)	Dressed for the Occasion (2007)

Dressed for the Occasion is the second studio album by English hip hop duo The Mitchell Brothers, released on 19 November 2007.

Production comes mostly from The Beats owner and The Streets frontman Mike Skinner. Guests on the album include Calvin Harris, Franz Ferdinand, Ghetto and Plan B.

The album was originally set for a July release, but due to creative differences and competition from huge hip hop stars such as 50 Cent and Kanye West, November was "pencilled in".

"Solemate" was released as a 12" single on 14 May 2007. "Michael Jackson" was released as a single on 15 October 2007.

== Track listing ==
1. "Solemate"
2. "Michael Jackson" (featuring Calvin Harris)
3. "Action Hero"
4. "Bestest Man"
5. "Gate Crasher"
6. "Postcard"
7. "Ratings"
8. "Reservoir Drugs" (featuring Professor Green)
9. "Shots Echo" (featuring Plan B and Ghetto)
10. "Cats and Dogs"
11. "Slap My Face" (featuring Franz Ferdinand)
