= Pupil Referral Unit =

Alternative education provision in the UK

In England, a Pupil Referral Unit (PRU) (previously known as Pupil Re-integration Unit by some Local Education Authorities) is an alternative education provision which is specifically organised to provide education for children who are not able to attend school for a number of reasons.

Reasons for referral might include:

- Neurodivergent learning styles which make it challenging for the pupil to engage in mainstream school;
- A pupil having a short- or long-term illness, including mental health illness;
- Anxiety or school phobias (which may have been triggered by bullying) preventing the pupil from comfortably attending school;
- Behavioural issues that have led to other pupils being disrupted in school;
- A child waiting for a mainstream school placement to become available.

Each LEA has a duty under section 19 of the Education Act 1996 to provide suitable education for children of compulsory school age who cannot attend school. Placing pupils in PRUs is just one of the ways in which local authorities can ensure that they can comply with this duty. PRUs are a mixture of public units and privately managed companies.

There are currently over 421 PRUs in England. Between 2002 and 2003, 17,523 pupils attended PRUs at some point. Although PRUs do not have to provide a full National Curriculum, they should offer a basic curriculum which includes English, mathematics, the sciences, PSHE and ICT.

A PRU is treated the same as any other type of school, subject to the same inspections from Ofsted. Since September 2010, some PRUs are referred to as "Short Stay Schools", although the government still broadly refer to them as PRUs or Alternative Provision (APs).
