= Plan B (musician) =

British musician and actor (born 1983)

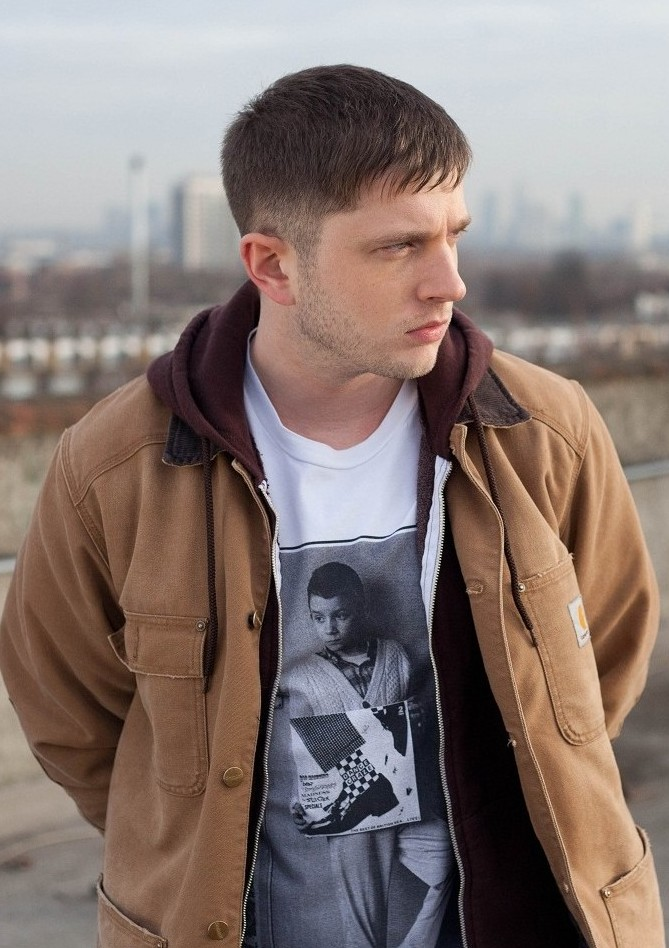
- Plan B in 2012, during filming for iLL Manors

Background information
- Also known as: Ben Drew; DTPB; Maximus' Papa; Paulio; Mr Kortni
- Born: Benjamin Paul Ballance-Drew; 22 October 1983 (age 42); London, England
- Origin: Forest Gate, East London, England
- Genres: Hip-hop; acoustic; soul; drum and bass; R&B; rap rock; grime
- Occupations: Rapper; singer; songwriter; actor; filmmaker
- Years active: 2005–present
- Labels: 679; Atlantic; Mercury; Pet Cemetery; Warner Bros.; Asylum

Benjamin Paul Ballance-Drew, better known by his stage name Plan B, is an English rapper, singer, songwriter, actor and filmmaker. He first emerged as a rapper, releasing his debut studio album, Who Needs Actions When You Got Words, in 2006. His second studio album, The Defamation of Strickland Banks (2010), was a soul and R&B album, and debuted at number one on the UK Albums Chart. He has also collaborated with other artists such as Chase & Status, most notably on the 2009 top ten single "End Credits".

Drew has also had a successful film career as an actor, with roles in Adulthood (2008), Harry Brown (2009), 4.3.2.1. (2010) and The Sweeney (2012). In 2012, he released the film Ill Manors, which he wrote and directed. He also made the music, and released a Plan B soundtrack album, which became his second number-one album.

== Early life and education ==
Benjamin Paul Ballance-Drew was raised in London. His mother worked for a local authority and his father, Paul Ballance, played in a punk rock band called the Warm Jets during the 1970s. He was five months old when his father walked out on the family, and six years old when his father "disappeared completely". Growing up, Drew felt isolated, stating, "We weren't working class but we weren't middle class, we were in the void in-between. I've always felt like a social outcast." He is a fan of Arsenal.

From 11, Drew attended the Anglo European School in Ingatestone, Essex. He later transferred to Tom Hood School, before being expelled and sent to Tunmarsh Pupil Referral Unit in Newham, London, for children unable to attend mainstream school. He finally left school with three GCSEs. He taught himself how to play guitar at 14, first playing Blur and Oasis songs with friends, then going on to write his own R&B love songs. At 18, feeling uncomfortable with R&B, he turned towards rap and hip-hop and wrote "Kidz", inspired by the murder of Damilola Taylor.

Drew explained his stage name during an appearance on USA Today in 2007, stating, "The whole reason for calling myself Plan B was that I was doing this sweet-boy Justin Timberlake shit, but I never felt comfortable... when I started rapping, it was easier for me to feel comfortable."

== Music career ==
Plan B has said that his work had been influenced by John Cooper Clarke.

=== 2005–2009: Early career and debut album ===
Plan B first appeared with the track "Cap Back", produced by DJ Wonder (formerly of Roll Deep), on the grime compilation album Run the Road (2005). His first single "Kidz"/"Dead and Buried" was also released in 2005 as a limited edition 7" vinyl on his own label Pet Cemetery Records. He soon gained a recording contract with 679 Recordings and released his second double A-side single "Sick 2 Def"/"No Good", filming his debut music video for "No Good".

In early 2006, Plan B released a video-only download single for "Missing Links", which later had to be re-recorded because he did not gain sample permission from Radiohead for the use of "Pyramid Song". He also released his first mixtape It's Time 4 Plan B with the May 2006 issue of Hip Hop Connection magazine. On 23 June 2006, Plan B made his first television appearance on Later... with Jools Holland, performing an acoustic version of "Mama (Loves a Crackhead)". His début album Who Needs Actions When You Got Words was recorded with producers Paul Epworth, Fraser T Smith and the Earlies, and was released 26 June 2006, charting the following week at number thirty on the UK Albums Chart. The album gained positive reviews from most critics, including a five-star review from The Guardian's Alexis Petridis. In July 2006, "Mama (Loves a Crackhead)" was released as a single, becoming the first Plan B song to appear on the UK Singles Chart, peaking at number forty one. In 2006, Paul Epworth and Plan B collaborated again on the track "More Is Enough" by Epic Man (Paul Epworth).

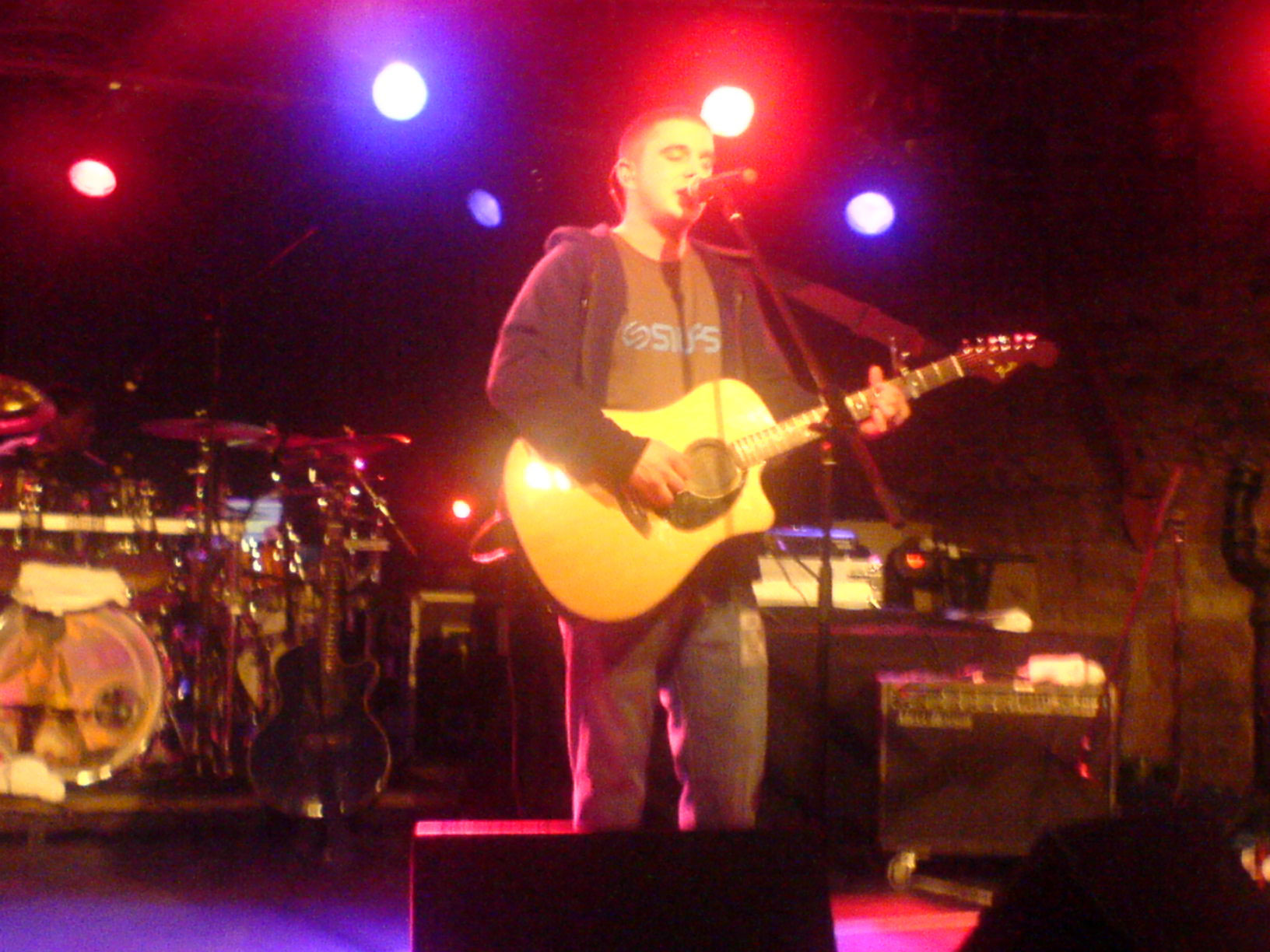
Plan B performing at the Arches, Glasgow (2007)

After touring throughout 2006, playing at festivals such as Reading and Leeds, a music video was filmed for "No More Eatin'" to accompany the release of Plan B's Live at The Pet Cemetery EP on 30 October 2006 (including a new version of "No More Eatin'" and two b-sides). On 11 December 2006, he released the Remixes EP (which included the Hadouken! remix of "No More Eatin'"). During his January–February 2007 tour (which included support from Professor Green, Example, Killa Kela and Hadouken!), Plan B released his second mixtape Paint It Blacker, containing bootleg recordings of songs by artists such as the Rolling Stones, Nirvana, Radiohead, Coldplay, Leonard Cohen and José González with producers Sem, Beni G from the Mixologists and Amir Amor. In 2007, Plan B re-released the song "No Good" with new remixes, and a music video was filmed for the b-side "Bizness Woman" (featuring beatboxer Kila Kella). Also in 2007, Plan B featured on songs by other artists such as Professor Green, Killa Kela, Skrein, Shameless and the Mitchell Brothers.

With a supporting role in the film Adulthood (2008), Plan B recorded three songs for the film's soundtrack – "End in the Streets", "On It 08" with Adam Deacon and "I Need Love" featuring Raleigh Ritchie. Plan B also featured on the Chase & Status single "Pieces", which topped the UK Dance Chart in 2008 and peaked at number seventy on the UK Singles Chart. In 2009, Plan B recorded "Shifty" with Riz MC and Sway, which was lifted from the soundtrack to Eran Creevy's film Shifty (2009), starring Riz Ahmed (Riz MC) and Daniel Mays. Also in 2009, Plan B played Noel Winters in Harry Brown, and achieved his first Top ten hit single with "End Credits", another collaboration with Chase & Status which featured in the soundtrack for Harry Brown.

=== 2009–2014: Strickland Banks era and Ill Manors ===
Plan B's second album and film The Defamation of Strickland Banks was released on 12 April 2010. The lead single from the album, "Stay Too Long", reached number nine on the UK Singles Chart. The next single from the album, "Love Goes Down", was accompanied by an official music video featuring Andy Crane, Paul Young, Abbey M. Butler, Vicky McClure and Kaya Scodelario, which had its own premiere on 16 November 2010. He supported Noel Gallagher on the second night of his solo shows at the Royal Albert Hall on 26 March 2010, and played in Bangor at the Radio 1 Big Weekend on 23 May 2010 on the New Music We Trust stage. He performed a duet of "I Guess That's Why They Call It the Blues" with Elton John as part of Elton's BBC Electric Proms performance at the Roundhouse in London in October 2010.

On 16 February 2011, Drew won Best British Male at the Brit Awards. Later that year he announced that he was working on a new album called The Ballad of Belmarsh, which was to be a hip-hop concept album telling the story of Plan B's alter-ego, Strickland Banks. Work on the album was later put on hold to focus on the film Ill Manors and it was ultimately shelved completely.

In March 2012, he released the single and video for "Ill Manors", a song (containing a sample from Peter Fox's "Alles neu") which deals with the 2011 London Riots, and which was described by The Guardian as "the first great mainstream protest song in years". A soundtrack album and film of the same name (Drew's first as both writer and director) were released in June 2012, followed by three more singles: "Lost My Way", "Deepest Shame" and "Playing with Fire". In July 2012, Drew issued an apology after he appeared on the cover of Shortlist magazine wearing a t-shirt featuring white supremacist rock band Skrewdriver.

Drew produced "Pray for Love" by Kwabs, released on 6 May 2014.

=== 2017–2018: Heaven Before All Hell Breaks Loose ===
On 18 May 2017, Drew released his first single in five years, titled "In the Name of Man", and announced that he had been in the studio recording an album. The album, Heaven Before All Hell Breaks Loose, was released on 13 April 2018. He said in an interview that this album is less hip-hop orientated than his first two albums "....because I feel that I'm not being honest with myself if I'm living the high life and I'm trying to rap about the other side of things". Drew said that he had taken time off from the music industry to focus on fatherhood, and also to connect with friends and family he says he felt alienated from after the release of Ill Manors.

== Film career ==
=== Acting ===
After previously appearing in Iain Forsyth and Jane Pollard's short film Walking After Acconci (Redirected Approaches) in 2005, Drew's first major film role was as a supporting character (Dabs) in Noel Clarke's Adulthood (2008). His song "Kidz" was previously included in the soundtrack to Kidulthood (2006), which led to Drew being cast in the sequel.

In 2009, Drew had another supporting role as Noel Winters in the Daniel Barber film Harry Brown, starring Michael Caine and Emily Mortimer. In 2010, Drew appeared in Noel Clarke's film 4.3.2.1.. He co-starred in the 2012 film The Sweeney, based on the 1970s British TV show of the same name, alongside Ray Winstone, playing the role of George Carter. The film was released on 12 September 2012 and went straight in at number 1 in the box office charts.

=== Directing ===
Drew expressed an interest in working in film early in his music career. In an interview about Who Needs Actions When You Got Words, he said:

"We're still promoting this album and I've started work on the next one, but I'm really getting into film at the moment. I'm writing this script, and I really want to find some time to focus on it, I really feel that's what I'm destined to be doing.

In 2008, Drew directed his first short film Michelle, which starred Adam Deacon and Ed Skrein. He also directed the music video for "Pieces" (his collaboration with Chase & Status).

Drew began production on his first full-length feature film, Ill Manors, in September 2010. Speaking in March 2010 to UK soul-writer Pete Lewis (Deputy Editor of the award-winning Blues & Soul), Drew described 'Ill Manors':

It's a hip-hop, music-based feature film which has six short stories that all kinda mix together to make one BIG story – and each mini-story will be represented by a different hip-hop track. It'll all be narrated by me, and it'll actually be the reverse of 'The Defamation Of Strickland Banks' – in that with 'Ill Manors', the film will come out first and the soundtrack will come afterwards. And again the soundtrack will be a film for the blind, in that you'll be able to listen to it and it'll tell you the story of the film.

== Advertising ==
In June 2011, Hewlett-Packard signed up Plan B as part of their advertising campaign for their Beats Audio laptops, using a short film exclusive to UK cinemas which showed Plan B with his band in a recording studio deconstructing the song "She Said", which had been a UK chart success a year earlier. Subsequently, in its 24 June issue, the British satirical magazine Private Eye made reference to the ad in its Ad Nauseam column, voicing the magazine's view that Plan B's involvement in the commercial seemed to be at odds with his comments at the Ivor Novello Awards regarding music promotion, where he criticised what "…has to go on in order to get your music to get played to the masses" (in reference to his own US stage tour just prior to the awards).

In July 2011, Bulmer's Cider announced that they had signed up Plan B to promote their product, releasing an advert which depicted a live performance by Plan B.

== Discography ==
Studio albums

- Who Needs Actions When You Got Words (2006)
- The Defamation of Strickland Banks (2010)
- Heaven Before All Hell Breaks Loose (2018)

== Filmography ==
List of film performances as an actor
Title	Year	Role	Notes
Adulthood	2008	Dabs	Credited as Ben Drew
Harry Brown	2009	Noel Winters	Credited as Ben Drew
4.3.2.1.	2010	Terry	Credited as Ben Drew
Turnout	2011	John	Credited as Ben Drew
Ill Manors	2012	Taxi driver (cameo)	Also writer and director
The Sweeney	2012	DS George Carter	Credited as Ben Drew
Catch Me Daddy	TBA		Pre-production
The Devil's Dandruff	TBA	Jason Cook	Pre-production

List of short film and music video performances as an actor
Title	Year	Role	Notes
Walking After Acconci (Redirected Approaches)	2005	Lead role	Short film
Michelle	2008	Himself, narrator	Short film Also director
"Sour Times" (by Riz MC)	2009	Himself (cameo)	Music video
"Let You Go" (by Chase & Status feat. Mali)	2010	Drug dealer (cameo)	Music video
"2 Minute Silence" (by The Royal British Legion)	2010	Himself (cameo)	Music video
"Raver" (by Shy FX feat. Kano, Donaeo & Roses Gabor)	2010	Himself (cameo)	Music video
The Defamation of Strickland Banks	TBA	Strickland Banks	Short film In production Also director

List of films, short films and music videos as a crew member
Title	Year	Role	Notes
Michelle	2008	Director	Short film
"Pieces" (by Chase & Status feat. Plan B)	2008	Director	Music video
Ill Manors	2012	Director	
"Lost My Way" (by Plan B)	2012	Director	Music video Also directed by Paul Caslin
"Guess Again" (by Plan B)	2018	Writer	Music video

== Tours ==
- Who Needs Actions When You Got Words Tour (2006–2007)
- The Defamation of Strickland Banks Tour (2010–2011)
- Ill Manors Tour (Grindhouse Tour) (2012–2013)
- Heaven Before All Hell Breaks Loose Tour (2018)
