= The Mitchell Brothers =

Ghanaian British rap duo

- Origin: London, England
- Genres: Hip hop, UK garage
- Instrument: Vocals
- Years active: 2004–2008
- Label: The Beats / Warner Music
- Members: Owura "Tony" Nyanin; Kofi "Teddy" Hanson

The Mitchell Brothers were a Ghanaian British rap duo from London, England, consisting of cousins Owura "Tony" Nyanin from Manor Park and Kofi "Teddy" Hanson from Stockwell. They were the first signing to Mike Skinner's the Beats imprint and are sometimes known as the "geezers with skills".

== History ==
Tony Nyanin and Teddy Hanson named themselves The Mitchell Brothers after siblings Phil and Grant Mitchell in the British soap EastEnders.

As teenagers, they pressed up 1,000 remix CDs called Sorted.

Teddy Hanson spotted Mike Skinner from the Streets in their local Barclays Bank in Brixton, South London, soon after Skinner had released his debut album, Original Pirate Material. Hanson slipped a copy of his and Nyanin's demo CD into Skinner's bag, with his phone number on it. Skinner signed them to The Beats label and produced their first album. Hanson performed with Skinner on the latter's hit single, "Fit But You Know It".

The Mitchell Brothers released their debut single "Routine Check" which peaked at No. 42 on the UK Singles Chart in March 2005. Their debut album, A Breath of Fresh Attire, was released in August 2005 and reached No. 56 on the UK Albums Chart. Their second album, Dressed for the Occasion, was released in November 2007. It was preceded by the singles "Solemate" and "Michael Jackson", the latter of which was produced Scottish producer Calvin Harris. Despite disappointing sales of this album, it was described as "still born and fresh" by Skinner.

Most recently, Tony Nyanin signed to Paramount Music and is now pursuing a solo career as Mr Mitchell. Mr Mitchell's first solo single titled "On the Rooftop" was released in 2012.

== Discography ==
=== Albums ===
- Sorted (mixtape) (2004)
- A Breath of Fresh Attire (2005) - UK #56 (BPI silver)
- Dressed for the Occasion (2007)
- Beam Us Up Scotty (mixtape)

=== Singles ===
- "Routine Check" (2005) - UK #42
- "Harvey Nicks" (2005) - UK #62
- "Excuse My Brother" (2005) - UK #58
- "Alone with the TV" (2006) - UK #92
- "She's Got It All Wrong" (2006)
- "SoleMate" (2007)
- "Michael Jackson" (2007) - UK #65
