= Pieces (Chase & Status song) =

Single by Chase & Status featuring Plan B

from the album More Than Alot
- B-side: "Eastern Jam"
- Released: 29 September 2008
- Recorded: 2008
- Genre: Drum and bass
- Length: 4:51
- Label: RAM
- Songwriters: Will Kennard; Saul Milton; Ben Drew
- Producers: Chase & Status

Chase & Status singles chronology
"Take Me Away" (2008)	"Pieces" (2008)	"Against All Odds" (2009)

Plan B singles chronology
"No Good" (2007)	"Pieces" (2008)	"Shifty" (2009)

Music video
- "Pieces" on YouTube

"Eastern Jam" cover

"Pieces" is a collaborative single, recorded by British musicians and production team Chase & Status featuring vocals from British rapper Plan B. The single was released on 29 September 2008 as the lead single from Chase & Status' debut studio album, More Than Alot. The track, co-written by Ben Drew (Plan B himself), later went on to feature in Drew's first movie production, Ill Manors, with the music video also appearing on the DVD release. The music video for "Pieces" was directed by Drew, and features Chase & Status and Plan B in the recording studio, recording the track, while Plan B's ex-girlfriend destroys his flat and the trio witness it on CCTV.

"Pieces" was released as a double A-side single with the instrumental track "Eastern Jam", which became the following track in More Than Alot. "Eastern Jam" is one of the few dubstep songs in the drum and bass album, and another one of Chase & Status's earliest hit songs. It is based on the song "Silsila Ye Chaahat Ka" (as performed by Shreya Ghoshal, produced by Ismail Darbar and written by Nusrat Badr) from the soundtrack of the 2002 Bollywood film Devdas. The track was later reproduced by Ted "Wild Animals" Chung to become the basis for the Snoop Dogg song "Snoop Dogg Millionaire", which was inspired by the similarly titled 2008 film. The remix features singer Tanvi Shah, who is heard singing in both English and Hindi in the song.

== Track listing ==
CD single
No.	Title	Writer(s)	Length
1.	"Pieces" (radio edit)	Will Kennard; Saul Milton; Ben Drew	3:00
2.	"Pieces"	Kennard; Milton; Drew	4:51
3.	"Eastern Jam"	Kennard; Milton	4:00

12" single / 12" picture disc
No.	Title	Writer(s)	Length
1.	"Pieces"	Will Kennard; Saul Milton; Ben Drew	4:51
2.	"Eastern Jam"	Kennard; Milton	4:00

Digital download EP / promotional CD single
No.	Title	Writer(s)	Length
1.	"Pieces"	Will Kennard; Saul Milton; Ben Drew	4:51
2.	"Eastern Jam"	Kennard; Milton	4:00
3.	"Pieces" (radio edit)	Kennard; Milton; Drew	3:00
4.	"Eastern Jam" (radio edit)	Kennard; Milton	3:19

== Personnel ==
- Saul Milton – producer
- Will Kennard – producer
- Plan B – vocals
- Mitchy Boy – artwork

== Chart performance ==
Chart (2008)	Peak position
UK Dance (OCC)	1
UK Singles (OCC)	70
