= Who Needs Actions When You Got Words =

Studio album by Plan B
- Released: 26 June 2006
- Recorded: 2005–2006
- Studio: Miloco Studios (London, England)
- Genre: Hip-hop, acoustic, hardcore hip-hop
- Length: 62:48
- Label: 679
- Producer: Plan B, Fraser T Smith, Paul Epworth, Eliot James, Sam Williams, The Nextmen, The Earlies (co.), Jonathan Quarmby (add.), Kevin Bacon (add.), ALX

Plan B chronology
Who Needs Actions When You Got Words (2006)	The Defamation of Strickland Banks (2010)

Singles from Who Needs Actions When You Got Words
- 1. "Kidz / Dead and Buried" Released: 8 September 2005; 2. "Sick 2 Def" Released: 3 December 2005; 3. "Missing Links" Released: 18 January 2006; 4. "More Is Enough" Released: 21 April 2006; 5. "Mama (Loves a Crackhead)" Released: 10 July 2006; 6. "No More Eatin'" Released: 30 October 2006; 7. "No Good" Released: 19 February 2007

Professional ratings
Review scores
Source	Rating
AllMusic	4.5/5 stars
Blender	2.5/5 stars
The Guardian	5/5 stars
NME	7/10 stars
Pitchfork	(7.5/10)
PopMatters	6/10 stars
Rolling Stone	2.5/5 stars

Who Needs Actions When You Got Words is the debut studio album released by British rapper and songwriter Plan B on 26 June 2006. The album was recorded with producers such as Fraser T Smith, Paul Epworth, The Earlies and The Nextmen. The title of the album derives from a line in the Meat Puppets song "Plateau".

== Background ==
The vinyl version of the album was released as a double 12" vinyl, and bonus 7" vinyl, containing a total of fourteen tracks. The vinyl version featured the tracks in a slightly different order than the standard release, and also includes "Breakdown", and the Earlies version of "Sick 2 Def", in place of the standard version, however, the track "Everyday" is omitted. A deluxe edition of the album was issued in certain territories in 2007, containing the all-new collaborative single with Epic Man, More is Enough. The album received very favourable reviews from critics in the hip-hop, indie and mainstream communities. In 2006, Q Magazine rated the album sixty-fourth in their 100 Best Albums of 2006. The album reached and peaked at No. 30 on the UK Albums Chart, when it was released on 26 June 2006. In February 2010, three and a half years after its release, the album was certified Silver by British Phonographic Industry for selling over 60,000 copies.

== Singles ==
"Kidz / Dead and Buried" was released on 8 September 2005 as the lead single from the album. The single was available as a limited edition 7" vinyl single, limited to 500 copies, and released on Plan B's own record label, Pet Cemetery Records. The promotional CD single was accompanied by the previously unreleased track "Young Girl". A video for "Dead and Buried" features clips from the film Kidulthood, but does not feature Drew. "Sick 2 Def" was released on 3 December 2005 as the second single from the album. The single was available as a two-track CD single and a limited edition 7" vinyl. The single was backed by fellow album track, "No Good". The single was released on 679 Recordings. No music video was filmed for the track. "Missing Links" was released on 18 January 2006, as the third single from the album. The track was only released as a promotional single, due to permission being refused to release the sample of "Pyramid Song" by Radiohead as part of the single. The track was Plan B's first single to have an official accompanying music video. * "More Is Enough" was released as a collaborative single with Epic Man on 21 April 2006. Although not included on the original version of the album, the song appears as the first track on the deluxe edition of the record, Enough is Enough. A music video was filmed for the release, which was available on limited edition 7" vinyl only.

"Mama (Loves a Crackhead)" was released as the album's fifth single on 10 July 2006. The single was Plan B's first single to be released on multiple formats, including limited edition 7" vinyl, CD single and DVD single, and was Plan B's first track to appear on the UK Singles Chart, peaking at No. 41. A music video was released for the track. "No More Eatin'" was released on 30 October 2006 as the album's sixth single. The single lead two exclusive releases - No More Eatin': Live at The Pet Cemetery EP and No More Eatin': The Remixes EP. The single was available on both CD single and limited edition 7" and 12" vinyl. An acoustic music video was filmed for the track. "No Good" was released on 19 February 2007 as the album's seventh and final single. The track's music video was filmed in December 2005 when it appeared as the B-side to the single "Sick 2 Def". The single was released on limited edition 12" vinyl and as a DVD single. For the single release, the track was remixed by Jeremy Wheatley. Although not officially released as singles, music videos were filmed for the "No Good" b-side track "Bizness Woman", featuring Killa Kela, and for the album track, "Charmaine", was released to music channels in April 2007, and the album's title track, "Who Needs Actions When You Got Words", was released as a promotional single in June 2007.

== Track listing ==
No.	Title	Writer(s)	Producer(s)	Length
1.	"Kidz"	Ben Drew, Fraser T Smith	Fraser T Smith	4:07
2.	"Sick 2 Def"	Drew	Fraser T Smith	4:44
3.	"No Good"	Drew, Paul Epworth, Kelly Charles, James Edward Bratton	Paul Epworth	4:56
4.	"Dead and Buried"	Drew, Fraser T Smith	Fraser T Smith, Plan B	4:39
5.	"Mama (Loves a Crackhead)"	Drew, Daryl Hall, John Oates, Sara Allen	Plan B, Jonathan Quarmby (add.), Kevin Bacon (add.)	3:57
6.	"Charmaine"	Drew, Fraser T Smith, Jerry Fuller	Fraser T Smith, Plan B	3:46
7.	"I Don't Hate You"	Drew	Plan B	5:15
8.	"Everyday"	Drew, Eliot James	Eliot James, Plan B	4:24
9.	"Tough Love"	Drew	Plan B	5:03
10.	"Where Ya From?"	Drew, Epworth	Plan B, Paul Epworth (co.)	3:43
11.	"No More Eatin'"	Drew	Plan B, The Earlies (co.)	4:41
12.	"Missing Links"	Drew	Plan B	3:53
13.	"Couldn't Get Along"	Drew, Sam Williams	Plan B, Sam Williams	5:44
14.	"Who Needs Actions When You Got Words"	Drew, Brad Ellis, Dominic Betmead	Plan B, The Nextmen	3:53
Total length:				62:48

iTunes Store and Japanese Bonus Tracks
No.	Title	Writer(s)	Producer(s)	Length
15.	"Rakin' the Dead"	Drew, Jim Long	ALX	4:34
16.	"Breakdown" (featuring The Earlies)	Drew	Plan B, The Earlies	4:53
Total length:				4:34

Deluxe Edition Bonus Disc: "Something for Nothing"
No.	Title	Writer(s)	Producer(s)	Length
1.	"More Is Enough" (with Epic Man)	Drew, Epworth	Paul Epworth	3:36
2.	"Breakdown" (featuring The Earlies)	Drew	Plan B, The Earlies	4:53
3.	"More Is Enough" (Sinden Remix)	Drew, Epworth	Paul Epworth	4:58
4.	"Who Needs Actions When You Got Words" (Hot Chip Remix)	Drew, Ellis, Betmead	Plan B, The Nextmen	5:09
5.	"No Good" (A. Brucker Remix) (featuring MPHO))	Drew, Epworth, Charles, Bratton	Paul Epworth	3:39
6.	"No Good" (Chase & Status & Beni G Remix)	Drew, Epworth, Charles, Bratton	Paul Epworth	4:24
7.	"Mama (Loves a Crackhead)" (Music Video)			3:57
8.	"No Good" (Music Video)			4:56
9.	"No More Eatin'" (Music Video)			4:41

LP Version
No.	Title	Writer(s)	Producer(s)	Length
1.	"Kidz"	Drew, Smith	Fraser T Smith	4:07
2.	"Sick 2 Def" (featuring The Earlies)	Drew	Plan B, The Earlies (co.)	4:34
3.	"No Good"	Drew, Epworth, Charles, Bratton	Paul Epworth	4:56
4.	"Mama (Loves a Crackhead)"	Drew, Hall, Oates, Allen	Plan B, Jonathan Quarmby, Kevin Bacon	3:57
5.	"Charmaine"	Drew, Smith, Fuller	Fraser T Smith, Plan B	3:46
6.	"I Don't Hate You"	Drew	Plan B	5:15
7.	"Tough Love"	Drew	Plan B	5:03
8.	"Where Ya From?"	Drew, Epworth	Plan B, Paul Epworth	3:43
9.	"Couldn't Get Along"	Drew, Williams	Plan B, Sam Williams	5:44
10.	"No More Eatin'"	Drew	Plan B, The Earlies	4:41
11.	"Missing Links"	Drew	Plan B	3:53
12.	"Who Needs Actions When You Got Words"	Drew, Ellis, Betmead	Plan B, The Nextmen	3:53
13.	"Breakdown" (featuring The Earlies)	Drew	Plan B, The Earlies	4:53
14.	"Dead and Buried"	Drew, Smith	Fraser T Smith, Plan B	4:39

== Personnel ==
- Plan B - vocal, guitar, producer, mixing, art direction

Production

- Fraser T Smith – producer, mixing
- Paul Epworth – producer, mixing
- Eliot James – producer, engineer, mixing
- Sam Williams – producer, mixing
- The Nextmen – producer
- ALX – producer
- The Earlies – co-producers
- Jonathan Quarmby – additional producer, mixing
- Kevin Bacon – additional producer, mixing
- Finn Eiles – engineer, mixing
- Jimmy Robertson – engineer, mixing
- Tesfa Pitt – engineer, programming
- Alan O'Connell – engineer
- Tom Knott – engineer
- Analog Kid – drum programming
- Brad Ellis – drum programming, mixing
- Dominic Betmead – mixing
- John Davis – mastering

Additional musicians

- NY – backing vocals, additional vocals
- Akatriel – additional vocals
- Randolph Matthews – backing vocals
- Andrew Smith – guitar
- Tom Knott – guitar
- Jamie King – guitar
- Dominic Betmead – guitar, turntables
- Andy Sheldrake – bass
- Christian Madden – keyboard
- Cassell The BeatMaker – drums
- Richard Young – drums
- Harry Escott – cello
- Kai Fish – cello
- Eliot James – cello, piano
- Alex Berry – double bass
- Beni G – turntables

Other personnel

- Ben Drury – design, additional photography, art direction
- Neil Gavin – photography
- Ben Sansbury – graphic design
- Dan Stacey – A&R
- Nicky Stein – legal

Sample credits

- "No Good" incorporates elements of "You're No Good for Me" by Kelly Charles.
- "Mama (Loves a Crackhead)" incorporates elements of "I Can't Go for That (No Can Do)" by Hall & Oates.
- "Charmaine" incorporates elements "Young Girl" by Gary Puckett & the Union Gap.

== Release history ==
Region	Date	Label	Format	Catalog
United Kingdom	26 June 2006	679	CD	5051011497926
United Kingdom	26 June 2006	679	2xLP + 7"	505101149791
Australia	19 November 2006	679	2xCD	CTX334CD

== Chart performance ==
=== Weekly charts ===
Chart (2006)	Peak position
UK Albums Chart	30

=== Certifications ===
Country	Certification
United Kingdom	Gold

== Tour ==
Who Needs Actions When You Got Words Tour
- Tour by Plan B
- Location: United Kingdom, Europe, Japan, United States, Australia
- Associated album: Who Needs Actions When You Got Words
- Start date: 13 May 2006
- End date: 24 May 2007
- Legs: 5

Plan B concert chronology
- Who Needs Actions When You Got Words Tour (2006–2007); The Defamation of Strickland Banks Tour (2010–2011)

=== Live band ===
- Plan B – vocals, guitar
- Tom Wright-Goss – guitar
- Andy Sheldrake – bass
- Cassell The BeatMaker – drums
- Beni G – DJ, turntables

=== Support acts ===
- Example (July 2006, January–February 2007)
- Professor Green (January–February 2007)
- Hadouken! (January–February 2007)
- Killa Kela (January–February 2007)

=== Tour dates ===
Date	City	Country	Venue
Leg 1: United Kingdom
13 May 2006	Leeds	United Kingdom	The Faversham^{[A]}
31 May 2006	London	United Kingdom	The Macbeth
12 July 2006	Newcastle	United Kingdom	Carling Academy Newcastle
13 July 2006	Glasgow	United Kingdom	King Tut's Wah Wah Hut
14 July 2006	Birmingham	United Kingdom	Carling Academy 2 Birmingham
15 July 2006	Liverpool	United Kingdom	Carling Academy 2 Liverpool
18 July 2006	Nottingham	United Kingdom	Rescue Rooms
19 July 2006	Manchester	United Kingdom	Academy 3
21 July 2006	London	United Kingdom	Mean Fiddler
22 July 2006	Bristol	United Kingdom	Ashton Court^{[B]}
23 July 2006	Brighton	United Kingdom	Concord 2
Leg 2: Festivals
12 August 2006	Osaka	Japan	Intex Osaka^{[C]}
13 August 2006	Chiba	Japan	Chiba Marine Stadium^{[C]}
26 August 2006	Reading	United Kingdom	Little John's Farm^{[D]}
27 August 2006	Leeds	United Kingdom	Bramham Park^{[D]}
28 August 2006	Edinburgh	United Kingdom	The Liquid Room^{[E]}
12 November 2006	Paris	France	La Cigale^{[F]}
Leg 3: United Kingdom & Ireland
28 January 2007	Dublin	Ireland	The Village
30 January 2007	Preston	United Kingdom	53 Degrees
31 January 2007	Birmingham	United Kingdom	Carling Academy 2 Birmingham
1 February 2007	Leeds	United Kingdom	The Cockpit
2 February 2007	Glasgow	United Kingdom	The Arches
3 February 2007	Sheffield	United Kingdom	The Leadmill
7 February 2007	Manchester	United Kingdom	Academy 2
8 February 2007	Cardiff	United Kingdom	University Solus
9 February 2007	London	United Kingdom	Shepherd's Bush Empire
10 February 2007	Bristol	United Kingdom	Anson Rooms
12 February 2007	Cambridge	United Kingdom	The Junction
13 February 2007	Liverpool	United Kingdom	Carling Academy 2 Liverpool
14 February 2007	Norwich	United Kingdom	Waterfront
15 February 2007	Southampton	United Kingdom	University
22 February 2007	London	United Kingdom	Fopp
Leg 4: United States
12 March 2007	New York City	United States	Joe's Pub
13 March 2007	Los Angeles	United States	Cinespace
15 March 2007	Austin	United States	Trinity Lounge^{[G]}
16 March 2007	Austin	United States	301 Chicon Street^{[G]}
17 March 2007	Austin	United States	Zero Degrees^{[G]}
17 March 2007	Austin	United States	Beauty Bar^{[G]}
Leg 5: Australia
19 May 2007	London	United Kingdom	Scala
24 May 2007	Melbourne	Australia	Ding Dong Lounge
26 May 2007	Sydney	Australia	The Basement
Leg 6: Festivals
16 June 2007	London	United Kingdom	Hyde Park^{[H]}
17 June 2007	Leeds	United Kingdom	Harewood House^{[H]}
21 June 2007	New York City	United States	Hiro Ballroom
23 June 2007	Pilton	United Kingdom	Worthy Farm^{[I]}
29 June 2007	Istanbul	Turkey	Solar Beach^{[J]}
8 July 2007	Balado	United Kingdom	Balado^{[K]}
20 July 2007	Trenčín	Slovakia	Trenčín Airport^{[L]}
4 August 2007	Faversham	United Kingdom	Mount Ephraim Gardens^{[M]}
18 August 2007	Chelmsford	United Kingdom	Hylands Park^{[N]}
24 May 2007	Staffordshire	United Kingdom	Weston Park^{[N]}

Festivals and other miscellaneous performances

^{[A]} As part of Nasty Fest
^{[B]} As part of Ashton Court Festival
^{[C]} As part of Summer Sonic Festival
^{[D]} As part of Reading and Leeds Festivals
^{[E]} As part of T on the Fringe
^{[F]} As part of Les Inrocks Festival
^{[G]} As part of SXSW
^{[H]} As part of Wireless Festival
^{[I]} As part of Glastonbury Festival
^{[J]} As part of Radar Live Festival
^{[K]} As part of T in the Park
^{[L]} As part of Pohoda Festival
^{[M]} As part of Electric Gardens
^{[N]} As part of V Festival
