= Ill Manors =

2012 British crime drama film directed by Plan B

- Theatrical release poster.
- Directed by: Ben Drew
- Written by: Ben Drew
- Produced by: Atif Ghani
- Starring: Riz Ahmed; Ed Skrein; Keef Coggins; Andrew Okello; Lee Allen; Nick Sagar; Ryan De La Cruz; Anouska Mond; Saleh Ahmed; Natalie Press
- Cinematography: Gary Shaw
- Edited by: David Freeman; Hugh Williams; Sotira Kyriacou; Farrah Drabu
- Music by: Plan B; Al Shux
- Production company: Film London Microwave; BBC Films; Aimimage; Plan B Enterprises; Gunslinger; UK Film Council; British Film Institute
- Distributed by: Revolver Entertainment
- Release date: 6 June 2012
- Running time: 121 minutes
- Country: United Kingdom
- Language: English
- Budget: £100,000
- Box office: £453,570 (UK)

Ill Manors (stylised as ill Manors) is a 2012 British crime drama film written, co-scored and directed by Ben Drew AKA musician Plan B. The film revolves around the lives of eight main characters, played by Riz Ahmed, Ed Skrein, Keef Coggins, Lee Allen, Nick Sagar, Ryan De La Cruz, Anouska Mond and Natalie Press, and features six original songs by Plan B, which act as a narration for the film. Ill Manors is a multi-character story, set over the course of seven days, a scenario where everyone is fighting for respect. The film focuses on the violence that surrounds the main characters as they struggle to survive on the streets. Each story is also represented by a different rap song performed by Plan B.

== Cast ==
- Riz Ahmed as Aaron
- Ed Skrein as Ed
- Keef Coggins as Kirby
- Andrew Okello as Kurt
- Lee Allen as Chris
- Nick Sagar as Marcel
- Ryan De La Cruz as Jake
- Anouska Mond as Michelle
- Mem Ferda as Vladimir
- Natalie Press as Katya
- Martin Serene as Wild Bill
- Sean Sagar as Freddie
- Georgia Farthing as April
- Jayden Allen as Lil Chris
- Dannielle Brent as Jo
- Eloise Smyth as Jody
- Sasha Gamble as Chanel
- Neil Large as Terry
- Lee Whitlock as Vince
- Jo Hartley as Carol
- Finbar Fitzgerald as Callum
- John Cooper Clarke as himself
- Plan B as the narrator and taxi driver (cameo)
- Chris Wilson as Police Dog Handler

== Production ==
Prior to writing the script for Ill Manors, when Plan B was 21 years old, he had originally tried to begin production on another script he had written called Trigger, which was based on an incident where his home was raided by armed police. However, he was refused funding as he was an inexperienced director. To gain the necessary experience, Plan B wrote and directed his own short film Michelle in 2008 which was financed by himself with £4,000 from the remaining recording advance from his record label and an inheritance from his grandfather.

The short film, which starred Anouska Mond, Ed Skrein and Adam Deacon, was released online and acted as a pilot for the feature film Ill Manors, which Plan B had completed the script for within four months of making Michelle. He also directed the music video for "Pieces", his collaboration with Chase & Status, and also had roles in Adulthood (2008) and Harry Brown (2009). The script for Ill Manors was partly based on actual events and stories Plan B had heard when he was young, such as a woman prostituting herself in order to repay a drug dealer. The film had been in development for three years prior to filming; however, Drew struggled to secure finance for his film. Ill Manors was greenlit for production in 2009 as part of the Film London Microwave scheme.

For the film, Plan B hired a mixture of experienced and inexperienced actors, while several cast members already knew the director personally before they were cast in their roles. Riz Ahmed, who had previously recorded "Shifty" with Plan B, asked to play the lead role of Aaron after reading the script. Ed Skrein was a childhood friend of Plan B who had appeared in Michelle and had previously collaborated with him on numerous recordings.

Keef Coggins is Plan B's godfather and Anouska Mond, who had also previously appeared in Plan B's short film was invited to audition for her previous role as Michelle. Notably, Little Simz made a brief cameo in the movie at the 1 hour 24 minute mark years before her rise to fame. The main casting process for the film took place during August 2010 with several cast members being young unknown actors from the East End of London, such as Ryan De La Cruz who was discovered when the crew visited Rokeby School in Canning Town, London.

Principal photography began on 1 September 2010 at 3 Mills Studios, London and filming lasted for four weeks on location in London, England. Plan B has named the 1996 film Pusher directed by Nicolas Winding Refn as a major influence on Ill Manors, as well as directors Shane Meadows and Quentin Tarantino. During production of the film, it was reported that the cast and crew ran into trouble with youths in Forest Gate, London and production was interrupted while a laptop containing the film's dailies had to be recovered after being stolen by a drug addict. Drew claimed that he faced prejudice from some crew members while on set; however, he also noted that "there was some people that really believed in my vision and gave me all the support I needed."

Editing of the film began in December 2010, but post-production of the film was delayed due to Plan B performing on The Defamation of Strickland Banks Tour during 2010 and 2011. To raise funds for the completion of the film's post-production, the distribution rights to Ill Manors were sold to Revolver Entertainment in April 2011 and Plan B delayed the release date of his planned third studio album The Ballad of Belmarsh until after Ill Manors was released.

== Release ==
The trailer for Ill Manors was first aired on The Guardian's website on 3 May 2012, while the first film poster was first unveiled by Empire magazine's website on 8 May 2012. Digital Spy also unveiled two further promotional posters on 18 May and 7 June 2012. The premiere took place on 30 May 2012 at the Empire cinema in Leicester Square, London. This screening was also attended by several British recording artists such as Alesha Dixon, Alexandra Burke, Professor Green, Tinie Tempah, Wretch 32, Example and Ed Sheeran.

The film was given a wide release to 191 cinemas in both Republic of Ireland and the United Kingdom by Revolver Entertainment on 6 June 2012. Ill Manors was released in the Netherlands on 30 August 2012 by Benelux Film Distributors and was also screened at the Toronto International Film Festival and the Festival do Rio in September 2012. Ill Manors was released on DVD on 8 October 2012, and contains footage that was not broadcast at cinemas.

== Reception ==
On its opening weekend, the film placed at number nine at the UK Box Office, with a gross figure of £256,288. Domestically, the film has earned a total gross of £453,570, after eight weeks at the box office. Ill Manors has received largely positive reviews from critics and fans alike, with a current 77% "fresh" rating on Rotten Tomatoes based on thirty-one different reviews.

== See also ==
- List of hood films
