= Long Hot Summer Tour '26 =

Concert tour by American singer-songwriter Bob Dylan

- Tour by Bob Dylan
- Location: North America
- Start date: June 4, 2026
- End date: August 1, 2026
- Legs: 1
- No. of shows: 34

Bob Dylan concert chronology
- Rough and Rowdy Ways World Wide Tour (2021-26); Long Hot Summer Tour '26 (2026); Lights of Autumn Tour (2026)

The Long Hot Summer Tour '26 was a concert tour by American singer-songwriter Bob Dylan. The tour began in Troutdale, Oregon on June 4, 2026 and concluded in Nashville, Tennessee on August 1, 2026.

== Background ==
The first date of Long Hot Summer Tour '26 in Thackerville, Oklahoma was announced on March 17, 2026. Two shows in Woodinville, Washington were added the following day. Further dates were announced in April, 2026.

A concert originally planned on July 29, 2026 at Raleigh's Red Hat Amphitheater was cancelled due to weather concerns. Support acts Lucinda Williams and Jimmie Vaughan performed, but Dylan did not.

== Set list ==
This set list was taken from the show in San Diego on June 21, 2026. It does not represent all shows throughout the tour.

1. "To Be Alone with You"
2. "Man in the Long Black Coat"
3. "All Along the Watchtower"
4. "Tryin' to Get to Heaven"
5. "False Prophet"
6. "I Can Tell" (Samuel Smith, Bo Diddley)
7. "Black Rider"
8. "Share Your Love with Me" (Alfred Braggs, Don Robey)
9. "When I Paint My Masterpiece"
10. "I'll Make It All Up to You" (Charlie Rich)
11. "Crossing the Rubicon"
12. "Soon After Midnight"
13. "Under The Red Sky"
14. "I've Made Up My Mind to Give Myself to You"
15. "Goodbye Jimmy Reed"
16. "Every Grain of Sand"

=== List of songs performed ===
Songs performed

Blonde on Blonde

- "Rainy Day Women Nos. 12 & 35"

John Wesley Harding

- "All Along the Watchtower"

Nashville Skyline

- "To Be Alone with You"

Bob Dylan's Greatest Hits Vol. II

- "Watching the River Flow"
- "When I Paint My Masterpiece"
- "I Shall Be Released"
- "You Ain't Goin' Nowhere"

Shot of Love

- "Every Grain of Sand"

Oh Mercy

- "Man in the Long Black Coat"

Under the Red Sky

- "Under the Red Sky"

Time Out of Mind

- "Love Sick"
- "Tryin' to Get to Heaven"

Together Through Life

- "Forgetful Heart"

Tempest

- "Soon After Midnight"
- "Early Roman Kings"

The Bootleg Series Vol. 11: The Basement Tapes Complete

- "Baby, Won’t You Be My Baby"

Rough and Rowdy Ways

- "I Contain Multitudes"
- "False Prophet"
- "I've Made Up My Mind to Give Myself to You"
- "Black Rider"
- "Goodbye Jimmy Reed"
- "Crossing the Rubicon"

Covers

- "Axe and the Wind" (Willie Dixon)
- "I Can Tell" (Bo Diddley)
- "I'll Make It All Up to You (Charlie Rich)
- "Nervous Breakdown" (Eddie Cochran)
- "Share Your Love with Me" (Alfred Braggs, Don Robey)

== Tour dates ==
Date (2026)	City	Country	Venue	Supporting act(s)
June 4	Troutdale	United States	McMenamins Edgefield Amphitheater	Lucinda Williams, The John Doe Folk Trio
June 6	Woodinville	United States	Chateau Ste. Michelle Winery	Lucinda Williams, The John Doe Folk Trio
June 7	Woodinville	United States	Chateau Ste. Michelle Winery	Lucinda Williams, The John Doe Folk Trio
June 9	Eugene	United States	The Cuthbert Amphitheater	Lucinda Williams, The John Doe Folk Trio
June 12	Lincoln	United States	The Venue at Thunder Valley	—N/a
June 13	Berkeley	United States	Hearst Greek Theatre	Lucinda Williams, The John Doe Folk Trio
June 14	Berkeley	United States	Hearst Greek Theatre	Lucinda Williams, The John Doe Folk Trio
June 17	Santa Barbara	United States	Santa Barbara Bowl	Lucinda Williams, The John Doe Folk Trio
June 18	Highland	United States	Yaamava' Theater	—N/a
June 20	Palm Desert	United States	Acrisure Arena	Lucinda Williams, The John Doe Folk Trio
June 21	San Diego	United States	The Rady Shell at Jacobs Park	Lucinda Williams, The John Doe Folk Trio
June 23	Phoenix	United States	Arizona Financial Theatre	Lucinda Williams, The John Doe Folk Trio
June 24	Tucson	United States	Anselmo Valencia Tori Amphitheater	—N/a
June 26	Albuquerque	United States	Sandia Amphitheater	—N/a
June 29	Austin	United States	Moody Amphitheater	Lucinda Williams, The John Doe Folk Trio
June 30	New Braunfels	United States	Whitewater Amphitheater	Lucinda Williams, The John Doe Folk Trio
July 2	Thackerville	United States	Lucas Oil Live	—N/a
July 3	Rogers	United States	Walmart Arkansas Music Pavilion	Lucinda Williams, The John Doe Folk Trio
July 4	Kansas City	United States	Starlight Theatre	Lucinda Williams, The John Doe Folk Trio
July 6	Shakopee	United States	Mystic Lake Amphitheater	Lucinda Williams, The John Doe Folk Trio
July 8	Chicago	United States	Huntington Bank Pavilion	Lucinda Williams, The John Doe Folk Trio
July 10	Cincinnati	United States	PNC_Pavilion	Lucinda Williams, The John Doe Folk Trio
July 12	Pittsburgh	United States	Stage AE	Jimmie Vaughan and his Tilt-A-Whirl Band, Brittney Spencer
July 14	Philadelphia	United States	Highmark Mann	Jimmie Vaughan and his Tilt-A-Whirl Band, Brittney Spencer
July 16	Boston	United States	Leader Bank Pavilion	Jimmie Vaughan and his Tilt-A-Whirl Band, Brittney Spencer
July 18	Gilford	United States	BankNH Pavilion	Jimmie Vaughan and his Tilt-A-Whirl Band, Brittney Spencer
July 19	Bridgeport	United States	Hartford HealthCare Amphitheater	Jimmie Vaughan and his Tilt-A-Whirl Band
July 21	New York City	United States	Forest Hills Stadium	Lucinda Williams, Jimmie Vaughan and his Tilt-A-Whirl Band
July 23	Richmond	United States	Allianz Amphitheater at Riverfront	Lucinda Williams, Jimmie Vaughan and his Tilt-A-Whirl Band
July 24	Vienna	United States	Filene Center at Wolf Trap	Lucinda Williams, Jimmie Vaughan and his Tilt-A-Whirl Band
July 25	Vienna	United States	Filene Center at Wolf Trap	Lucinda Williams, Jimmie Vaughan and his Tilt-A-Whirl Band
July 29	Wilmington	United States	Live Oak Bank Pavilion	Lucinda Williams, Jimmie Vaughan and his Tilt-A-Whirl Band
July 31	Atlanta	United States	Synovus Bank Amphitheater	Lucinda Williams, Jimmie Vaughan and his Tilt-A-Whirl Band
August 1	Nashville	United States	Ascend Amphitheater	Lucinda Williams, Jimmie Vaughan and his Tilt-A-Whirl Band

=== List of cancelled concerts ===
Date (2026)	City	Country	Venue	Reason
July 28	Raleigh	United States	Red Hat Amphitheater	Weather conditions.

== Personnel ==
- Bob Dylan - Vocals, keyboard, harmonica, guitar
- Tony Garnier - Bass guitar
- Anton Fig - Drums
- Bob Britt - Guitar (June 4 - June 26, 2026)
- Doug Lancio - Guitar (June 4 - June 14, 2026)
- Joel Patterson - Guitar (June 29 - August 1, 2026)
- Julian Lage - Guitar (June 17 - June 26, July 6, July 8, July 14 - July 19, and July 29 - August 1, 2026)
- Jad Tariq - Guitar (July 10, July 12 and July 21 - July 25, 2026)
- Jimmie Vaughan - Guitar (Guest on August 1, 2026)
