= Mother of Muses =

2020 song by Bob Dylan

Song by Bob Dylan

from the album Rough and Rowdy Ways
- Released: June 19, 2020
- Recorded: January–February 2020
- Studio: Sound City (Los Angeles)
- Genre: Folk
- Length: 4:29
- Label: Columbia
- Songwriter: Bob Dylan
- Producer: None listed

Rough and Rowdy Ways track listing
- 10 tracks: 1. "I Contain Multitudes"; 2. "False Prophet"; 3. "My Own Version of You"; 4. "I've Made Up My Mind to Give Myself to You"; 5. "Black Rider"; 6. "Goodbye Jimmy Reed"; 7. "Mother of Muses"; 8. "Crossing the Rubicon"; 9. "Key West (Philosopher Pirate)"; 10. "Murder Most Foul"

The engraving on the back of Dylan's Nobel medal, which may have inspired "Mother of Muses"

"Mother of Muses" is a song written and performed by the American singer-songwriter Bob Dylan and released as the seventh track on his 2020 album Rough and Rowdy Ways. It is a spare and meditative acoustic folk song in which the first person-narrator offers a paean to Mnemosyne, the goddess of memory in Greek mythology who gave birth to the nine Muses (the inspirational goddesses of literature, science and the arts).

== Background and composition ==
In an article published online in July 2020, one month after the release of Rough and Rowdy Ways, Dylan scholar Rolf Säfström theorized that "Mother of Muses" had been inspired by Dylan's having won the Nobel Prize in Literature in 2016. Dylan had formally received the prize on April 1, 2017, before playing a concert in Stockholm, Sweden, in a small ceremony with no press or photographers present as per Dylan's request. Säfström noted that Sara Danius, secretary of the Swedish Academy, nonetheless published a short book on Dylan later that year in which she described his reaction to receiving the prize: "When he had the golden medal in his hand, he turned the backside up, looked at it for a long time and seemed amazed" by an engraving that depicted a poet listening to and writing down the song of a Muse playing a lyre. The engraving is accompanied by a Latin inscription, adapted from Virgil's Aeneid, "Inventas vitam iuvat excoluisse per artes", which literally translates to: "It is beneficial to have improved (human) life through discovered arts".

Dylan scholar Laura Tenschert agrees with Säfström's theory and sees "Mother of Muses" as part of a diptych of songs, along with "My Own Version of You", that explicitly explore the "myth and mystery of creation" on Rough and Rowdy Ways. Niall Brennan also sees the song as "the most direct statement yet of how seriously Dylan has mediated upon the Nobel honours" but argues that the "central verses seem to suggest that he sees himself as undeserving of such high recognition, mentioning heroes both named and unnamed who might be more worthy".

In the 2022 edition of their book Bob Dylan All the Songs: The Story Behind Every Track, authors Philippe Margotin and Jean-Michel Guesdon describe the song as "a very fine ballad with more or less Celtic influences, in a style that is not a million miles away from Mark Knopfler. The arrangements are once more deliberately reduced: we hear lots of acoustic and electric guitars, the bowed double bass and some sporadic contributions from Matt Chamberlain on bass drum (or orchestral kettledrum)". The song is performed in the key of A major. The second line in each verse contains an E6-E7 guitar figure (sometimes played as E minor) that Dylan previously used when covering Charles Aznavour's song "The Times We've Known" live in concert.

== Themes ==
The song is a prayer for inspiration and artistic skill, featuring an invocation to the "Mother of Muses" to sing for (and through) the narrator. Dylan scholar Tony Attwood has observed that this is similar to how, in Ancient Greece, Mnemosyne was "called upon by poets who seek her help so that they may correctly remember the lines that they are to recite". The opening line to Dylan's song, "Mother of Muses, sing for me", even seems to explicitly recall the opening lines of Homer's Odyssey and Iliad (which begin, "Sing in me, Muse..." and "Sing, goddess...", respectively). Dylan had previously quoted Robert Fitzgerald’s 1961 translation of the opening invocation of Homer's Odyssey (“Sing in me, O Muse, and through me tell the story”) at the end of his Nobel lecture, which he delivered in June 2017.

Historian and Harvard Latinist Richard F. Thomas notes that in much the same way that Homer and Virgil prayed to the Muse to help them in "memorializing the fighters of old", so too does Dylan ask for help in memorializing "those generals who fought for the freedoms that America enjoys, in the wars against the Confederacy and Nazi Germany" (e.g., William Tecumseh Sherman, Bernard Montgomery, Winfield Scott, Georgy Zhukov and George S. Patton). Thomas also believes that the song serves an important structural function as "the introduction to the rest of the album" whose final three "increasingly longer songs" ("Crossing the Rubicon", "Key West (Philosopher Pirate)" and "Murder Most Foul") form a trilogy that deal with the assassination of political figures (Julius Caesar, William McKinley and John F. Kennedy).

== Critical reception ==
"Mother of Muses" has frequently been described by critics as a "hymn". Nick Tavares wrote that it is "one of the record’s highest moments" and describes it as "a quiet lament, calling for those spirits to help him carry on, and for new ones to carry forward when he’s gone". In a review of Rough and Rowdy Ways at Hot Press, Anne Margaret Daniel noted that it possesses a "stately, quiet grace". Johnny Borgan compared its "beautiful melody" and lyrics to Dylan's earlier "Ring Them Bells". Ludovic Hunter-Tilney praised Dylan's vocal performance in Financial Times, writing that "he sandpapers his rough and rowdy voice and croons the words as tenderly as he can".

Spectrum Culture included the song on a list of "Bob Dylan's 20 Best Songs of the '10s and Beyond". In an article accompanying the list, critic Peter Tabakis considered that the song would not have been out of place on Dylan's Time Out of Mind: "There’s a gentleness, if not a wariness, to the song that harmonizes better with tracks like 'Not Dark Yet' and 'Standing in the Doorway' than some of the more rip-roaring compositions that followed. And its contemplative reckoning with mortality and one’s own legacy of course mirrors the central themes of his 1997 opus. In the end, it’s unclear if Dylan is begging Mnemosyne for help with his own memory, or perhaps ours with regard to him long after he’s gone. Either way 'Mother of Muses' is another late-period track that, to put too fine a point on it, is unforgettable".

A 2021 Guardian article included it on a list of "80 Bob Dylan songs everyone should know". A 2021 article at Inside of Knoxville listed it as one of the "25 Best Dylan Songs from the Last 25 Years".

== In popular culture ==
Folk singer (and former Dylan paramour) Joan Baez, who believes Rough and Rowdy Ways is as good as anything Dylan has ever done, quoted the song while paying tribute to the recently deceased Ruth Bader Ginsburg in a Rolling Stone interview in 2020: "She had outlived her life by far".

== Cultural references ==
The fourth verse, about "falling in love with Calliope", explicitly references Mnemosyne's daughter Calliope, the Greek goddess of music, song and dance, and the muse of Epic Poetry.

The song's last line, "I'm traveling light and I'm slow coming home", may refer to the journey of Odysseus (Richard F. Thomas has written extensively about Dylan seeing himself as "Odysseus transfigured") while also alluding to songs that appeared on each of the final three albums by Dylan's friend Leonard Cohen ("Traveling Light", "Slow" and "Going Home").

== Live performances ==
"Mother of Muses" received its live debut at the Riverside Theater in Milwaukee, Wisconsin on November 2, 2021, the first concert of Dylan's Rough and Rowdy Ways World Wide Tour. According to Dylan's official website, he has performed the song in concert 275 times as of November 2025.

== Cover versions ==
The song was covered by blues singer Rory Block on her 2024 album Positively 4th St.

It was covered in an instrumental version by Anders Koppel and Henrik Dam Thomsen on their 2022 album Gently.

== See also ==
- Civil rights movement in popular culture
