= Key West (Philosopher Pirate) =

2020 song by Bob Dylan

Song by Bob Dylan

from the album Rough and Rowdy Ways
- Released: June 19, 2020
- Recorded: January–February 2020
- Studio: Sound City, Los Angeles
- Length: 9:34
- Label: Columbia
- Songwriter: Bob Dylan
- Producer: None listed

Audio
- "Key West (Philosopher Pirate)" on YouTube

Rough and Rowdy Ways track listing
- 10 tracks: 1. "I Contain Multitudes"; 2. "False Prophet"; 3. "My Own Version of You"; 4. "I've Made Up My Mind to Give Myself to You"; 5. "Black Rider"; 6. "Goodbye Jimmy Reed"; 7. "Mother of Muses"; 8. "Crossing the Rubicon"; 9. "Key West (Philosopher Pirate)"; 10. "Murder Most Foul"

"Key West (Philosopher Pirate)" is a song written and performed by the American singer-songwriter Bob Dylan, released as the ninth track on his thirty-ninth studio album, Rough and Rowdy Ways (2020). The tracks for the album were written by Dylan at his home in Point Dume in late 2019 and early 2020. It was recorded at Sound City Studios in Los Angeles in January and February 2020 and released in June 2020. The song is an accordion-driven ballad that incorporates references to other songs and to the City of Key West.

"Key West (Philosopher Pirate)" has been cited as a high point of the album by many reviewers. While critics have acclaimed the song, some have been hesitant to interpret meaning from the lyrics, focusing instead on the instrumental and vocal performances. According to Dylan's official website, he has performed the song in concert 278 times as of March 2026.

== Background and release ==
On June 19, 2020, Bob Dylan released the album Rough and Rowdy Ways, his first album of original material since Tempest in 2012. Tempest had been followed by three albums of covers from the Great American Songbook. Meanwhile Dylan had continued to play live on his "Never Ending Tour", and had been awarded the 2016 Nobel Prize in Literature. The tracks for Rough and Rowdy Ways were written by Dylan at his home in Point Dume in late 2019 and early 2020. The songs were recorded at Sound City Studios in Los Angeles in January and February 2020. At a concert in Liverpool on November 3 2024, Dylan claimed to have written the song while visiting Ernest Hemingway’s house.

Apart from Dylan, who sang, and played guitar and harmonica, the musicians for the album included guitarists Charlie Sexton and Bob Britt, bass player Tony Garnier and drummer Matt Chamberlain. On "Key West (Philosopher Pirate)", Donnie Herron played accordion, and Benmont Tench was on Hammond organ. It is a ballad, that starts with two verses followed by a chorus, followed by two more verses then another chorus, then two sets of three verses and a chorus. The stanzas, of six lines, rhyme in an aabccb pattern. The song lasts for 9 minutes and 34 seconds. Some critics have compared the music to Dylan's melancholy 1989 love song "Most of the Time".

The song's opening words, "McKinley hollered, McKinley squalled", refer to the opening of Charlie Poole's 1926 song "White House Blues", which describes the shooting and subsequent death from gangrene of President William McKinley. In the second verse, the song's narrator identifies himself with a trio of famous Beat Generation writers: Allen Ginsberg, Gregory Corso, and Jack Kerouac. Ginsberg, who was close friends with Dylan, once wrote a poem titled "Walking at Night in Key West". Dylan incorporates the titles of other popular songs into the lyrics of "Key West", including "Goin' Down Slow", "Down in the Boondocks", "Try a Little Tenderness", and "Beyond the Sea". The lyrics also reference several locations in Key West, Florida, including Mallory Square, where President Harry S. Truman had his winter White House, as well as the fictional Mystery Street.

Historian Douglas Brinkley characterized the song as "an ethereal meditation on immortality set on a drive down Route 1 to the Florida Keys". Dylan has expressed admiration for the work of longtime Key West resident Jimmy Buffett, covering "A Pirate Looks at Forty" in concert, and citing the songs "Death of an Unpopular Poet" and "He Went to Paris" as his favorite Buffett compositions in an interview.

== Reception ==
Rolling Stone ranked "Key West" the second best song of 2020 (behind only Cardi B and Megan Thee Stallion's "WAP") and placed it seventh on a list of "The 25 Best Bob Dylan Songs of the 21st Century". In an article accompanying the latter list, music journalist Rob Sheffield extrapolated from the impressionistic lyrics a narrative about "a grizzled outlaw, hiding out in Florida, hounded by his memories". Sheffield, who found the song enigmatic, included it in his own list of the best 25 songs of 2020. Hyperallergic's Lucas Fagen wrote that, "in a voice drunk on blood and sunshine, Dylan sings a rapturous, almost operatic ode to the island, going overboard in his praise" and suggested that the song was affecting due to its "specificity and absurdity". He found it poignant and unexpectedly stirring. Among the reviewers who have cited it as the high point of Rough and Rowdy Ways are The New Yorker's Amanda Petrusich, who called it "Shakespearean" for its lyrical richness and complexity, and Anne Margaret Daniel at Hot Press, who wrote that "'Key West (Philosopher Pirate)' is what I'd take to my desert island". The song was highlighted as one of three standouts by both Ben Yakas of Gothamist and Danny McElhinney of Extra.ie when they named Rough and Rowdy Ways as among the best albums of 2020. In GQ, Charlie Burton and Bill Prince praised the song for containing "plaintive digressions and memories brought together with the same kind of magic that Dylan was weaving back in the mid-1970s".

Authors Adam Selzer and Michael Glover Smith have drawn thematic parallels between "Key West" and Harold Arlen and Yip Harburg's "Over the Rainbow" and Dylan's own "Murder Most Foul", respectively. Smith also praised Donnie Herron's accordion playing on the track, which he cited as "the aural personification of a gentle Florida breeze, warmly embodying the 'healing virtues of the wind' that Dylan so memorably sings about". Spectrum Culture included the song on a list of "Bob Dylan's 20 Best Songs of the '10s and Beyond". In an article accompanying the list, critic Kevin Korber praised the "dreamlike" lyric, and suggested that they could reflect Dylan, aged nearly 80, imagining what an afterlife would be like while only having his lived experience to extrapolate from.

The Big Issue placed "Key West" at number 8 on a 2021 list of the "80 best Bob Dylan songs – that aren't the greatest hits" and called it a "[g]loriously meandering masterpiece from his latest album". Edward Docx included the track in his 2021 list of "80 Bob Dylan songs everyone should know" in The Guardian. Rolling Stone critic Andy Greene acclaimed "Key West" as "the best song [Dylan has] written in at least the past decade", while the Associated Press writer Scott Bauer found the song "breathtaking".

== Live performances ==
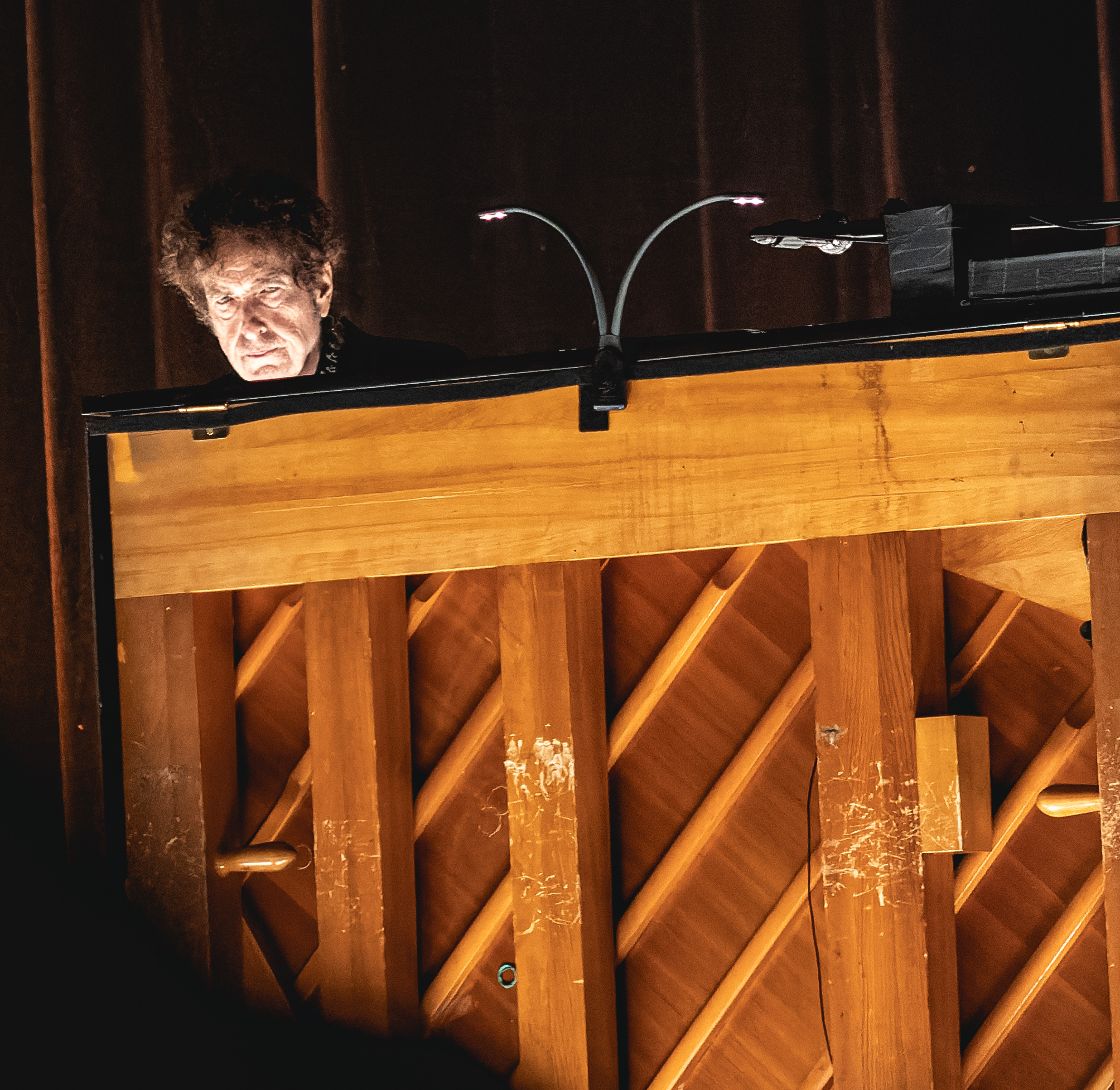
Dylan pictured at the London Palladium on October 19, 2022. He performed "Key West (Philosopher Pirate)" at the show.

"Key West" received its live debut at the Riverside Theater in Milwaukee, Wisconsin on November 2, 2021, the first concert of Dylan's Rough and Rowdy Ways World Wide Tour. In a Rolling Stone review, Andy Greene identified the performance as the "high point" of the show. Dylan performed several different arrangements of the song on tour. Richard Williams of The Guardian reviewed a London Palladium show in October 2022 and felt that the use of different chords for the song compared to those on the album gave the song a different feel. According to Dylan's official website, he has performed the song in concert 278 times as of March 2026.

== Accolades ==
Accolades for "Key West (Philosopher Pirate)"
Publication	Accolade	Rank	Ref.
Rolling Stone	The 50 Best Songs of 2020	2	
Rolling Stone	The 25 Best Bob Dylan Songs of the 21st Century	7	
The Big Issue	The 80 Best Bob Dylan Songs That Aren't Greatest Hits	8	
Spectrum Culture	Bob Dylan's 20 Best Songs of the '10s and Beyond	N/A	
The Guardian	80 Bob Dylan Songs Everyone Should Know (Note: List, excluding Dylan's best-known songs, by Edward Docx.)	N/A	
