= False Prophet (song) =

2020 single by Bob Dylan

Single by Bob Dylan

from the album Rough and Rowdy Ways
- Released: May 8, 2020
- Recorded: January and February 2020
- Studio: Sound City (Los Angeles)
- Genre: Blues rock; Jazz rock
- Length: 6:00
- Label: Columbia
- Songwriter: Bob Dylan
- Producer: None listed

Bob Dylan singles chronology
"I Contain Multitudes" (2020)	"False Prophet" (2020)

Rough and Rowdy Ways track listing
- 10 tracks: 1. "I Contain Multitudes"; 2. "False Prophet"; 3. "My Own Version of You"; 4. "I've Made Up My Mind to Give Myself to You"; 5. "Black Rider"; 6. "Goodbye Jimmy Reed"; 7. "Mother of Muses"; 8. "Crossing the Rubicon"; 9. "Key West (Philosopher Pirate)"; 10. "Murder Most Foul"

"False Prophet" is a song by American singer-songwriter Bob Dylan, the second track on his 39th studio album, Rough and Rowdy Ways (2020). It was released as the album's third and final single on May 8, 2020, through Columbia Records. The music is based on Billy "The Kid" Emerson's 1954 Sun Records single "If Lovin' Is Believin'".

== Background ==
The title of the song, and the refrain "I ain't no false prophet", are believed by many to be self-referential since Dylan has been referred to as both a "prophet" and a "false prophet" on many occasions since the 1960s. This is evident even in the titles of books featuring critical analysis of his work. Dylan has complained about the prophet label on numerous occasions over the years. Speaking to an audience in Omaha, Nebraska during a concert at the height of his gospel period in 1980, for instance, Dylan said, "Years ago they ... said I was a prophet. I used to say, 'No I'm not a prophet'. They say, 'Yes you are, you're a prophet'. I said, 'No it's not me'. They used to say, 'You sure are a prophet'. They used to convince me I was a prophet. Now I come out and say Jesus Christ is the answer. They say, 'Bob Dylan's no prophet'. They just can't handle it".

Dylan echoed these sentiments nearly a quarter of a century later when speaking to Ed Bradley for a 60 Minutes interview in 2004: "You’re just not that person everybody thinks you are, though they call you that all the time: ’You’re the prophet. You’re the savior’. I never wanted to be a prophet or savior. Elvis maybe. I could easily see myself becoming him. But prophet? No”. More notoriously, Pope Benedict XVI, when he was still known as Cardinal Ratzinger, opposed Dylan's playing at a Catholic youth event for Pope John Paul II in 1997 on the basis that he was a false prophet. In a memoir about his predecessor published in 2007, Benedict wrote in reference to Dylan's performance that he "doubts to this day whether it was right to let this kind of so-called prophet take the stage" in front of the Pope.

== Composition and recording ==
It is likely that Dylan, who has been known to play recordings of older songs as reference points for his band in the studio, played Billy "The Kid" Emerson's "If Lovin' is Believin'" during the Rough and Rowdy Ways sessions. As drummer Matt Chamberlain explained in an interview, "[Dylan] might have like a reference point for a groove or a feel and then we'll just kind of jam on that. And then he'll start trying to sing over it, and then he'll get on the piano and add some extra chords and we'll kind of work out the arrangement, and the next thing you know we've tracked the song".

Dylan referred to "False Prophet" as one of three "12-bar structural things" on Rough and Rowdy Ways (the other two being "Goodbye Jimmy Reed" and "Crossing the Rubicon") while praising guitarist Charlie Sexton in an interview with Douglas Brinkley that appeared in The New York Times. This implies that Sexton is the principal guitarist on the song, which features some colorful but subtle electric guitar playing and a near-solo during the outro. The song is performed in the key of C major.

== Themes ==
Historian and Harvard University Latinist Richard F. Thomas has analyzed the lyrics to "False Prophet" in relation to classical antiquity, which factors into other songs on Rough and Rowdy Ways more overtly (especially "Mother of Muses" and "Crossing the Rubicon"):

- He sees the lines "I'm first among equals, second to none" as a reference to Augustus Caesar being "proud of his claim to be 'first among equals' which upheld the fiction that the [Ancient Roman] system, effectively a monarchy, was still a republic—those are hard to hold onto, then as now".
- He sees the lines "Last of the best, you can bury the rest / Bury 'em naked with their silver and gold" as a reference to "what happened across twenty years of the Roman civil war, initiated when [Julius] Caesar crossed the Rubicon in January of 49 BC: by the year 30, Augustus, 'last of the best,' buried Antony, as Antony and he buried Brutus and Cassius, they all buried Julius Caesar, and Caesar buried Pompey".
- He sees the lines "Put out your hand, there's nothin' to hold / Open your mouth, I'll stuff it with gold" as a reference to the grisly murders of at least two Roman generals (Manius Aquillius and Cassius Dio) who "were reported to have died by having their mouths stuffed with gold".

== Release ==
The song was released unexpectedly on Dylan's YouTube channel on May 8, 2020, three weeks to the day after the stealth release of Dylan's previous single "I Contain Multitudes" and six weeks to the day after the stealth release of the "Murder Most Foul" single. The YouTube video consists of the song accompanied by a gruesome still image, reminiscent of pulp magazine covers, of a skeleton wearing a tuxedo and top hat who is carrying a gift-wrapped box in one hand and a syringe in the other. A shadow on the wall behind this "skeleton dandy" forms the shape of a man hanging from a noose. Some commentators, including Dylanologist A. J. Weberman, felt that the swooping-bangs hairstyle seen in the shadow's outline was meant to resemble Donald Trump, which influenced how they interpreted the song.

The release of the single had been teased several hours before its premiere by a status update on Dylan's official Twitter account featuring the artwork and a quote from the lyrics: "What are you lookin’ at - there’s nothing to see". This artwork, a modified version of an actual magazine cover (The Shadow #96), was also later included in one of the inner sleeves of the Rough and Rowdy Ways vinyl release. Although no artist is credited, the visual style is similar to the silkscreens Dylan created for his "Revisionist Art" exhibition in 2013.

== Critical response ==
NME critic Mark Beaumont, reviewing the song on May 8, 2020, before the release of Rough and Rowdy Ways, interpreted it as a sly self-inquiry into the Bob Dylan persona: "If there is a touch of autobiography, Dylan is clearly proud of his work after 50-plus years in the game, taking on a boxer’s pre-match bravado ('I’m first among equals, second to none / Last of the best, you can bury the rest') and nodding to the long-standing protest tradition he epitomised. 'I sing songs of love, I sing songs of betrayal,' he growls, 'can’t remember when I was born and I forget when I died'". Beaumont also predicted that, based on the strength of this performance, Dylan's "upcoming album will be a late-career high point".

Writing at Albumism, where the song was included in the site's "New Music We Love" column, Sarah Paolantonio wrote that the "chugging beat and rhyming phrases work effortlessly as a vehicle for a man who loves to tell stories and spin tales" and praised Dylan's vocal performance, noting that his "deep rusty drawl has aged perfectly" for the electric-blues genre.

Spectrum Culture included the song on a list of "Bob Dylan's 20 Best Songs of the '10s and Beyond".

== Music video ==
Screen capture from the official lyric video for "False Prophet"

Although the entirety of Rough and Rowdy Ways was released online for free via Bob Dylan's official YouTube channel, "False Prophet" was the only song for which an official music video was made. This "lyric video", which features minimalist animation and typography based on the album's pre-release artwork, debuted on June 22, 2020, three days after the rest of the album became available to stream.

== Cultural references ==
The song contains several quotations and paraphrases from Normandi Ellis's translation of the Egyptian Book of the Dead, including the lines "Another day of anger, bitterness and doubt" and "I opened my heart to the world and the world came in".

The song's sixth verse begins with the line "I've searched the world over for the Holy Grail". According to Arthurian legend, the Holy Grail is the cup from which Jesus drank during the Last Supper, although the phrase has also come to more generally refer to any "elusive object or goal that is sought after for its great significance". Interestingly, the line is also extremely close to something Dylan claims to have said to Rubin "Hurricane" Carter with regards to his touring schedule in an interview for the 2019 film Rolling Thunder Revue: A Bob Dylan Story by Martin Scorsese: "I'd say, 'Hurricane, I'm searching for the holy grail. I'm gonna search until I find it, like Sir Galahad'".

The line "I climbed a mountain of swords on my bare feet" is a reference to a Zen koan ("You must climb a mountain of swords with bare feet") that first appeared in the 13th century koan collection The Gateless Barrier compiled by Wumen Huikai.

The line "The city of God is there on the hill" is an allusion to a passage in the Gospel of Matthew: "You are the light of the world. A city set on a hill cannot be hidden".

== Live performances ==
"False Prophet" received its live debut at the Riverside Theater in Milwaukee, Wisconsin on November 2, 2021, the first concert of Dylan's Rough and Rowdy Ways World Wide Tour. According to Dylan's official website, he has performed the song in concert 316 times as of June 2026.

== Accolades ==
Accolades for "False Prophet"
Publication	Accolade	Rank
Quarter Rock Press	50 Best Songs of 2020	12
Spectrum Culture	Bob Dylan's 20 Best Songs of the '10s and Beyond	N/A
Vice	100 Best Songs of 2020	92

== See also ==
- List of Bob Dylan songs based on earlier tunes
