= My Own Version of You =

2020 song by Bob Dylan

Song by Bob Dylan

from the album Rough and Rowdy Ways
- Released: June 19, 2020
- Recorded: January–February 2020
- Studio: Sound City (Los Angeles)
- Genre: Folk
- Length: 6:41
- Label: Columbia
- Songwriter: Bob Dylan
- Producer: None listed

Rough and Rowdy Ways track listing
- 10 tracks: 1. "I Contain Multitudes"; 2. "False Prophet"; 3. "My Own Version of You"; 4. "I've Made Up My Mind to Give Myself to You"; 5. "Black Rider"; 6. "Goodbye Jimmy Reed"; 7. "Mother of Muses"; 8. "Crossing the Rubicon"; 9. "Key West (Philosopher Pirate)"; 10. "Murder Most Foul"

Todd Alcott's original poster art inspired by "My Own Version of You"

"My Own Version of You" is a song written and performed by the American singer-songwriter Bob Dylan and released as the third track on his 2020 album Rough and Rowdy Ways. Inspired by Mary Shelley's novel Frankenstein, this darkly comical song features a narrator who describes bringing "someone to life" using the body parts of disparate corpses in what has been widely interpreted as an elaborate metaphor for the songwriting process.

== Composition and recording ==
The song's lyrics prominently feature gothic-horror imagery, which can be found to a lesser extent on other tracks on Rough and Rowdy Ways (including "I Contain Multitudes", which references the stories "The Tell-Tale Heart" and "The Cask of Amontillado" by Edgar Allan Poe, and "Murder Most Foul", which alludes to the movies The Wolf Man, The Invisible Man and A Nightmare on Elm Street). A number of lyrics in "My Own Version of You" explicitly reference Frankenstein, including the opening verse ("I've been visiting morgues and monasteries / Looking for the necessary body parts") as well as lines about studying "Sanskrit and Arabic to improve my mind" and needing "one strike of lightning" and a "blast of 'lectricity that runs at top speed" in order to bring the song's creature, the "you" of the title, to life.

One of the song's most distinctive features is its unpredictability. The first half of the refrain that concludes each verse is the same ("I'll bring someone to life...") but is followed by a different lyric in the second half each time. Even more unusual is the way the number of lines in each verse varies dramatically from one verse to the next. As Chris Gregory writes in his book Determined to Stand: The Reinvention of Bob Dylan, "Two four line verses are followed by three eight line verses, two more four line verses and one final marathon twenty line verse. This unpredictability helps to maintain a distinctly edgy ambience, as we are drawn into the meandering narrative".

Some critics have noted that, even apart from the lyrics, the music to "My Own Version of You" is "spooky". This is due primarily to Tony Garnier's descending bass line and a pedal-steel guitar part by Donnie Herron that resembles the sound of the theremin parts frequently heard on science-fiction and horror-movie soundtracks. The song's overall musical atmosphere has also been compared to that of Screamin' Jay Hawkins' 1956 novelty-horror single "I Put a Spell on You". Dylan scholar and musicologist Eyolf Ostrem has described Blake Mills' guitar part as "quite advanced playing, which requires precision and dexterity".

== Themes ==
A number of critics see the notion of a mad-scientist narrator stitching together "body parts" in order to create new life as analogous to the way Dylan, as writer, stitches together lines from diverse sources (e.g., songs, poems, movie dialogue, etc.) in order to bring a song to life. Chief among these critics is Dylan scholar Laura Tenschert who posits "My Own Version of You" as part of a diptych of songs, along with "Mother of Muses", that explore the "myth and mystery of creation" on Rough and Rowdy Ways. Tenschert also considers that the line "I want to do things for the benefit of all mankind" may be a humorous reference to Dylan's having won the Nobel Prize in Literature in 2016: Alfred Nobel established the prize when he stated in his will that the remainder of his estate should be used to endow "prizes to those who, during the preceding year, have conferred the greatest benefit to humankind".

Still others see the "you" of the title as referring to Dylan himself, and the song's main theme being that of artistic reinvention. Critic Justin Cober-Lake, for instance, wrote that "The question, among all the wordplay, asks who the 'you' is that Dylan addresses. One path suggests he's recreating someone who has left. Another reading sees him speaking to himself. When he sings, 'I'm saying to hell to all things that I used to be', he suggests that he's reinventing himself, which maybe paradoxically, has been a core element of Dylan the artist. If so, the song talks directly to Dylan's fans and critics. If we’ve spent years creating our own imagined versions of who Dylan is, he can play with that idea, stitch some limbs together and make his own version of himself".

== Critical reception ==
Sam Sodomsky, writing in Pitchfork, called the song a "macabre narrative" in which Dylan sings "about playing god as he scavenges through morgues and cemeteries to reanimate a few notable corpses and absorb their knowledge...slapstick horror rendered as existential comedy". Writing in Rolling Stone, critic Rob Sheffield described Dylan's vocal performance on the track as "marvelously nimble and delicate" as he sings the song's humorous lyrics. Critic Sanjoy Narayan, who hailed Rough and Rowdy Ways as a "masterpiece", cited "My Own Version of You" as the one song "that really stood out" to him on the album.

In his review of Rough and Rowdy Ways in the Minneapolis Star Tribune, critic Jon Bream sees "My Own Version of You" as bearing the influence of the many traditional pop standards Dylan had recently recorded in the studio and live in concert: "Sonically, this has the flourish of neither colorful keyboardist [Leon Russell or Liberace] but rather plenty of underwater surf guitar. With Dylan's vocals upfront over what sounds like a soundtrack to an old silent movie, this moody piece recalls the evocative jazz of Dylan's three recent collections of standards".

Spectrum Culture cited it as one of "Bob Dylan's 20 Best Songs of the '10s and Beyond". The Big Issue placed it at #76 on a list of the "80 best Bob Dylan songs - that aren't the greatest hits". A 2021 Guardian article included it on a list of "80 Bob Dylan songs everyone should know".

== Cultural references ==
Two of the song's lyrics reference famous lines in plays by William Shakespeare: "Well, it must be the winter of my discontent" paraphrases the opening line of Richard III and "Tell me what it means / To be or not to be" alludes to the most well-known line in Hamlet.

"I'll take the Scarface Pacino and the Godfather Brando / Mix 'em up in a tank and get a robot commando" refers to two of the most famous performances by American "method actors" Al Pacino and Marlon Brando.

The line about making "gunpowder from ice" is a reference to a passage in Chapter 5 of Gulliver's Travels by Jonathan Swift.

The line "I'll be at the Black Horse Tavern on Armageddon Street" contains two references to the Book of Revelation: In addition to the obvious reference to the biblical end times battle, the "Black Horse" is likely a reference to the Third Horseman of the Apocalypse (AKA Famine) who rides a black horse and may also be the inspiration for the Rough and Rowdy Ways song ''Black Rider". However, the phrase could also evoke the White Horse Tavern in Greenwich Village—a famous hangout of folk musicians, artists, and bohemians, as well as the last place poet Dylan Thomas drank before his death. Given that Dylan took his stage name from Thomas, this may be a subtle nod to the poet’s tragic end.

The song alludes to classical antiquity with lines about Julius Caesar and "Trojan women and children" being sold into slavery. Similar references to Ancient Greece and Rome can be found on other songs on Rough and Rowdy Ways.

As in "Goodbye Jimmy Reed", the line "You can bring it to Saint Peter, you can bring it to Jerome" humorously juxtaposes the sacred and the secular by referencing an apostle of Jesus alongside Bo Diddley's maracas player. Jerome may also refer to Saint Jerome of Stridon, a Christian pirest, confessor and theologian.

The line "Can you help me walk that moonlight mile?" is a reference to the 1971 song "Moonlight Mile" by The Rolling Stones (who are also referenced as "them British bad boys" on Rough and Rowdy Ways' opening track "I Contain Multitudes").

Dylan identifies "Mr. Freud" and "Mr. Marx" as two of the "best-known enemies of mankind" in the song and refers to them as burning together in hell. Dylan had derisively mentioned Freud and Marx together on at least one previous occasion: At a press conference in Rome to promote Love and Theft in 2001, Dylan was asked if he feared analysis. His response was, "No...I don't know what anybody can find in any of my stuff...Analysis? A Freudian analysis, you mean? Or German idealism? Or maybe a Freudian-Marxist? I don't know".

== Live performances ==
"My Own Version of You" received its live debut at the Riverside Theater in Milwaukee, Wisconsin on November 2, 2021, the first concert of Dylan's Rough and Rowdy Ways World Wide Tour. According to Dylan's official website, he has performed the song in concert 275 times as of November 2025.
