= Black Rider (song) =

2020 song by Bob Dylan

Song by Bob Dylan

from the album Rough and Rowdy Ways
- Released: June 19, 2020
- Recorded: January–February 2020
- Studio: Sound City (Los Angeles)
- Genre: Folk
- Length: 4:12
- Label: Columbia
- Songwriter: Bob Dylan
- Producer: None listed

Rough and Rowdy Ways track listing
- 10 tracks: 1. "I Contain Multitudes"; 2. "False Prophet"; 3. "My Own Version of You"; 4. "I've Made Up My Mind to Give Myself to You"; 5. "Black Rider"; 6. "Goodbye Jimmy Reed"; 7. "Mother of Muses"; 8. "Crossing the Rubicon"; 9. "Key West (Philosopher Pirate)"; 10. "Murder Most Foul"

Fan art inspired by Bob Dylan's "Black Rider", created by manipulating a vintage comic book cover

"Black Rider" is a minor-key folk ballad written and performed by the American singer-songwriter Bob Dylan and released as the fifth track on his 2020 album Rough and Rowdy Ways. It is the shortest song on the album and features a sparse acoustic arrangement but its musical complexity and ambiguous lyrics have generated substantial critical analysis.

== Reception ==
In a four-and-a-half out of five-star review of Rough and Rowdy Ways in Uncut magazine, critic Richard Williams notes that the album's "subdued mood is dialed down a further notch for 'Black Rider': simple acoustic guitar and mandolin, just marking the chords, sometimes almost disappearing behind dream-like lyrics that sound as though they’re being written on water. Murmured to a rival or maybe to an alter ego, they contain perhaps the most surprising single word in Dylan’s entire recording career: 'Black rider, black rider, hold it right there / The size of your cock will get you nowhere / I’ll suffer in silence, I’ll not make a sound / Maybe I’ll take the high moral ground…' The song drifts along until it just vanishes completely, like a pebble in a pond".

Spectrum Culture included "Black Rider" on a list of "Bob Dylan's 20 Best Songs of the '10s and Beyond". In an article accompanying the list, David Harris noted that, "On initial listens, the song almost has a blink-and-you’ll-miss-it feel, but there is a sinister energy there that takes hold the more you hear the record...On an album filled with some of Dylan’s most urgent songs in years, 'Black Rider' stands out as one of the best. In many ways, it is a summation of the man’s career from topical songwriter to his Christian-inspired rock".

Critic Phil Shaw cited the song as being the very best on Rough and Rowdy Ways, acknowledging that it is not "the most obvious selection" but that it is "a grower from the first". He also named it as his fourth favorite song of the year 2020.

Screen Rant named it one of the "10 Saddest Songs of 2020 That We Couldn't Stop Listening To" and interpreted the song's subject to be death.

Music journalist Sam Liddicott called it one of the "most impactful" songs on the album and praised Dylan's "surprisingly smooth and sweet" vocal delivery, noting that the track exemplifies how Dylan possesses greater "vocal dexterity" than is commonly believed.

Stereogum ran an article to coincide with Dylan's 80th birthday on May 24, 2021 in which 80 musicians were asked to name their favorite Dylan song. The Kills' Alison Mosshart selected "Black Rider", noting how Rough and Rowdy Ways had served as the soundtrack to a solo roadtrip she took after the COVID-19 pandemic began: "Every time 'Black Rider' came on, I imagined myself some outlaw character. The song, the inner dialogue of the solo driver in the murdered-out muscle car gunning it through cuckoo-land, tempting the dark. It all felt right. It was my favorite song. I wound up driving around for the rest of the year. Seventeen thousand miles later, the collective reverberation of engine roar and Dylan’s new record will forever be interwoven in my memories of that strange time on the lost highway".

== Musical complexity ==
"Black Rider" is performed in the key of D minor. Dylan scholar and musicologist Eyolf Ostrem considers it to be Dylan's "most complex song ever" from a musical perspective (with the only competition coming from 1967's "Dear Landlord", 1980's "In the Garden" and 1989's "Ring Them Bells"). In a lengthy essay on his website, Ostrem details how Dylan's unusual chord changes (alternating between minor, major and seventh chords in surprising fashion) have the effect of making listeners "expect one thing" while he then gives them "something else". Ostrem sees this uncanny effect of subverting listener expectations as being underscored by some of the lyrics (e.g., "The road that you're on, same road that you know / Just not the same as it was a minute ago").

Matt Chamberlain's percussion on the song is also unusual. There are exactly five faint drumbeats on the track, one at the conclusion of each verse, an effect so spare and subtle that it has caused some critics to inaccurately describe the song as featuring no percussion at all.

== Lyrical interpretations ==
The lyrics of the song feature a first-person narrator addressing a mysterious enemy, the titular "black rider", across five verses. Critics have variously interpreted the character of the black rider as the biblical Third Horseman of the Apocalypse (AKA Famine), Bob Dylan's public persona, Satan, and/or the personification of "death itself".

In the 2022 edition of their book Bob Dylan All the Songs: The Story Behind Every Track, authors Philippe Margotin and Jean-Michel Guesdon analyze the song within the context of the COVID-19 pandemic, which they note "first appeared in November 2019" and claim that, when hearing lines like "You fell into the fire / You're eating the flame", "[o]ne inevitably thinks of a new scourge, a power of diabolical forces, that might take away everything. For the songwriter, however, there remains a glimmer of hope".

Writer and disc jockey Scott Warmuth sees the song as possibly relating to Robert Wilson's play The Black Rider, which premiered in 1990 and features songs by Tom Waits and a libretto by William S. Burroughs. Warmuth had already written at length about The Black Rider in relation to Dylan's work in 2013: The play's narrative involves a man making a bargain with the devil. In his libretto, Burroughs references Ernest Hemingway having likewise made a "devil's bargain" by allowing Hollywood producers to give his short story "The Snows of Kilimanjaro" a "happy ending", a tragedy from which Burroughs saw Hemingway as never having recovered, leading to artistic stasis and death. Dylan, who has acknowledged the influence of Burroughs on his own work, also made extensive but subtle use of "The Snows of Kilimanjaro" in the "Oh Mercy" chapter of his 2004 memoir Chronicles: Volume One. Warmuth sees Dylan as playing an elaborate formal game with close readers of his book: Dylan appropriates aspects of "The Snows of Kilimanjaro" in Chronicles as an indirect means of showing readers how he avoided making a "tragic mistake" similar to Hemingway during the writing and recording of his 1989 album Oh Mercy.

== Cultural references ==
The surprising line "The size of your cock will get you nowhere", much remarked upon in reviews of Rough and Rowdy Ways, is a close but more concise paraphrase of a sentence in Satire IX by the Ancient Roman poet Juvenal.

The line "Some enchanted evening I'll sing you a song" is a reference to the Rodgers and Hammerstein song "Some Enchanted Evening", which Dylan had recorded on his 2015 album Shadows in the Night.

The song's final line, "Black Rider Black rider, you've been on the job too long", is an allusion to the refrain of the traditional folk song "Duncan and Brady", which Dylan played live between 1999 and 2002, and a 1992 studio recording of which appeared on his album The Bootleg Series Vol. 8: Tell Tale Signs: Rare and Unreleased 1989–2006.

== Live performances ==
"Black Rider" received its live debut at the Riverside Theater in Milwaukee, Wisconsin on November 2, 2021, the first concert of Dylan's Rough and Rowdy Ways World Wide Tour. According to Dylan's official website, he has performed the song in concert 315 times as of June 2026.
