= I Contain Multitudes =

2020 single by Bob Dylan

Single by Bob Dylan

from the album Rough and Rowdy Ways
- Released: April 17, 2020
- Recorded: January and February 2020
- Studio: Sound City (Los Angeles)
- Genre: Folk
- Length: 4:36
- Label: Columbia
- Songwriter: Bob Dylan
- Producer: None listed

Bob Dylan singles chronology
"Murder Most Foul" (2020)	"I Contain Multitudes" (2020)	"False Prophet" (2020)

Rough and Rowdy Ways track listing
- 10 tracks: 1. "I Contain Multitudes"; 2. "False Prophet"; 3. "My Own Version of You"; 4. "I've Made Up My Mind to Give Myself to You"; 5. "Black Rider"; 6. "Goodbye Jimmy Reed"; 7. "Mother of Muses"; 8. "Crossing the Rubicon"; 9. "Key West (Philosopher Pirate)"; 10. "Murder Most Foul"

"I Contain Multitudes" is a song by the American singer-songwriter Bob Dylan, the opening track on his 39th studio album, Rough and Rowdy Ways (2020). It was released as the album's second single on April 17, 2020, through Columbia Records. The title of the song is taken from Section 51 of the poem "Song of Myself" by Walt Whitman.

The song was released, unannounced, less than a month after Dylan's previous single, "Murder Most Foul". The two singles were the first original material released by Dylan since his 2012 album Tempest. "I Contain Multitudes" reached number 5 on Billboard's Rock Digital Song Sales chart.

== Background and themes ==
Dylan has long been fascinated by the concept of the multiplicity of the self, evident in everything from his fondness for Arthur Rimbaud's phrase "Je est un autre" ("I is another"), which he said caused bells to go off when he first read it in the 1960s, to the lyrics of his Rastafari-influenced 1983 song "I and I". In an interview to promote Time Out of Mind in 1997, Dylan said, "I change during the course of a day. I wake and I'm one person, and when I go to sleep I know for certain I'm somebody else. I don't know who I am most of the time. It doesn't even matter to me".

A paraphrase of this last quote is spoken by Richard Gere's Billy the Kid character via voice-over narration in Todd Haynes' unconventional 2007 biopic I'm Not There (which features the subtitle "Inspired by the music and many lives of Bob Dylan" and takes Dylan's constantly-changing persona explicitly as its subject). Dylan's chameleon-like nature had caused critics to use Walt Whitman's line "I contain multitudes" in relation to him long before he ever wrote a song by that title. Dylan himself quoted the line in an interview for the 2019 documentary Rolling Thunder Revue: A Bob Dylan Story by Martin Scorsese.

== Lyrics ==
When asked about writing the song by historian Douglas Brinkley for an interview in The New York Times to promote the release of Rough and Rowdy Ways, Dylan noted that he "didn't really have to grapple much. It's the kind of thing where you pile up stream-of-consciousness verses and then leave it alone and come pull things out. In that particular song, the last few verses came first. So that's where the song was going all along. Obviously, the catalyst for the song is the title line. It's one of those where you write it on instinct. Kind of in a trance state. Most of my recent songs are like that. The lyrics are the real thing, tangible, they're not metaphors".

Brinkley also asked Dylan about the surprising inclusion of Anne Frank's name in the song, to which Dylan responded that Frank's story was "profound" before adding: "You could just as well ask, 'What made you decide to include Indiana Jones or the Rolling Stones'. The names themselves are not solitary. It's the combination of them that adds up to something more than their singular parts. To go too much into detail is irrelevant. The song is like a painting, you can't see it all at once if you're standing too close. The individual pieces are just part of a whole...Somewhere in the universe those three names must have paid a price for what they represent and they're locked together. And I can hardly explain that. Why or where or how, but those are the facts".

== Music ==
"I Contain Multitudes" is performed in the key of C major. Critics noted upon release of the single that there is a certain continuity when it is listened to alongside Dylan's previous single, "Murder Most Foul", which is performed in the same key (and that Rough and Rowdy Ways has a circular structure when listened to on repeat since they are the first and last tracks on the album, respectively). In all, there are six verses and two bridges, the latter of which are, according to Robert Dye in American Songwriter, "sung over a descending six-minor walkdown, contrasting with the dreamy feel of the verses and creating tension".

The song has a slow tempo and a sparse arrangement featuring multiple acoustic guitars, a pedal steel guitar and an upright bass played with a bow. It is notable for being the only song on Rough and Rowdy Ways to feature no percussion. Also similar to "Murder Most Foul" is Dylan's vocal performance, which Tony Attwood describes as "[walking] a fine line between talking and singing". When Dylan played Lotte Lenya's version of Kurt Weill and Bertolt Brecht's "Alabama Song" on the "Whiskey" episode of Theme Time Radio Hour, first broadcast in September 2020, he characterized her vocal technique as "sprechstimme", meaning half-spoken/half-sung, before humorously adding, "I use that sometimes myself".

== Release ==
The song was released unexpectedly on Dylan's YouTube channel on April 17, 2020, three weeks to the day after the stealth release of Dylan's previous single "Murder Most Foul". The YouTube video consists of the song accompanied by a still photograph of Dylan playing live in Salzburg, Austria that had been taken by Italian Dylan fan Andrea Orlandi in 1996 (a photograph that was also later included in one of the inner sleeves of the Rough and Rowdy Ways vinyl release). The single's release had been teased several hours before the song's premiere by a status update on Dylan's official Twitter account that featured the song title as a hashtag: #IContainMultitudes.

== Critical reception ==
While reviewing Rough and Rowdy Ways in his "Consumer Guide" column, Robert Christgau said the track "provides exactly the right thematic sendoff" within the context of the album's "elegiac retrospective". Mark Beaumont of NME called it a "sanguine personal exposé" and "a kind of literary folk 'My Way', a porch chair portrait of a life fully lived", in which Dylan "peels away the details of his journey with the grace and conciliation of a master making his peace".

Several critics have commented on Dylan's surprising use of humor in the song, including NPR's Lauren Onkey who noted that the lyrics contain "a list of sometimes funny (we often forget that Dylan is funny) and preposterous brags of the singer's power and prowess that evoke the blues", and USA Today's Patrick Ryan who, in an article about the "Best Songs of 2020", referred to it as both "cheeky" and "quietly heartbreaking".

Simon Vozick-Levinson, writing in a Rolling Stone article where the song placed 13th on a list of "The 25 Best Bob Dylan songs of the 21st Century", noted that it functions as a "bookend of sorts" to "Murder Most Foul" in that, in both, "Dylan seems to be considering his place in the constellation of great musicians and artists through the ages".

The Sydney Morning Herald named "I Contain Multitudes" one of the "Top five Bob Dylan songs" in a 2021 article, calling it a "paean to unassailable self-knowledge [that] is sung like a man at peace with every detail". Spectrum Culture included the song on a list of "Bob Dylan's 20 Best Songs of the '10s and Beyond".

The Pretenders' lead singer Chrissie Hynde told Rolling Stone that she found the song "fucking devastating" and that its release, along with the COVID-19 pandemic lockdown, inspired her to finally realize her ambition of recording a Dylan covers album. Robert Plant claimed that, upon first hearing it, he "just went, 'This is the story of all of our lives! Except he's taken the bends in a totally different way, the curves'", and claimed that being able to "voice somebody else's condition" in a similar fashion was more than he could imagine as a lyricist. Actress/singer Rita Wilson included the song on a Spotify playlist of her favorite romantic Bob Dylan songs when promoting her 2020 single "I Wanna Kiss Bob Dylan".

== Cultural references ==
As with "Murder Most Foul", "I Contain Multitudes" contains many references to other artists and works of art over the past few centuries. The line "I rollick and I frolic with all the young dudes...I contain multitudes", for example, is a reference to David Bowie's song "All the Young Dudes", which became a hit for Mott the Hoople in 1972. In an article about "I Contain Multitudes" at Forward, Seth Rogovoy suggested this particular line "could be read as a similar nod toward queerness contained in the Bowie-penned original".

The song also contains numerous references to Irish poetry and songs, in particular the work of W. B. Yeats, Antoine Ó Raifteirí and the song "Danny Boy". Although allusions to Irish poetry and song are nothing new in Dylan's work, some have speculated that these particular references may have been inspired by an evening Dylan spent in the company of fellow songwriter Shane MacGowan in Dublin while on tour in 2017.

The line "I live on the boulevard of crime" is a reference to the setting of Marcel Carne's 1945 film Children of Paradise, one of Dylan's all-time favorite movies. Children of Paradise was an influence on Dylan's Rolling Thunder Revue tour in 1975 and his 1978 film Renaldo and Clara, and he previously quoted a line from it ("Love is so simple") in the Blood on the Tracks song "You're a Big Girl Now".

The line "I carry four pistols and two large knives" is a reference to Ward Will Lamon, an overarmed bodyguard who accompanied Abraham Lincoln to his inauguration, as described in Shelby Foote's The Civil War: A Narrative. This is the first of six references to U.S. Presidents on Rough and Rowdy Ways (the other five of which come in the album's final two songs: "Key West (Philosopher Pirate)" and "Murder Most Foul").

== Live performances ==
"I Contain Multitudes" received its live debut at the Riverside Theater in Milwaukee, Wisconsin on November 2, 2021, the first concert of Dylan's Rough and Rowdy Ways World Wide Tour. According to Dylan's official website, he has performed the song in concert 308 times as of June 2026.

== Charts ==
Chart performance for "I Contain Multitudes"
Chart (2020)	Peak position
US Rock Digital Song Sales (Billboard)	5

== Accolades ==
Accolades for "I Contain Multitudes"
Publication	Accolade	Rank
The Sydney Morning Herald	Top Five Bob Dylan Songs	N/A
USA Today	10 Best Songs of 2020	7
Rolling Stone	The 25 Best Bob Dylan Songs of the 21st Century	13
Slate	20 Best Songs of 2020	N/A
Spectrum Culture	Bob Dylan's 20 Best Songs of the '10s and Beyond	N/A
The Los Angeles Times	50 Best Songs of 2020	N/A
Inside of Knoxville	25 Best Dylan Songs of the Last 25 Years	N/A
Spin	50 Best Songs of 2020 (So Far)	49

== Cover versions ==
The song was covered by Australian singer/songwriter Emma Swift on her 2020 album Blonde on the Tracks. Swift also played the song at a show in Nashville, Tennessee that was live streamed on YouTube in the summer of 2020.

Norwegian pop singer Sondre Lerche released a cover as a Christmas single on December 20, 2020, via Stereogum.
