= Ian Berry (photojournalist) =

British photojournalist (1934–2026)

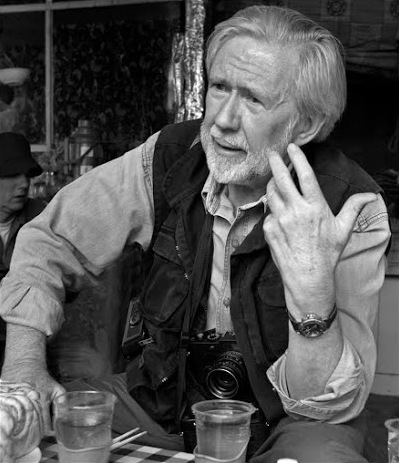
- Born: 4 April 1934; Preston, Lancashire, England
- Died: 13 September 2026 (aged 92); Salisbury, Wiltshire, England
- Occupation: Photojournalist

Ian Berry (4 April 1934 – 13 September 2026) was a British photojournalist with Magnum Photos. He made his reputation in South Africa, where he worked for the Daily Mail and later for Drum magazine. He was the only photographer to document the massacre at Sharpeville in 1960, and his photographs were used in the trial to prove the victims' innocence. Ian Berry was also invited by Henri Cartier-Bresson to join Magnum Photos in 1962 when he was based in Paris; five years later he became a full member.

== Life and career ==
Berry was born in Preston, Lancashire, England, on 4 April 1934. In 1953 moved to South Africa, where he learned the basics of photography, working under Roger Madden, a South African photographer who had been an assistant to Ansel Adams. After some time as an amateur photographer, Berry began photographing communities and weddings. During this period he met Jürgen Schadeberg, also a European immigrant and photographer. Schadeberg was offered a position with the new African Sunday newspaper eGoli but declined, recommending Berry for the position instead. After working there only 10 months, the newspaper closed, and Berry began working for the Benoni City Times, but he soon became more interested in freelance work.

He returned to Great Britain and traveled for some time but returned to South Africa in the early 1960s and worked for the Rand Daily Mail. Later Tom Hopkinson, previously editor of the British Picture Post, hired Berry to work for Drum magazine. He was in Sharpeville on 21 March 1960, when a peaceful protest turned violent, leading to the deaths of 69 people and the wounding of 178 others by police. Recent research has shown that the official police statistics underestimated the number of people killed and wounded at the Sharpeville Massacre. There were no other photographs documenting the event as it happened, and Berry's images were entered into evidence in the court proceedings proving that the victims had done nothing wrong and that the police had reloaded their weapons and fired on the crowd as people were running away. Photographs Berry made, as well as photographs made in the immediate aftermath of the massacre by photographers such as Alf Kumalo and Peter Magubane, played a key part in generating support for the international anti-apartheid movement. Berry was invited by Henri Cartier-Bresson to join Magnum Photos in 1962 when he was based in Paris; five years later he became a full member. In 1964 he moved to London and began working for Observer Magazine. He subsequently traveled the globe, documenting social and political strife in China, Republic of Congo, Czechoslovakia, Ethiopia, Israel, Ireland, Vietnam, and the former Soviet Union. He has contributed to publications including Esquire, Fortune, Geo, Life, National Geographic, Paris-Match, and Stern.

Berry's photographs have been exhibited world-wide and some are now included in the Magnum Photos Photography Collection at the Harry Ransom Center, University of Texas at Austin. Bob Dylan used one of his photos for the cover of his album Rough and Rowdy Ways.

Berry died at his home in Salisbury, England, on 13 September 2026, aged 92.

== Awards ==
- 1959: Nikon World Photo Contest Awards - 1st and 3rd
- 1959: British Press Pictures, Feature Photographer of Year Award
- 1960: British Press Pictures, Feature Photographer of Year Award
- 1969: Art Directors Club of New York Award
- 1974: Awarded British Arts Council's first major photographic bursary (led to his book, The English)
- 1977: Nikon Photographer of Year Award (first ever)
- 1981: 1981 Pix of Year, magazine news, Award from Missouri School of Journalism and National Press Photographers Association
- 1990: Made Honorary Fellow, University of Lancashire
- 1995: Made Honorary Fellow of the Royal Photographic Society
- 2005: National photography magazine award for lifetime achievement in photography

== Books ==
- The English, 1978.
- World Photography: 25 Great Photographers by Bryn Campbell, 1981.
- Black and Whites: L'Afrique du Sud with a foreword by François Mitterrand, 1988.
- Les Grands Travaux with Martine Franck and Rene Burri, France: RMN, 1989.
- In Our Time: The World As Seen by MAGNUM Photographers. W. W. Norton, 1990. ISBN 978-0-393-31129-7.
- Living Apart, text by Archbishop Desmond Tutu. Phaidon Press, 1996. ISBN 978-0-7148-3523-5.
- Ian Berry, I Grandi Fotografi, 2006.
- Mar: A Pesca en Galicia, 2008.
- Sold into Slavery, CDP editions, 2008. ISBN 978-2-35130-032-9.
