= I've Made Up My Mind to Give Myself to You =

2020 song by Bob Dylan

Song by Bob Dylan

from the album Rough and Rowdy Ways
- Released: June 19, 2020
- Recorded: January–February 2020
- Studio: Sound City (Los Angeles)
- Genre: Folk
- Length: 6:32
- Label: Columbia
- Songwriter: Bob Dylan
- Producer: None listed

Rough and Rowdy Ways track listing
- 10 tracks: 1. "I Contain Multitudes"; 2. "False Prophet"; 3. "My Own Version of You"; 4. "I've Made Up My Mind to Give Myself to You"; 5. "Black Rider"; 6. "Goodbye Jimmy Reed"; 7. "Mother of Muses"; 8. "Crossing the Rubicon"; 9. "Key West (Philosopher Pirate)"; 10. "Murder Most Foul"

"I've Made Up My Mind to Give Myself to You" is a song written and performed by the American singer-songwriter Bob Dylan and released as the fourth track on his 2020 album Rough and Rowdy Ways. The song is performed in 6/8 time and has a lilting melody that has caused some critics to compare it to a "lullaby".

It is the only song on the album to feature a guitar solo and one of only two songs (the other being "Key West (Philosopher Pirate)") to feature backing vocals.

== Composition and recording ==
The basic melody heard in the song's verses is closely based on Jacques Offenbach's barcarolle "Belle nuit, ô nuit d'amour" from his 1881 opera Tales of Hoffmann but the vocal melody that Dylan sings over it is original and he has also added a bridge. (Offenbach's famous barcarolle has also served as the inspiration for other popular songs including "Tonight is So Right For Love", which Elvis Presley sang in the 1960 film G.I. Blues, and 1968's "Please Don't Go", which features English lyrics by Les Reed and Jackie Rae.) In all, the song has six sung verses, three sung bridges and an instrumental bridge.

The hummed male backing vocals, rare for a Dylan studio recording, have been described by one critic as providing "Dylan’s voice with a beautiful soft feather bed, reminiscent of the Jordanaires’ quiet croon behind Elvis on "How Great Thou Art". Blake Mills' unusual percussive electric-guitar part has been misidentified by some critics as someone playing the steel drums or the marimba. Dylan scholar Laura Tenschert argued on the "Talkin' Dylan's Process" episode of the Definitely Dylan podcast that the rudimentary guitar solo played during the song's instrumental bridge was most likely played by Dylan himself. The song is performed in the key of D major.

== Themes ==
While critics have been nearly unanimous in claiming "devotion" to be the song's subject, there have been varying interpretations as to who or what the song's object is (only referred to as "you" by the first-person narrator). Many see "I've Made Up My Mind to Give Myself to You" as a romantic love ballad addressed to a specific individual: Augustus Welby calls it "as true a love song as you're ever likely to find", and several other critics have similarly seen it as a classic love song in the vein of Dylan's oft-covered "Make You Feel My Love" from 1997. But Chris Willman, writing in Variety, raises the possibility that the song could be seen as a "love letter" to Dylan's own fans, citing the lines "I'm giving myself to you, I am, from Salt Lake City to Birmingham / From East L.A. to San Antone, I don't think I could bear to spend my life alone" as possibly being addressed to "anyone who attended the Never Ending Tour". Still other critics see the song as having a spiritual aspect: Glide's Paul Haney, for instance, interprets lines about "the gospel of love" and hoping the "gods go easy with me" as an indication that the song could be about Dylan dedicating himself to a higher power.

== Reception ==
Amanda Petrusich, reviewing Rough and Rowdy Ways in the New Yorker, has cited the song as her favorite on the album. She characterizes it as a "gentle ballad about deliberately resigning oneself to love and its demands" and notes that, while it's "not the album's richest or most complicated song", its "evocation of a certain kind of golden-hour melancholy" makes it eminently re-listenable.

In an essay on Rough and Rowdy Ways in his book Outtakes on Bob Dylan, Michael Gray also named "I've Made Up My Mind to Give Myself to You" as his favorite song on the album. He credits Dylan's vocal for the way it "holds so wide a range of feeling across the song" and the lyrics for "such sweet, acute, specific touches" as the way Dylan juxtaposes the phrase "I'm sittin' on my terrace" (the word "terrace", Gray notes, "enfolds terra, as in terra firma") with "lost in the stars" in the opening line.

Spectrum Culture included the song on a list of "Bob Dylan's 20 Best Songs of the '10s and Beyond". In an article accompanying the list, critic Jacob Nierenberg described the song thusly: "Waltzing and hymnlike, it sounds closer to the pop standards that Dylan spent much of this decade putting his spin on than it does his usual brew of blues and folk; the backing vocals are intimate and deeply affecting, as are Dylan’s own, so much so that it feels like he’s holding the very person he’s singing to in his arms. When he croons 'I’ll lay down beside you when everyone’s gone', it might be the most unguarded and romantic thing he’s sung since 'Sara'”.

Drew Warrick, writing about the track in The Michigan Daily, claims that Dylan "hasn't sounded this sharp in decades", calling his vocal "a cavernous croon that soars with genuine affection" and noting that Dylan's "Sinatra phase", in which he spent years singing traditional pop standards live and in the studio, had "paid off". A staff reviewer at Mojo agreed, describing the song as "gorgeous" and praising "the vulnerable lead vocal" for being "a refutation of the myth that [Dylan] can no longer nail pure melody".

The Fiery Furnaces singer Eleanor Friedberger cited it as her favorite Dylan song in a 2021 Guardian article in which she wrote, "Dylan writes super-beautiful, romantic love songs. This one is a travelling song, and he does something that I’ve stolen and mentions specific place names, which makes it real and relatable. We don’t think of Dylan as vulnerable, but he lays himself on the line. He’s world-weary, and his delivery is so languid as he stretches out the words. He was almost 80, and made an album just as great as the ones he made decades ago".

NJArts critic Jay Lustig identified it as his favorite song on Rough and Rowdy Ways, calling it one of Dylan's "loveliest love songs". A 2021 article at Inside of Knoxville listed it as one of the "25 Best Dylan Songs from the Last 25 Years".

Actress/singer Rita Wilson included the song on a Spotify playlist of her favorite romantic Bob Dylan songs when promoting her single "I Wanna Kiss Bob Dylan".

== Cultural references ==
The line "If I had the wings of a snow-white dove" is likely a reference to the nearly identical opening line of Bob Ferguson's country/gospel song "Wings of a Dove", famously sung on camera by Robert Duvall in his Academy Award-winning performance in the 1983 film Tender Mercies.

== Live performances ==
"I've Made Up My Mind to Give Myself to You" received its live debut at the Riverside Theater in Milwaukee, Wisconsin on November 2, 2021, the first concert of Dylan's Rough and Rowdy Ways World Wide Tour. According to Dylan's official website, he has performed the song in concert 316 times as of June 2026.

== Cover versions ==
Australian singer-songwriter Emma Swift covered the song during a concert in Nashville, Tennessee that was live-streamed on YouTube in the summer of 2020.

Canadian band Cowboy Junkies covered it for Uncut magazine's Dylan Revisited covers album in 2021, a performance that Variety ranked as the 17th best Bob Dylan cover of all time. This version appears on the band's album Songs of the Recollection.

American singer-songwriter Trapper Schoepp, who shares a co-writing credit with Dylan on "On, Wisconsin" (a song Dylan began in 1961 and Schoepp completed in 2018), released a cover of "I've Made Up My Mind to Give Myself to You" as a single on May 24, 2021.

English cabaret singer Barb Jungr covered it live in 2021 in a version that has been called disarming for its "heart aching simplicity".
