= Crossing the Rubicon (song) =

2020 song by Bob Dylan

Song by Bob Dylan

from the album Rough and Rowdy Ways
- Released: June 19, 2020
- Recorded: January–February 2020
- Studio: Sound City (Los Angeles)
- Genre: Blues
- Length: 7:22
- Label: Columbia
- Songwriter: Bob Dylan
- Producer: None listed

Rough and Rowdy Ways track listing
- 10 tracks: 1. "I Contain Multitudes"; 2. "False Prophet"; 3. "My Own Version of You"; 4. "I've Made Up My Mind to Give Myself to You"; 5. "Black Rider"; 6. "Goodbye Jimmy Reed"; 7. "Mother of Muses"; 8. "Crossing the Rubicon"; 9. "Key West (Philosopher Pirate)"; 10. "Murder Most Foul"

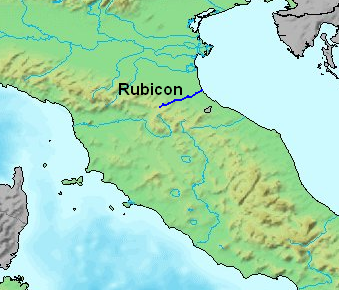
The modern Rubicon river (dark blue), believed to be the same river crossed by Caesar

"Crossing the Rubicon" is a song written and performed by the American singer-songwriter Bob Dylan and released as the eighth track on his 2020 album Rough and Rowdy Ways. It is a slow electric blues featuring lyrics that heavily reference classical antiquity and the life of Julius Caesar in particular.

== Background and composition ==
Making allusions to and appropriating phrases from the literature and cultures of Ancient Greece and Ancient Rome has been an important part of Dylan's songwriting process in the 21st century (beginning with a single quotation from Virgil's Aeneid in his 2001 song "Lonesome Day Blues" from Love and Theft). These references, as charted by historian and Harvard Latinist Richard F. Thomas in his 2017 book Why Bob Dylan Matters, have become more frequent and prominent in Dylan's original songs over time, culminating with Rough and Rowdy Ways featuring two songs that use classical antiquity explicitly as their subjects (as evidenced by their titles): "Mother of Muses" and "Crossing the Rubicon". It was likely intentional on Dylan's part for these two songs to be sequenced next to each other on the album.

Musically, "Crossing the Rubicon" resembles Dylan's earlier blues songs "Million Miles" from 1997's Time Out of Mind, and "Cry a While" from 2001's Love and Theft. In the 2022 edition of their book Bob Dylan All the Songs: The Story Behind Every Track, authors Philippe Margotin and Jean-Michel Guesdon claim that the song is "treading in the footsteps of Jimmy Reed and John Lee Hooker" but note that it has "quite unusual lyrics for this musical style". The song is performed in the key of C major.

== Themes ==
The expression "to cross the Rubicon" is a metaphor meaning to "to take an irrevocable step that commits one to a specific course". The phrase has its origin in Julius Caesar's decision to cross the Rubicon river in 49 BCE, bringing his troops from Gaul into Italy and starting a five-year civil war that ended the Roman Republic and began the Roman Empire. The decision sealed Caesar's political future as he was declared "dictator for life" at war's end. In the song, Dylan seems to use the refrain "And I crossed the Rubicon" in both a figurative as well as a literal sense (i.e., he is singing in the first person as Caesar). The first-person narrators of two other songs on Rough and Rowdy Ways also mention either identifying with or being Caesar: "My Own Version of You" ("I pick a number between one and two / And ask myself what would Julius Caesar do") and "Key West (Philosopher Pirate)" ("Got my right hand high with the thumb down").

The opening line of the song ("I crossed the Rubicon on the 14th day of the most dangerous month of the year") is interesting in that it references not the day Caesar actually did cross the Rubicon river (which was the 10th of January) but rather, according to Richard F. Thomas, the 14th day of "what for Julius Caesar was emphatically the most dangerous month, March, whose Ides of course fell on the next day, his death day". Thomas sees this reference to Caesar's murder as significant in that it positions "Crossing the Rubicon" as the first song of "the closing epic triad of the album, each founded on political assassination": Julius Caesar (44 BCE) in "Crossing the Rubicon", followed by William McKinley (1901) in Key West (Philosopher Pirate) and John F. Kennedy (1963) in "Murder Most Foul" (with "Mother of Muses" serving the important structural function of being the "epic invocation" to this triad).

== Critical reception ==
Carl Wilson, writing at Slate, called the song "a diss-track/battle-rap/crawling-kingsnake number in which, like several times here, Dylan imagines himself as a strutting ancient Roman general, promising, 'I'll make your wife a widow / You'll never see old age'". Variety's Chris Willman also compared the song to hip-hop, calling it "Every Grain of Sand" meets "gangsta rap" for the way it alternates between murderous boasts and spiritual observations such as "I feel the Holy Spirit inside, see the light that freedom gives / I believe it's in the reach of every man who lives". Anne Margaret Daniel, writing at Hot Press, calls the "one-two punch" of "Crossing the Rubicon" and "Key West (Philosopher Pirate)" "my favourite section of Rough and Rowdy Ways. Were the record an epic poem construction, I'd say these are my favourite books. Both are long songs, telling stories, giving and taking, promising and threatening, cautionary and yet comforting".

Spectrum Culture included the song on a list of "Bob Dylan's 20 Best Songs of the '10s and Beyond". In an article accompanying the list, critic Pat Padua observes that the title's reference to passing a point of no return seems to echo the title of D. A. Pennebaker 1967 Dylan documentary Dont Look Back. Padua notes that while the film functions as a "profile of a young star at his peak of fame; the resonance here, when it's 'darkest before the dawn', is that of an old man looking back at his youthful arrogance and realizing it's time to pay his dues. So Dylan's biblical visions appear in almost every verse: 'purgatory', 'heaven and earth'. He's misbehaved, and he has regrets...He takes on all this in the ancient form of the blues, his grizzled voice like that of an old country bluesman worried about the troubled life he's lived".

A 2021 WhatCulture article on the "10 Most Underrated Bob Dylan Songs" placed "Crossing the Rubicon" at #9, noting that the singer has "not been so lithe on the mic for many a year, perhaps since 'Stuck Inside of Mobile'-era word salad Dylan. He postures, throws out threats, conjures violent images, and sounds like he’s having a blast doing it". A 2021 article at Inside of Knoxville listed it as one of the "25 Best Dylan Songs from the Last 25 Years".

== Cultural references ==
The second verse describes the Rubicon as being the "Red river...redder than the blood that flows from the rose". Richard F. Thomas sees this as a reference to a verse by the Latin poet Lucan who, before being forced to commit suicide by Nero, wrote: "The bright red river Rubicon flows from modest spring through the bottom of a valley, valleys, dividing Gaul from Italian lands". Thomas believes that the "redness" described by both Lucan and Dylan is a poetic reference to the waters being bloodied by the civil war after the Rubicon had been crossed by Julius Caesar.

The line "I painted my wagon - I abandoned all hope and I crossed the Rubicon" humorously juxtaposes a reference to Lerner and Loewe's 1951 western-musical Paint Your Wagon with an oft-quoted line from Dante's Inferno. Anne Margaret Daniel asks who else but Dylan would yoke two such references together and calls the result "downright multitudinous".

The song's penultimate line, "The killing frost is on the ground and the autumn leaves are gone", references the 1946 song "Autumn Leaves", which Dylan recorded for his 2015 album Shadows in the Night and which subsequently became his most frequently played cover song ever.

== Live performances ==
The live debut of "Crossing the Rubicon" took place at the Arizona Federal Theatre in Phoenix, Arizona on March 3, 2022, the first show of the second leg of Dylan's Rough and Rowdy Ways World Wide Tour. In a Rolling Stone article, Andy Greene saw this performance of a song about "a bloody civil war" as Dylan possibly commenting on the "ongoing war between Russia and Ukraine". According to Dylan's official website, he has performed the song in concert 296 times as of June 2026.
