= Goodbye Jimmy Reed =

2020 song by Bob Dylan

Song by Bob Dylan

from the album Rough and Rowdy Ways
- Released: June 19, 2020
- Recorded: January–February 2020
- Studio: Sound City (Los Angeles)
- Genre: Blues
- Length: 4:13
- Label: Columbia
- Songwriter: Bob Dylan
- Producer: None listed

Rough and Rowdy Ways track listing
- 10 tracks: 1. "I Contain Multitudes"; 2. "False Prophet"; 3. "My Own Version of You"; 4. "I've Made Up My Mind to Give Myself to You"; 5. "Black Rider"; 6. "Goodbye Jimmy Reed"; 7. "Mother of Muses"; 8. "Crossing the Rubicon"; 9. "Key West (Philosopher Pirate)"; 10. "Murder Most Foul"

"Goodbye Jimmy Reed" is an uptempo blues song written and performed by the American singer-songwriter Bob Dylan and released as the sixth track on his 2020 album Rough and Rowdy Ways. A tribute to blues giant Jimmy Reed, the song has been singled out for praise by critics for being the most raucous number on an album otherwise predominated by quieter, slow-to-mid-tempo songs, and for playful lyrics that deliberately juxtapose "the sacred and the profane".

It is the only song on the album on which Dylan plays harmonica and his first such studio performance since he recorded "The Christmas Blues" for his album Christmas in the Heart in 2009.

== Background and composition ==
Dylan has long admired Jimmy Reed, covering "Baby What You Want Me to Do" during the Infidels sessions in 1983 (an outtake of which was officially released on The Bootleg Series Vol. 16: Springtime in New York 1980–1985 in 2021) and again with Tom Petty and the Heartbreakers during rehearsals for Farm Aid in 1985 (a video recording of which is extant); and he played "Bright Lights, Big City" as a duet with Eric Clapton at a live concert in New York City in 1999. The music for "Goodbye Jimmy Reed", however, is closer to Dylan's own mid-1960s output, the song "Leopard-Skin Pill-Box Hat" in particular, than anything Reed ever recorded. Dylan scholar Tony Attwood notes that the song begins with an electric guitar intro that is just "three beats long" (i.e., shorter than what one would expect from a traditional rhythm and blues song) and that this "unexpected" three-beat bar continues to occur as a turnaround between each verse in the song. The song is performed in the key of A major.

Lyrically, "Goodbye Jimmy Reed" is similar to previous Dylan songs "Blind Willie McTell" and "High Water (For Charley Patton)" in that it pays tribute to the titular blues singer indirectly. Aside from the "Goodbye Jimmy Reed" refrain, there are only two overt references to Reed in the song: The line "I had nothing to fight with but a butcher's hook" alludes to Reed's time working at the Armour meat-packing plant in Chicago, and the line "Can't you hear me calling from down in Virginia?" refers to Reed's 1969 album Down in Virginia (featuring a song by the same title written by his wife Mary Lee Reed). The lyrics are notable for mixing references to religion ("For thine is the kingdom, the power and the glory / Go tell it on the mountain, go tell the real story") with sexual innuendo ("Transparent woman in a transparent dress / Suits you well, I must confess") and double entendre ("I'll break open your grapes / I'll suck out the juice"). Dylan may have intended these juxtapositions to be a commentary on the "Saturday night vs. Sunday morning" dichotomy between the blues and the genre that is its closest kin: gospel music.

== Critical reception ==
Writing in The New York Times, historian Douglas Brinkley called the song a "high-octane showstopper" that honors Reed with "dragon-fierce harmonica riffs and bawdy lyrics". Critic Ann-Margaret Daniel, in a review of Rough and Rowdy Ways at Hot Press, noted that the song is "a romping, glorious, boogying hello, more than it is a fare thee well". Rolling Stone's Rob Sheffield called it a "raw blues stomp" in which Dylan proves to be "a master of comic timing". Dylan scholar Stephen Scobie wrote in an online essay that one "could write a whole textbook on sexual pathology" based on three lines from the song (including "I can't play the record 'cause my needle got stuck", which Scobie interprets as an impotence metaphor), and claimed that, of all the songs on the album, "this is the one that most begs to be unleashed in [live] performance".

In the 2022 edition of their book Bob Dylan All the Songs: The Story Behind Every Track, authors Philippe Margotin and Jean-Michel Guesdon call the song "a superb 'blues shuffle'" and claim that it comes close to the "spirit" of Jimmy Reed through "precise guitar playing, a rather clear sound, a rhythm with a communicative groove, and some brief interventions on the harmonica".

A 2022 article at Ultimate Classic Rock identified the song as the best on Rough and Rowdy Ways: "If you listened to nothing else on the album but 'Goodbye Jimmy Reed', a foot-tapping tribute to the late blues guitarist, you'll come away with inevitable knowledge: Dylan, in his 80th decade of life and 60th of music-making, has still got it".

== Accolades ==
In a list that has circulated widely online, former President Barack Obama named "Goodbye Jimmy Reed" as one of his favorite songs of 2020. The staff of NPR's World Cafe likewise included it on a playlist of the "Best Songs of 2020". It was the only song from Rough and Rowdy Ways on either list.

== Cultural references ==
Two lyrics in the song refer to 19th-century hymns: "Give me that old time religion, it's just what I need" is a reference to the traditional gospel song, "Old-Time Religion" (with its repeated chorus of "Give me that old-time religion"), and "Go tell it on the mountain, go tell the real story" refers to the African-American spiritual "Go Tell It on the Mountain".

The line "For thine is the kingdom, the power and the glory" is a quote from the Lord's Prayer.

In an online essay, Niall Brennan has argued that the song is actually studded with hidden references to the life and career of Dylan's friend Van Morrison. He cites, as examples, the song's opening line ("I live on a street named after a saint"), which seemingly echoes a sentence in Johnny Rogan's 2005 biography, Van Morrison: No Surrender: "Catholics all went to schools named after saints and Protestants went to schools named after streets"; as well as the use of the word "Proddy", a derogatory term for a Protestant as termed by Irish Catholics.

Dylan scholar Laura Tenschert has pointed out another decidedly non-American source for one of the lyrics: "God be with you, brother dear / If you don't mind me asking what brings you here?" is a close paraphrase of a couple of lines from Act 2, Scene 2 of Les Femmes Savantes by Molière (as translated by Richard Wilbur).

== Live performances ==
"Goodbye Jimmy Reed" received its live debut at the Riverside Theater in Milwaukee, Wisconsin on November 2, 2021, the first concert of Dylan's Rough and Rowdy Ways World Wide Tour. According to Dylan's official website, he has performed the song in concert 307 times as of June 2026.

== Notable cover ==
Elvis Costello covered the song live on his Spring 2025 U.S. tour of North America with Steve Nieve.
