= Murder Most Foul (song) =

2020 single by Bob Dylan

Single by Bob Dylan

from the album Rough and Rowdy Ways
- Released: March 27, 2020
- Recorded: February 2020
- Studio: Sound City (Los Angeles)
- Genre: Folk, chamber folk
- Length: 16:56
- Label: Columbia
- Songwriter: Bob Dylan

Bob Dylan singles chronology
"Wigwam" (2013)	"Murder Most Foul" (2020)	"I Contain Multitudes" (2020)

Rough and Rowdy Ways track listing
- 10 tracks: 1. "I Contain Multitudes"; 2. "False Prophet"; 3. "My Own Version of You"; 4. "I've Made Up My Mind to Give Myself to You"; 5. "Black Rider"; 6. "Goodbye Jimmy Reed"; 7. "Mother of Muses"; 8. "Crossing the Rubicon"; 9. "Key West (Philosopher Pirate)"; 10. "Murder Most Foul"

"Murder Most Foul" is a song by American singer-songwriter Bob Dylan, the 10th and final track on his 39th studio album, Rough and Rowdy Ways (2020). It was released as the album's lead single on March 27, 2020, through Columbia Records. The song addresses the assassination of John F. Kennedy in the wider context of American political and cultural history. Lasting 16 minutes, 56 seconds, it is the longest song he has ever released, eclipsing 1997's "Highlands" which runs for 16 minutes, 31 seconds.

In a statement released with the single, Dylan indicated that "Murder Most Foul" was a gift to fans for their support and loyalty over the years. The song's title comes from a line in Hamlet. In addition to members of Dylan's touring band, the song also features Fiona Apple and Alan Pasqua both playing piano.

The song was the first original music Dylan had released since 2012 and generated an enormous amount of commentary.

== Background ==
Stanley J. Marks' pamphlet on the Kennedy assassination, self-published in 1967

Dylan began his career as a professional musician during the Kennedy administration and imagined having a humorous telephone conversation with the President in "I Shall Be Free", the closing song on his 1963 album The Freewheelin' Bob Dylan. Dylan told his early biographer Anthony Scaduto, however, that he was not particularly devastated by Kennedy's assassination:

I didn't feel it any more than anybody else. We were all sensitive to it. The assassination took more of the shape of a happening. I read about those things happening to Lincoln, to Garfield, and that it could happen in this day and age was not too far-fetched. It didn't knock the wind out of me. Of course, I felt as rotten as everyone else. But if I was more sensitive about it than anyone else, I would have written a song about it, wouldn't I? The whole thing about my reactions to the assassination is overplayed.

Yet Scaduto countered that, despite Dylan's denial,

the murder did have an enormous effect on him. He signaled that feeling to very close friends, and a couple of weeks after Kennedy's death, Dylan gave a disastrous speech that indicated how much the assassination had troubled him. He went to the grand ballroom of the Hotel Americana in New York to accept the Tom Paine Award of the Emergency Civil Liberties Committee for his work in the civil rights campaign.

In his highly controversial acceptance speech, given on December 13, 1963, an intoxicated Dylan admitted that he "saw some of myself" in Lee Harvey Oswald before he was booed and rushed from the stage. The speech was met with hysteria from the press, which led to Dylan issuing a written statement in which he clarified his comments without apologizing.

== Composition and recording ==
When asked by historian Douglas Brinkley in an interview that appeared in The New York Times on June 12, 2020, if he had wanted to write a song about John F. Kennedy "for a long time", Dylan replied, "I'm not aware of ever wanting to write a song about J.F.K." then reminded Brinkley that "Murder Most Foul" is about a crime, not a politician. When asked if he intended the song to express nostalgia, Dylan replied, "I don't think of 'Murder Most Foul' as a glorification of the past or some kind of send-off to a lost age. It speaks to me in the moment. It always did, especially when I was writing the lyrics out".

Dylan scholar and musicologist Eyolf Ostrem notes in an essay on his website that while the song may give a first impression of being musically "formless", it is actually "strictly structured". According to Ostrem, it consists of five "great verses", four of which end with the lyrical refrain of "murder most foul" and each of which consists of "2 - 6 smaller verses". Ostrem notes that the song brings to fruition a musical quest that Dylan has been on for the entire 21st century: It features an "extended refrain structure" that he first experimented with in 2003's "'Cross the Green Mountain", an epic song with no true musical refrain; "just occasional verses with a slightly different chord sequence, interspersed between the regular verses". Ostrem also cites the Modern Times songs "Workingman's Blues #2" and "Nettie Moore" as having a similar construction. "Murder Most Foul" is performed in the key of C major.

Fiona Apple and Alan Pasqua both recorded their piano parts for the song in a single day. Apple told Dylan she "was really insecure" about playing on the track but that Dylan "was really encouraging and nice. He was just like, 'You're not here to be perfect, you're here to be you'". Pasqua said of the session in a 2020 interview: "I told Bob: 'This is like [John Coltrane's] 'A Love Supreme!' He just kind of looked at me without saying anything, but it really is like A Love Supreme to me. 'Murder Most Foul' is so profound and I get a lot of enjoyment out of making music with him. He transcends any musical genre. It's not rock, or folk, or pop. It's just Bob, man". In 2021, Pasqua compared the final mix to "the early days of stereo" and clarified that Benmont Tench's organ is on the left channel, Apple's piano is in the middle and Pasqua's own piano is on the right.

== Themes ==
Some commentators have interpreted the song as Dylan asserting that the assassination of John F. Kennedy was the result of a conspiracy of individuals and not Lee Harvey Oswald acting alone. Other critics, and some of Dylan's fellow artists, however, have said that, in spite of the specificity of many of the lyrics (e.g., "They blew off his head while he was still in the car"), "Murder Most Foul" ultimately seems to be less about the assassination of John F. Kennedy than the cathartic power of art in times of collective trauma. According to John Barry of the Poughkeepsie Journal, this made the song a particularly fitting release in the early days of lockdowns precipitated by the COVID-19 pandemic: "Framing the lyrical narrative of 'Murder Most Foul' is the assassination of Kennedy, which is perhaps Dylan's reminder that we are turning the coronavirus corner right now and things will never be the same, just as the world turned a corner when Kennedy was shot on Nov. 22, 1963".

Dylan's fellow songwriter Nick Cave elaborated on the song's ability to provide comfort during the particular historical moment in which it was released: "Dylan's relentless cascade of song references points to our potential as human beings to create beautiful things, even in the face of our own capacity for malevolence. 'Murder Most Foul' reminds us that all is not lost, as the song itself becomes a lifeline thrown into our current predicament. The instrumentation is formless and fluid and very beautiful. Lyrically it has all the perverse daring and playfulness of many of Dylan's great songs, but beyond that there is something within his voice that feels extraordinarily comforting, especially at this moment. It is as though it has traveled a great distance, through stretches of time, full of an earned integrity and stature that soothes in the way of a lullaby, a chant, or a prayer".

== Release ==
Bob Dylan
(@bobdylan)
tweeted:

Greetings to my fans and followers with gratitude for all your support and loyalty across the years. This is an unreleased song we recorded a while back that you might find interesting. Stay safe, stay observant and may God be with you. Bob Dylan

March 27, 2020

The song was released unexpectedly at the beginning of the COVID-19 pandemic on March 27, 2020, on Dylan's YouTube channel. The video consists of the song playing in its entirety accompanied by the still image of a cropped, black-and-white photograph of Kennedy that had originally been taken by Louis Fabian Bachrach Jr.; the background behind Kennedy was tinted in sepia. Dylan issued a statement on his website and via social media on the day that the single premiered calling it "an unreleased song we recorded a while back that you might find interesting". This spurred speculation that the recording may have been years old and perhaps even an outtake from his 2012 album Tempest. Fiona Apple later confirmed, however, that the song had in fact been recorded only one month previously, in February 2020.

"Murder Most Foul" received radio airplay in spite of its extreme length. In an interview with Billboard, Bruce Warren, program director of WXPN in Philadelphia, said, "It's an instant Dylan epic. We had no concerns about playing it at all". This sentiment was echoed by Jim McGuinn, program director at KCMP in Minneapolis, who said, "I wasn't concerned at all. Our audience expects a bit of the unexpected. It's a wild ride, with Bob backed by a simple, alternating chord pattern. And we're in Minnesota...he's our favorite son". Billboard noted that helping the song's cause was the "adult album alternative" radio format: "As non-commercial outlets, they don't need to worry about breaking for lengthy sets of ads, so even a song that runs over a quarter of an hour fits snugly into an almost nonstop musical flow".

== Critical response and legacy ==
National Public Radio (NPR) described the song as "unfold[ing] slowly over a delicate instrumental backing of violin, piano and hushed percussion. Dylan's vocal is rich and expressive as he veers between describing the assassination, the unfolding of the counterculture, and a roll call of musicians, movie lyrics and other pop culture references" and felt the song was "Dylan at his most incisive and cutting". NPR concluded that "Murder Most Foul" was "worth many repeated listens and will occupy any Dylanologist holed up at home". Ann Powers and Bob Boilen of NPR analysed the song and identified over 70 songs referenced in the work.

Writing in The Guardian, Ben Beaumont-Thomas felt that the song described Kennedy's assassination in "stark terms, imagining Kennedy being led to the slaughter like a sacrificial lamb ... 'they blew off his head while he was still in the car / shot down like a dog in broad daylight'" and that Dylan created an "epic portrait of an America in decline ever since" with a form of salvation available in popular music with references to the Beatles, Woodstock and Altamont festivals, the rock-opera Tommy by the Who, Charlie Parker, Guitar Slim, Don Henley, Glenn Frey, Warren Zevon, Stevie Nicks, Lindsey Buckingham, Little Walter, Carl Wilson, Queen and others.

Jeff Slate, for NBC News wrote "It's also virtually devoid of melody, and unlike anything Dylan has ever released, with Dylan essentially delivering his spoken-word, stream of consciousness lyrics on top of a sparse accompaniment of piano, violin and light percussion." Rolling Stone Deputy Music Editor Simon Voznik-Levinson praised the release, stating the song "is really about the ways that music can comfort us in times of national trauma. [...] For those of us who often turn to Dylan's catalog for that very purpose, 'Murder Most Foul' has arrived at the right time." A brief review by Jesse Hassenger of The A.V. Club praised the combination of gritty vocals with haunting instrumentation.

Kevin Dettmar of The New Yorker was less enthusiastic, calling the song "weird" and the first half "disappointing", explaining that "all the clichés aren't adding up to much". Dettmar continued, however, in a more favorable tone, saying that after the first ten minutes "something amazing happens: Wolfman Jack shows up and starts to play tracks". He stated that the last seven minutes of the song closely resembles a playlist "from one of the Theme Time Radio Hour shows that Dylan hosted from 2006 to 2009." The second half of the song makes reference to Warren Smith's "Uranium Rock", a song Dylan used to cover in his live shows in the mid-1980s; Billy Joel; and the Kingston Trio's "Tom Dooley" from 1958. Dettmar admired the "ecumenicism" of the playlist the song has become, mentioning the Eagles, Fleetwood Mac, Stan Getz, Patsy Cline, the Everly Brothers, John Lee Hooker, the Animals and the Who. He continued, "The song itself becomes self-referential by including itself in the body of American song by which American history has not only been created, but also preserved: Play 'Love Me or Leave Me', by the great Bud Powell; Play 'The Blood-Stained Banner', play 'Murder Most Foul'".

Salon's David Masciotra wrote a long, positive review that included reaching out to author David Talbot, who has written about the American intelligence community as well as the Kennedy family. Craig Jenkins of Vulture wrote that the song "couldn't be more prescient" and stated that the song can be part of unifying Americans in a time of crisis.

While reviewing Rough and Rowdy Ways in his "Consumer Guide" column, Robert Christgau said the track "sums up the musical grave-robbing Dylan has been transmuting into original art for 60 years now" while providing "an apt summum" to the album's "elegiac retrospective", "despite its excessive length and portentous isolation on the CD package". He concluded that, within the context of the album, it is "both an elegy for and a celebration of all the dark betrayals, stunted gains, enduring pleasures, and ecstatic releases of an American era Dylan has inflected as undeniably as any artist even if he doesn't understand it any better than you, me, or whoever killed imperfect vessel JFK".

Rolling Stone placed the song fifth on a list of the 25 "Best Bob Dylan Songs of the 21st Century". In an article accompanying the list, Simon Vozick-Levinson addressed the song in the context of Dylan's having won the Nobel Prize in Literature in 2016: "The specific names he asks the late Wolfman Jack to play on his cosmic radio hour are less important than the sheer quantity of them. It's as if the Nobel Prize made Dylan want to extend that same respect to every other popular musician whose work deserves to be canonized. As the final verses roll on, he sounds like he's naming every song he can before we forget them, inscribing them all in a Book of Life expressed in the form of a midnight playlist".

In his "Real Life Rock Top 10" column at the Los Angeles Review of Books, Greil Marcus wrote a lengthy analysis of the media feeding frenzy that had surrounded the song's release, comparing it to a landmark album release from the '60s: "Like the release of the Beatles' Sgt. Pepper's Lonely Hearts Club Band in 1967, a one-record pop explosion, where a record appears and in an instant it can feel as if the whole world is listening, talking back, figuring it out, and playing with it as if it's a cross between the Bible and Where's Waldo?. In the strange way the song can hardly be heard once without sparking anyone's need to hear it again, a world gathering around a campfire of unanswered questions, and it takes everyone around the campfire to hear the whole song".

In the 2022 edition of their book Bob Dylan All the Songs: The Story Behind Every Track, authors Philippe Margotin and Jean-Michel Guesdon compare the song to Dylan's earlier epic "Desolation Row" and claim that it "will remain as one of the most important works in his repertoire".

== Response of other artists ==
In addition to being widely acclaimed by critics, "Murder Most Foul" has also been highly praised by many of Dylan's fellow artists, including Neil Young, who called it a "masterpiece", Chrissie Hynde, who said, "It really knocked me sideways", Nick Cave, who called it one of Dylan's "great songs", PJ Harvey, who referred to it as Dylan's "best work," Iggy Pop, who cited it as one of the highlights of the "album of the year", and Elvis Costello and Margo Price, both of whom said it brought them to tears.

Bruce Springsteen called the song "timely and epic" after playing it on the fifth installment of his SiriusXM satellite radio show, From His Home to Yours. The episode revolved around the theme of social change.

Todd Haynes, director of the Dylan biopic I'm Not There, praised the song by saying "I was just like: how can he just continue to do work at that level?"

Stereogum ran an article to coincide with Dylan's 80th birthday on May 24, 2021, in which 80 musicians were asked to name their favorite Dylan song. David Byrne, Pulp's Jarvis Cocker, Ride's Andy Bell and Devendra Banhart all selected "Murder Most Foul".

== Cultural references ==
By referring to the day Kennedy was assassinated as a "day that will live on in infamy", Dylan is paraphrasing Franklin D. Roosevelt's famous speech after the attack on Pearl Harbor in 1941. Dylan seems to be creating a link between two disparate events of national tragedy while also adding Roosevelt to the list of U.S. Presidents referred to on Rough and Rowdy Ways (along with Kennedy and Lyndon B. Johnson in "Murder Most Foul", William McKinley and Harry S. Truman in "Key West (Philosopher Pirate)" and Abraham Lincoln in "I Contain Multitudes").

The line "There's three bums comin' all dressed in rags" refers to the "three tramps" who were photographed by several Dallas-area photojournalists shortly after the assassination of JFK and who became the subject of conspiracy theories about being involved in the killing.

The line "Living in a nightmare on Elm Street" refers to the street on which Kennedy was shot as well as Wes Craven's 1984 film A Nightmare on Elm Street, one of several horror movies alluded to in the lyrics (along with The Wolf Man and The Invisible Man).

As with "I Contain Multitudes", there are many references to other artists and works of art through the ages in "Murder Most Foul", which has been called "the Wikipedia of Rock & Roll". The line "When you're down on Deep Ellum put your money in your shoe" is a quote from the blues song "Deep Ellum Blues". Deep Ellum is the name of the entertainment district in Dallas that hosted many jazz and blues giants in the 1920s and over the next several decades (including Dylan's heroes Robert Johnson, Lead Belly and Blind Willie Johnson). Elm Street, on which Kennedy was shot, is the neighborhood's main thoroughfare and the origin of its name.

The line "And play it for Carl Wilson, too / Lookin' far, far away down Gower Avenue" is actually a reference to Warren Zevon's 1976 single "Desperados Under the Eaves". Beach Boy Wilson sang backing vocals on that track and his voice is "particularly audible" on the closing refrain ("Look away down Gower Avenue, look away").

The line "Take me back to Tulsa to the scene of the crime" contains an obvious reference to "Take Me Back to Tulsa", one of the signature songs of the western swing band Bob Wills and His Texas Playboys. Some critics believe that Dylan's addition of "to the scene of the crime", however, may be a secondary reference to the Tulsa race massacre in 1921, a national tragedy that, like JFK's assassination, engendered collective trauma.

The line "Play 'Misty' for me" contains a double-allusion: to Erroll Garner's 1954 jazz standard "Misty" as well as the 1971 film Play Misty for Me, a thriller about a disc jockey being stalked by a fan, which was directed by Clint Eastwood (whose 1980 film Bronco Billy Dylan had quoted in his 1985 song "Seeing the Real You at Last").

The line "Play 'Moonlight sonata' in F-sharp" misidentifies the key in which the sonata was written, which was actually C sharp minor. This was likely, however, a deliberate "error" on the part of Dylan, who may have known that Beethoven felt his Piano Sonata No. 24, a "highly lyrical and moderately difficult sonata in the unusual key of F-sharp major" was "better" than the more popular Moonlight sonata.

In the song's penultimate line, Dylan sings "Play 'Love Me or Leave Me' by the great Bud Powell". In addition to being the last artist named in the song, jazz pianist and composer Powell is also the only one, among the dozens listed, whose name is preceded by an adjective. Furthermore, the reference is notable because Powell never actually recorded "Love Me or Leave Me". He did, however, compose a contrafact titled "Get It" that is based on the same chord structure as "Love Me or Leave Me". Dylan scholar Laura Tenschert believes that this may have been Dylan's clever, indirect way of acknowledging his own predilection for musical appropriation in songwriting.

NPR's Bob Boilen and Ann Powers attempted to identify all of the individual songs referenced in "Murder Most Foul". They made the resulting 74-song playlist available to stream via Spotify and Apple Music.

== Charts ==
This song was the first Bob Dylan track to top any Billboard chart.

Chart performance for "Murder Most Foul"
Chart (2020)	Peak position
Scottish Singles Sales (Official Charts)	7
UK Singles Downloads (Official Charts)	6
US Digital Song Sales (Billboard)	8
US Hot Rock & Alternative Songs (Billboard)	5

== Accolades ==
Accolades for "Murder Most Foul"
Publication	Accolade	Rank
Variety	40 Best Songs of 2020	2
Rolling Stone	The 25 Best Bob Dylan Songs of the 21st Century	5
Paste	50 Best Songs of 2020	6
Pitchfork	100 Best Songs of 2020	6
Star Tribune	10 Best Songs of 2020	6
The Fader	100 Best Songs of 2020	7
NPR	100 Best Songs of 2020	7
The New Yorker	10 Best Songs of 2020	7
Pitchfork	The 100 Best Songs of the 2020s So Far	8
Our Culture Mag	25 Best Songs of 2020	10
The Times	The 10 Best Bob Dylan Songs	10
The Guardian	20 Best Songs of 2020	13
American Songwriter	20 Best Songs of 2020	N/A
Spectrum Culture	Bob Dylan's 20 Best Songs of the '10s and Beyond	N/A
Ultimate Classic Rock	20 Best Songs of 2020	N/A
Gold Radio	Bob Dylan's 30 Greatest Songs Ever	30
udiscovermusic	30 Best Bob Dylan Songs	N/A
The Guardian	Bob Dylan's 50 Greatest Songs	33
The Big Issue	The 80 Best Bob Dylan Songs That Aren't Greatest Hits	51
The Guardian	80 Bob Dylan Songs Everyone Should Know	N/A
Billboard	100 Best Songs of 2020	76
Inside Hook	100 Best Songs of 2020	N/A

== Cover versions ==
The song was covered by the Milk Carton Kids' Kenneth Pattengale who released his version on YouTube on April 4, 2020.

Blues singer Rory Block covered it on her 2024 album Positively 4th Street.

== See also ==
- Assassination of John F. Kennedy in popular culture
