= Rough and Rowdy Ways =

2020 studio album by Bob Dylan

Studio album by Bob Dylan
- Released: June 19, 2020
- Recorded: January–March 2020
- Studio: Sound City (Los Angeles)
- Genres: Americana; folk; blues; rhythm and blues
- Length: 70:33
- Label: Columbia

Bob Dylan chronology
The Bootleg Series Vol. 15: Travelin' Thru, 1967–1969 (2019)	Rough and Rowdy Ways (2020)	1970 (2021)

Bob Dylan studio album chronology
Triplicate (2017)	Rough and Rowdy Ways (2020)	Shadow Kingdom (2023)

Singles from Rough and Rowdy Ways
- 1. "Murder Most Foul" Released: March 27, 2020; 2. "I Contain Multitudes" Released: April 17, 2020; 3. "False Prophet" Released: May 8, 2020

Rough and Rowdy Ways is the thirty-ninth studio album by American singer-songwriter Bob Dylan, released on June 19, 2020, through Columbia Records. It is Dylan's first album of original songs since his 2012 album Tempest, following three releases that covered traditional pop standards. The album was recorded at Sound City Studios from January to early March 2020. The session musicians included all of the then-current members of Dylan's Never Ending Tour band alongside other musicians, such as Blake Mills and Fiona Apple. The album's sound was described by critics as Americana, folk, blues, and rhythm and blues.

Rough and Rowdy Ways was preceded by the singles "Murder Most Foul", "I Contain Multitudes" and "False Prophet"; "Murder Most Foul" became Dylan's first song to top any US Billboard chart. The album was universally praised by critics, described as being one of Dylan's best works and placing highly in many year-end album lists, including the top spot on four lists. It peaked at No. 1 in more than ten countries and No. 2 in the United States and Australia.

== Background ==
The recording of Rough and Rowdy Ways closely followed the end of the fall 2019 leg of Dylan's Never Ending Tour, during which he had introduced two new band members: drummer Matt Chamberlain (who replaced the outgoing George Receli) and guitarist Bob Britt (who had previously played on Dylan's Grammy Award-winning 1997 album Time Out of Mind). Several critics described the shows on this tour as Dylan's best in years. Tony Garnier, Dylan's bass player since 1989, concurred. When asked in an interview in 2021 if there was anything he wanted to share about his 30+ years of playing with Dylan, Garnier responded, "The last gigs we did before the pandemic hit were, I think, the best shows ever ... It's the most incredible band that he has now ... By the time we got to the Beacon Theatre in New York City, it was just incredible. It was so good. And I talked to people who had seen Bob for years and people who've worked with him and fans who've seen him, and they'd tell me after that last tour ... that ended before we recorded this record, people thought it absolutely was the best shows that they'd seen, and I agree ... just the best, really the best, Bob gigs that I've been involved with".

== Writing ==
It is not known when Dylan wrote the songs for Rough and Rowdy Ways although it is possible, as with his previous album of original material, Tempest, that he may have been working on them with his band during soundchecks on the last tour before they went into the studio to record. Musically, it is one of Dylan's most diverse albums. It mixes acoustic folk songs ("I Contain Multitudes", "Black Rider", "Mother of Muses", "Key West (Philosopher Pirate)") with electric blues stomps ("False Prophet", "Goodbye Jimmy Reed", "Crossing the Rubicon"), a torch ballad ("I've Made Up My Mind to Give Myself to You"), and a couple of unconventional songs that are more difficult to classify ("My Own Version of You", "Murder Most Foul"). Some of the music was apparently written in the studio: as drummer Matt Chamberlain explained in an interview, "[Dylan] might have like a reference point for a groove or a feel and then we'll just kind of jam on that. And then he'll start trying to sing over it, and then he'll get on the piano and add some extra chords and we'll kind of work out the arrangement, and the next thing you know we've tracked the song".

Rough and Rowdy Ways has been referred to by critics as one of Dylan's wordiest and most lyrically dense albums (in addition to being his longest song temporally, "Murder Most Foul" has the highest word count of any Dylan song) as well as being one of the most cohesive. The "referentiality" of the songs (most obvious in "Murder Most Foul", which features a litany of song titles, but also evident in "I Contain Multitudes", "My Own Version of You" and others) has been much commented upon. The songs on the album also feature many overlapping themes, such as the process of creating art, the role of the artist in society and the purpose of art through the ages (from classical antiquity to the present day), the assassination of political figures, and religion, death and the afterlife. When asked in an interview about the striking lyric, "I sleep with life and death in the same bed", in the song "I Contain Multitudes", Dylan denied that the line was written in reference to his own mortality: "I think about the death of the human race. The long strange trip of the naked ape. Not to be light on it, but everybody's life is so transient. Every human being, no matter how strong or mighty, is frail when it comes to death. I think about it in general terms, not in a personal way".

== Recording ==
The 10 songs on Rough and Rowdy Ways were recorded in January and February 2020 at Sound City Studios in Los Angeles. The sessions for the album were engineered and mixed by Chris Shaw who had previously engineered and mixed Dylan's albums Modern Times in 2006 and Love and Theft in 2001.

The core band for these sessions consisted of the latest iteration of the Never Ending Tour band, which had just played together across the United States for the first time for a total of 39 shows. In addition to Matt Chamberlain, Bob Britt and Tony Garnier, mentioned above, the group included Never Ending Tour band mainstays Charlie Sexton on guitar and multi-instrumentalist Donnie Herron. The sessions also featured contributions from "additional musicians" Blake Mills, Fiona Apple, Benmont Tench, Alan Pasqua and Tommy Rhodes. Fiona Apple and Alan Pasqua both played piano on the nearly 17-minute "Murder Most Foul", the only track on which either musician appears, and recorded their parts in a single day. "I told Bob I was really insecure about it", Apple relayed in an interview with Pitchfork, "and he was really encouraging and nice. He was just like, 'You're not here to be perfect, you're here to be you'".

When asked in an interview how much "latitude" he had on what he played, guitarist Bob Britt responded, "You just play what fits the song. It is all guided by Bob, it may happen quickly or it may take a while to get it to where he likes it. It is really a beautiful process to watch how he crafts a song". Drummer Matt Chamberlain has similarly described the recording process as spontaneous: "[Dylan]'s so last-minute, in-the-moment about the way he makes his records. It's almost like playing with a poet jazz musician because he's just always changing it up; anything can happen at any time, things can just get trashed and we'll do a whole new version of a song. He's amazing".

Blake Mills, who serves as a "sort of in-house producer" at Sound City, is believed by many to have made a substantial impact on the overall sound of Rough and Rowdy Ways. Mills wrote on Instagram on the day of the album's release that working with Dylan was "the one thing I have always dreamt of doing, and it turned out to be better than the dream", and posted videos of himself playing instrumental versions of seven of the Rough and Rowdy Ways songs solo on guitar. Dylanologist Trev Gibb concluded that "the album would have in no way been as musically elegant without his parts, if indeed these are the parts he played".

In a Reddit "AMA" session in 2021, Mills expounded on Dylan's process during the recording of the album: "One thing that was incredibly inspiring for me about those sessions was witnessing how incredibly dedicated [Dylan] is to the story in the song. Everything we did was in the interest of that, and he's kind of the only arbiter of when he's doing it and when it's not quite there yet. It's not always an immediately knowable thing, sometimes you gotta sleep on something you're happy with for a day or two before you realize it's not where it ultimately needs to be. There were a lot of lessons in 'letting go' for me, working on that album". When asked about Dylan's approach versus more "modern" approaches, Mills added, "As for 'modern' vs 'classic' approaches to record making, all I can say is there were some BOLD things we did and got away with on those sessions that nobody hears. I don't mean effects or auto-tune or anything like that. We were all inspired by 'old' sounds and 'old' methods, but HOW we got those sounds and the methods we used were not by any means 'classic' or 'correct'".

Dylan had contacted his former collaborator Robbie Robertson of the Band in late 2019 about possibly playing on the album, even reading him new song lyrics over the phone. Robertson regretted having to turn the opportunity down, noting that he was "slammed" with work on various other projects at the time and that Dylan "felt like it was cooked and he needed to bring it out of the oven. So he went in and recorded this album".

In the 2022 edition of their book Bob Dylan All the Songs: The Story Behind Every Track, authors Philippe Margotin and Jean-Michel Guesdon describe Dylan as having "confided" in an unnamed source that the recording of Rough and Rowdy Ways "was his favorite studio experience".

== Release and promotion ==
The first indication in the press that Dylan had been working on an album of new material came via an interview with actress Gina Gershon, a longtime friend of Dylan's, on an episode of the Life is Short with Justin Long podcast that premiered on March 3, 2020. Gershon told Long, "I guess [this] was like two months ago. ... [Dylan] was at his studio in L.A. ... He read me some lyrics he was writing and he was all excited. He was like, 'Do you want to hear this?' ... I was thinking, 'Oh my God, this is so cool'. You could see why he still loves doing what he does. He was excited".

On March 27, 2020, the single "Murder Most Foul" was released unannounced, Dylan's first original song distributed since 2012. On April 17, 2020, "I Contain Multitudes", a second single, was released. Rough and Rowdy Ways was officially announced on May 8, 2020. The album's third and final single, "False Prophet", was released on the same day. On June 11, 2020, Bob Dylan's YouTube channel revealed the full track list for the first time, only eight days before the album's release. Rough and Rowdy Ways was released as a double album on June 19, 2020, with the entirety of the second CD and the entirety of the last side of the vinyl edition dedicated to "Murder Most Foul".

Dylan only consented to one interview, with historian Douglas Brinkley, to promote the album. In a transcript of their wide-ranging conversation, which appeared in The New York Times on June 12, 2020, Dylan discussed the composition of the Rough and Rowdy Ways songs (which he claims were written in a "trance state") and offered his thoughts on everything from the COVID-19 pandemic ("Maybe we are on the eve of destruction. There are numerous ways you can think about this virus. I think you just have to let it run its course".) and the murder of George Floyd ("It was beyond ugly. Let's hope that justice comes swift for the Floyd family and for the nation".) to his favorite songs by the Rolling Stones and the Eagles.

Dylan announced on September 27, 2021, via his official website, a new tour called the Rough and Rowdy Ways World Wide Tour, spanning 2021–2024, with dates beginning in November. The first leg of the tour consisted of 21 dates in the midwestern and eastern United States, the first live shows Dylan had played since the album's release. Dylan played eight of the 10 songs from Rough and Rowdy Ways at every show on this leg of the tour, which was acclaimed by critics, some of whom noted that it was rare for a "legacy artist" to focus so extensively on recent material in live performance. The tour's itinerary was extended several times before finally concluding on May 1, 2026 in Abilene, Texas.

== Packaging ==
The album cover features a color-tinted version of a black-and-white photograph taken by British photojournalist Ian Berry in 1964. On assignment from the Observer, Berry was tasked with capturing images of "black culture in England" when he snapped a picture of a well-dressed couple dancing while a man leans on a jukebox behind them. The location is a "long-defunct underground club on Cable Street in the East London town of Whitechapel". Describing the album cover in Rolling Stone, music journalist Andy Greene wrote that "the image crackles with intrigue and romance". The only text to appear on the cover is the album's title, which is widely believed to be a reference to the 1929 Jimmie Rodgers song "My Rough and Rowdy Ways".

Rough and Rowdy Ways inside CD card sleeve

The inside covers of the vinyl album and the CD both feature a cropped, colorized version of a famous photograph of Rodgers and the Carter Family that was originally taken in Louisville, Kentucky, on June 10, 1931. The back covers of both the vinyl album and CD releases feature a cropped and partially sepia-tinted black-and-white photograph of John F. Kennedy, a portrait taken by Louis Fabian Bachrach Jr., that was originally used to promote the single of "Murder Most Foul" upon its release in March 2020. The vinyl album sleeves contain additional images of the artwork used for the "I Contain Multitudes" and "False Prophet" singles that are not included in the CD artwork. The album design is credited to Josh Cheuse.

The same image had been used earlier on the 2005 compilation "Northern Soul" released in the UK..

== Critical reception and legacy ==
Professional ratings
Aggregate scores
Source	Rating
AnyDecentMusic?	8.9/10
Metacritic	95/100
Review scores
Source	Rating
AllMusic	4/5 stars
And It Don't Stop	A−
Clash	9/10
The Guardian	5/5 stars
The Independent	4/5 stars
Mojo	5/5 stars
NME	5/5 stars
Pitchfork	9.0/10
Rolling Stone	4.5/5 stars
Uncut	4.5/5 stars

Rough and Rowdy Ways was met with widespread critical acclaim, and earned Dylan his highest ratings since Love and Theft (2001). At Metacritic, which assigns a normalized rating out of 100 to reviews from professional critics, the album received an average score of 95 based on 25 reviews, making it the second highest-rated album of 2020 (behind only Fiona Apple's Fetch the Bolt Cutters). With 31 reviews, aggregator Album of the Year considers critical consensus as an 89 out of 100 and AnyDecentMusic? sums up 24 critics with an 8.93 out of 10.

Reviewing for The Daily Telegraph in June 2020, Neil McCormick hailed the album as "one long, magnificent ride for his most loyal fans" and declared, "The wise old poet has stirred up a cryptic cauldron of truths and clues, philosophy, myths and magic". Anne Margaret Daniel, writing in Hot Press, said "Rough and Rowdy Ways is a record we need right now, and it will endure". "Academics who can’t dance will fill unread books dissecting the library of historical reference, and the cast of characters engrained in these grooves", wrote Pat Carty in his review of the album for the same magazine, "The rest of us can just be thankful that the greatest song and dance man of them all is still rolling". Mikael Wood, in the Los Angeles Times, said the album "rolls out one marvel after another". Writing for Slate, Carl Wilson called the release Dylan's best in "many years, maybe decades" for the breadth of its cultural references and the depth of Dylan's lyrics and songwriting. Jon Pareles, chief music critic for The New York Times, labeled the album a "Critic's Pick", describing its songs as "equal parts death-haunted and cantankerous", rivaling "the grim, gallows-humored conviction of his albums Time Out of Mind (1997) and Love and Theft (2001)".

Sam Sodomsky, in a 9.0/10 review at Pitchfork, wrote that the vaudevillian spirit that ran through Love and Theft and Modern Times (2006) is mostly limited to the Frankenstein-themed "My Own Version of You" and that Dylan's "biting, absurdist humor is not the focus. There are no distractions; he speaks carefully, quietly, earnestly. It results in a gorgeous and meticulous record. The lyrics are striking—dense enough to inspire a curriculum, clever enough to quote like proverbs". Exclaim!'s Kerry Doole gave the album a perfect rating of 10, praising its allusions to "old blues songs, Shakespeare, classical mythology ('Crossing the Rubicon'), the Bible and pop culture", drawing literary parallels between Dylan's work and that of authors Don DeLillo and James Ellroy, and asking "why intellectual references are so rare in contemporary music". Writing for The Telegraph India, Jaimin Rajani said this release brings respite and diversity. Ken Tucker of NPR's Fresh Air gave the release a positive review for its musical diversity.

In his "Consumer Guide" column, Robert Christgau said that the album's impact is "muffled" by some "indistinct" songs, namely "Black Rider" and "I've Made Up My Mind to Give Myself to You", but declared, "The decisive musical achievement on Dylan's first album of originals since 2012 is establishing the aged voice that flubbed his Sinatra albums as the sonic signature of an elegiac retrospective".

Although not released as a single, the penultimate track, the nine-and-a-half-minute "Key West (Philosopher Pirate)", inspired substantial critical commentary. Rolling Stone ranked it the second best song of 2020 and placed it seventh on a list of "The 25 Best Bob Dylan Songs of the 21st Century". In an article accompanying the latter list, music journalist Rob Sheffield extrapolated from the impressionistic lyrics a narrative about "a grizzled outlaw, hiding out in Florida, hounded by his memories". Authors Adam Selzer and Michael Glover Smith have drawn thematic parallels between "Key West" and Harold Arlen and Yip Harburg's "Over the Rainbow" and Dylan's own "Murder Most Foul", respectively. Historian Douglas Brinkley, who conducted the only interview with Dylan to coincide with the album's release, described the song as "a beautiful piece of art," adding that "Dylan knows it's my favorite on the CD".

A 2021 WhatCulture article ranking all of Dylan's albums placed Rough and Rowdy Ways ninth (out of 39 total) and summarized it thusly: "A lyrically dense, brooding and beautifully balanced record, Rough And Rowdy Ways is yet another spotless masterclass in storytelling, best listened to in one sitting to make the most of its purposefully repetitive, circular composition ... Despite pushing 80, Rough And Rowdy Ways finds Dylan still producing some of the best music on offer. It's really quite spectacular". Ian O'Riordan, in a 2021 Irish Times article, also placed Rough and Rowdy Ways ninth in the Dylan pantheon and cited "Key West (Philosopher Pirate)" as his favourite track.

In the 2022 edition of their book Bob Dylan All the Songs: The Story Behind Every Track, authors Philippe Margotin and Jean-Michel Guesdon call the album a "poetic balm" for a world in "profound turmoil", claiming it should be "placed somewhere between Highway 61 Revisited, Blonde on Blonde and Blood on the Tracks – in other words, on the same level as his masterworks". In 2024, music critic Steven Hyden named it one of his personal five best albums of the 2020s "so far" at Uproxx.

In addition to being widely acclaimed by critics, Rough and Rowdy Ways and its individual tracks have also been highly praised by many of Dylan's fellow artists including Paul McCartney, Neil Young, Keith Richards, Joan Baez, Robert Plant, Chrissie Hynde, Nick Cave, Phoebe Bridgers, David Byrne, Bruce Springsteen, Joan Osborne, Sharon Van Etten, Iggy Pop, Ann Wilson, Jarvis Cocker, Alison Mosshart, Wilco, Eleanor Friedberger, Elvis Costello, Margo Price, and Todd Haynes, director of the Dylan biopic I'm Not There.

== Commercial performance ==
Rough and Rowdy Ways was the best-selling album in the United States the week it debuted (although it charted at No. 2 behind Lil Baby's My Turn due to streaming and individual track sales), with 54,700 equivalent album units. This made it Dylan's highest-charting album on the Billboard 200 in more than a decade. It also marked his seventh consecutive decade of charting top 40 albums, making him the first artist to accomplish this feat.

The album additionally debuted at No. 1 on Billboard's Top Rock Albums and Americana/Folk albums charts. On the latter list, Dylan extended his record as the all-time leader with eight No. 1 albums, dating to the chart's 2009 inception. Dylan also topped Billboard's Artist 100 chart on July 4, 2020, to become the "top musical act in the U.S." for the first time in his career (dating to the chart's launch in 2014). At 79-years-old, he is the "most-senior act" to ever top this chart.

== Accolades ==
Accolades for Rough and Rowdy Ways
Publication	Accolade	Rank
Lincoln Journal Star	25 Best Albums of 2020	1
Mojo	75 Best Albums of 2020	1
Ultimate Classic Rock	25 Best Albums of 2020	1
Uncut	75 Best Albums of 2020	1
411Mania	100 Best Albums of 2020	2
AnyDecentMusic?	10 Best Albums of 2020	2
Dallas Observer	10 Best Albums of 2020	2
Insider	10 Best Albums of 2020	2
Metacritic	40 Best Albums of 2020	2
San Diego Union-Tribune	10 Best Albums of 2020	2
The Spokesman-Review	10 Best Albums of 2020	2
Star Tribune	10 Best Albums of 2020	2
Union-Bulletin	20 Best Albums of 2020	2
Uproxx	20 Best Albums of 2020	2
Gothamist	40 Best Albums of 2020	3
Variety	10 Best Albums of 2020	3
Vulture	10 Best Albums of the Year	3
Entertainment Weekly	15 Best Albums of 2020	4
Louder Than War	50 Best Albums of 2020	4
Rolling Stone	50 Best Albums of 2020	4
The Wire	50 Releases of 2020 (Rewind)	4
Album of the Year	6 Highest Rated Albums of 2020	5
The Los Angeles Times	10 Best Albums of 2020	5
The New York Times	10 Best Albums of 2020	5
The Philadelphia Inquirer	10 Best Albums of 2020	5
Us Weekly	10 Best Albums of 2020	5
The Line of Best Fit	50 Best Albums of 2020	6
No Depression	20 Best Albums of 2020	6
Pitchfork	50 Best Albums of 2020	6
Pitchfork	35 Best Rock Albums of 2020	—
Les Inrockuptibles	100 Best Albums of 2020	7
The New Yorker	10 Best Albums of 2020	7
Far Out Magazine	50 Best Albums of 2020	8
Hot Press	10 Best Albums of 2020	8
Exclaim!	50 Best Albums of 2020	9
OOR	10 Best Albums of 2020	9
The Plain Dealer	50 Best Albums of 2020	9
Radio New Zealand	20 Best Albums of 2020	9
The Sydney Morning Herald	10 Best Albums of 2020	9
The Irish Times	Bob Dylan's 39 Albums Ranked	9
WhatCulture	Every Bob Dylan Album Ranked	9
BBC	10 Best Albums of 2020	—
Financial Times	10 Best Albums of 2020	—
Wall Street Journal	10 Best Albums of 2020	—
The Guardian	50 Best Albums of 2020	13
Discogs	25 Best Albums of 2020	16
PopMatters	60 Best Albums of 2020	16
The Independent	Bob Dylan's 20 Greatest Albums	17
Stereogum	50 Best Albums of 2020	22
Paste	50 Best Albums of 2020	23
AllMusic	23 Best Blues Albums of 2020	—
BrooklynVegan	55 Best Albums of 2020	27
The Independent	50 Best Albums of 2020	30
Slant	50 Best Albums of 2020	30
Under the Radar	Top 100 Albums of 2020	37
NME	50 Best Albums of 2020	49
HMV	50 Best Albums of 2020	—
AllMusic	100 Best Albums of 2020	—
Rough Trade	100 Best Albums of 2020	—

== Track listing ==
All tracks are written by Bob Dylan.

Disc one
No.	Title	Length
1.	"I Contain Multitudes"	4:36
2.	"False Prophet"	6:00
3.	"My Own Version of You"	6:41
4.	"I've Made Up My Mind to Give Myself to You"	6:32
5.	"Black Rider"	4:12
6.	"Goodbye Jimmy Reed"	4:13
7.	"Mother of Muses"	4:29
8.	"Crossing the Rubicon"	7:22
9.	"Key West (Philosopher Pirate)"	9:34

Disc two
No.	Title	Length
1.	"Murder Most Foul"	16:54
Total length:		70:33

== Personnel ==
Musicians

- Bob Dylan – vocals, guitar, harmonica (uncredited)
- Charlie Sexton – guitar
- Bob Britt – guitar
- Donnie Herron – steel guitar, violin, accordion, mandolin
- Tony Garnier – bass guitar, acoustic bass
- Matt Chamberlain – drums

Additional musicians

- Blake Mills – guitar, harmonium on "Murder Most Foul"
- Benmont Tench – Hammond organ on "Key West (Philosopher Pirate)" and "Murder Most Foul"
- Alan Pasqua – piano on "Murder Most Foul"
- Fiona Apple – piano on "Murder Most Foul"
- Tommy Rhodes

Engineers

- Chris Shaw – engineering, mixing
- Joseph Lorge – assistant engineering
- Greg Calbi – mastering

Artwork

- Ian Berry – front cover photo
- Josh Cheuse – album design
- Andrea Orlandi – inner sleeve photo on vinyl edition (also used in video for "I Contain Multitudes")

== Charts ==
=== Weekly charts ===
Weekly chart performance for Rough and Rowdy Ways
Chart (2020)	Peak position
Australian Albums (ARIA)	2
Austrian Albums (Ö3 Austria)	1
Belgian Albums (Ultratop Flanders)	2
Belgian Albums (Ultratop Wallonia)	5
Canadian Albums (Billboard)	14
Croatian International Albums (HDU)	1
Czech Albums (ČNS IFPI)	7
Danish Albums (Hitlisten)	3
Dutch Albums (Album Top 100)	1
Finnish Albums (Suomen virallinen lista)	14
French Albums (SNEP)	4
German Albums (Offizielle Top 100)	1
Hungarian Albums (MAHASZ)	14
Irish Albums (Official Charts)	1
Italian Albums (FIMI)	4
New Zealand Albums (RMNZ)	1
Norwegian Albums (VG-lista)	1
Polish Albums (ZPAV)	23
Portuguese Albums (AFP)	1
Scottish Albums (Official Charts)	1
Spanish Albums (PROMUSICAE)	5
Swedish Albums (Sverigetopplistan)	3
Swiss Albums (Schweizer Hitparade)	1
UK Albums (Official Charts)	1
US Billboard 200	2
US Top Rock Albums (Billboard)	1

=== Year-end charts ===
Year-end chart performance for Rough and Rowdy Ways
Chart (2020)	Position
Australian Albums (ARIA)	96
Austrian Albums (Ö3 Austria)	36
Belgian Albums (Ultratop Flanders)	43
Belgian Albums (Ultratop Wallonia)	190
Dutch Albums (Album Top 100)	65
German Albums (Offizielle Top 100)	47
Swedish Albums (Sverigetopplistan)	95
Swiss Albums (Schweizer Hitparade)	9
UK Albums (OCC)	56
US Top Rock Albums (Billboard)	56

== Certifications and sales ==
Certifications and sales for Rough and Rowdy Ways
Region	Certification	Certified units/sales
United Kingdom (BPI)	Gold	100,000^{‡}
^{‡} Sales+streaming figures based on certification alone.
