= Richard F. Thomas =

Harvard Latinist

Richard F. Thomas (born September 26, 1950) is the George Martin Lane Professor of the Classics at Harvard University. His scholarship has focused on various critical approaches, metrics and prose stylistics (particularly Tacitus), genre studies, translation theory and practice, and the reception of Classical literature and culture, particularly with respect to Virgil.

== Early life and education ==
Thomas was born in London, England, and brought up in New Zealand. He received his B.A. and M.A. from the University of Auckland, in 1972 and 1973 respectively, and his Ph.D. from the University of Michigan in 1977.

== Career ==
He has taught at Harvard as Assistant and Associate Professor, 1977–84; as associate professor at the University of Cincinnati, 1984–86; as professor at Cornell University, 1986–87; as professor of Greek and Latin at Harvard from 1987–2010; as George Martin Lane Professor of the Classics since 2010. He was also visiting professor of Latin, University of Venice (Spring, 1991).

In the Harvard Department of Classics, he has served as the director of undergraduate studies, director of graduate studies, and department chair. He is co-chair of the seminar on "The Civilizations of Ancient Greece and Rome," in Harvard's Mahindra Humanities Center. He has served as director of the American Philological Association and as trustee and director, and as president, of the Vergilian Society of America. Since 2001, he has been a trustee of the Loeb Classical Library, and is currently serving as editor of Harvard Studies in Classical Philology.

In 2017 Thomas published Why Bob Dylan Matters, a study of Bob Dylan's work in the context of Virgil and Ovid.
