= Riverside Theater (Milwaukee) =

Concert hall in Milwaukee, Wisconsin, US

Coordinates: 43°02′20.6″N 87°54′39.4″W

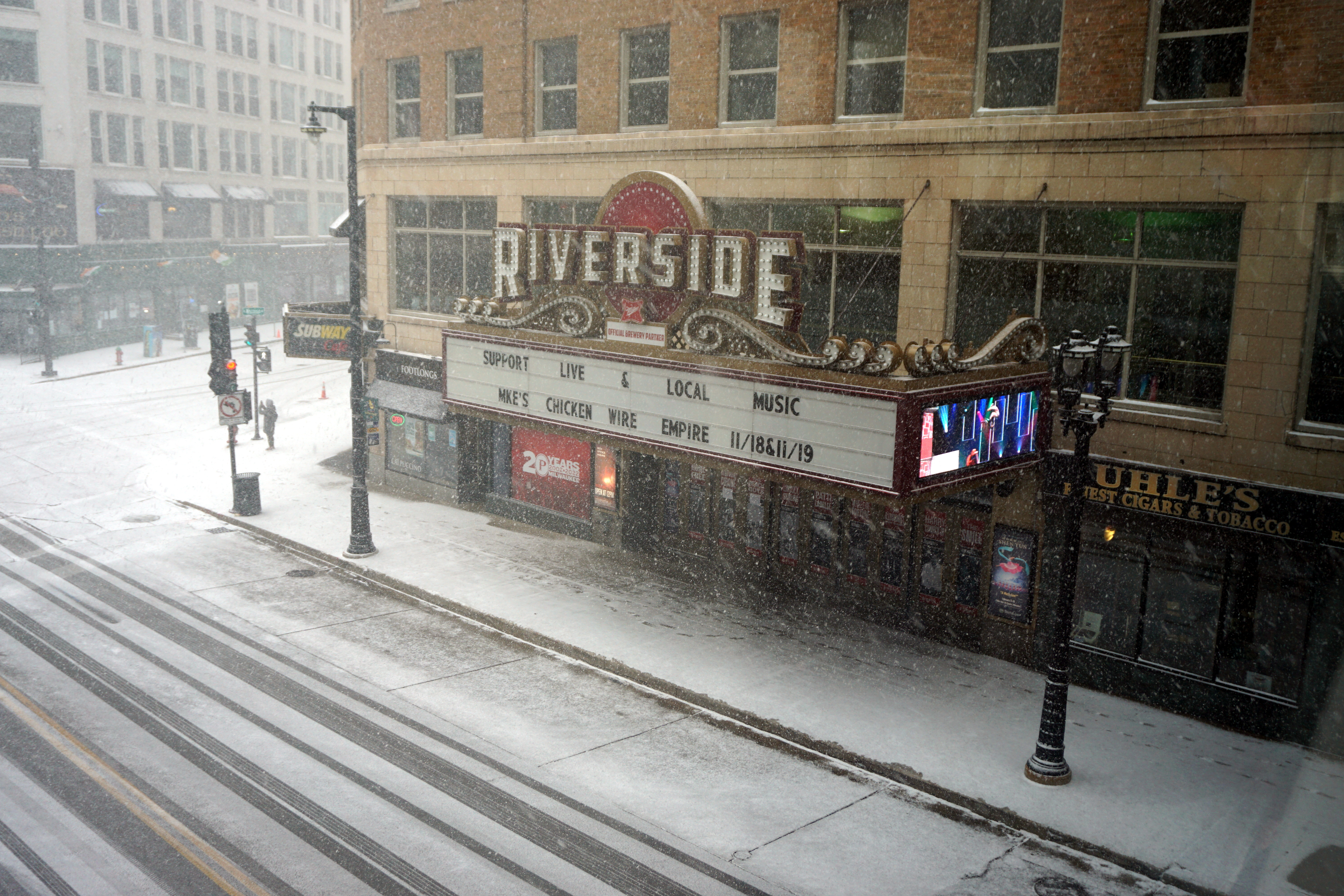
- View of the Riverside Theater from the Milwaukee Skywalk
- Interactive map of Riverside Theater
- Address: 116 W. Wisconsin Ave. Milwaukee, Wisconsin; United States
- Owner: Pabst Theater Group
- Capacity: 2,480
- Type: concert hall
- Public transit: MCTS

Construction
- Opened: April 29, 1928
- Architects: Charles Kirchoff; Thomas Rose

Website
- www.pabsttheatergroup.com/venues/detail/the-riverside-theater/

The Riverside Theater is a concert hall located in Milwaukee, Wisconsin. The venue seats 2,480 people and hosts live performances such as musicians, comedians, and shows. It is leased by the Pabst Theater Group.

== History ==
The Riverside Theater was designed in the French Baroque style by local architects Charles Kirchhoff and Thomas Rose, who had designed multiple theaters, including the Palace Theater in New York City. The venue was commissioned by RKO Pictures as part of a 12 story office building called the Empire Building. Opening on April 29, 1928, the theater primarily played vaudeville performances, big bands, and movies. By the 1950s however, the theater had transitioned to almost exclusively showing first-run movies. The building was sold in 1962 to Towne Realty (now Zilber Ltd.), who leased the theater to United Artists. In 1966, the highly decorated ceiling and curtains were destroyed in a fire caused by a patron throwing a cigarette onto the stage.

By the 1970s, the Riverside Theater was in a general state of disrepair, and had switched to showing B-movies, partially due to the growing number of multiplex cinemas. In 1982, United Artists decided to not renew their lease of the theater, leaving it closed. Joseph Zilber, the owner of Towne Realty, agreed to fund a $1.5 million renovation to restore the Riverside Theater, in addition to funding the restoration of its original theater organ made by Wurlitzer. On November 2, 1984, The Riverside Theater reopened as a live performance venue.

In 2005, the theater was leased to the Pabst Theater Foundation (now Pabst Theater Group) and underwent artistic renovations. Between 2015 and 2016, more renovations were done including replacing the carpeting, stage floor, and seating. A new marquee and a 40 feet (12 m) vertical sign were also added to the exterior, reminiscent of the theater's history.
