= Tinchy Stryder videography =

Tinchy Stryder video discography
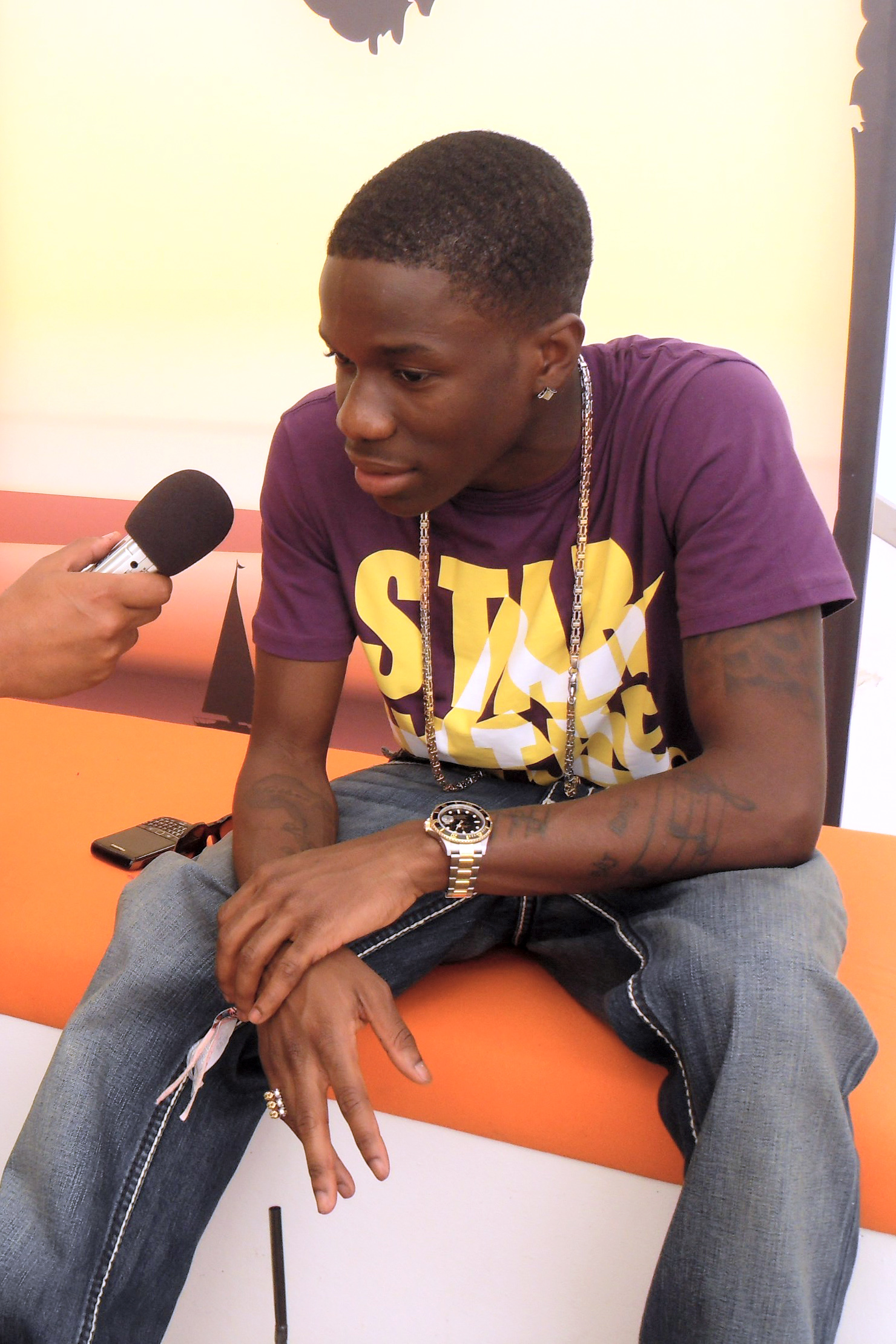
- Tinchy Stryder in 2010
- Music videos: 25
- Featured music videos: 15
- Cameo appearances: 3
- Filmography: 2

This is the videography of Tinchy Stryder (Kwasi Danquah III), and it consists of twenty-five music videos as a lead artist, fifteen music videos as a featured artist, and three music video cameo appearances, one film and one television appearances. In total he has been in a total of forty-three music videos, one movie and television program to date.

He took a lead role on the music video for "Spinnin' for 2012" (2011) which was the official olympic torch song for the 2012 Olympic Games, and the music video was directed by American filmmaker Dale Resteghini. He later released the music video for "Bright Lights" (2012) from his fourth studio album Full Tank, which was also directed by Dale Resteghini. "Gangsta?" (2010) and "Game Over" (2010) from his third studio album Third Strike were directed by Adam Powell. Emil Nava directed "Never Leave You" (2009), "Second Chance" (2010) and "In My System" (2010) from his second studio album Catch 22 and third studio album Third Strike. The music video "Let It Rain" (2011) —a collaboration with Melanie Fiona—which was set in Los Angeles from his third studio album Third Strike and "Off The Record" (2011) —a collaboration with Calvin Harris—which was set in Las Vegas from his fourth studio album Full Tank were directed by Luke Monaghan and James Barber.

His music videos from his second studio album Catch 22, "Stryderman" (2008) directed by Emil Nava, "Number 1" (2009) directed by Emil Nava and "Spaceship" (2011) —which was set in Portofino, Liguria, Italy and directed by Luke Monaghan and James Barber have received award nominations, in which "Spaceship" received a MOBO Award for Best Video. The recent video to be released is the music video from his fifth studio album End of Life on Earth for "Help Me" (2012) —which was set in scenes focused on Christian iconography in New Orleans was directed by Dan Henshaw.

He made an appearance on the television program The Only Way Is Essex on the episode The Only Way Is Essex (series 5) that was filmed in Spain, and released on 13 June 2012. He has also been cast in the movie by Keith Lemon, entitled Keith Lemon: The Film, which was released on 24 August 2012.

== Music videos ==
=== As lead artist ===
List of music videos as lead artist, showing year released, album name and director
| Year | Title | Album | Director(s) | Ref. |
|---|---|---|---|---|
| 2004 | "Underground" | Lost and Found | Brandon "Maniac" Jolie | |
| 2007 | "Breakaway" | Star in the Hood | DaVinChe | |
| 2007 | "Something About Your Smile" (with Cylena Cymone) | Star in the Hood | DaVinChe | |
| 2007 | "Mainstream Money" | Star in the Hood | Brandon "Maniac" Jolie | |
| 2008 | "Breathe" | Guns and Roses Volume. 2 | DaVinChe | |
| 2008 | "Stryderman"^{[A]} | Catch 22 | Kwasi Danquah III, Emil Nava | |
| 2008 | "Rollin" (with Roachee) | Tinchy Stryder vs. Maniac & Catch 22 | Jak "FrSH" O'Hare | |
| 2009 | "Tryna Be Me" (with Ruff Sqwad) | Catch 22 | Jak "FrSH" O'Hare | |
| 2009 | "Take Me Back" (with Taio Cruz) | Catch 22 | Emil Nava | |
| 2009 | "Number 1" (with N-Dubz)^{[B]} | Catch 22 | Emil Nava | |
| 2009 | "Never Leave You" (with Amelle Berrabah) | Catch 22 | Emil Nava | |
| 2009 | "You're Not Alone" | Catch 22 | Emil Nava, Kwasi Danquah III | |
| 2010 | "Gangsta?" | Third Strike | Adam Powell, Kwasi Danquah III | |
| 2010 | "In My System" | Third Strike | Emil Nava, Kwasi Danquah III | |
| 2010 | "Second Chance" (with Taio Cruz) | Third Strike | Emil Nava, Kwasi Danquah III | |
| 2010 | "Game Over" (with Example, Giggs, Professor Green, Devlin, Tinie Tempah & Chipmunk) | Third Strike | Adam Powell | |
| 2010 | "Famous" | Third Strike & III EP | Luke Monaghan | |
| 2010 | "Take The World" (with Bridget Kelly) | Third Strike | Adam Powell, Kwasi Danquah III | |
| 2011 | "Let It Rain" (with Melanie Fiona) | Third Strike | Kwasi Danquah III, Luke Monaghan & James Barber | |
| 2011 | "Spaceship" (with Dappy)^{[C]} | Full Tank | Kwasi Danquah III, Luke Monaghan & James Barber | |
| 2011 | "Spinnin' for 2012" (with Dionne Bromfield) | Good for the Soul | Dale "Rage" Resteghini | |
| 2011 | "Off The Record" (with Calvin Harris & Burns) | Full Tank | Luke Monaghan, James Barber | |
| 2011 | "Generation" | The Wish List | Luke Monaghan, James Barber | |
| 2012 | "Bright Lights" (with Pixie Lott) | Full Tank & Young Foolish Happy | Dale Resteghini | |
| 2012 | "Help Me" | End of Life on Earth | Kwasi Danquah III, Dan Henshaw | |

Notes:

- A The single "Stryderman" is Danquah's first single to chart on the UK Singles Chart, charting at #73. The music video won the award for Best Video at the 2008 UK-Urban Music Awards (UMA), as well as a nomination for Best Video at the 2008 MOBO Awards (Music of Black Origin).
- B The single "Number 1" is Danquah's first single to reach #1 on the UK Singles Chart. The music video led to Danquah being nominated for Best UK & Ireland New Act at the 2009 MTV Europe Music Awards (EMA), as well as nominations for Best Song at the 2009 MOBO Awards (Music of Black Origin), Best Video - In association with MTV Base at the 2010 MOBO Awards, and Brit Award for British Single at the 2010 Brit Awards.
- C The single "Spaceship" is Danquah's first top five single since 2009, charting at #5 on the UK Singles Chart. The music video won the award for Best Video at the 2011 MOBO Awards (Music of Black Origin), as well as nominations for Best Collaboration sponsored by Corona Extra and Best Single at the 2011 UK-Urban Music Awards (UMA).

=== Featured music videos ===
List of featured music videos, showing year released, album name and director
| Year | Title | Album | Director(s) | Ref. |
|---|---|---|---|---|
| 2004 | "Anna/Down" (with Ruff Sqwad) | Single only release | Brandon "Maniac" Jolie | |
| 2004 | "Fit But You Know It (MC Version)" (The Streets feat. Kano, Donae'o, Lady Sovereign, and Tinchy Stryder) | b-side only release | Adam Smith | |
| 2007 | "Xtra" (with Ruff Sqwad) | Star in the Hood | Brandon "Maniac" Jolie | |
| 2008 | "RSMD" (with Ruff Sqwad) | Single only release | Jak "FrSH" O'Hare | |
| 2008 | "Walking U Home" (with Ruff Sqwad) | Single only release | Jak "FrSH" O'Hare | |
| 2008 | "Where's Your Love" (Craig David with Tinchy Stryder & Rita Ora) | Greatest Hits | Steve Kemsley | |
| 2009 | "I Wanna Let U Know" (with Ruff Sqwad & Guests) | Single only release | Jak "FrSH" O'Hare | |
| 2009 | "I Got Soul" (as part of Young Soul Rebels) | Charity single | Chris Cowey | |
| 2009 | "Give It All U Got" (Lil Jon with Kee & Tinchy Stryder) | Single only release | David Rousseau | |
| 2010 | "On My Own" (Blame with Ruff Sqwad) | The Music | Danann Breathnach | |
| 2010 | "Champions" | III EP | Jak "FrSH" O'Hare | |
| 2011 | "Bring It" (Jodie Connor with Tinchy Stryder) | TBA | Luke Biggins, Yasha Malekzad | |
| 2011 | "This Side" (with Ruff Sqwad) | Single only release | Craig Capone | |
| 2011 | "Las Vegas" (with Ruff Sqwad) | Single only release | Luke Monaghan | |
| 2011 | "Teardrop" (as part of The Collective) | Charity single | Ben Vertex, Ben Leinster | |
| 2012 | "Mario Balotelli" (with Ruff Sqwad) | 2012 & The Wish List | Luke Monaghan, James Barber | |

=== Cameo appearances ===
List of cameo appearances in music videos, showing year released, album name and director
| Year | Title | Album | Director(s) | Ref. |
|---|---|---|---|---|
| 2003 | "Jus' a Rascal" (Dizzee Rascal) | Boy in da Corner | Ruben Fleischer | |
| 2004 | "Wot Do U Call It" (Wiley) | Treddin' on Thin Ice | Adam Smith | |
| 2009 | "Take That" (Wiley featuring Chew Fu) | Single only release | Ben Newman | |

== Filmography ==
Films
| Title | Director(s) | Role | Notes | Year | Ref |
|---|---|---|---|---|---|
| Keith Lemon: The Film | Paul Angunawela | Himself | Supporting role | 2012 | |

Television
| Title | Creator(s) | Role | Notes | Year | Ref |
|---|---|---|---|---|---|
| The Only Way Is Essex | —N/a | Himself | The Only Way Is Essex (series 5) filmed in Marbella, Spain. | 2012 | |

== See also ==
- List of songs
- Music discography

== References and notes ==
=== General ===
- "Tinchy Stryder - Videography". TinchyStryder.com.
