= Tinchy Stryder discography =

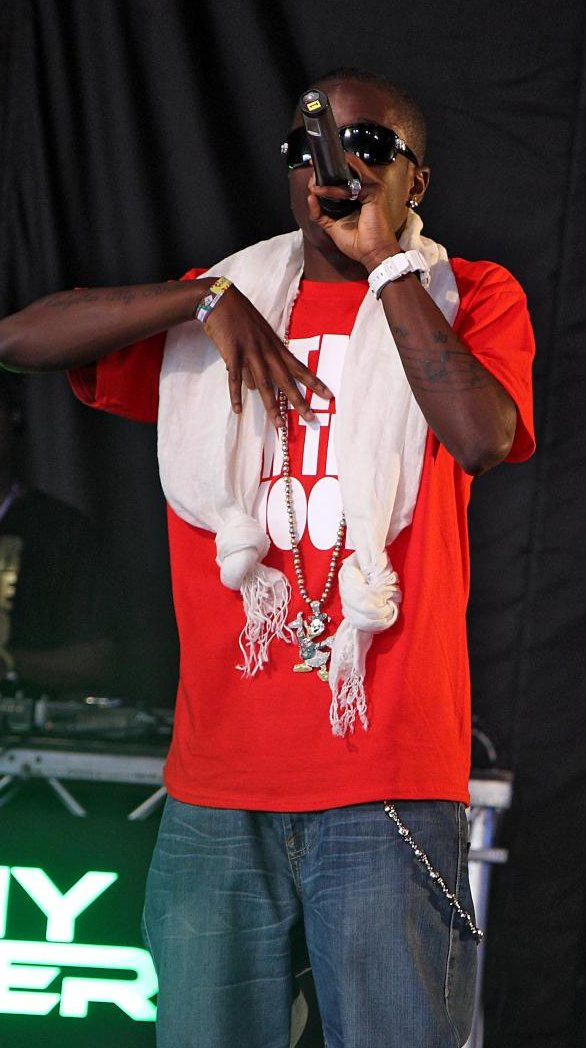
- Studio albums: 4
- Extended plays: 5
- Compilation albums: 1
- Singles: 17
- Mixtapes: 4
- Featured singles: 5
- Collaboration albums: 1
- Collaborations: 10

The discography of Tinchy Stryder, a recording artist whose real name is Kwasi Danquah, consists of four studio albums, one compilation album (with Roll Deep), one collaboration album, five extended plays, four mixtapes (including one with Roll Deep), 17 singles (including one promotional single, and one other charted single), five singles as a featured artist (including two charity singles), and ten collaborations. Danquah has sold over 22.2 million digital singles worldwide. Danquah performed under the stage name Stryder from 1997 to 2006, and has performed under the stage name Tinchy Stryder since 2006.

Danquah is a recording artist who throughout his music career mainly practiced the grime music genre from 2002 to 2007, and was a member of the grime group Roll Deep. In 2002, the grime group Roll Deep was formed, and included Danquah and Dizzee Rascal. They were making music that was a derivative of garage. For a while, there was not even a name for it. The label "grime" was the one that stuck.

In 2007, Danquah released his debut solo studio album, Star in the Hood, on the independent record label Takeover Entertainment—a partner of Live Nation—in August 2007. This album spawned two main singles, "Breakaway", which was released on 9 April 2007 and "Something About Your Smile", released on 6 August 2007. Bonus track "Mainstream Money" was also released as an underground single in November 2007.

In 2009, Danquah released his second solo studio album, Catch 22, which was mainly influenced by the electronic and alternative hip hop genres. He released his second single from the album, Catch 22, entitled "Take Me Back" with English singer Taio Cruz, which peaked at number 3 on the UK Singles Chart in January 2009. He then released the song "Number 1" (a collaboration with English band N-Dubz), which entered the European Hot 100 at number 6, on 26 April 2009. Danquah later released "Never Leave You" with English singer Amelle Berrabah, which entered the European Hot 100 at number 5, on 9 August 2009.

In 2010, Danquah released his third solo studio album, Third Strike, an electronic dance music studio album. On BBC Radio 1's Chart Show, it was revealed that the song "Number 1" is the first song in chart history anywhere in the world entitled "Number 1" ever to actually reach number one.

== Albums ==
=== Studio albums ===
List of albums, with selected chart positions
Title	Album details	Peak chart positions			Certifications
Title	Album details	UK	UK Dance	IRE	Certifications
Star in the Hood	Released: 13 August 2007; Label: Takeover Entertainment Ltd; Formats: CD, digital download	58	—	—	
Catch 22	Released: 17 August 2009; Label: Universal Island; Formats: CD, digital download	2	—	9	BPI: Gold
Third Strike	Released: 15 November 2010; Label: Universal Island; Formats: CD, digital download	48	2	—	
360° / The Cloud 9 LP	Released: 29 April 2016; Label: Cloud 9; Formats: Digital download	—	—	—	
"—" denotes a title that did not chart, or was not released in that territory.

=== Collaboration albums ===
List of collaborative albums, with selected details
Title	Album details
Tinchy Stryder vs. Maniac (with Maniac)	Released: 24 November 2008; Label: Eskibeat; Format: CD, LP, digital download

=== Mixtapes ===
List of mixtapes
Title	Mixtape details
Creeper Volume 2 (with Roll Deep)	Released: 2004; Label: Roll Deep; Formats: Cassette, digital download
I'm Back U Know	Released: 2 March 2006; Label: Boy Better Know; Format: Digital download
Lost and Found	Released: 24 October 2006; Label: Boy Better Know; Format: Digital download
Before the Storm	Released: March 2010; Label: Takeover Entertainment; Format: Digital download

== Extended plays ==
List of extended plays (EP), with selected details
Title	EP details
Cloud 9 The EP	Released: 31 March 2008; Label: Takeover Entertainment; Formats: digital download
Star in the Hood EP Vol. 1	Released: June 2009; Label: Takeover Entertainment; Formats: digital download
Star in the Hood EP Vol. 2	Released: July 2009; Label: Takeover Entertainment; Formats: digital download
III EP	Released: 27 September 2010; Label: Takeover Entertainment; Formats: digital download
The Wish List	Released: 24 December 2011; Label: Takeover Entertainment; Formats: digital download
Private Life in Public	Released: 18 August 2017; Label: Cloud 9; Formats: digital download
Change	Released: 19 July 2019; Label: Cloud 9; Formats: digital download

== Singles ==
=== As lead artist ===
List of singles, with selected chart positions, showing year released and album name
Title	Year	Peak chart positions					Certifications	Album
Title	Year	UK	UK R&B	UK Dance	IRE	SCO	Certifications	Album
"Breakaway"	2007	—	—	—	—	—		Star in the Hood
"Something About Your Smile" (featuring Cylena Cymone)	2007	—	—	—	—	—		Star in the Hood
"Mainstream Money"	2007	—	—	—	—	—		Star in the Hood
"Stryderman"	2008	73	14	—	—	—		Catch 22
"Take Me Back" (featuring Taio Cruz)	2009	3	1	—	16	—	BPI: Gold	Catch 22
"Number 1" (featuring N-Dubz)	2009	1	1	—	1	—	BPI: 2× Platinum	Catch 22
"Never Leave You" (featuring Amelle Berrabah)	2009	1	1	—	2	—	BPI: Gold	Catch 22
"You're Not Alone"	2009	14	—	—	21	13		Catch 22
"In My System"	2010	10	—	3	38	11		Third Strike
"Second Chance" (featuring Taio Cruz)	2010	22	5	—	35	19		Third Strike
"Let It Rain" (featuring Melanie Fiona)	2011	14	—	3	—	15		Third Strike
"Spaceship" (featuring Dappy)	2011	5	1	—	45	5	BPI: Silver	Non-album singles
"Off the Record" (featuring Calvin Harris and Burns)	2011	24	—	5	—	23		Non-album singles
"Bright Lights" (Note: Another version of the song entitled "Bright Lights Part II" is featured on Pixie Lott's second studio album, Young Foolish Happy.) (featuring Pixie Lott)	2012	7	3	—	19	6		Non-album singles
"Help Me"	2012	—	—	—	—	—		Non-album singles
"Misunderstood"	2014	—	—	—	—	—		Non-album singles
"ESG" (Takura)	2014	—	—	—	—	—		360° / The Cloud 9 LP
"Imperfection" (featuring Fuse ODG)	2015	—	17	—	—	—		Non-album single
"Leg Day (Remix)" (featuring feat. Capo Lee, AJ Tracey & Frisco)	2016	—	—	—	—	—		360° / The Cloud 9 LP
"Made It"	2016	—	—	—	—	—		Non-album singles
"Bros Dem" (featuring Donae'o & President T)	2016	—	—	—	—	—		Non-album singles
"Promise"	2019	—	—	—	—	—		Change
"On Them (featuring feat. Jme)"	2022	—	—	—	—	—		Non-album singles
"Got It"	2022	—	—	—	—	—		Non-album singles
"Have A Go (featuring feat. President & Silencer)"	2023	—	—	—	—	—		Non-album singles
"Till the Morning"	2025	—	—	—	—	—		Non-album singles
"Air Mile Gang"	2025		—	—	—	—	—	Non-album singles
"Pick Pick (featuring feat. Kojo Funds)"	2026	—	—	—	—	—		Non-album singles
"—" denotes a title that did not chart, or was not released in that territory.

=== As featured artist ===
List of singles, with chart positions, showing year released and album name
Title	Year	Peak chart positions			Album
Title	Year	UK	UK R&B	CAN	Album
"Where's Your Love" (Craig David featuring Tinchy Stryder and Rita Ora)	2008	58	—	—	Greatest Hits
"Give It All U Got" (Note: "Give It All U Got" was supposed to be the fourth single off Lil Jon's debut studio album, Crunk Rock. The song was left off the album when it was finally released in 2010.) (Lil Jon featuring Kee & Tinchy Stryder)	2009	—	—	90	
"Bring It" (Jodie Connor featuring Tinchy Stryder)	2011	37	11	—	TBA
"Lights On" (Wiley featuring Angel & Tinchy Stryder)	2013	9	—	—	The Ascent
"—" denotes a title that did not chart, or was not released in that territory.

=== Charity singles ===
List of charity singles, with selected chart positions, showing year released
Title	Year	Peak chart positions		Album
Title	Year	UK	IRE	Album
"I Got Soul" (Note: "I Got Soul" is a 2009 charity single by charity group War Child UK, recorded by Young Soul Rebels. It is a cover of The Killers' "All These Things That I've Done".) (as part of Young Soul Rebels)	2009	10	19	Non-album single
"Teardrop" (Note: "Teardrop" is a 2011 charity single covered by British singer-songwriter Gary Barlow for the charity group Children in Need, recorded by The Collective and produced by Labrinth. It is a cover of Massive Attack's 1998 hit single "Teardrop".) (as part of The Collective)	2011	24	—	We Are the Collective
"To Me, To You (Bruv)" (with Chuckle Brothers)	2014	92	—	Non-album single
"—" denotes a title that did not chart, or was not released in that territory.

=== Promotional singles ===
List of non-single songs, with selected chart positions, showing year released and album name
Title	Year	Peak chart positions	Album
Title	Year	UK	Album
"Gangsta?"	2010	67	Third Strike

=== Other charted songs ===
List of non-single songs, with selected chart positions, showing year released and album name
Title	Year	Peak chart positions		Certifications	Album
Title	Year	UK	UK Dance	Certifications	Album
"Game Over" (featuring Giggs, Professor Green, Tinie Tempah, Devlin, Example and Chipmunk)	2010	22	2	BPI: Silver	Third Strike

== Collaborations ==
List of guest appearances, with other performing artists, showing year released and album name
Title	Year	Other performer(s)	Album	Ref.
"U Were Always"	2002	Wiley, Dizzee Rascal	Street Anthems	
"Next Level"	2004	Wiley, Kano, J2K	Treddin' on Thin Ice	
"It's a Par"	2008	Wiley, Messy	Grime Wave	
"Rollin"	2008	Maniac, Roachee	Tinchy Stryder vs. Maniac	
"Loud!"	2008	Example, Frisco	What We Almost Made	
"Ed Hardy Party"	2009	Skepta	Microphone Champion	
"Man Dem"	2009	Chipmunk	I Am Chipmunk	
"Hello Good Morning (Remix)" (Note: Official UK Remix of Diddy and his band Dirty Money 2010 hit single, "Hello Good Morning", from their 2010 debut studio album, Last Train to Paris.)	2010	Diddy – Dirty Money, Tinie Tempah		
"Take The World"	2010	Bridget Kelly	Third Strike	
"Africa"	2010	Mdot-E, Tinie Tempah	Red Carpet	
"Spinnin' for 2012" (Note: "Spinnin' for 2012" is the Official Olympic Torch Song for the London 2012 Olympic Games. The song is a reworked version of a Speech Debelle original, with both Kwasi Danquah III and Dionne Bromfield rewriting the track's lyrics. The song has also been included on Bromfield's second studio album, Good for the Soul.)	2011	Dionne Bromfield	Good for the Soul	
"Gucci Time" (Sinden Remix)	2011	Gucci Mane, Swizz Beats	Sinden Presents Free Gucci 2	
"100K"	2011	Tinie Tempah, G FrSH, Krept & Konan	Happy Birthday	
"Up in Flames"	2012	Labrinth, Devlin	Electronic Earth	
"Tell Your Friends"	2012	Loick Essien	I.D Mixtape	
"O2"	2012	Angel, Sloth, A Star	In Between Time	

== See also ==
- List of songs recorded by Tinchy Stryder
- Tinchy Stryder videography
- Takeover Entertainment discography
