= List of songs recorded by Tinchy Stryder =

The following is a list of songs by Tinchy Stryder organized by alphabetical order. The songs on the, asparagus colored list, are all included in official label-released, albums, soundtracks and singles, but not white label or other non-label releases. Next to the song titles is the composer, writer, album, soundtrack or single on which it appears, and year of release. Remixes and live versions of songs are listed on the, ash grey colored list, below the original songs on the asparagus colored list, but clean, explicit, a cappella and instrumental tracks are not included.

== B ==
Song	Composer	Writer	Album	Year
"Breakaway"	Kwasi Danquah III	DaVinChe	Star in the Hood	2007
"Breathe"	Kwasi Danquah III	DaVinChe	Star in the Hood	2007
"Bright Lights" (featuring Pixie Lott)	Kwasi Danquah III	Victoria Louise Lott, Jarrad Rogers	Full Tank & Young Foolish Happy	2012

== F ==
Song	Composer	Writer	Album	Year
"Famous"	Kwasi Danquah III	Israel Cruz	Third Strike	2010

== G ==
Song	Composer	Writer	Album	Year
"Game Over" (featuring Chipmunk, Devlin, Example, Giggs, Professor Green and Tinie Tempah)	Kwasi Danquah III	Elliot Gleave, James Devlin, Nathaniel Thompson, Stephen Manderson, Patrick Okogwu, Jahmaal Fyffe	Third Strike	2010
"Gangsta?"	Kwasi Danquah III	TMS	Third Strike	2010
"Generation"	Kwasi Danquah III	Mojam	The Wish List	2011

Song	Writer	Album	Year
"Game Over" (featuring Dot Rotten, Fuda Guy, Ghetts, Griminal, Maxsta, Roachee, Slix and Wretch 32)	Joseph Ellis, Fuda Guy, Justin Samuel, Griminal, Maxsta, Roachee, Slix, Jermaine Scott	Third Strike	2010

== H ==
Song	Composer	Writer	Album	Year
"Help Me"	Kwasi Danquah III	Camille Purcell, Ollie Jacobs	End of Life on Earth	2012

== I ==
Song	Composer	Writer	Album	Year
"In My System"	Kwasi Danquah III	Ayak Thiik	Third Strike	2010

== L ==
Song	Composer	Writer	Album	Year
"Let It Rain" (featuring Melanie Fiona)	Kwasi Danquah III	Melanie Fiona, Emeli Sandé	Third Strike	2011

== M ==
Song	Composer	Writer	Album	Year
"Mainstream Money"	Kwasi Danquah III	Brandon Jolie	Star in the Hood	2007

== N ==
Song	Composer	Writer	Album	Year
"Never Leave You" (featuring Amelle)	Kwasi Danquah III	Taio Cruz	Catch 22	2009
"Number 1" (featuring N-Dubz)	Kwasi Danquah III	James Lavelle, Costadinos Contostavlos, Fraser T Smith	Catch 22 & Against All Odds	2009

Song	Writer	Album	Year
"Never Leave You" (featuring Bashy and Double S)	Ashley Thomas, Double S	Catch 22	2009
"Number 1" (featuring Kano)	Kane Robinson	Catch 22	2009

== O ==
Song	Composer	Writer	Album	Year
"Off The Record" (featuring Calvin Harris and Burns)	Kwasi Danquah III	TMS	Full Tank	2011

== R ==
Song	Composer	Writer	Album	Year
"Rollin"' (featuring Maniac and Delusion)	Kwasi Danquah III	Brandon Jolie, Delusion	Tinchy Stryder vs. Maniac	2008

Song	Writer	Album	Year
"Rollin" (featuring Maniac and Roachee)	Brandon Jolie, Roachee	Tinchy Stryder vs. Maniac & Catch 22	2008

== S ==
Song	Composer	Writer	Album	Year
"Second Chance" (featuring Taio Cruz)	Kwasi Danquah III	Taio Cruz	Third Strike	2010
"Something About Your Smile" (featuring. Cylena Cymone)	Kwasi Danquah III	Cylena Cymone, DaVinChe	Star in the Hood	2007
"Spaceship" (featuring Dappy)	Kwasi Danquah III	Costadinos Contostavlos, TMS	Full Tank & Bad Intentions	2011
"Stryderman"	Kwasi Danquah III	Fraser T Smith	Catch 22	2008

Song	Writer	Album	Year
"Stryderman" (featuring Wiley)	Richard Cowie	Catch 22	2008

== T ==
Song	Composer	Writer	Album	Year
"Take The World" (featuring Bridget Kelly)	Kwasi Danquah III	Ayak Thiik, TMS	Third Strike	2010
"Take Me Back" (featuring Taio Cruz)	Kwasi Danquah III	Taio Cruz, Fraser T Smith	Catch 22 & Rokstarr	2009

Song	Writer	Album	Year
"Take Me Back" (featuring Sway and Chipmunk)	Derek Safo, Jahmaal Fyffe	Catch 22	2009

== Y ==
Song	Composer	Writer	Album	Year
"You're Not Alone"	Kwasi Danquah III	Fraser T Smith	Catch 22	2009

== See also ==
- Videography
- Music discography
