= Takeover Entertainment discography =

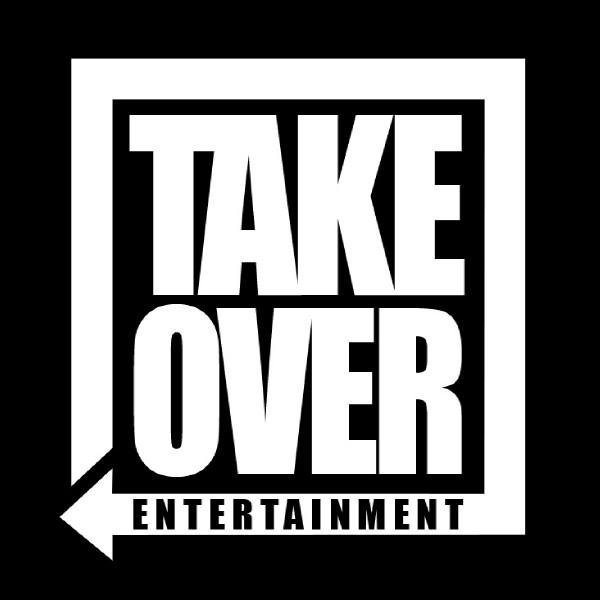

This is a list of albums released under Takeover Entertainment Limited.

== 2000s ==
=== 2007 ===
Information
Tinchy Stryder - Star in the Hood
- Released: 13 August 2011
- Singles: "Breakaway", "Something About Your Smile", "Mainstream Money"

=== 2008 ===
Information
Tinchy Stryder - Cloud 9 The EP
- Released: 31 March 2008

=== 2009 ===
Information
Tinchy Stryder - Star in the Hood EP Vol. 1
- Released: June 2009
Tinchy Stryder - Star in the Hood EP Vol. 2
- Released: July 2009
Tinchy Stryder - Catch 22
- Released: 17 August 2009
- Singles: "Stryderman", "Take Me Back", "Number 1", "Never Leave You", "You're Not Alone"

== 2010s ==
=== 2010 ===
Information
Giggs (rapper) - Let Em Ave It
- Released: 21 June 2010
- Singles: "Slow Songs", "Don't Go There", "Look What the Cat Dragged In", "Hustle On"
Tinchy Stryder - III EP
- Released: 27 September 2010
Tinchy Stryder - Third Strike
- Released: 15 November 2010
- Singles: "In My System", "Second Chance", "Game Over", "Let It Rain"

=== 2011 ===
Information
Tinchy Stryder - The Wish List
- Released: 24 December 2011

=== 2012 ===
Information
Ruff Sqwad - 2012
- Released: 24 January 2012
- Singles: "Mario Balotelli"
Dappy - Bad Intentions
- Released: 15 October 2012
- Singles: "No Regrets", "Rockstar", "Come with Me" "Good Intentions"
Tinchy Stryder - Full Tank
- Released: November 2012
- Singles: "Spaceship", "Off The Record", "Bright Lights", "Help Me"

== Upcoming studio album(s) ==
=== TBA ===
Information
Jodie Connor - Untitled
- Released: TBD
- Singles: "Now or Never", "Bring It", "Take You There"
Ria Ritchie - Untitled
- Released: TBD
- Singles: "Only One"
Tinchy Stryder - Untitled
- Released: TBD
- Singles: None
Giggs (rapper) - When Will It stop?
- Released: TBD
- Singles: None
Ruff Sqwad - Guns and Roses Volume 3
- Released: TBD
- Singles: None

== Upcoming studio album single(s) ==
Information
Dappy - "Good Intentions"
- Released: September 2012
- Album: Bad Intentions
- Record chart position: TBR
Tinchy Stryder - "Help Me"
- Released: September 2012
- Album: Full Tank
- Record chart position: TBR
