= Adam Powell (director) =

British music video director

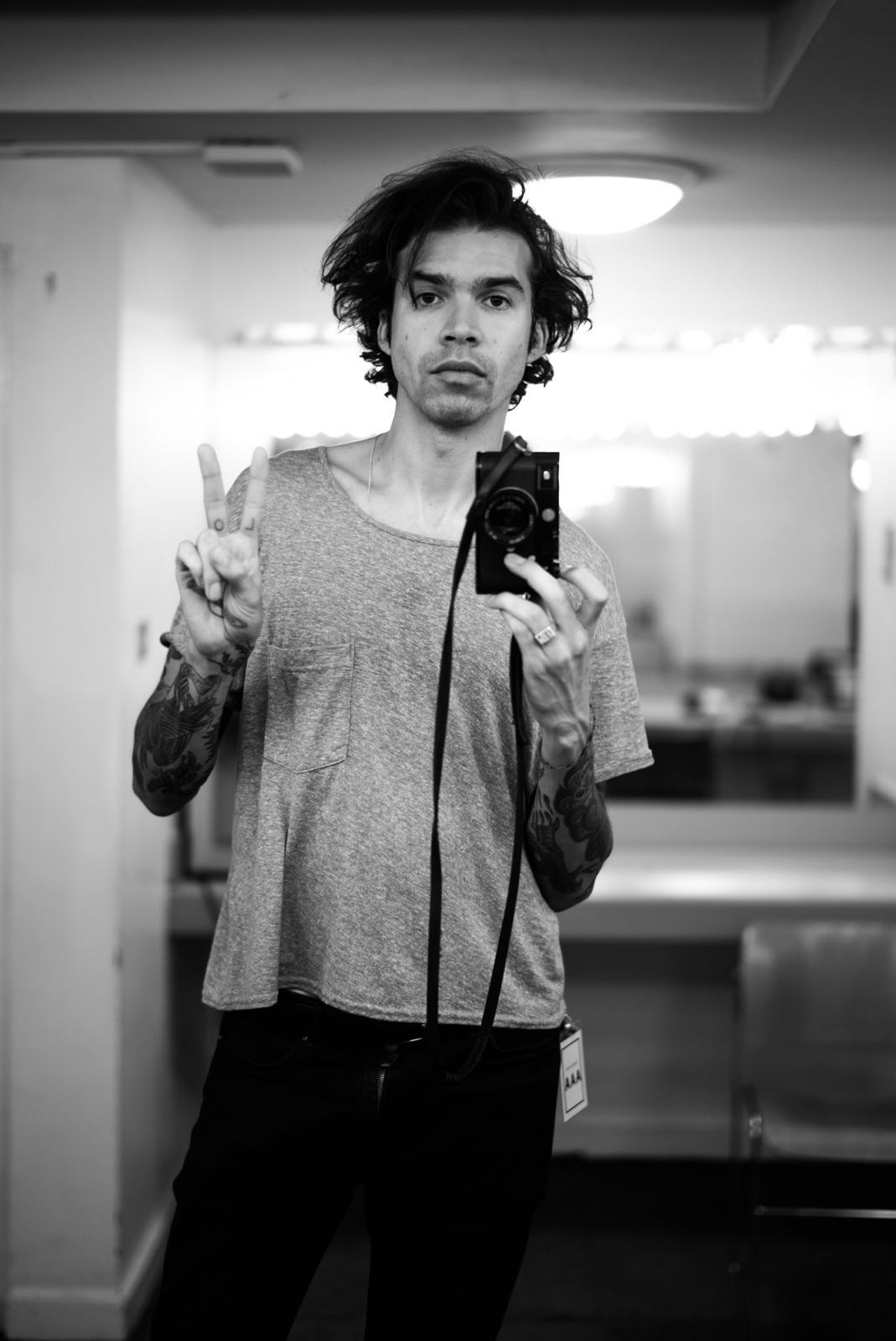
- Born: Adam Christopher Thurai Powell; 11 August 1981 (age 45); Hammersmith, London, England
- Occupations: Music video director, editor, photographer
- Years active: 2004–present
- Website: adam-powell.com

Adam Christopher Thurai Powell (born 11 August 1981) is a British director. His work directing music videos spans a wide range of genres, including hardcore, rock, hip-hop and pop. His portfolio includes many mainstream artists such as Bring Me the Horizon, Example, Jamie T, The 1975, and Charli XCX. He was nominated as Best New Director at the UK Music Video Awards in 2009. His video for The 1975 track "UGH!" was also nominated for 'Best Group Video' Award at the MTV VMA's in Japan.

== Career ==
Powell began his interest in film while shooting amateur skate videos, and editing them at home. After the initial buzz of editing these short clips to music, he began catering for bands who wanted him to create low budget music videos. He was able to build momentum as one of the UK's most prominent music video directors after signing for Black Dog Films, Ridley Scott Associates

In 2013, for the musician Sivu, Adam Powell made the decision to create a music video purely from the imagery shown while the artist was in an MRI machine. Of the result Powell explained, “The video is a collection of data gathered from MRI scans and is inspired by research into improving the management of children born with cleft lip and palate. I've just recently been obsessed with the idea of capturing images without conventional cameras/lenses.”

Adam Powell has also worked as an editor for James Copeman on Magnetic Man's "Anthemic" featuring P Money and Vato Gonzalez's "Badman Riddim (Jump)". Adam briefly stepped outside the realm of music videos when he took on the role as editor for Rose McGowan's directorial debut, in her short film 'Dawn' which premiered at the Sundance Film Festival. He has also worked alongside Swedish director Jonas Åkerlund as Second Unit director on The Rolling Stones’ "Doom And Gloom" and has also worked with Åkerlund as editor on commercials for various clients such as Lexus, H&M and Johnnie Walker.

== Videography ==
2004

"Only Tools And Corpses" for The Rotted

2005

"Bleeding June" for Blood Red Summer
"Untitled" for Life For Land

2006

"Nothing Tastes Like This" for Send More Paramedics
"Mr. Music Man" for The King Blues
"Firin'" for Data Flow
"Mr. Park's Hand?" for Sometimenever

2007

"Blood Fever" for Send More Paramedics
"The Stand" for Floors And Walls
"A Wasp In A Jar" for Down I Go
"High Road" for This Is Menace
"Bite Your Tongue and Walk Away" for The Fall, The Rise
"Indian 2" for *shels
"Buried At Sea" for Architects
"Always" for Architects
"The Blood Stays On The Blade" for Your Demise
"Black Art Number One" for The Ghost of a Thousand

2008

"He Spoke Of Success" for Open The Skies
"Kill 'Em Dead Cowboy" for NATO
"Silent Era" for From Grace
"They Told Me You Were Dead" for Shaped by Fate
"The Comedown" for Bring Me the Horizon
"Boulder" for The King Blues
"The Grotesque" for Johnny Truant
"Death Rides" for Johnny Truant
"Early Grave" for Architects

2009

"Fire Fire" for Jamie T
"Chelsea Smile" for Bring Me the Horizon
"The Vulture (Acts I & II)" for Gallows
"London Is The Reason" for Gallows
"I Got Love" for The King Blues
"Sticks 'n' Stones" for Jamie T
"Let's Hang The Landlord" for The King Blues
"Tear The Place Up" for Skunk Anansie
"The Road" for Frank Turner
"I Dread The Night" for Gallows
"Fireworks" for Tell It To The Marines
"The Sadness Will Never End" for Bring Me the Horizon
"The Man's Machine" for Jamie T
"Misery" for Gallows
"Grey Britain (Full Film)" for Gallows

2010

"Nine to Five" for Mouthwash
"14 Coleman St." for Great Cynics
"Don't Go There" for Giggs feat. B.o.B
"Emily's Heart" for Jamie T
"Liquid Confidence (Nothing to Lose)" for You Me at Six
"It's The Weekend" for MyToyBox
"25 Knives" for Sometimenever
"Look What the Cat Dragged In" for Giggs
"Headbutt" for The King Blues
"Gangsta?" for Tinchy Stryder
"Holiday" for The King Blues
"Hustle On" for Giggs
"Game Over" for Tinchy Stryder feat. Example, Devlin, Chipmunk, Professor Green & Tinie Tempah

2011

"Darling Buds Of May" for Viva Brother
"Look What I Done" for Maverick Sabre
"Changed the Way You Kiss Me" for Example
"Say Silence (Heaven & Earth)" for Tellison
"People F**K People" for Holy Show
"Redemption Days" for Josh Osho feat. Ghostface Killah
"Stay Awake" for Example
"Poseidon" for Down I Go
"People Help the People" for Birdy
"Midnight Run" for Example
"Nothing's Real but Love" for Rebecca Ferguson

2012

"Are You Not Entertained?" for Dot Rotten
"Too Good to Lose" for Rebecca Ferguson
"Squeeze" for Man Like Me
"London Town" for Man Like Me
"I'll Get Along" for Michael Kiwanuka
"Say Nothing" for Example
"Take The World" for Tinchy Stryder feat. Bridget Kelly

2013

"Better Man Than He" for Sivu
"Bodies" for Sivu
"Sex" for The 1975
"I Lost Myself" for Sivu
"Girls" for The 1975

2014

"Can't Stop Now" for Sivu
"One More Day (Stay with Me)" for Example
"Somebody Loves You" for Betty Who
"Heart Out" for The 1975
"Fossils" for Circa Waves
"You & I (Forever)" for Jessie Ware

2015

"Doing It" for Charli XCX feat. Rita Ora
"She Wants" for Sunset Sons
"Whisky Story" for Example
"About You" for Fine Print
"UGH!" for The 1975

2016

"Beats 1 Live In LA" for The 1975

2017

"Yuk Foo" for Wolf Alice

2018

"Love It If We Made It" for The 1975
"Narcissist" for No Rome feat. The 1975

2020

"If You're Too Shy (Let Me Know)" for The 1975
