= Ayak Thiik =

South Sudanese singer

- Born: Khartoum, Sudan
- Genres: R&B, neo soul, hip hop, EDM, pop
- Occupations: Singer-songwriter, composer, studio producer, voice teacher, musical arranger
- Instruments: Piano, keyboards, sampler, guitar, vocals
- Years active: 2002–present
- Labels: Cinematic Music Group; Universal Music Group; Takeover Roc Nation; Sony/ATV; BMG Chrysalis UK; Warner Music; Polydor; PB Management; Syco Music

Ayak Thiik (also known as "Ayak Tracks") is a Grammy nominated, South Sudanese-British singer-songwriter and vocal producer. She is primarily known for writing hit songs and appearing on vocals for artists like Diana Ross, Cee Lo Green, James Morrison ("You Make It Real"), Chip ("Until You Were Gone"), Tinchy Stryder ("Never Leave You and "In My System"), and Dappy ("No Regrets" and "Rockstar"), among others.

== Background ==
Thiik's love for music was evident at an early age, and she was able to sing long before she was able to talk. Thiik had signed a record deal with German record label Stereo Wonderland, Polydor, Universal and recorded an album – making her the first Sudanese artist to be signed by a major label worldwide.

Thiik entered and won the Princes Trust Urban Music Festival's – Unsigned Talent Search, in the United Kingdom. She ultimately won a spot in a line-up which featured Beyoncé, as well as Alicia Keys and a host of top UK artists.

== Song writing and vocal production ==
In 2006, Thiik wrote and featured on the Cincinnati native hip-hop producer Hi-Tek's second album, 'Hi-Teknology²: The Chip’. The track "Can we Go back" also featured Talib Kweli. Since then she has ventured into the house music world, working with German producers Milk & Sugar. Her dance music collaborations with Milk & Sugar have clocked up two consecutive UK chart toppers at number 1 and 2. Thiik's house music endeavors have taken her to Brazil, Singapore, Moscow, Russia and Lebanon.

Having spent 18 months working on her songwriting, she was offered a deal and signed by Takeover Entertainment. She has penned songs for Kelly Rowland, Mica Paris, Esmée Denters, JLS, Chip, Tinchy Stryder, The Wanted, Alexandra Burke, Lemar and Roc Nation's signed Bridget Kelly, among others.

Her vocals have also appeared on Tinchy Stryder's "Never Leave You" – Catch 22 album, "In My System", "Take the World" – Third Strike album, Kylie Minogue's "Everything is beautiful" – Aphrodite album, James Morrison's "You Make It Real – Songs For You Truths For Me album, Cheryl Cole's "Stand up" – 3 Words album, Cee-Lo Green's "Satisfied" – The Lady killer album, among others.

In 2010, Thiik gained her first UK Singles Chart record as co-writer on Chip's "Until You Were Gone" featuring Esmée Denters. This went into the UK singles charts as at No. 3. She also co-wrote Tinchy Stryder's No. 10 hit "In My System", on which she also appeared on vocals but not the music video.

In 2023 Thiik became the first South Sudanese person to be recognised by the recording Academy, for her work on the twenty-fifth studio album Thank You by American singer Diana Ross. The album received a nomination for Best Traditional Pop Vocal Album at the 65th Grammy Awards, Ross' first nomination since 1983.

== Solo career ==
Thiik recorded and released a studio album entitled, Voices in My Head. Her list of musical achievements continues. Thiik was featured on Liberty Bell Jolly Good TV Sky Arts 'Song Book' show by chance, after coming to the rescue of her hero and arguably the most successful songwriter of current generation Diane Warren who wrote the hits "Un-Break My Heart" (1996) by Toni Braxton, "How Do I Live Without You" (1997) by LeAnn Rimes, "I Don't Want to Miss a Thing (1998) by Aerosmith, and for many other artists. Taken aback by Thiik's voice, Diane Warren began writing songs for Thiik. A documentary chronicling was planned for production by the same team.

== Selected production and writing credits ==
| Date | Artist | Song | Album | Label | SW/P | Album/Record chart |
|---|---|---|---|---|---|---|
| 2006 | Hi-Tek | "Can We Go Back" | Hi-Teknology²: The Chip | Babygrande Records | SW | US Billboard 200: 38 |
| 2008 | James Morrison | "You Make It Real" | Songs for You, Truths for Me | Polydor Records | P | UK Singles Chart: 7 US Billboard 200: 49 UK Albums Chart: 3 |
| 2009 | Tinchy Stryder | "Never Leave You" | Catch 22 | Takeover | P | Euro Hot 100 Singles: 5 Irish Singles Chart: 2 UK Singles Chart: 1 Euro Top 100 Albums: 11 Irish Albums Chart: 9 UK Albums Chart: 2 |
| 2009 | Tata Young | "Ready For Love" | Ready for Love | Sony Music Thailand | SW | Thai Singles Chart : 1 |
| 2009 | Cheryl Cole | "Stand Up" | 3 Words | Fascination Records | P | Euro Top 100 Albums: 7 Irish Albums Chart: 2 UK Albums Chart: 1 |
| 2009 | JLS | "Private" | JLS | Epic Records | SW | Irish Albums Chart: 1 UK Albums Chart: 1 |
| 2010 | Chip | "Until You Were Gone" | I Am Chipmunk | Jive Records | SW | UK Singles Chart: 3 UK Albums Chart: 2 |
| 2010 | Kylie Minogue | " Everything is Beautiful" | Aphrodite | Parlophone | P | Australian Alb. Chart: 2 Euro Top 100 Albums: 1 US Billboard 200: 19 UK Albums Chart: 1 |
| 2010 | Tinchy Stryder | "In My System" | Third Strike | Takeover | SW/P | UK Singles Chart: 10 |
| 2010 | Tinchy Stryder | "Take the World" | Third Strike | Takeover | SW | —N/a |
| 2010 | Cee Lo Green | "Satisfied" | The Lady Killer | Elektra Records | P | US Billboard 200: 9 UK Albums Chart: 3 |
| 2011 | Dappy | "No Regrets" | Bad Intentions | Takeover | SW | UK Singles Chart: 1 |
| 2012 | Dappy | "Rockstar" | Bad Intentions | Takeover | SW | UK Singles Chart: 2 |
| 2012 | Marcus Collins | "It's Time" | Marcus Collins | RCA Records | SW | Scottish Alb. Chart: 8 UK Albums Chart: 7 |
| 2012 | Misha B | "Do You Think of me?" | TBA | Relentless Records | SW | UK Singles Chart: 9 |
| 2012 | Dappy | "Yin Yang" | Bad Intentions | Takeover | SW | UK Albums Chart: 6 |
| 2013 | Little Mix | "A Different Beat" | Salute | Syco | SW | Australian Alb. Chart: 4 US Billboard 200: 6 UK Albums Chart: 2 |
| 2014 | The Vamps | "Last Night" | Meet the Vamps | Mercury Records | SW | UK Singles Chart: 2 UK Albums Chart: 2 |
| 2014 | Yogi featuring Pusha T | "Burial" | Burial EP | Owsla | SW/P | TBA |
| 2014 | Perplexus (duo) featuring Charlie Brown (singer) | "Put you on" | | Sonus | SW/P | |
| 2014 | Robin Stjernberg | "Body Language" | | Lionheart Music Group | SW | Swedish Singles Chart: 1 |
| 2015 | The Prototypes | "Under" | City of Gold | Viper Recordings | SW/ P | UK Dance Chart: 22 |
| 2015 | Skrillex & Yogi featuring Pusha T, Moody Good & TrollPhace | "Burial" | | Owsla | SW/P | UK Singles Chart: 90 |
| 2016 | Nabiha | "Weapon" | | Sony Music | SW | |
| 2016 | Lali | "Boomerang" | Soy | Sony Music Argentina | SW | Argentine Albums (CAPIF): 1 |
| 2016 | Lost Frequencies | "Dance with Me" | Less Is More | Armada Music | SW | Belgian Albums Chart: 3 |
| 2017 | Nabiha | "Young" | | Sony Music | SW | |
| 2017 | KStewart | "Sex 4 breakfast" | | Warner Bros. Records | SW | |
| 2017 | Nano Omar | "Hold On" | | Warner Music Sweden | SW | Swedish Singles Chart: 3 |
| 2017 | Melody Day (band) | Kiss on the Lips | | LOEN Entertainment | SW | Non-album single |
| 2017 | Hot Source ft Ayak | "Patience" | | Island Records | SW | |
| 2017 | Paris and Simo ft Karen Harding | "Come as you are" | | INgrooves | SW | |
| 2018 | Wilkinson ft Sub Focus | "Take it up" | | RAM Records | SW/P | Belgian Singles Chart: 100 |
| 2018 | Hardwell & Wildstylez ft Kifi | "Shine a light" | | Revealed Recordings | SW | |
| 2018 | Claire Richards | "7 Billion" | "My Wildest Dreams" | Sony Music | SW | UK Albums Chart: 9 |
| 2019 | James Hype | "I Was Lovin' You" | | Get Together Records | SW/P | UK Singles Chart: 92 |
| 2021 | Diana Ross | "Come together" | "Thank you" | Decca Records | SW/P | UK Albums Chart: 7 |
