= III EP =

III EP may refer to:

- III EP (Family Force 5 EP)
- III EP (Tinchy Stryder EP)

== See also ==
- III the EP, by Mondo Generator, 2004
