= Famous (Tinchy Stryder song) =

- "Famous" cover

Song by Tinchy Stryder

from the album Third Strike
- Released: 8 November 2010
- Recorded: 2009–2010
- Genre: Rap rock
- Length: 4:01
- Label: Takeover Entertainment Limited
- Composer(s): Kwasi Danquah III
- Lyricist(s): Israel Cruz
- Producer(s): Israel Cruz

Tinchy Stryder singles chronology
"Game Over" (2010)	"Let It Rain" (2011)	"Spaceship" (2011)

Music video
- "Famous" on YouTube

"Famous" is a song by Tinchy Stryder, released as a promotional single from his third solo studio album, Third Strike. The song was also included on Stryder's fourth extended play, III EP. The song was written and produced by Australian producer Israel Cruz.

== Music video ==
A music video was made for the song, and directed by Tinchy Stryder and music video director Luke Monaghan, who also was one of the three directors of the video for Stryder's 2011 hit single Spaceship, and was uploaded to Tinchy Stryder's official YouTube channel on Thursday, 11 November 2010, at a total length of four minutes and eight seconds. The video was filmed in a Jet Center, and finds Stryder chopping out his rhymes and boasting, over "harsh lurching beats and heavy riffs, about "how people are jealous of him because he's famous", a line which he bellows at every opportunity, whilst the film camera is closely fixed on his every movement throughout the length of the video.
