= If You're Too Shy (Let Me Know) =

Single by the 1975

from the album Notes on a Conditional Form
- Released: 23 April 2020
- Genre: New wave; pop; synth-pop
- Length: 5:19; 3:59 (radio edit)
- Label: Dirty Hit; Polydor
- Songwriters: Matthew Healy; George Daniel; Adam Hann; Ross MacDonald
- Producers: Matthew Healy; George Daniel; Jonathan Gilmore

The 1975 singles chronology
"Jesus Christ 2005 God Bless America" (2020)	"If You're Too Shy (Let Me Know)" (2020)	"Guys" (2020)

Music video
- "If You're Too Shy (Let Me Know)" on YouTube

"If You're Too Shy (Let Me Know)" is a song by English band the 1975 from their fourth studio album, Notes on a Conditional Form (2020). The song was released on 23 April 2020 through Dirty Hit and Polydor Records as the sixth single from the album. It was written by band members Matty Healy, George Daniel, Adam Hann and Ross MacDonald. Production of the song was handled by Daniel and Healy alongside Jonathan Gilmore. English singer FKA Twigs provides operatic background vocals on the song's introduction, Rashawn Ross performs the trumpet and flugelhorn in the choruses, and Bob Reynolds performs the tenor and alto saxophone solo in the bridge. Videos of the band performing the song were widely circulated on social media several months prior to its official release, quickly becoming a fan-favourite, and resulting in a high degree of anticipation among their fanbase.

"If You're Too Shy (Let Me Know)" is a pop and synth-pop song composed in a retro style that draws heavily from the music of the 1980s. Its instrumentation consists of high-octave alternative guitars, drumbeat kicks, brass horns, sparkling 1980s-style synths, and digital samples. The song's maximalist production combines elements of funk, techno, indie pop, dance music and pop rock in its composition. Its introduction features elements of ambient and new-age. Lyrically, the song details Healy's growing obsession and sexual encounters with a woman he meets on the internet. In its exploration of online relationships, the song deals with themes of technology, cybersex, dependency and despondency. The song drew comparisons to the soundtracks of John Hughes' coming-of-age films, the works of Tears for Fears, Duran Duran and Bruce Springsteen, and the 1975's own pop-oriented tracks.

Upon release, "If You're Too Shy (Let Me Know)" was acclaimed by contemporary music critics, many of whom deemed it a standout from Notes on a Conditional Form. Specific praise was given to the production, retro 1980s style, and embodiment of The 1975's signature sound. The song later appeared on numerous year-end lists. It attained international chart success, peaking within the top five on the US Billboard Hot Rock & Alternative Songs and New Zealand Hot Singles charts, the top 20 in Scotland and Ireland, as well as number 50 in Belgium and number 85 in Australia. Domestically, the song reached number 14 on the UK Singles Chart, becoming the band's highest-charting single to date in the United Kingdom. A music video for the song was released on 23 April 2020. Directed by Adam Powell, the video features black and white visuals of The 1975 performing in front of a brick wall. It was well received by critics, who praised the simplicity and references to The 1975's early music videos.

== Background and release ==
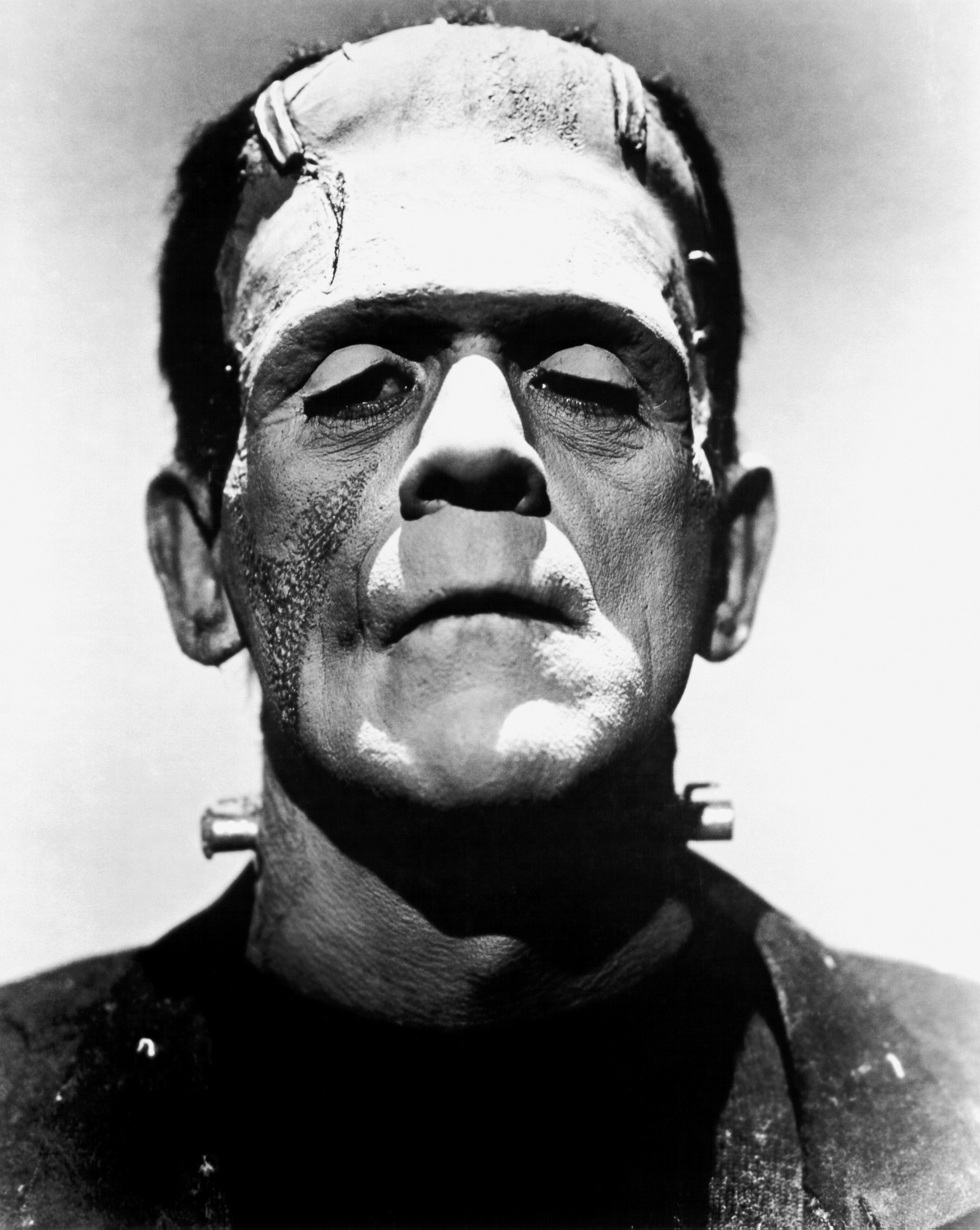
Healy compared the final version of "If You're Too Shy (Let Me Know)" to Frankenstein's monster (pictured).

In an interview with John Kennedy of Radio X, Healy called "If You're Too Shy (Let Me Know)" a "Frankenstein" song. Explaining further, the singer noted that more demos and different versions were created for "If You're Too Shy (Let Me Know)" than any of the band's previous tracks. The final version was created using four separate pieces and underwent one of the most exhaustive recording processes for Notes on a Conditional Form. The intro began as an ambient song in the vein of the Durruti Column, using a sample of an opera singer. The chorus of "If You're Too Shy (Let Me Know)" had already been written for a different song, and Healy was attempting to use the chords of its chorus to write a verse. Feeling frustrated with writer's block, Healy re-listened to the ambient piece and decided to combine it with "If You're Too Shy (Let Me Know)", giving the track an additional verse. The singer told Daniel: "We should make that fucking stomping, like Tears for Fears", and the two created the final version. Once the pair had completed it, they invited FKA Twigs to record the operatic vocals, to which she agreed. Speaking to Ryan Dombal of Pitchfork, Healy compared "If You're Too Shy (Let Me Know)" to a jigsaw puzzle that took time to put together, which he said "happens once [an album]".

"I'm not gonna talk shit on the amazing people that are fucking excited about our music [...] I'm just saying that you can never predict what people are gonna be like, man. We played ["If You're Too Shy (Let Me Know)"] and then after two nights we had like 20,000 people singing it live. People knew that shit before it was out and it was this huge thing people were obsessing about."

— Healy on the song's notoriety.

Prior to its official release, the 1975 debuted "If You're Too Shy (Let Me Know)" in Nottingham, England, on 15 February 2020, the opening night of their Music for Cars Tour in the United Kingdom. The band performed the song again at the O2 Arena in London on 21 February 2020, backed by box-style television screens. In his review of the performance, Andrew Trendell of NME called it the most promising song on Notes on a Conditional Form "by far", noting the track would likely be released as a future single. Videos of the 1975 performing "If You're Too Shy (Let Me Know)" began circulating on social media platforms, quickly becoming a fan-favourite and earning it a cult following among fans of the band. For nearly two months, fans of the 1975 used social media in an effort to have the band officially release the song, replying to their content with messages such as ""Drop 'Too Shy"". Healy himself recognized the anticipation, telling Brendan Wetmore of Paper he believed the band had an "inherent quality in our music that's really chimed in with people", which he attributed to the song's uplifting and self-reflective qualities. On 21 April 2020, the band announced on Twitter that "If You're Too Shy (Let Me Know)" would be released as the sixth single from Notes on a Conditional Form on 23 April 2020. The full-length version was officially released on 23 April 2020 alongside a shortened radio edit. Following its release, Healy jokingly revealed that they only released the song "'cause [their fans] wouldn't shut the fuck up about [it]".

== Music and lyrics ==
"If You're Too Shy (Let Me Know)"
A 30-second sample of "If You're Too Shy (Let Me Know)", showcasing the song's second chorus and a portion of Bob Reynolds' saxophone solo.

"If You're Too Shy (Let Me Know)" runs for a length of five minutes and nineteen seconds (5:19). Musically, it is a pop and synth-pop song composed in a retro style that draws heavily from the music of the 1980s. The track also incorporates elements from techno-funk, indie pop, dance music, power pop, pop rock, and pop-punk. According to sheet music published at Musicnotes.com by Sony/ATV Music Publishing, "If You're Too Shy (Let Me Know)" is set in the time signature of common time with a tempo of 120 beats per minute. The track is composed in the key of D major, with Healy's vocals ranging between the notes of A3 to B4. It follows a chord progression of D–A–D/F#–G in the verses, Em–D/F#–A in the pre-choruses, and Bm–Em–D/F#–G in the choruses. The song's maximalist production consists of buoyant, high-octave guitar licks, alternative guitars, drumbeat kicks, saxophone melodies, digitised samples, 1980s-style synths, deep grooves and impassioned horns. Lyrically, "If You're Too Shy (Let Me Know)" details Healy's online romance with a woman and documents a series of sexual encounters conducted over video chat. It explores themes of technology, cybersex, online relationships, dependency and despondency.

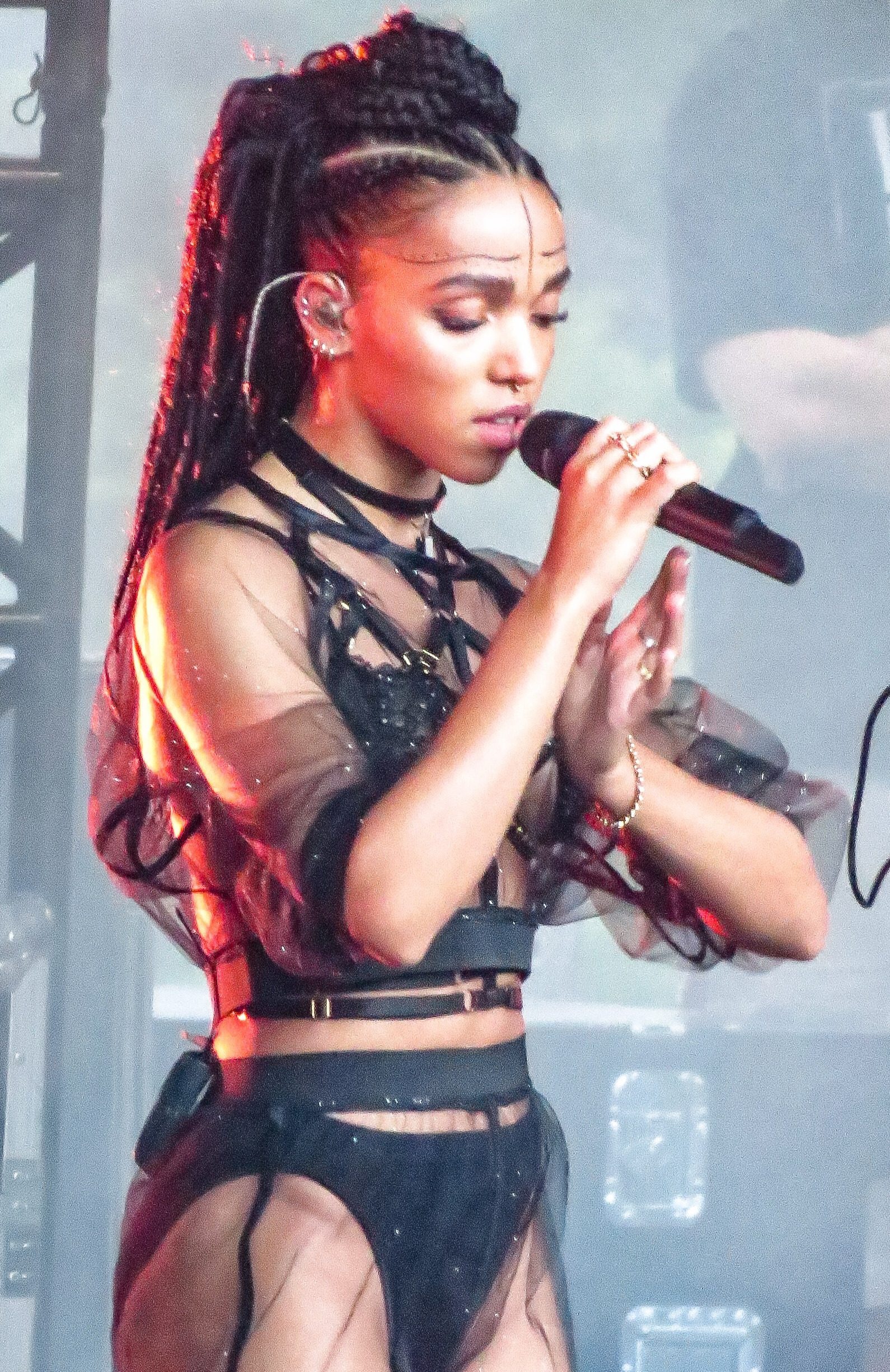
FKA Twigs (pictured) performs the song's ambient new-age introduction in an operatic tone.

"If You're Too Shy (Let Me Know)" opens with a minute-long "ghostly" new-age ambient instrumental, backed by ominous drones, celestial arpeggios, heavy reverb, and elements of glitch music. FKA Twigs provides the backing vocals in an ethereal, choral, wordless operatic style. A piercing guitar riff signals the beginning of the song, with Healy singing: "I see her online all the time". The verses experiment with tension, with Stephen Ackroyd of Dork calling the anticipation "almost palpable". As the song progresses, the singer becomes increasingly obsessed with the woman, attempting to reach his locked hotel room at 7 am to video call her ("I need to get back, I've gotta see the girl on the screen"). According to Mitch Mosk of Atwood Magazine, "If You're Too Shy (Let Me Know)" reaches its peak of "musical and emotional ecstasy" in the pre-chorus, before releasing the tension in a climatic "euphoric blast" in the chorus as Healy sings the hook: "She said / 'Maybe I would like you better if you took off your clothes / I wanna see and stop thinking / If you're too shy then let me know'". The chorus features a range of synths, most notably the glassy stabs that are reminiscent of the Roland D-50 synthesiser. The bridge utilizes a tenor and alto saxophone solo performed by Bob Reynolds, which Ali Shutler of NME described as "uproarious" and "perhaps the greatest endorphin release you'll find this side of lockdown."

Patricia Kolbe of Barricade Magazine compared "If You're Too Shy (Let Me Know)" to the soundtracks of coming-of-age movies directed by John Hughes, and noted similarities to "Everybody Wants to Rule the World" (1985) by Tears for Fears. She found the song's saxophone stylings comparable to the 1975's own "She's American" (2016), the drum pattern to "Heart Out" (2013), and the use of "magnetic" synth-pop to "It's Not Living (If It's Not with You)" (2018). Ben Kaye of Consequence of Sound called the song bright and "bubbly". Shutler interpreted a deeper meaning in the song. He observed relatable and vulnerable qualities ("There's something 'bout her stare that makes you nervous / And you say things that you don't mean"), along with the desire to escape the real world and use alcohol as courage ("Sometimes it's better if you think about it / This time, I think I'm gonna drink through it"). Brittany Spanos of Rolling Stone remarked that "If You're Too Shy (Let Me Know)" continued the thematic exploration of online relationships present on A Brief Inquiry into Online Relationships, while deeming it sonically reminiscent of Duran Duran. Jessie Atkinson of Gigwise called the song vulnerable and euphoric, comparing the guitar riffs to Bryan Adams, the saxophone solo to Bruce Springsteen and the overall melody to "Give It Up" (1982) by KC and the Sunshine Band. Lindsay Zoladz of The New York Times said the track mined a "bright, brassy sound of late-80s pop" to tell a story that would have sounded like science-fiction in that era: "a series of sexual encounters conducted over video chat".

== Critical reception ==
"If You're Too Shy (Let Me Know)" was acclaimed by contemporary music critics upon its release and appeared on numerous year-end lists. Reviewers praised its 1980s-style production and embodiment of the 1975's signature sound, favourably comparing the song to the music of Tears for Fears, Duran Duran, and the Cure. In her review of Notes on a Conditional Form, Samantha Small of Consequence of Sound deemed "If You're Too Shy (Let Me Know)" an "Essential Track". In her review of the parent album for The New York Times, Zoladz called the song "irresistible". Lizzie Mano of Paste deemed "If You're Too Shy (Let Me Know)" the best song on Notes on a Conditional Form, calling the track "effortlessly catchy" and saying listeners "could play it endlessly without it tiring". In his review of "If You're Too Shy (Let Me Know)" for Dork, Ackroyd called it a "swaggering, hip shaking monster" and metaphorically compared the song to a musical lightning rod, "pulling down raw, crackling energy from the heavens".

Claire Biddles of The Line of Best Fit declared "If You're Too Shy (Let Me Know)" the best song on its parent album, saying "it shows that The 1975 haven't lost the ability to make a piercingly resonant song in whatever genre or form they wish to". She opined that the song is emblematic of the band's signature sound, exemplified by a "hooky melody", an "effortless"-sounding multi-layered production, "a convincing pastiche of a micro-genre" and "deftly contemporary lyrics" that discuss the complexities of online and offline relationships. Ross Horton of musicOMH said the song was evocative of the band's "classic" sound. Sam Sodomsky of Pitchfork praised it as an album highlight, calling the song "the record's closest thing to a typical 1975 song—a glittery '80s arrangement, a ridiculous saxophone solo, a charmingly sleazy hook". Paul Schrodt of Slant Magazine wrote it is: "A quintessential 1975 song [...] a bit of everything—a maximalism that the 1975 pulls off like almost no one else". In another favourable review, Matt Collar of AllMusic wrote that "If You're Too Shy (Let Me Know)" is the only track on Notes on a Conditional Form reminiscent of the 1975's eponymous debut studio album (2013), commending the 1980s nostalgia and saxophone solo. Lauren Mullineaux of Beats Per Minute called it a "thrilling" example of the band's signature sound, commenting that the song places the listener in the leading role of a Hughes film.

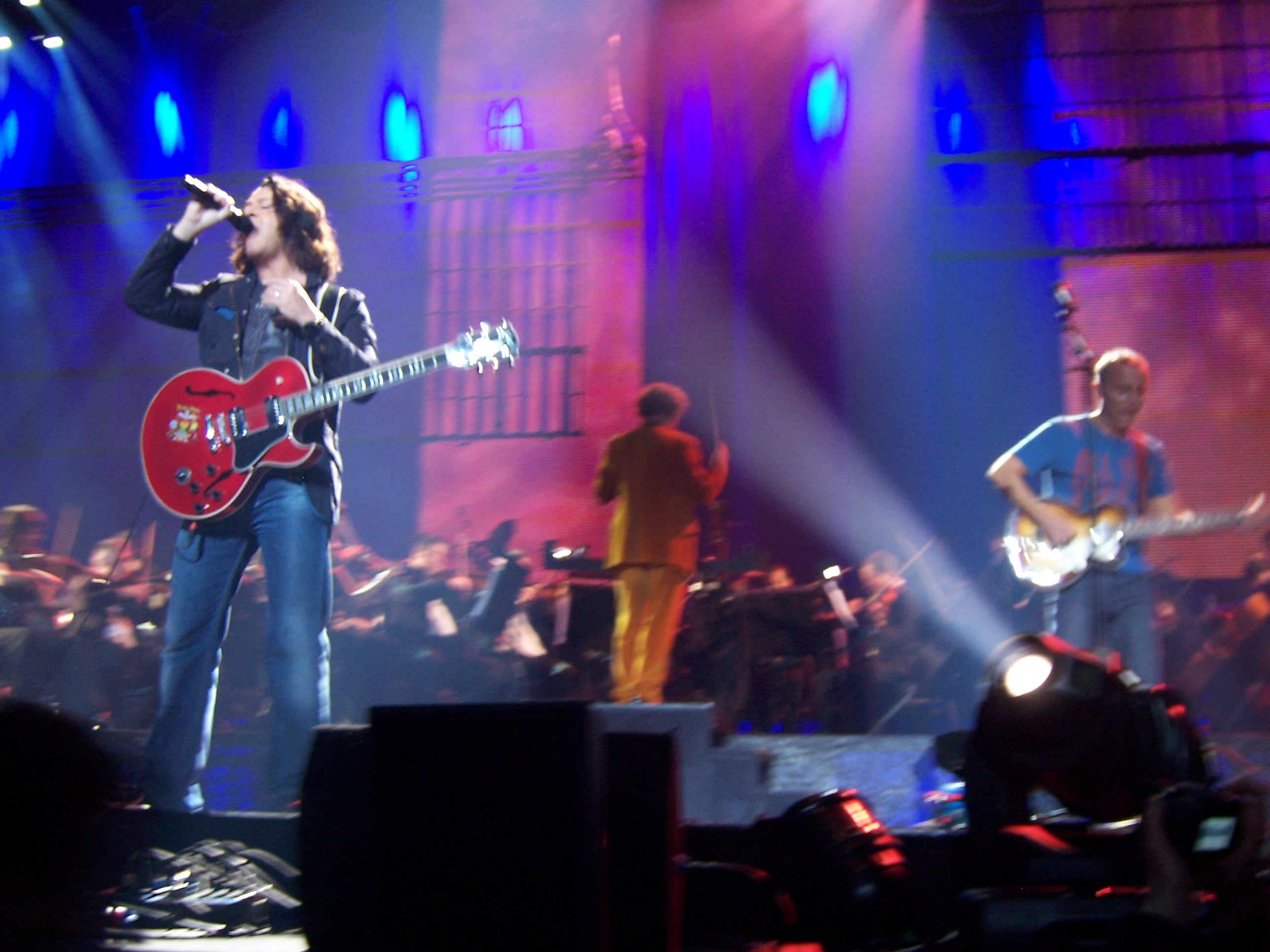
Numerous reviewers noted the song shared similarities with "Everybody Wants to Rule the World" (1985) by Tears for Fears (pictured).

In her weekly Rolling Stone special "Song You Need To Know" column, Spanos commented that "If You're Too Shy (Let Me Know)" and its message of communicating through video calls was especially relevant during the COVID-19 pandemic. She humorously remarked that the song: "quickly joins an elite pantheon of catchy songs about virtual sex, like 'NSync's 'Digital Get Down' [(2000)] and Soulja Boy's 'Kiss Me thru the Phone' [(2008)]". Conrad Duncan of Under the Radar gave the song a positive review, comparing it to Duran Duran and the Blue Nile and writing it "[combines] self-deprecating humor with sharp radio-friendly hooks". Joe Rivers of No Ripcord called the track "the best song Simple Minds never wrote". Chris Willman of Variety compared the song to "Everybody Wants to Rule the World" and the duo Hall & Oates, praising the "essential corniness of an '80s MTV pastiche" and favourably calling it a "slightly weird" pop song. The staff of Spin highlighted the song's successful implementation of 1980s music and ability to "document the sadness, hilarity, awkwardness and – just maybe – euphoria of the erotic Zoom call". The editorial team at DIY extolled the use of 1980s synths, saxophones and "saucy" lyrics, declaring it a "gem" and "quite the insatiable jam". Roisin O'Connor of The Independent observed similarities to the work of Tears for Fears and commended the song's "propulsive shuffle rhythm" and "twinkling synths". In his review of the single for NME, Shutler called the track "shamelessly huge" and an instant classic. He wrote that it represents the band at their "glorious, gargantuan best", drawing similarities to the dark, melodic emo of Tears for Fears, the Cure and the music of John Hughes films.

=== Year-end lists ===
Year-end lists for "If You're Too Shy (Let Me Know)"
Publication	Accolade	Rank	Ref.
The Guardian	Guardian Albums and Tracks of 2020	—N/a	
Billboard	The 100 Best Songs of 2020	44	
Coup de Main	The Best Songs Of 2020	—N/a	
The Diamondback	The Top 20 Songs of 2020	13	
DIY	DIY's Tracks of 2020	4	
Jacob Ganz (NPR)	The Best Music Of 2020: NPR Staff Picks	6	
Alim Kheraj (The Guardian)	Guardian Albums and Tracks of 2020	—N/a	
Scott Lapatine (Stereogum)	Stereogum's 60 Favorite Songs Of 2020	1	
The Line of Best Fit	The Best Songs of 2020 Ranked	17	
NME	The 50 Best Songs of 2020	22	
NPR	The 100 Best Songs of 2020	90	
Edwin Ortiz (Complex)	Our Favorite Songs and Albums of 2020	1	
Pitchfork	The 100 Best Songs of 2020	28	
Rolling Stone	The 50 Best Songs of 2020	38	
Spin	The 30 Best Songs of 2020	4	
Lindsay Zoladz (The New York Times)	Best Songs of 2020	7	

== Music video ==
A music video for "If You're Too Shy (Let Me Know)" was released on 23 April 2020. The video was directed by Adam Powell, while Jack Meredith served as assistant director. The role of production manager was handled by Ias Balaskas. Andrew Rawson and Harrison Imogen served as producer and executive producer, respectively. Anthony Neale was responsible for the video's art direction, with Kim Rance and Elaine Lynskey providing hair and makeup. Cinematically, Carlos Catalan served as director of photography, while Marco Alonso and Apostolos Katsamagkas acted as focus puller and second assistant camera, respectively. John Holloway edited the video, and the production company Editegg was brought in to handle post-production. Visually simplistic, it features the 1975 performing "If You're Too Shy (Let Me Know)" against a brick wall. The video is shot in high contrast black and white, interspersing expansive wide shots with close-up profiles of the individual band members. Brock Thiessen of Exclaim! called it "a simple yet effective approach". In her review of the song for Barricade Magazine, Kolbe interpreted the clip as an ode to the band's earlier visuals.

== Commercial performance ==
"If You're Too Shy (Let Me Know)" attained domestic and international chart success. In the 1975's native country of the UK, the song debuted and peaked at number 14 on the UK Singles Chart, becoming the band's highest-charting single to date in the country. In Scotland, "If You're Too Shy (Let Me Know)" reached number 18 on the Scottish Singles chart. Elsewhere in Europe, the song peaked at number 13 in Ireland and number 50 in Belgium. In Oceania, "If You're Too Shy (Let Me Know)" debuted and peaked at number 85 in Australia and number 4 on the New Zealand Hot Singles chart. In the United States, the song peaked at number five on the US Hot Rock & Alternative Songs chart and was ranked at number 89 on its year-end chart.

== Credits and personnel ==
Credits adapted from Notes on a Conditional Form album liner notes.

- Matthew Healy – composer, producer, guitar, vocals
- George Daniel – composer, producer, drums, keyboards, synthesizer
- Adam Hann – composer, guitar
- Ross MacDonald – composer, bass
- Jonathan Gilmore – producer, recording engineer
- Tahliah Debrett Barnett – background vocals
- Lemar Guillary – trombone
- Bob Reynolds – alto saxophone, tenor saxophone
- Rashawn Ross – flugelhorn, trumpet
- Jamie Squire – guitar
- John Waugh – saxophone
- Mike Crossey – mixer
- Robin Schmidt – mastering engineer

== Charts ==
=== Weekly charts ===
Chart performance for "If You're Too Shy (Let Me Know)"
Chart (2020)	Peak position
Australia (ARIA)	85
Belgium (Ultratip Bubbling Under Wallonia)	50
Ireland (IRMA)	13
Norway Radio (VG-lista)	33
New Zealand Hot Singles (RMNZ)	4
San Marino (SMRRTV Top 50)	16
Scottish Singles Sales (Official Charts)	18
UK Singles (Official Charts)	14
US Hot Rock & Alternative Songs (Billboard)	5
US Rock & Alternative Airplay (Billboard)	21

=== Year-end charts ===
2020 year-end chart performance for "If You're Too Shy (Let Me Know)"
Chart (2020)	Position
US Hot Rock & Alternative Songs (Billboard)	89

== Certifications ==
Certifications for "If You're Too Shy (Let Me Know)"
Region	Certification	Certified units/sales
United Kingdom (BPI)	Platinum	600,000^{‡}
^{‡} Sales+streaming figures based on certification alone.

== See also ==
- The 1975 discography
- List of songs by Matty Healy
