= Kinnda =

Swedish singer

- Also known as: Kinnda, Kee Hamid, Kee
- Born: Kinda Vivianne Hamid
- Occupations: Producer, Songwriter
- Years active: 2001–present

Kinda Vivianne Ingrosso (née Hamid; born 2 July 1982), better known as Kinnda, is a Swedish artist and songwriter. Kinnda is also known as Kee Hamid, Kee Ingrosso, or just Kee. Kinnda has been married to Swedish house producer Sebastian Ingrosso since 2011.

== Songwriting ==
- David Guetta featuring Rihanna - "Who's That Chick?" (2010)
- Bob Sinclar - "Rock the Boat" (2011)
- Jennifer Lopez featuring Pitbull - "On the Floor" (2011)
- Alesso - "Falling" (2017)
- Salvatore Ganacci - "Talk" (2017)

== Discography ==
=== Albums ===
- Kinnda (2001)

=== Singles ===
- "Freak You Out" (#12 in Sweden).
- "Lovestruck"
- "Don't Bring Sand to the Beach"
- "Give It All U Got" with Lil Jon and Tinchy Stryder (2009)
