= Perplexus (duo) =

Perplexus are a West London production duo, whose debut track conjures the modern soul of MNEK or John Newman. The two producers operate in the 2-step, electronic, mainstream-crossover field. James Walsh of DJ Mag wrote, "All that we know of Perplexus, those behind the track, is that they're a production duo buried deep in west London. A little more is known about remixers Penguin & Goose, who Perplexus have entrusted this deep house mix to."

Perplexus's debut hit "Put You On" premiered on The Line of Best Fit and was picked up and played by DJ EZ on his Kiss FM show. Further support from MTV, Indie Shuffle, Alftitude, Death By Electro, Flavour, Rio Ferdinand's No. 5 Mag has followed online. While support from further DJ's has arisen with Majestic at Kiss Fm and Ras Kwame at Capital Xtra. BBC Radio 1Xtra's DJ Cameo played it weekly, rising to Number 3 in his UKG Chart and Target who has been spinning it on his homegrown show on the station. The Deep House remix of the track was provided by New York-based Penguin & Goose and surfaced on 19 May, getting featured in DJ Mag. "Put You On" was released on 6 July 2014 via Sonus Music.
