= Third Strike (album) =

Studio album by Tinchy Stryder
- Released: 15 November 2010
- Recorded: 2009
- Genre: Hip-hop; grime; electro
- Length: 51:38
- Label: Takeover; Universal Island
- Producer: Kwasi Danquah III (co-executive); Fraser T Smith (co-exec.)

Tinchy Stryder chronology
III EP (2010)	Third Strike (2010)	The Wish List (2011)

Singles from Third Strike
- 1. "In My System" Released: 8 August 2010; 2. "Second Chance" Released: 2 November 2010; 3. "Let It Rain" Released: 24 January 2011

Third Strike is the third solo studio album by British rapper and singer Tinchy Stryder, and his second studio album with Universal Island Records. It was released on 15 November 2010. Prior to the release of Third Strike, Stryder featured on the grime collective Roll Deep's first compilation album, Street Anthems, which was released on 19 October 2009. Third Strike was preceded by a free downloadable extended play (EP), III EP.

== Background ==
The album is the follow-up to Styder's album Catch 22. Tinchy began recording his third studio album shortly after he completed his previous album, and would release a single from the album a whole year straight from the day he released his second studio album. He began working with Fraser T Smith who also worked on his second studio album. Taio Cruz produced the largely, along with Fraser T Smith.

== Collaborations ==
Third Strike features several artists, including, Amelle, who he collaborated with on his second studio album Catch 22 on the single "Never Leave You" where the pair gained a number one in the UK. The album features Taio Cruz who also featured on the Stryder's last album. The album also features artists affiliated with Roc Nation. Artists such as Melanie Fiona "Let It Rain", Alexis Jordan, and Bridget Kelly "Take The World". The song "Game Over" features six different artists, Example, Professor Green, Giggs, Devlin, Tinie Tempah and Chipmunk. Stryder also collaborated with Bluey Robinson on the song "Tomorrow". Eric Turner, who gained a number one single after featuring on Tinie Tempah's "Written in the Stars", also featured on the album.

== Reception ==
=== Critical reception ===
Professional ratings
Review scores
Source	Rating
Allmusic	3.5/5 stars
Metro	3.5/5 stars

The Metro.co.uk stated that the album was "stick to an uninspiring but winning formula of cheesy dance beats and soaring female vocals." while following on to say that the album "The dubsteppy breakdown on epic pop song Tomorrow signals the mainstream’s embrace of certain initially fringe urban sounds." and later awarding the album three out of five stars. NME said that "opener Take the World proves that Tinchy Stryder is a good rapper, but the song is ruined by a sugary-sweet female chorus." However, they gave praise to the songs "In My System" and "Gangsta?". "In My System" features Tinchy rapping the grime equivalent of a Hallmark card over woozy keyboards and futuristic synths. "Gangsta?", finds him boasting, over turgid beats and cyber-synths, about his Twitter feed "f***ing with some anthems" and "having meetings with the president", a line which he bellows at every opportunity. They gave the album 5 out of 10. David Jeffries from AllMusic gave it a 3.5/5 and stated that "the album throws so much polish at the listener that the sheen is blinding, but when it comes to short bursts of well-dressed swagger, Third Strike provides Flo Rida-sized results".

=== Commercial performance ===
Third Strike peaked at number 2 on the UK Dance Chart, but did not chart as high as Catch 22 on the main UK album chart when released. It only peaked at number 48 on the UK Albums Chart despite his previous album Catch 22 peaking at number 2.

== Singles ==
- "Gangsta?" was released as a promotional single in the UK on 28 May 2010, charting at a peak of 67. Although "Game Over" charted at 22, Gangsta? did not chart in the UK Top 40.
- The first official single from the album was "In My System". Stryder performed the song live on GMTV, and he later appeared on BBC Radio 1's Live Lounge to promote the single. "In My System" was released officially on 8 August 2010, where it charted at number 10 on the UK singles charts.
- The second official single from the album was "Second Chance", which featured R&B artist, Taio Cruz, who he has also recorded a duet with Stryder on his previous album. The single was promoted by performing the single live at the MOBO Awards 2010. The single was released on 2 November 2010. Where it peaked at number 22 in the UK.
- The song "Famous" was released on 8 November 2010 as a digital download. A music video was released in promotion of the song.
- The song "Game Over" was released on 15 November 2010 as a digital download. The track featured six different rap artists, Giggs, Professor Green, Tinie Tempah, Devlin, Example and Chipmunk. It charted on the UK Singles Chart, reaching #22. The song was also performed at the MOBO Awards 2010, along with "Second Chance".
- The song "Take the World" was released on 22 November 2010 as a digital download. A music video was released in promotion of the song.
- The third and final official single was "Let It Rain", a song featuring Melanie Fiona. It was released on 24 January 2011.

== Track listing ==
No.	Title	Writer(s)	Producer	Length
1.	"Take the World" (featuring Bridget Kelly)	Kwasi Danquah; Ayak Thiik; Tom Barnes; Pete Kelleher; Ben Kohn	TMS	4:23
2.	"In My System"	Danquah; Fraser T Smith; Thiik	Fraser T Smith	3:33
3.	"Famous"	Danquah; Israel Cruz	Israel Cruz	4:01
4.	"Tomorrow" (featuring Bluey Robinson)	Danquah; James Fauntleroy	Nathan Retro	3:42
5.	"Gangsta?"	Danquah; Barnes; Kelleher; Kohn	TMS	2:33
6.	"Stereo Sun" (featuring Eric Turner)	Eshraque "iSHi" Mughal; Eric Turner; Michel Zitron	iSHi	3:16
7.	"Second Chance" (featuring Taio Cruz)	Danquah; Smith; Taio Cruz	Fraser T Smith	3:28
8.	"Never Know"	Danquah; Ritchie	Nathan Retro	3:34
9.	"Game Over" (featuring Giggs, Professor Green, Tinie Tempah, Devlin, Example and Chipmunk)	Danquah; Nathaniel Thompson; Stephen Manderson; Patrick Okogwu; James Devlin; Charlie Bernardo; Elliot Gleave; Mughal; Jahmaal Fyffe	iSHi	5:20
10.	"Let It Rain" (featuring Melanie Fiona)	Danquah; Ritchie; Emeli Sandé	Nathan Retro	3:40
11.	"Remember"	Danquah; Ritchie	Nathan Retro	3:31
12.	"Together" (featuring Alexis Jordan)	Danquah; Smith; Ina Wroldsen	Fraser T Smith	3:42
13.	"Til the End" (featuring Amelle Berrabah)	Danquah; Shahid Khan; Sandé	Naughty Boy	3:22
14.	"My Last Try" (featuring Eric Turner)	Danquah; Mughal; Turner	iSHi	3:33
15.	"Walk This Road" (hidden track)	Danquah; Barnes; Kelleher; Kohn	TMS	3:33

== Chart performance ==
Chart (2010)	Peak position
UK Albums Chart	48
UK Download Chart	16
UK Dance Chart	2

== Release history ==
Date	Format	Label
15 November 2010	CD, Digital Download	Takeover Entertainment Limited & Universal Island Records
