= Give It All U Got =

Single by Lil Jon featuring Kee
- Released: November 3, 2009
- Recorded: 2009
- Genre: Hip house; synth-pop; dance-pop
- Length: 3:40
- Label: BME; Universal Republic
- Songwriters: Bilal Hajji; Jonathan Smith; Kinda Hamid; William Holmes
- Producers: Lil Jon; RedOne

Lil Jon singles chronology
| "I Do" (2009) | "Give It All U Got" (2009) | "Watagatapitusberry" (2010) |

Tinchy Stryder singles chronology
| "You're Not Alone" (2009) | "Give It All U Got" (2009) | "In My System" (2010) |

"Give It All U Got" is a song by Lil Jon, released as the fourth single from his debut studio album, Crunk Rock. It was released digitally on November 3, 2009, via iTunes The song features Kee (Kinnda) and it was produced by RedOne. The song was left off the album when it was finally released in 2010.

"Give It All U Got", which features Kee on the original version and also features British rapper Tinchy Stryder on the official remix (along with Kee), peaked at 90 on the Canadian Hot 100.

There is also a remix by Laidback Luke.
