= Gangsta? (Tinchy Stryder song) =

Promotional single by Tinchy Stryder

from the album Third Strike
- Released: 28 May 2010
- Recorded: 2009–2010
- Genre: Hardcore hip hop, rap rock
- Length: 2:35
- Label: Takeover Entertainment Limited
- Composer: Kwasi Danquah III
- Lyricists: Kwasi Danquah III (Co-Lyricist); TMS (Co-Lyricist)
- Producer: TMS

Music video
- "Gangsta?" on YouTube

"Gangsta?" is a song by recording artist Tinchy Stryder. It was released as a promotional single on 28 May 2010. It was produced by TMS and co-written by Stryder and TMS, and included on Stryder's third studio album, Third Strike. It charted at number sixty-seven on the UK Singles Chart, becoming Stryder's second song to chart outside the UK top 40, since the single Stryderman from his second solo studio album, Catch 22 charting at seventy-three.

== Music video ==
Screenshots from "Gangsta?"

An image of Tinchy Stryder in a scene in the music video for "Gangsta?".

An image of Tinchy Stryder in a 2nd scene in the music video for "Gangsta?".

The music video for "Gangsta" was directed by Adam Powell and Tinchy Stryder, and is approximately four minutes and seventeen seconds in length. It was uploaded to Stryder's YouTube channel on Thursday 26 May 2010. The video finds Stryder in two different intermodal containers, an office, and a dark parking garage, standing in front of his Gold Record wall plaque, wearing a Varsity Jacket from Star In The Hood, later changing into a Jay-Z black colored Roc Nation T-shirt, boasting, over turgid beats and cyber-synths, about his Twitter feed "f***ing with some anthems" and "having meetings with the president", a line which he bellows at every opportunity and is later joined by Tinie Tempah, who uses the same lyrics that he used in Stryder's song "Game Over". Stryder closes the music video by entering his white colored "Rolls-Royce Phantom" car, where he is accompanied by a female, who is believed to be Jodie Connor, and then his "Rolls-Royce Phantom" car drives out of an intermodal container. The video has now reached over 1.5 million views on Stryder's YouTube channel.

== Chart performance ==
Chart (2010)	Peak position
UK Singles (OCC)	67

== Release history ==
Region	Date	Format
United Kingdom	28 May 2010	Digital Download
