= Star in the Hood EP Vol. 2 =

EP by Tinchy Stryder
- Released: July 2009
- Recorded: 2009
- Genre: Grime
- Label: Takeover Entertainment Limited
- Producer: Brandon Jolie

Tinchy Stryder chronology
Star in the Hood EP Vol. 1 (2009)	Star in the Hood EP Vol. 2 (2009)	Catch 22 (2009)

Star in the Hood EP Vol. 2 is the third extended play (EP) by recording artist Tinchy Stryder. It was released in July 2009 by Takeover Entertainment prior to the release of Stryder's second solo studio album, Catch 22, which was released on 17 August 2009. The EP is the second of a two-part free downloadable EP. Its cover art is a photo with a tribute to Michael Jackson and was made during the Catch 22 promo shoot.

== Track listing ==
No.	Title	Writer(s)	Producer(s)	Length
1.	"1 Of Us"	Kwasi Danquah III	Brandon Jolie	3:04
2.	"Rate Man"	Kwasi Danquah III	B. Jolie	2:44
3.	"Go Get Em"	Kwasi Danquah III	B. Jolie	2:12
4.	"Yes Or No" (Freestyle)		B. Jolie	3:18
5.	"Money" (Freestyle 2006)		B. Jolie	4:09
6.	"Take Me Back (Maniac Remix)"	Kwasi Danquah III, B. Jolie	B. Jolie	3:43
7.	"Working For Days (Live)"	Kwasi Danquah III	B. Jolie	3:14
