= Take the World (song) =

- "Take The World" cover

Promotional single by Tinchy Stryder featuring Bridget Kelly

from the album Third Strike
- Released: 22 November 2010
- Recorded: 2009–2010
- Genre: R&B, British hip hop
- Length: 4:23
- Label: Takeover Entertainment Limited
- Composer: Kwasi Danquah III
- Lyricists: Ayak Thiik (Co-Lyricist); TMS (Co-Lyricist)
- Producer: TMS

Music video
- "Take the World" on YouTube

"Take the World" is a promotional single released by British rapper Tinchy Stryder from this third studio album, Third Strike. The song was co-written by Takeover Entertainment singer-songwriter Ayak Thiik, and produced by TMS who also produced Stryder's promotional single "Gangsta?". It features vocals from American singer-songwriter Bridget Kelly. British singer Cherri V performs Kelly's part when the song is performed live. Prior to the song being recorded, Bridget Kelly had in the past regularly filled in for Alicia Keys when performing the song "Empire State of Mind" with Jay-Z.

== Music video ==
Tinchy Stryder and Bridget Kelly in a scene in the music video for "Take The World".

The music video for the song was directed by Adam Powell and Kwasi Danquah III, and was uploaded to Stryder's YouTube channel on Wednesday, 17 November 2010, at a total length of three minutes and forty-two seconds. The video is set in black and white scenes and finds Stryder chopping out his rhymes over big synths and big beats in an empty, dusty warehouse cut with scenes from Battersea Power Station and a ship's control room for an added cinematic touch. Bridget Kelly makes her music video debut, where she unleashes powerful coloratura soprano vocals.

== Release history ==
Region	Date	Format
United Kingdom	22 November 2010	Digital Download
