= In My System =

2010 single by Tinchy Stryder

Single by Tinchy Stryder featuring Ayak Thiik

from the album Third Strike
- Released: 8 August 2010
- Recorded: 2010
- Genre: Electro-hop; hip house; acid house
- Length: 3:33
- Label: Takeover Entertainment Limited; Universal Island Records
- Songwriter(s): Kwasi Danquah III (Composer); Ayak Thiik (Lyricist)
- Producer(s): Fraser T Smith

Tinchy Stryder singles chronology
"Give It All U Got" (2009)	"In My System" (2010)	"Second Chance" (2010)

Music video
- "In My System" on YouTube

"In My System" is a single by recording artist Tinchy Stryder. It was the first single from his third studio album Third Strike. It was released on 8 August 2010 as a digital download and on 9 August 2010 as a CD single. The single features uncredited vocals from co-writer Ayak Thiik.

== Critical reception ==
Robert Copsey of Digital Spy gave the song a positive review stating: "[Stryder's] latest effort picks up smoothly where last year's 'You're Not Alone' left off. Thankfully, its combination of relatable rhymes and hazy summer synths ensure his formula remains both timely and fresh, resulting in another surefire radio smash."

== Music video ==
A music video was made for the single and was filmed in Barbados and features label-mate and good friend Jodie Connor. It premiered on Tinchy Stryder's YouTube channel on 28 June 2010.

== Track listing ==
CD single
No.	Title	Length
1.	"In My System" (Original Mix)	3:33
2.	"In My System" (Extended Mix)	5:16
3.	"In My System" (True Tiger Mix)	3:48
Total length:		12:37

Digital download
No.	Title	Length
1.	"In My System" (Original Mix)	3:33
2.	"In My System" (Ian Carey Mix)	5:16
3.	"In My System" (True Tiger Mix)	3:48
Total length:		12:37

== Chart performance ==
"In My System" charted at number 10 on the UK Singles Chart on 15 August 2010, becoming Tinchy Stryder's fourth UK top 10 hit and number 3 on the UK Dance Chart.

Chart (2010)	Peak position
Ireland (IRMA)	38
UK Dance (OCC)	3
UK Singles (OCC)	10

== Release history ==
Date	Format	Label
8 August 2010	Digital download	Takeover Entertainment Limited & Universal Island Records
9 August 2010	CD single	Takeover Entertainment Limited & Universal Island Records
