= Bright Lights (Tinchy Stryder song) =

2012 single by Tinchy Stryder

Single by Tinchy Stryder featuring Pixie Lott
- Released: 2 March 2012
- Recorded: 2011
- Genre: R&B; hip hop; dance-pop
- Length: 3:27
- Label: Takeover Entertainment Limited; Universal Island
- Songwriters: Kwasi Danquah III; Pixie Lott; Jarrad Rogers
- Producer: Jarrad Rogers

Tinchy Stryder singles chronology
"Teardrop" (2011)	"Bright Lights" (2012)	"Help Me" (2012)

Pixie Lott singles chronology
"Kiss the Stars" (2012)	"Bright Lights" (2012)	"Nasty" (2014)

Music video
- "Bright Lights" on YouTube

"Bright Lights" is a single by British rapper Tinchy Stryder. The song is a collaboration with British singer-songwriter Pixie Lott. It was meant to be the third official single taken from his fourth studio album Full Tank, but Full Tank was scrapped, making it a non-album single. It was released on 2 March 2012 as a digital download. The single was co-written by Stryder and Lott alongside its producer Jarrad Rogers.

== Background ==
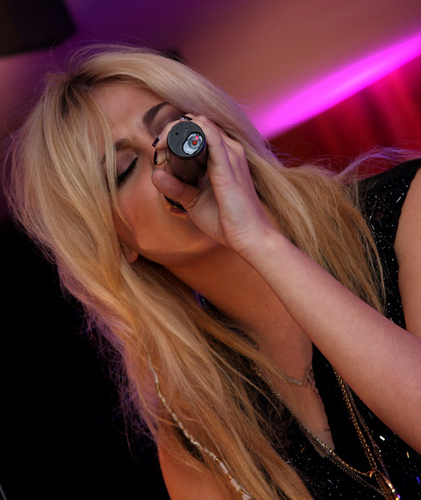
A second part of the song was released initially from Pixie Lott's (pictured) second album, Young Foolish Happy.

The collaboration between Stryder and Lott came about after the pair met at the 2011 Brit Awards ceremony, and after developing a friendship, decided to record a song together. Collaborating with producer and songwriter Jarrad "Jaz" Rogers, the pair came up with the idea of a story which could be told from both the female and male perspective. After recording two different versions of the song, Lott took the female perspective version, and included it on her second studio album, Young Foolish Happy, labelling it "Bright Lights (Good Life)" Part II. Critics stressed that it was very unusual for Part II to be released before Part I, as generally, a sequel follows the success of the main version. Nonetheless, Part II was released as part of Young Foolish Happy on 11 November 2011. Part I premiered on 3 January 2012, and thus, it is this version which will be released as a single. The single was released on 2 March 2012.

== Music video ==
The music video was directed by Dale Resteghini. The main version of "Bright Lights (Good Life)", told in the male perspective, premiered in the form of a music video which was uploaded to Stryder's official VEVO account on 3 January 2012, at a total length of three minutes and thirty-four seconds. The video features Stryder and Lott performing the song in an underground warehouse, with clips from throughout Stryder's career playing in the background. The video premièred on Digital Spy and music TV channels on 5 January 2012.

== Track listing ==
Digital download
No.	Title	Length
1.	"Bright Lights" (featuring Pixie Lott)	3:27
2.	"Bright Lights" (CASSETTi Remix)	4:01
3.	"Bright Lights" (Instrumental)	3:24
4.	"Generation" (featuring Alex Gaskarth)	3:08
Total length:		13:59

== Charts ==
=== Weekly charts ===
Chart (2012)	Peak position
Europe (Euro Digital Songs)	13
Hungary (Rádiós Top 40)	13
Ireland (IRMA)	19
Romania (Airplay 100)	62
Scottish Singles Sales (Official Charts)	6
Slovakia Airplay (ČNS IFPI)	36
UK Hip Hop/R&B (Official Charts)	3
UK Singles (Official Charts)	7

=== Year-end charts ===
Chart (2012)	Position
UK Singles (OCC)	196

== Release history ==
Date	Format	Label
2 March 2012	Digital download	Takeover Entertainment Limited; Universal Island Records
