= Second Chance (Tinchy Stryder song) =

Single by Tinchy Stryder featuring Taio Cruz

from the album Third Strike
- B-side: "F64"
- Released: 31 October 2010
- Recorded: 2009
- Genre: Electronic, R&B
- Length: 3:28
- Label: Takeover Entertainment Limited; Universal Island Records
- Songwriter(s): Kwasi Danquah III (Composer); Taio Cruz (Lyricist)
- Producer(s): Fraser T Smith

Tinchy Stryder singles chronology
"In My System" (2010)	"Second Chance" (2010)	"Game Over" (2010)

Taio Cruz singles chronology
"Dynamite" (2010)	"Second Chance" (2010)	"Shine a Light" (2010)

"Second Chance" is a single by recording artist Tinchy Stryder. It is the second single from his third studio album Third Strike. It was released on 31 October 2010 as a digital download and on 1 November 2010 as a physical single. The song also features vocals from singer Taio Cruz. A music video was made for the single and was premiered on Tinchy Stryder's YouTube channel on 24 September 2010.

== Track listing ==
No.	Title	Length
1.	"Second Chance" (Radio Edit)	3:28
2.	"Second Chance" (Future Freakz Remix Edit)	3:22
3.	"Second Chance" (Future Freakz Remix)	6:09
4.	"F64"	2:41
Total length:		15:40

== Chart performance ==
Chart (2010)	Peak position
Europe (European Hot 100 Singles)	33
Ireland (IRMA)	35
Scotland (OCC)	19
UK Hip Hop/R&B (OCC)	5
UK Singles (OCC)	22
UK Download (Official Chart Company)	22

== Release history ==
Date	Format	Label
31 October 2010	Digital download	Takeover Entertainment Ltd & Universal Island Records
1 November 2010	CD single	Takeover Entertainment Ltd & Universal Island Records
