= The Wish List (EP) =

EP by Tinchy Stryder
- Released: 24 December 2011
- Recorded: 2011
- Genre: Grime; bassline; hardcore hip hop
- Length: 27:34
- Label: Takeover Entertainment Limited
- Producer: David Nkrumah & Prince Rapid (Record executives)

Tinchy Stryder chronology
| Third Strike (2010) | The Wish List (2011) | 360° / The Cloud 9 LP (2016) |

The Wish List is the fifth and final of five EPs by recording artist Tinchy Stryder. It was released on 24 December 2011 by Takeover Entertainment as a free downloadable EP prior to the release of Stryder's cancelled fourth solo studio album, Full Tank.

The EP's cover art is a graphic image of Stryder with, computer-generated imagery as a background of the broken portrait standing on top of a building. The image was made during the Full Tank promo shoot.

The song "Oh No" was the B-side of Stryder's 2011 UK Singles Chart top-five hit "Spaceship" and the song "Generation" was the B-side of Stryder's 2011 single "Off the Record" featuring Calvin Harris.

== Track listing ==
| No. | Title | Writer(s) | Producer(s) | Length |
|---|---|---|---|---|
| 1. | "Oh No" | Kwasi Danquah III | David Dawood | 3:29 |
| 2. | "Stick Up" | David Nkrumah | Prince Rapid | 4:15 |
| 3. | "Mario Balotelli" (with Ruff Sqwad) | Kwasi Danquah III | P. Rapid | 4:25 |
| 4. | "Grime Veterans" (featuring Ghetts) | Kwasi Danquah III, Justin Samuel | David Nkrumah | 3:16 |
| 5. | "A Test" | Kwasi Danquah III | D. Nkrumah | 2:30 |
| 6. | "Welcome To The Jungle" | Kwasi Danquah III | P. Rapid | 1:54 |
| 7. | "Flashbacks" | Kwasi Danquah III | P. Rapid | 4:18 |
| 8. | "Generation" | Kwasi Danquah III | Mojam | 3:09 |
