= Help Me (Tinchy Stryder song) =

Single by Tinchy Stryder
- Released: 30 September 2012
- Recorded: 2012
- Genre: Hip hop
- Length: 3:36
- Label: Takeover Entertainment Limited
- Songwriter(s): Kwasi Danquah III; Camille Purcell; Ollie Jacobs
- Producer(s): Art Bastian

Tinchy Stryder singles chronology
"Bright Lights" (2012)	"Help Me" (2012)	"Lights On" (2013)

Music video
- "Help Me" on YouTube

"Help Me" is a song by British rapper Tinchy Stryder, and was released on 30 September 2012, as the fourth single from his cancelled fourth studio album Full Tank. Full Tank was scrapped so Help Me became a non-album single. The song, produced by Art Bastian, was written by Tinchy Stryder, Camille Purcell and Ollie Jacobs, and features uncredited vocals by Camille Purcell.

== Background ==
The single was announced during an interview with Digital Spy, uploaded on 12 July 2012, and Tinchy Stryder announcing he is now reinvented, and that with "Help Me" – It reaches out religiously to God. "Help Me" is incorporated with female verses and vocals.

The track was co-written by Kwasi Danquah III, Camille Purcell and Ollie Jacobs, and was produced by Art Bastian.

== Music video ==
A music video was made for "Help Me", and it was filmed in New Orleans, Louisiana. The accompanying music video sees Tinchy Stryder performing the track in a poverty-stricken neighbourhood.

Other scenes focus on Christian iconography, statues and buildings, directly representing the chorus's lyrics of "God, help me".

== Credits and personnel ==
- Songwriter – Kwasi Danquah III, Ollie Jacobs, Camille Purcell
- Production – Art Bastian
- Mixing – Jeremy Wheatley
- Label – Takeover Entertainment Limited

== Release history ==
Release history and formats for "Help Me"
Country	Date	Format	Label
Various	30 September 2012	Digital download	Takeover Entertainment Limited
