= III EP (Tinchy Stryder EP) =

EP by Tinchy Stryder
- Released: 27 September 2010
- Recorded: 2010
- Genre: Grime; bassline; British hip hop
- Label: Takeover Entertainment Limited
- Producer: David Nkrumah & Prince Rapid (Record executives)

Tinchy Stryder chronology
Before the Storm (2010)	III EP (2010)	Third Strike (2010)

Singles from III EP
- 1. "Champions" Released: December 2010; 2. "Famous" Released: February 2011

III EP is the fourth EP by recording artist Tinchy Stryder. It was released on 27 September 2010 by Takeover Entertainment as a free downloadable EP prior to the release of Stryder's third solo studio album, Third Strike, which was released on 15 November 2010.

The EP's cover art is a graphic image of Stryder with the, Third Strike logo, as a background in different shades of the colour green. The image was made during the Third Strike promo shoot.

The only singles released from the EP were track 1 "Champions" featuring Ruff Sqwad and track 2 "Famous".

== Track listing ==
No.	Title	Writer(s)	Producer(s)	Length
1.	"Champions" (featuring Ruff Sqwad)	Tinchy Stryder, Fuda Guy, Slix, Dirty Danger, Rapid	Dirty Danger	3:39
2.	"Famous"	Israel Cruz	Israel Cruz	3:44
3.	"Closing In" (featuring Stutta & Roachee)	Tinchy Stryder, Stutta, Roachee	Show 'N' Prove	3:18
4.	"Up In Flames" (featuring Labrinth & Devlin)	Tinchy Stryder, Labrinth, Devlin	Labrinth	3:11
5.	"Barclays" (Freestyle)	Tinchy Stryder	Teddy	2:20
6.	"Once Again"	Tinchy Stryder	Rapid	3:46
7.	"Salute Me"	Tinchy Stryder	Rapid	3:39
