= Stryderman =

Single by Tinchy Stryder

from the album Catch 22
- Released: 20 July 2008
- Genre: Electropop; R&B; electronic
- Length: 3:35
- Label: Takeover Entertainment Limited; Universal Island Records
- Songwriters: Kwasi Danquah III (Composer); Fraser T Smith (Lyricist)
- Producer: Fraser T Smith

Tinchy Stryder singles chronology
"Mainstream Money" (2007)	"Stryderman" (2008)	"Where's Your Love" (2008)

Music video
- "Stryderman" on YouTube

"Stryderman" is the lead single from recording artist Tinchy Stryder's second studio album, Catch 22. The single was released on 20 July 2008. The single was included on BBC Radio 1's C Playlist and eventually debuted at number 73 on the UK Singles Chart, becoming Stryder's first single to chart on the UK Singles Chart.

== Critical reception ==
Gavin Martin of The Mirror gave the song the following review: "Wearing his mean, East London street cred on his sleeve, Tinchy, aka Kwasi Danquah III, is an independently-marketed star who's built a reputation selling own-brand T-shirts, appearing on Mike Skinner records, and has the support of rap power broker DJ Tim Westwood. So far, so predictable, an impression compounded by the workaday sound - dirty buzz bass to the fore, and standard ghetto superhero boasting. Easy, Stryder."

== Track listing ==
CD single / Digital download
No.	Title	Length
1.	"Stryderman" (BBC Radio 1 Mix)	2:59
2.	"Stryderman" (Alternative Remix) (featuring Wiley and Kano)	3:50
3.	"Breathe" (Non-Album Track)	3:27
Total length:		11:38

== Charts ==
Chart (2008)	Peak position
UK Singles (Official Charts)	73

== Release history ==
Date	Format
21 July 2008	Digital download
8 August 2008	CD single
