= Let It Rain (Tinchy Stryder song) =

2011 single by Tinchy Stryder

Single by Tinchy Stryder featuring Melanie Fiona

from the album Third Strike
- Released: 27 January 2011
- Recorded: 2010
- Genre: R&B; electronic
- Length: 3:40
- Label: Takeover Entertainment Limited; Universal Island
- Composer(s): Kwasi Danquah III
- Lyricist(s): Emeli Sandé; Melanie Fiona
- Producer(s): Nathan Retro

Tinchy Stryder singles chronology
"Game Over" (2010)	"Let It Rain" (2011)	"Bring It" (2011)

Melanie Fiona singles chronology
"Gone and Never Coming Back" (2011)	"Let It Rain" (2011)	"4 AM" (2011)

Music video
- "Let It Rain" on YouTube

"Let It Rain" is a single by British rapper Tinchy Stryder. The song was produced by Takeover Entertainment producer Nathan Retro. It is the third and final single from his third studio album Third Strike, and It was released on 24 January 2011 as a digital download. The single also features vocals from Grammy Award winning Canadian singer Melanie Fiona and has thus far peaked at number 14 on the UK Singles Chart.

== Critical reception ==
Nick Levine of Digital Spy gave the song a positive review stating:

With his last two singles stalling outside the UK top 20, his Third Strike album yet to threaten the UK top 40, and the Brits panel forgetting conveniently that he exists, it's hard to avoid the conclusion that pretty much every clap of his grime-pop crossover thunder has been stolen by another fashion-conscious MC from our fair capital whose semi-comic nom de plume begins with "T".

This latest album spin-off is likely to help him grab it back. Stryder's Made-it-through-against-the-odds rhymes are as earnest as ever, and Canadian soul belter Melanie Fiona turns in a fairly mighty vocal, but, as midtempo electro-R&B tunes go, 'Let It Rain' is a bit like a family saloon that's due its MOT: perfectly serviceable but not terribly exciting. Not half as exciting, it has be [sic] said, as a similarly-themed recent offering from a certain Mr Tin....

== Track listing ==
Digital download
No.	Title	Length
1.	"Let It Rain" (Album Version)	3:40
2.	"Let It Rain" (Club Junkies Club Mix)	7:26
3.	"Let It Rain" (7th Heaven Club Mix)	8:05
4.	"Let It Rain" (Craze & Hoax Remix)	3:41
Total length:		22:52

== Chart performance ==
"Let It Rain" debuted on the UK Singles Chart at number 103 on 9 January 2011. The following week, the single rocketed up the UK Singles Chart, jumping 65 places to number 38; marking Stryder's ninth UK Top 40 hit and fourth consecutive UK Top 40 single to have been released from Third Strike. On 23 January 2011, the single climbed a further 12 places to number 25 on the UK Singles Chart. On 30 January 2011, the single climbed a further 11 places to number 14 on the UK Singles Chart.

=== Weekly charts ===
Chart (2011)	Peak position
UK Dance (OCC)	3
UK Singles Downloads (OCC)	14
UK Singles (OCC)	14

=== Year-end charts ===
Chart (2011)	Position
UK Singles (Official Charts Company)	193

== Release history ==
Date	Format	Label
27 January 2011	Digital download	Takeover Entertainment Limited & Universal Island Records
30 January 2011	Digital download	Takeover Entertainment Limited & Universal Island Records
