= You're Not Alone (Tinchy Stryder song) =

Single by Tinchy Stryder

from the album Catch 22
- B-side: "Stryderman (Live)"
- Released: 26 October 2009 (download); 2 November 2009 (CD)
- Recorded: 2009
- Genre: Electronic
- Length: 3:50
- Label: Takeover Entertainment Limited; Universal Island Records
- Songwriters: Kwasi Danquah III (Composer); Fraser T Smith (Co-Lyricist); Tim Kellet (Co-Lyricist); Robin Taylor-Firth (Co-Lyricist); Patrick Okogwu Jr. (Co-Lyricist)
- Producer: Fraser T Smith

Tinchy Stryder singles chronology
"I Got Soul" (2009)	"You're Not Alone" (2009)	"Give It All U Got" (2009)

Music video
- "You're Not Alone" on YouTube

"You're Not Alone" is a song composed by British recording artist Tinchy Stryder. The song was released as the fifth and final single from Stryder's second studio album, Catch 22 on 2 November 2009. On the week of the album's release, the track charted at No. 50 in the UK, based mostly on hype around the track which had received its first play on the BBC Radio 1 chart show the previous week. Tinchy Stryder performed the song at the MOBO Awards 2009 on 30 September, it then entered the top 40 on the UK Singles Chart on 10 October 2009 at number 32, next week on 17 October it climbed to number 14 in the UK, it dropped to number 15 in its 3rd week in the UK top 40. The song interpolates "You're Not Alone", a hit in 1997 for the band Olive. Olive claimed in an interview they would hope Tinchy Stryder would return the favour and collaborate with them on a song for their upcoming album.

== Reception ==
The song was praised by The Guardian for its "powerfully nagging hook" and "unshakeable chorus". Nick Levine of Digital Spy gave the song and a positive review stating: "That whopping great chorus sounds as ace as ever, Stryder's rhymes are simple and good-natured, and Fraser T Smith's production gleams like the gold medallion Tinchy hangs round his neck."

== Music video ==
The music video premiered on the Star in the Hood (company) Blog on 19 September 2009. The video features Tinchy Stryder in various scenes around empty streets in the London Docklands at night, paralleling Olive's video for the original version in which Tim Kellet, Robin Taylor-Firth and Ruth-Ann Boyle can be seen in similar Paris locations.

== Track listing ==
CD single / Digital download
No.	Title	Length
1.	"You're Not Alone" (Full Length Version)	3:50
2.	"You're Not Alone" (Red Top Remix)	3:38
3.	"You're Not Alone" (Lost Daze Radio Edit)	3:11
4.	"Stryderman" (Live)	5:22
Total length:		13:11

== Charts ==
=== Weekly charts ===
Chart (2009)	Peak position
Czech Republic Airplay (ČNS IFPI)	35
European Hot 100 Singles (Billboard)	23
Ireland (IRMA)	21
Russia Airplay (TopHit)	38
UK Singles (OCC)	14

=== Year-end charts ===
Chart (2009)	Position
Russia Airplay (TopHit)	141
UK Singles Chart	142
