= Bridget Kelly =

American singer

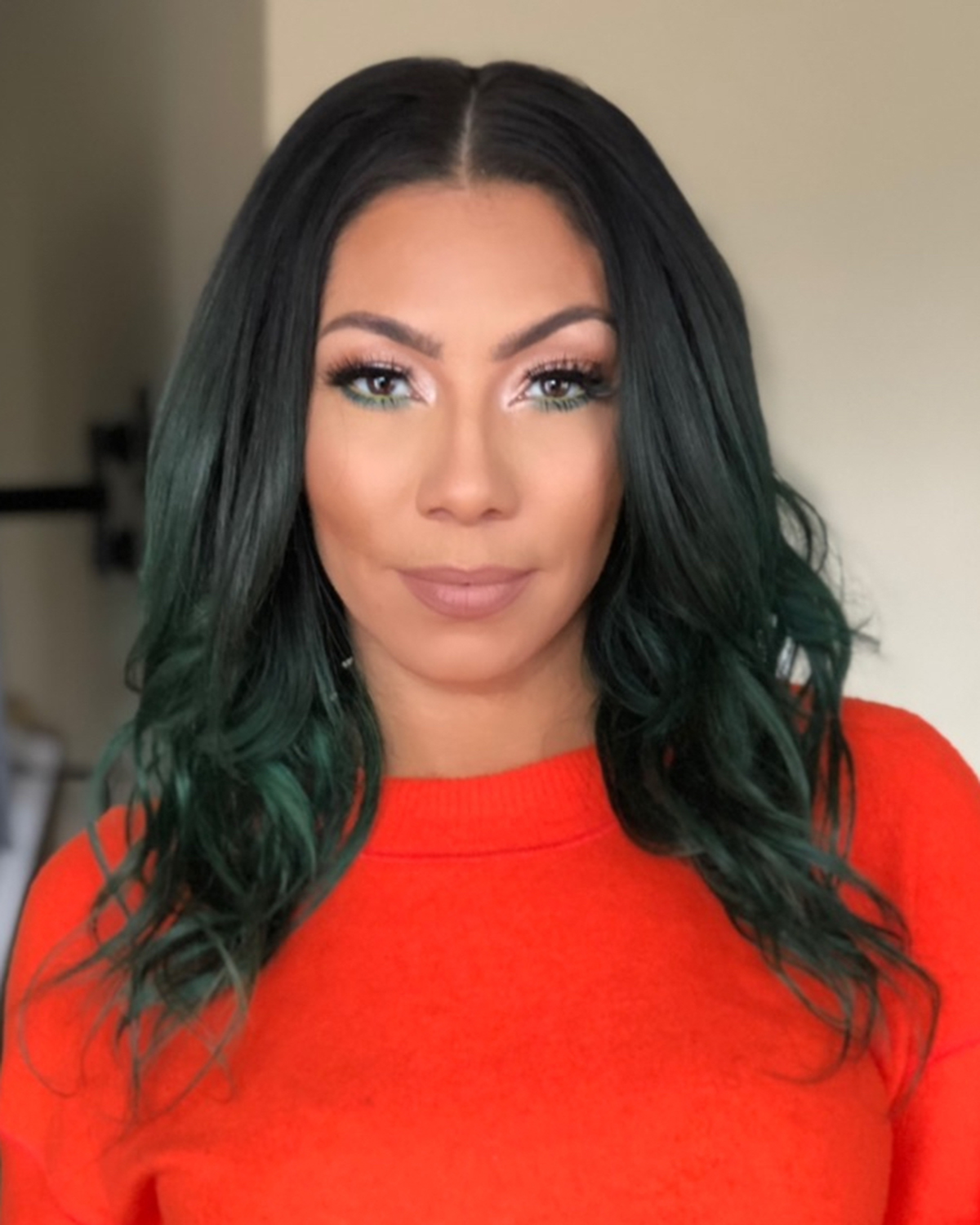

Background information
- Born: Bridget Kelly; April 8, 1986 (age 40); New York City, U.S.
- Genre: R&B
- Occupations: Singer, songwriter
- Years active: 2008–present
- Label: EMPIRE The Initiative Group
- Website: iambridgetkelly.net

Bridget Kelly (born April 8, 1986) is an American singer and songwriter from New York City. Kelly, an R&B recording artist, has written songs for Kelly Clarkson. In 2008, she secured a recording contract with American rapper and hip-hop mogul Jay-Z's record label Roc Nation.

== Biography ==
=== 1986–2010: Early life and career beginnings ===
Bridget Kelly, who is of Bahamian and Irish descent, was born on April 8, 1986, in New York City. She is a graduate of Fiorello H. LaGuardia High School of Music & Art and Performing Arts in Manhattan. In 2008, she signed a record deal with Jay-Z's Roc Nation. Kelly has regularly filled in for Alicia Keys, when performing the song "Empire State of Mind" with Jay-Z, including performances on the Friday Night with Jonathan Ross, as well as Later...with Jools Holland show, the Coldplay, Viva la Vida tour, and the 9/11 memorial service. Kelly also performed with Jay Z during a performance at the MTV Europe Music Awards 2009. She performed "Empire State of Mind" at Coachella Valley Music and Arts Festival as well as Bonnaroo Music Festival in summer 2010, with Jay-Z. Kelly also performed "Empire State of Mind" with Jay-Z on Saturday Night Live on May 8, 2010, as well as Rock am Ring on June 4 and T in the Park on June 12, 2010. She also joined Jay-Z during "Empire State of Mind" at Peace & Love in Borlänge, Sweden; at Summer Sonic 2010 in Chiba, Japan in August 2010, at Chiba Marine Stadium; and at Yankee Stadium on September 13, 2010.

Kelly made her first magazine cover appearance in the September 2010 issue of Honey Magazine. In the interview to go along with the cover shoot, she describes her music as a fusion of R&B, soul and rock with influences coming from Alicia Keys, Alanis Morissette and Pink.

=== 2011–2013: Every Girl and Cut to... Bridget Kelly ===
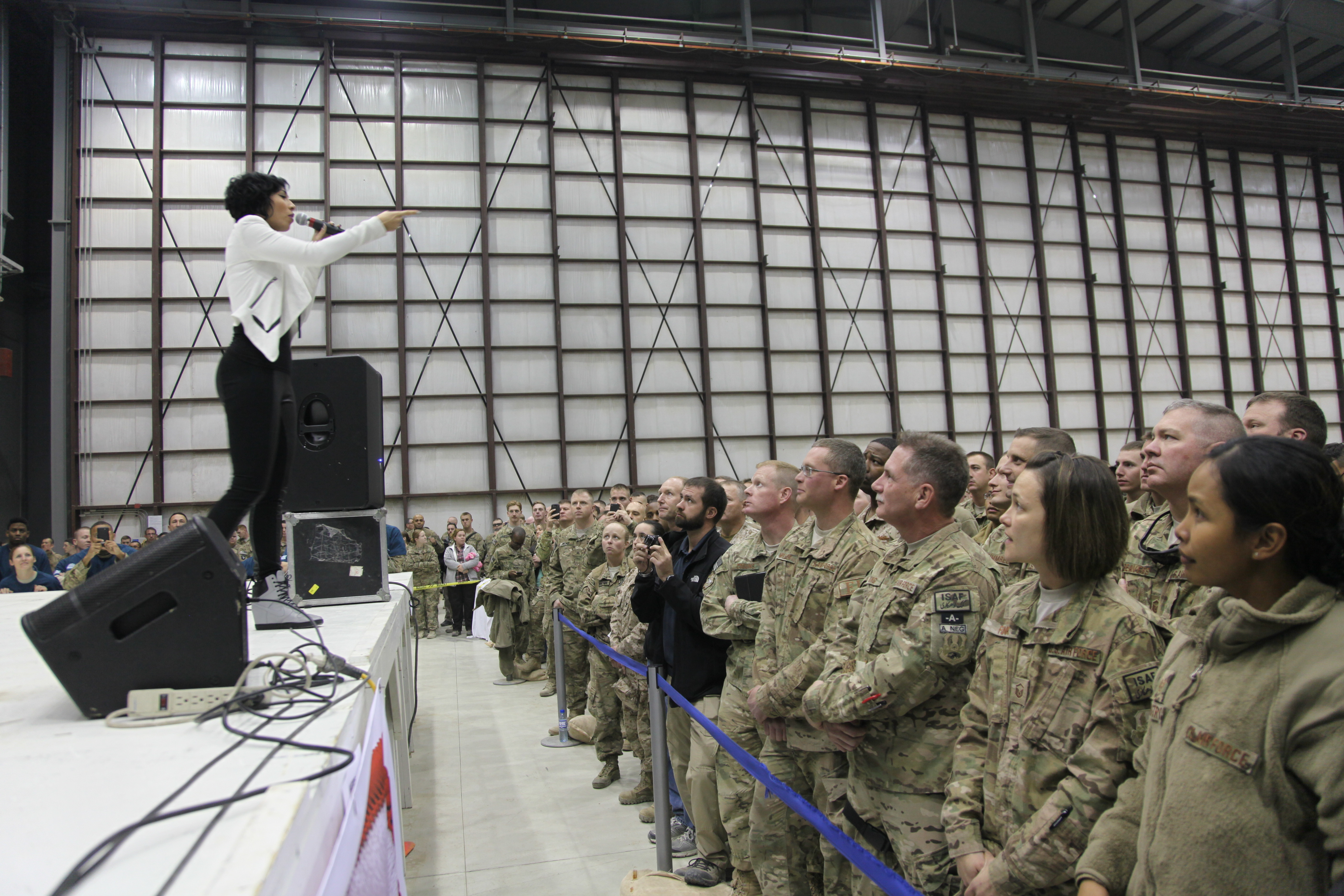
Kelly performing for U.S. Service members during the 2013 USO chairman's Holiday Tour at Bagram Airfield in Parwan province, Afghanistan, Dec 9, 2013

In early 2011, Kelly and her production team had approached Frank Ocean to write a song for her debut studio album. The song in question eventually became "Thinking Bout Forever", which Kelly commented; "it's sort of a vulnerable track and I wanted everyone to feel me on it." In July 2011, Roc Nation stated on the official site that Kelly is closing her album up and the first single would be the Frank Ocean-penned "Thinking Bout Forever". On July 28, 2011, Ocean leaked his demo version of the song onto his tumblr account, with the title reading "Thinking Bout You". The song was then promptly taken down by Ocean.

Kelly has worked with high-profile producers such as The-Dream, Ne-Yo, Jerry Wonda, James Fauntleroy II, Ryan Leslie, and Shea Taylor for her debut studio album. Prior to the album's release, Kelly released her first extended play (EP), titled Every Girl, on October 19, 2011. Kelly's version of "Thinkin Bout You" found its way onto the EP. Kelly was ultimately fine with Ocean's decision, however she noted that she didn't like how most people thought Ocean's version was the original, and how people assumed her version was a cover version. About the confusion of the track, Kelly stated: "Now that push has come to shove, we're going to let the song have a life of its own. I think it's an amazing, well-written record. Frank Ocean is incredibly talented, I will never say anything against that. But at the same time, you know, he's going to do what he wants to do, he's an artist as well."

In August 2012, her debut single "Special Delivery", was released to Urban radio stations. Her second single "Street Dreamin", features American rapper Kendrick Lamar and was released on May 21, 2013. Both songs were Top 40 hits on the Mediabase Urban Airplay charts. On November 26, 2013, Kelly announced she would be releasing her second EP and revealed her debut album was pushed back to a 2014 release. The EP includes six tracks as well as contributions from Jerry Wonda ("Goosebumps"), Pop Wansel, Sam Dew, Elijah Blake, and Cri$tyle. "I speak a lot about love and my feelings on these songs," said Bridget of the follow-up to her 2011 EP Every Girl. "I speak to those who have been in relationships, the good and the bad, and that in the midst of turmoil, finding something you can smile about." The EP, titled Cut to... Bridget Kelly, includes her debut single "Special Delivery" and was made available as a free download on December 17, via her official website.

=== 2014–present: Parting Ways with Roc Nation and All or Nothing ===
In June 2014, Kelly confirmed her split after six years with Roc Nation and she is about releasing her album independently. After the split, Kelly released two singles, "I Won't Cry" and "Almost More", which are the exclusive previews of her upcoming music. She is working with Jerry Wonda on the new album and changed the album title from Something Different to All or Nothing, which is set to release in 2017. She appeared on Love and Hip Hop: Hollywood from 2017 to 2018 as a supporting cast member for two seasons. In October 2020, Kelly began hosting the See, The Thing Is Podcast on the Joe Budden Network alongside cohosts Mandii B and Olivia Dope. The podcast now only stars Bridget Kelly and Mandii B after Olivia Dope claimed Joe Budden sexually harassed her during taping, forcing her to quit her position on the show.

== Discography ==
=== Studio albums ===
- All or Nothing (2017)
- Reality Bites (2018)

=== EPs ===
- Every Girl (2011)
- Cut to... Bridget Kelly (2013)
- Summer of 17 (2015)
- The Great Escape (2019)

=== Singles ===
==== As a lead artist ====
List of singles as featured artist, with selected chart positions, showing year released and album name
Title	Year	Peak chart positions			Album
Title	Year	US R&B	BEL (FL)	UK	Album
"Thinking About Forever"	2011	—	—	—	Every Girl
"Special Delivery"	2012	51	79	102	Cut to... Bridget Kelly
"Street Dreamin" (featuring Kendrick Lamar)	2013	89	—	—	All or Nothing
"Happy for Me"	2017	—	—	—	Reality Bites
"Swear to Gawd" (with Brooke Valentine)	2018	—	—	—	Reality Bites
"Lucky You"	2019	—	—	—	The Great Escape – EP
"Single Player Game"	2019	—	—	—	TBA
"—" denotes a recording that did not chart or was not released in that territory.

==== As featured artist ====
List of singles as featured artist, with selected chart positions, showing year released and album name
Title	Year	Peak chart positions		Album
Title	Year	UK	SCO	Album
"My Time" (K Koke featuring Bridget Kelly)	2013	52	—	I Ain't Perfect
"Let Somebody Love You" (2face Idibia featuring Bridget Kelly)	2014	—	—	The Ascension
"—" denotes single that did not chart or was not released.

=== Guest appearances ===
List of non-single guest appearances, with other performing artists, showing year released and album name
Title	Year	Other performer(s)	Album	Ref.
"Take the World"	2010	Tinchy Stryder	Third Strike	
"Gotta Get Mine"	2013	Ai	Moriagaro	
