= Never Leave You =

2009 single by Tinchy Stryder

Single by Tinchy Stryder featuring Amelle

from the album Catch 22
- B-side: "It's a Problem"
- Released: 2 August 2009
- Recorded: 2009
- Length: 3:32
- Label: Takeover Entertainment Limited; Universal Island Records
- Songwriter(s): Kwasi Danquah III; Taio Cruz (lyrics)
- Producer(s): Fraser T Smith

Tinchy Stryder singles chronology
"Number 1" (2009)	"Never Leave You" (2009)	"I Got Soul" (2009)

Amelle singles chronology
"Never Leave You" (2009)	"God Won't Save U Now" (2012)

Music video
- "Never Leave You" on YouTube

"Never Leave You" is a song by British rapper Tinchy Stryder, released as the fourth single from his second studio album, Catch 22 as a digital download on 2 August 2009 and then as a CD single on 3 August 2009. The song was written by Stryder with lyrics by Taio Cruz and features guest vocals by Amelle, a member of British girl group the Sugababes. It received airplay on radio stations in the UK including BBC 1Xtra. "Never Leave You" has also reached "The A-List" on the BBC Radio 1 playlist. The music video was released on Stryder's official website on 24 June 2009.

The song immediately rushed into the UK and Ireland charts, charting at No. 1 in the UK and No. 2 in Ireland. It knocked the song "I Gotta Feeling" by American group the Black Eyed Peas off the UK top spot on 2 August 2009, but failed to knock "I Gotta Feeling" off the Irish top spot, and charted behind it.

== Background ==
The song was originally picked to be Stryder's first single from his album Catch 22, but "Number 1" was chosen instead. The song was Amelle's first solo release outside of the Sugababes. It became Stryder's second number one single from Catch 22. It also became Amelle's first number one single as a solo artist making her, to date, the only member of the Sugababes to achieve a number one single outside of the group.

== Writing and inspiration ==
On the surface, "Never Leave You" is about Stryder telling a girl how he's going to be with her forever, but beneath the surface its sentiments are directed towards his original fans, his East London roots, to grime music and to memories of growing up in his neighbourhood. According to the producer Fraser T Smith, "it's a song about success and staying true to yourself."

== Critical reception ==
"Never Leave You" received positive reviews from music critics. David Balls from Digital Spy said: "Rewind eight months and the name Tinchy Stryder would have been met with blank expressions by all but a core of grime fanatics in East London. Now, having bypassed the critics and trend-setters, the rapper has become one of the year's biggest success stories thanks to a winning combination of pop hooks and hip-hop rhymes. Building on the momentum of his recent chart-topper 'Number One', Stryder's back with summer smash-in-waiting 'Never Leave You'."

"It finds him sticking to the Europoppy sound of his previous singles, but this time he's drafted in his starriest sparring partner yet - Sugababes singer Amelle Berrabah. He powers through the verses in his distinctive London twang, she croons the glorious chorus, and Fraser T Smith keeps the production as fresh and sharp as a grapefuit breakfast. Stryder may have started the year as the so-called "Prince of Grime", but... wait for it... he's fast establishing himself as the King of the Charts", and he gave the song four out of five stars.

== Promotion ==
Stryder and Amelle performed the song together for the first time at BBC Sound. The pair performed the song together at T4 on the Beach in July 2009, and at Party in the Park. In August 2009, the pair were still promoting the song, still singing it on shows like TMF Sessions and Live Lounge. The song was also performed together at 95.8 Capital FM. After promoting the song, the song shot to number one in the UK. Amelle toured with Stryder on his promotional tour.

== Music video ==
=== Background ===
Sugababes member Amelle Berrabah in the music video for Tinchy Stryder's "Never Leave You".

The music video for the track was directed by Emil Nava, with producer Claire Oxley and executive producer Ben Pugh and Rory Aitkin. The art director of the video was Chris Lightburn-Jones and the stylist Chloe Richardson and Alison Elwin. The editor was in fact Nick Allix at The White House and the colourist was Tareq & James at Prime Focus. Emil Nava stated that the music video would be very bright and relaxed.

=== Synopsis ===
The music video for Never Leave You features Stryder in his Star in the Hood clothing, in a room, sitting on a chair, with bright lights shining around him. As the scenes move on, Berrabah and Stryder are seen singing together in a white-coloured room, they are also seen in the same room as one another but a wall separating them so they can not see each other. But as it goes on they are seen in X-ray vision. Throughout the music video, both Stryder and Berrabah are seen wearing a number of different clothing. Stryder wears three different pairs of jeans, with various shirts, jackets and chains, whilst Berrabah wears two different dresses, and a black catsuit with cutouts. The pair dance and sing on the spot and back to back, whilst leaning, sitting and lying on metal-like chairs. The majority of the video is filmed using green screen technology.

== Track listing ==
CD single / digital download
No.	Title	Length
1.	"Never Leave You" (Single Version)	3:32
2.	"Never Leave You" (Digital Dog Radio Edit)	2:24
3.	"Never Leave You" (Remix feat. Bashy & Double S)	3:33
4.	"It's a Problem" (non-album track)	3:42
Total length:		13:11

== Charts ==
=== Weekly charts ===
Chart (2009)	Peak position
Europe (European Hot 100 Singles)	5
Ireland (IRMA)	2
UK Singles (OCC)	1

=== Year-end charts ===
Chart (2009)	Position
UK Singles (OCC)	51

== Certifications ==
Region	Certification	Certified units/sales
United Kingdom (BPI)	Gold	400,000^{‡}
^{‡} Sales+streaming figures based on certification alone.

== Release history ==
Date	Format	Label
2 August 2009	Digital download	Takeover Entertainment, Universal Island Records
3 August 2009	CD single	Takeover Entertainment, Universal Island Records

== See also ==
- List of number-one singles from the 2000s (UK)
- List of number-one R&B hits of 2009 (UK)
