= Catch 22 (Tinchy Stryder album) =

Studio album by Tinchy Stryder
- Released: 17 August 2009
- Recorded: 2008–09
- Genre: Hip-hop; grime; pop rap
- Length: 58:02
- Label: Takeover; Universal Island
- Producer: Fraser T. Smith

Tinchy Stryder chronology
Star in the Hood EP Vol. 2 (2009)	Catch 22 (2009)	Street Anthems (2009)

Singles from Catch 22
- 1. "Stryderman" Released: 20 July 2008; 2. "Take Me Back" Released: 19 January 2009; 3. "Number 1" Released: 20 April 2009; 4. "Never Leave You" Released: 2 August 2009; 5. "You're Not Alone" Released: 26 October 2009

Catch 22 is the second full-length solo studio album by recording artist Tinchy Stryder. After three successful singles leading up to the album, the album was then released on 17 August 2009. The album is produced and co-written by award-winning producer and songwriter Fraser T Smith, whose previous credits include James Morrison, Craig David and Kano.

The album was preceded by a collaborative album with grime producer Maniac and a two-part free downloadable extended plays (EP), Star in the Hood EP Vol. 1 & Star in the Hood EP Vol. 2. Tinchy Stryder toured his album, Catch 22, in October 2009, and again in February/March 2010.

== Critical reception ==
Professional ratings
Review scores
Source	Rating
AllMusic	3/5 stars
Digital Spy	4/5 stars
The Guardian	4/5 stars
The Independent	2/5 stars
RapReviews	5/10 stars
State	4/5 stars
The Times	3/5 stars
Virgin Media	3.5/5 stars

The Mirror gave the album a positive review: "...keen learner with an eye on the crossover market, Stryder shows infectious energy and determination to cover his core market on this second album. Check the auto-tuned pop thrills of Take Me Back and Shake Me. Stryder cuts an impressive sway as the hardworking pupil of the Grime Crossover Contingent." The Telegraph gave the album 3/5 stars and said: "American rappers have their guns. Tinchy Stryder has his mum. The witty domesticity of Stryder’s raps are part of the charm of this decidedly British hip hop album. Coming from the grime world, but not in the least grimy, the hook laden, techno-pop tracks are so relentlessly catchy, his unpretentious, snotty-nosed lyricism is like aural icing on a sugary pop cake."The Times gave the album 3/5 stars and said: "With a second No 1 single under his belt, Kwasi Danquah III, 22, is being hailed by wishful thinkers as the second coming of grime. Catch 22 is an uneasy balancing act between these two Stryder sides; but it makes for compelling spectacle."The Independent however was much less favourable of the album giving it 2/5 stars: "Tinchy Stryder may be the second-biggest name in grime, but Catch 22 suggests he's more in the mould of Akon than Dizzee Rascal: there's little of Dizzee's bonkers charm about these tracks, and plenty of Akon's reliance on auto-tuned hooks and romantic themes. Indeed, when not reflecting on his success, Tinchy's time seems mostly taken up with oiling his way into girls' affections, trying to extricate himself from their clinging attentions, or apologising for mistreating them."

== Commercial performance ==
At the beginning of the week commencing 17 August 2009 Catch 22 was duelling with Calvin Harris's Ready for the Weekend for the top spot in the UK, with only 1,000 copies between them. By the last mid-week update there was only a few copies between them. Catch 22 reached No. 2 in the UK by the end of the week, with Harris outselling Stryder by 8000 copies. Tinchy Stryder used his official Twitter to convey his gratitude to his fans for the high charting of the album. In its second week the album fell to No. 5 in the UK and was certified Gold in the UK.

In Ireland, the album debuted and peaked at No. 9.

== Singles ==
- The first single "Stryderman", was released as a digital download on 20 July 2008 with the CD single released on 8 August 2008. The song was added to BBC Radio 1's C Playlist in July 2008 and debuted on the UK Singles Chart at number 73; Stryder's first single to chart in the UK.
- The second single "Take Me Back", which also featured fellow Universal Island Records-signed act Taio Cruz was released on 19 January 2009. The single received high amount of praise and received placement on Radio 1's A Playlist. The single eventually peaked at number 3 in the UK; marking Stryder's first Top 10 single in the UK.
- The third single "Number 1" which featured UK trio N-Dubz became Stryder's second Top 10 single and first number-one single in the UK when it debuted at the top spot on the UK Singles Chart on 27 April 2009.
- The fourth single "Never Leave You" featured vocals from Amelle Berrabah of the Sugababes and was released on 9 August 2009; where it peaked at number-one in the UK, Stryder's third consecutive Top 10 single on the UK Singles Chart.
- The fifth and final single "You're Not Alone" was released on 26 October 2009, where it reached number 14 in the UK; marking the fourth UK Top 15 hit from Stryder.

== Track listing ==
Standard edition
No.	Title	Writer(s)	Producer(s)	Length
1.	"Take Off"	Kwasi Danquah III	Tinchy Stryder	1:47
2.	"I'm Landing"	Danquah; Tom Barnes; Ben Kohn; Peter Kelleher; Gavin Jones	TMS	3:38
3.	"Take Me Back" (featuring Taio Cruz)	Danquah; Fraser T Smith; Taio Cruz	Smith	3:35
4.	"Spotlight" (featuring Tanya Lacey)	Danquah; Tanya Lacey; Smith; Ingo Martens; Stevo Wilcken	Smith	3:37
5.	"Number 1" (featuring Dappy of N-Dubz)	Danquah; Smith; Dino Contostavlos	Smith	3:33
6.	"Shake Me"	Danquah; Prince Owusu-Agyekum	Prince Rapid	3:40
7.	"Stryderman"	Danquah; Smith; Kane Robinson	Smith	4:08
8.	"Warning"	Danquah; Timothy McKenzie	Labrinth	3:18
9.	"First Place"	Danquah; Vincent Frank Turner	Frankmusik	2:48
10.	"Pit Stop"	Danquah	Stryder	1:47
11.	"Halo"	Danquah; Smith	Smith	3:42
12.	"Tryna Be Me" (featuring Ruff Sqwad)	Danquah; Owusu-Agyekum; David Nkrumah; C. Ikenga; E. Ayerh	Prince Rapid; Dirty Danger	3:26
13.	"Never Leave You" (featuring Amelle Berrabah)	Danquah; Smith; Cruz	Smith	3:31
14.	"We Got Dem" (featuring Chipmunk)	Danquah; Jahmaal Fyffe; Nkrumah	Dirty Danger	3:02
15.	"You're Not Alone"	Danquah; Smith; Robin Taylor-Firth; Tim Kellett	Smith	3:50
16.	"Preview"	Danquah; Smith	Smith	3:53
17.	"Catch 22"	Danquah	Stryder	1:50
18.	"Express Urself"	Danquah; Will Kennard; Saul Milton; Charles Wright	Chase & Status	2:57
Total length:				58:02

iTunes bonus track
No.	Title	Writer(s)	Producer(s)	Length
19.	"On My Own" (Blame featuring Ruff Sqwad)	Conrad Shafie; Danquah; Fuda Guy; Alex Mills	Blame	3:47
Total length:				61:49

Deluxe edition bonus tracks
No.	Title	Writer(s)	Producer(s)	Length
1.	"Stryderman Remix" (featuring Wiley)	Richard Cowie	Smith	4:09
2.	"Take Me Back Remix" (featuring Sway and Chipmunk)	Derek Safo; Jahmaal Fyffe	Smith	4:14
3.	"Never Leave You Remix" (featuring Bashy and Double S)	Ashley Thomas	Smith	3:30
4.	"Rollin" (featuring Roachee)	Danquah; Brandon Jolie; Roachee; Delusion	Maniac	3:29
5.	"Stuck on My Mind"	Danquah	Prince Rapid	3:44
6.	"It's a Problem"	Danquah	Prince Rapid	2:43
7.	"Story Unfold"	Danquah	Toddla T	3:27
8.	"B.O.Y.Z"	Danquah	Dirty Danger	4:09

Notes

- "Spotlight" samples elements of "Dooms Night" by Azzido Da Bass.
- "You're Not Alone" contains an interpolation of "You're Not Alone" by Olive.
- "Express Urself" contains an interpolation of "Express Yourself" by Charles Wright & the Watts 103rd Street Rhythm Band.

== Charts ==
=== Weekly charts ===
Weekly chart performance for Catch 22
Chart (2009)	Peak position
European Top 100 Albums	11
Irish Albums (IRMA)	9
Scottish Albums (OCC)	5
UK Albums (OCC)	2

=== Year-end charts ===
Year-end chart performance for Catch 22
Chart (2009)	Position
UK Albums (OCC)	104

=== Certifications ===
Certifications for Catch 22
Country	Provider	Certification
United Kingdom	BPI	Gold

== Release history ==
Release history and formats for Catch 22
Country	Date	Format	Label
Various	17 August 2009	CD, digital download	Takeover Entertainment, Universal Island
