= Game Over (Tinchy Stryder song) =

2010 single by Tinchy Stryder and others

Promotional single by Tinchy Stryder featuring Giggs, Professor Green, Tinie Tempah, Devlin, Example and Chipmunk

from the album Third Strike
- Released: 15 November 2010
- Recorded: 2010
- Genre: Grime
- Length: 5:20
- Label: Takeover Entertainment Limited
- Songwriters: Kwasi Danquah III; Elliot Gleave; James Devlin; Jahmaal Fyffe; Nathaniel Thompson; Stephen Manderson; Patrick Okogwu Jr.; Eshraque Mughal
- Producer: iSHi

Tinchy Stryder singles chronology
"Second Chance" (2010)	"Game Over" (2010)	"Let It Rain" (2011)

Example singles chronology
"Two Lives" (2010)	"Game Over" (2010)	"Unorthodox" (2011)

Giggs singles chronology
"Hustle On" (2010)	"Game Over" (2010)	"Bus Commercial" (2011)

Professor Green singles chronology
"Monster" (2010)	"Game Over" (2010)	"Jungle" (2010)

Devlin singles chronology
"Runaway" (2010)	"Game Over" (2010)	"Let It Go" (2011)

Chipmunk singles chronology
"Flying High" (2010)	"Game Over" (2010)	"Champion" (2011)

Tinie Tempah singles chronology
"Miami 2 Ibiza" (2010)	"Game Over" (2010)	"Invincible" (2010)

Music video
- "Game Over" on YouTube

"Game Over" is a song by Tinchy Stryder, released as a promotional single from his third studio album Third Strike. The song features vocals from Example, Giggs, Devlin, Chipmunk, Professor Green and Tinie Tempah, who each have their own verse. It was released on 15 November 2010 via digital download. An official remix featuring Ghetts, Slix, Griminal, Dot Rotten, Fuda Guy, Wretch 32, Roachee, Maxsta & Tinchy Stryder, can be found with a video on YouTube.

== Background ==
The song "Game Over" was composed by Tinchy Stryder and was written by the artists in the song, Example, Giggs, Professor Green, Devlin, Chipmunk and Tinie Tempah. In the behind-the-scenes of the video, it explains how some of the artists got involved with Tinchy Stryder and "Game Over". Professor Green said he was on the Eurostar, and Sam Wrench of Universal Island Records messaged him and asked him to do a verse on "Game Over". At first, Green was unsure of doing it because he was ill and busy. Then twenty minutes later, Green sent back Wrench his verse with BlackBerry Messenger. The song is produced by Eshraque "iSHi" Mughal, credited as "Ishi 2Stripes" (known for producing tracks on Tinie Tempah's album, Disc-Overy). Stryder told AOL Music how the song came about: "My producer played me this beat and straight away I knew it would make a great freestyle track. So I got together everyone that I like right now: Devlin, Professor Green, Giggs... Everyone wrote their bits individually – Pro Green wrote his verse sat on a train somewhere – then we all got together for the video shoot. It was a cool vibe - no egos clashing. We didn't party or anything, we just got the recording done." Example's verse combines elements of his 2009 song "Pirate FM" with new lyrics written for the song. "Pirate FM" lyrics were also recycled into "From Space" and "Skies Don't Lie".

== Live performances ==
The song was performed live at BBC Radio 1Xtra Live and at the MOBO Awards 2010. The song was also performed live at T4 Stars of 2010 with a verse from Skepta instead of Chipmunk and Skepta uses his first verse from his single Rescue Me.

== Music video ==
The official video for the song was released on 1 November 2010 and uploaded to YouTube. It was directed by Adam Powell. It focuses on each of the artists as their verse starts in a grey set.

== Chart performance ==
"Game Over" charted at number 22 in the UK Singles Chart on 21 November 2010. The song stayed in the Top 40 for four weeks (its last position in the Top 40 was number 38), then dropped to number 51 on 19 December 2010. It spent 3 more weeks than his last single "Second Chance" which only had one week in the Top 40, debuting at number 22, then dropped to number 41 the week after. "Game Over" charted purely due to the music video airing on British music channels and wasn't released as a physical and/or a digital single. It could be bought only from the album (released digitally on 15 November).

Chart (2010)	Peak position
Scotland Singles (OCC)	28
UK Dance (OCC)	2
UK Singles (OCC)	22
UK Singles Downloads (OCC)	22

== Certifications ==
Region	Certification	Certified units/sales
United Kingdom (BPI)	Silver	200,000^{‡}
^{‡} Sales+streaming figures based on certification alone.

== Release history ==
Region	Date	Format	Label
United Kingdom	15 November 2010	Digital download	Takeover Entertainment Limited
