= Melanie Fiona discography =

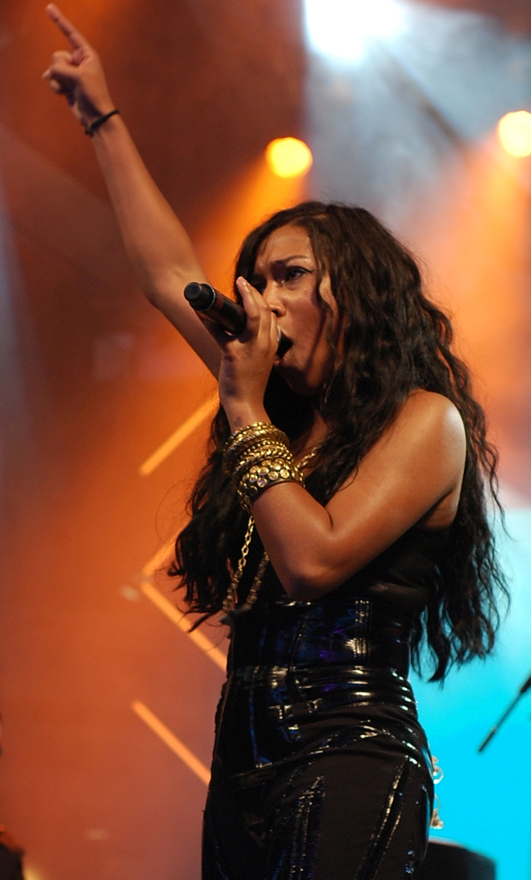
- Fiona performing in 2010
- Studio albums: 2
- Singles: 12
- Featured artist: 4

The discography of Canadian R&B recording artist Melanie Fiona comprises two studio album and 12 singles.

Fiona's debut album The Bridge was released in 2009; she collaborated with Future Cut, Vada Nobles, Stereotypes, J. Phoenix and Peter Wade Keusch. The debut single "Give It to Me Right" was sent to radio stations on February 28, 2009, and peaked at number 20 on the Canadian Hot 100 chart and number 41 on the UK Singles Chart. The second single, "It Kills Me", became her breakout song on the Billboard Hot 100, where it entered the Top 50, along with topping the Hot R&B/Hip-Hop Songs chart. The song earned Fiona a Grammy Award nomination for Best Female R&B Vocal Performance. The Bridge also earned her an NAACP Image Award nomination for Outstanding New Artist. In 2012, Fiona won two Grammy Awards for Best Traditional R&B Performance for the song "Fool for You" with CeeLo Green.

In 2011, Fiona began recording her second studio album. The lead single was entitled "Gone and Never Coming Back". The single peaked at 37 on the US R&B chart, becoming her second highest-peaking song on the R&B chart so far. Later that year, Fiona released her second single, "4 AM"; it was sent to urban stations on August 30, 2011. "4 AM" peaked on the US R&B chart at No. 8; the song was about a lover who had gone out and was cheating on her. She released her second studio album The MF Life on March 20, 2012.

== Albums ==
=== Studio albums ===
Title	Album details	Peak chart positions						Sales	Certifications
Title	Album details	CAN	US	US R&B	GER	SWI	UK	Sales	Certifications
The Bridge	Release date: June 26, 2009; Label: Title 9, SRC, Universal Motown; Formats: CD, Digital Download	25	27	4	35	3	98	US: 450,000	SWI: Gold
The MF Life	Release date: March 20, 2012; Label: Title 9, SRC, Universal Republic; Formats: CD, Digital download	64	7	1	—	23	32	US: 200,000	

=== Extended plays ===
Title	Details
Say Yes	Released: April 4, 2025; Label: LoveLinc Music; Format: Digital download

== Singles ==
=== As lead artist ===
List of singles, with selected chart positions
Title	Year	Peak chart positions									Certifications	Album
Title	Year	CAN	AUT	GER	ITA	SWE	SWI	US	US R&B	UK	Certifications	Album
"Somebody Come Get Me" (as Melanie Hall aka Syren)	2008	—	—	—	—	—	—	—	58	—		Reggae Gold 2008
"Give It to Me Right"	2009	20	54	31	9	—	5	—	57	41	SWI: Gold	The Bridge
"It Kills Me"	2009	39	—	—	—	—	—	43	1	—	RIAA: Platinum	The Bridge
"Bang Bang"	2009	—	—	—	—	—	—	—	—	—		The Bridge
"Monday Morning"	2009	—	3	46	—	11	1	—	—	—	SWI: Platinum	The Bridge
"Ay Yo"	2010	—	—	—	—	—	62	—	71	—		The Bridge
"Priceless"	2010	—	—	—	—	—	—	—	94	—		The Bridge
"Gone and Never Coming Back"	2011	—	—	—	—	—	—	—	37	—		The MF Life
"4 AM"	2011	—	—	—	—	—	—	81	8	—	RIAA: Gold	The MF Life
"This Time" (featuring J. Cole)	2012	—	—	—	—	—	—	—	89	—		The MF Life
"Wrong Side of a Love Song"	2012	—	—	—	—	—	—	—	87	—		The MF Life
"Cold Piece"	2013	—	—	—	—	—	—	—	—	—		Non-album singles
"Bite the Bullet"	2015	—	—	—	—	—	—	—	—	—		Non-album singles
"I Tried"	2015	—	—	—	—	—	—	—	—	—		Non-album singles
"Remember U"	2017	—	—	—	—	—	—	—	—	—		Non-album singles
"Say Yes"	2024	—	—	—	—	—	—	—	—	—		Say Yes
"I Choose You"	2024	—	—	—	—	—	—	—	—	—		Say Yes
"Mona Lisa Smile"	2025	—	—	—	—	—	—	—	—	—		Say Yes
"—" denotes a title that did not chart, or was not released in that territory.

=== Promotional singles ===
Title	Year	Album
"Sad Songs" (Note: Song was released in the UK only as a digital EP before the release of "Give It To Me Right". The three-song EP also contained the reggae-tinged songs "Somebody Come Get Me" and "Island Boy", both produced by Supa Dups.)	2009	The Bridge
"La Vie En Rose (Martini Rosato)" (Note: Recorded specially for a Martini commercial.)	2009	Non-album promotional singles
"The Christmas Song"	2018	Non-album promotional singles
"Don't Explain"	2022	Non-album promotional singles

=== As featured artist ===
Year	Song	Peak chart positions									Album
Year	Song	CAN	AUT	GER	ITA	SWE	SWI	US	US R&B	UK	Album
2010	"Wake Up Everybody" (The Roots & John Legend feat. Melanie Fiona)	—	—	—	—	—	—	—	—	—	Wake Up!
2011	"Let It Rain" (Tinchy Stryder feat. Melanie Fiona)	—	—	—	—	—	—	—	—	14	Third Strike
2011	"Fool for You" (Cee Lo Green feat. Melanie Fiona)	—	—	—	—	—	—	102	13	—	The Lady Killer
2015	"Natural" (Brady Watt feat. Melanie Fiona)	—	—	—	—	—	—	—	—	—	Lifetronics
"—" denotes a title that did not chart, or was not released in that territory.

== Guest appearances ==
List of songs with guest appearances by Melanie Fiona
Title	Year	Other artist(s)	Album
"No Games"	2009	Serani	—N/a
"Past Present Future"	2009	KRS-One, Buckshot, Naledge	Survival Skills
"Nuvole Rosa"	2009	Giuliano Palma	Combo
"Beautiful Bliss"	2009	Wale, J. Cole	Attention Deficit
"Elle parle le turututu"	2010	Stress	Des rois, des pions et des fous: Evolution
"Here Than Gone"	2010	Young Sid	What Doesn't Kill Me...
"All We Need"	2010	JRDN	IAMJRDN
"No Cigarette Smoke (In My Room)"	2011	Stephen Marley	Revelation Pt. 1 – The Root of Life
"Love Is Love"	2011	The Kid Daytona	The Interlude II
"Turn You On"	2012	Cris Cab, Shaggy	Echo Boom
"If I Fall"	2012	Big K.R.I.T.	Live from the Underground
"Ready Set Go"	2013	Talib Kweli	Prisoner of Conscious
"Ain't Nothing Like The Real Thing"	2013	Michael Bolton	Ain't No Mountain High Enough: A Tribute to Hitsville U.S.A.
"The Wind Cries Mary"	2013	Fabrizio Sotti	Right Now
"One More Time"	2013	Gyptian	Sex, Love & Reggae
"All My Love"	2013	Glenn Lewis	Moment of Truth
"Soundboy Kill It"	2015	Raekwon, Assassin	Fly International Luxurious Art
"Send Me a Sign"	2015	Black Violin, Black Thought	Stereotypes
"LArain"	2016	Jesse Boykins III, Trinidad James	Bartholomew

== Music videos ==
=== As lead artist ===
List of music videos, showing year released and director
Title	Year	Director(s)
"Give It to Me Right"	2009	Anthony Mandler
"It Kills Me"	2009	Armen Djerrahian
"Bang Bang"	2009	Phil Griffin
"Monday Morning"	2009	
"Ay Yo"	2010	Armen Djerrahian
"You Stop My Heart (Valentines Day Version)"	2010	
"Gone and Never Coming Back"	2011	Colin Tilley
"4 AM"	2011	Colin Tilley
"Watch Me Work"	2012	
"This Time"	2012	Colin Tilley
"Change the Record" (featuring B.o.B)	2012	Rome and Vinit Borrison

=== As featured artist ===
List of music videos, showing year released and director
Title	Year	Director(s)
"Nuvole Rosa"	2010	Giuliano Palma
"Wake Up Everybody"	2010	Gil Green
"Let It Rain"	2011	
