= X-Quisite =

Canadian R&B girl group

- Origin: Toronto, Ontario, Canada
- Genre: R&B
- Years active: 2002–2005
- Label: Linus Entertainment
- Past members: Nicole Holness; Melanie Fiona Hallim; Andreena Mill; Nirvana Savoury; Terri Oliver

X-Quisite was a Canadian R&B girl group, originally consisting of Nicole Holness, Melanie Fiona Hallim, and Andreena Mill. Soon after being established in 2002, the trio were signed to Linus Entertainment (then distributed by Warner Music Canada), through which they released their self-titled debut (and sole studio album) X-Quisite in 2003. Later in 2003, Hallim and Mill were replaced by Terri Oliver & Nirvana Savoury. The group had a number of successful singles from their debut album, most notably "Bad Girl", "No Regrets" and "Sassy Thang". In 2004, the album earned the group a Juno Award nomination for "R&B/Soul Recording of the Year". The group disbanded in 2005, with all members moving on to pursue solo careers.

== After break-up ==
=== Nicole Holness ===
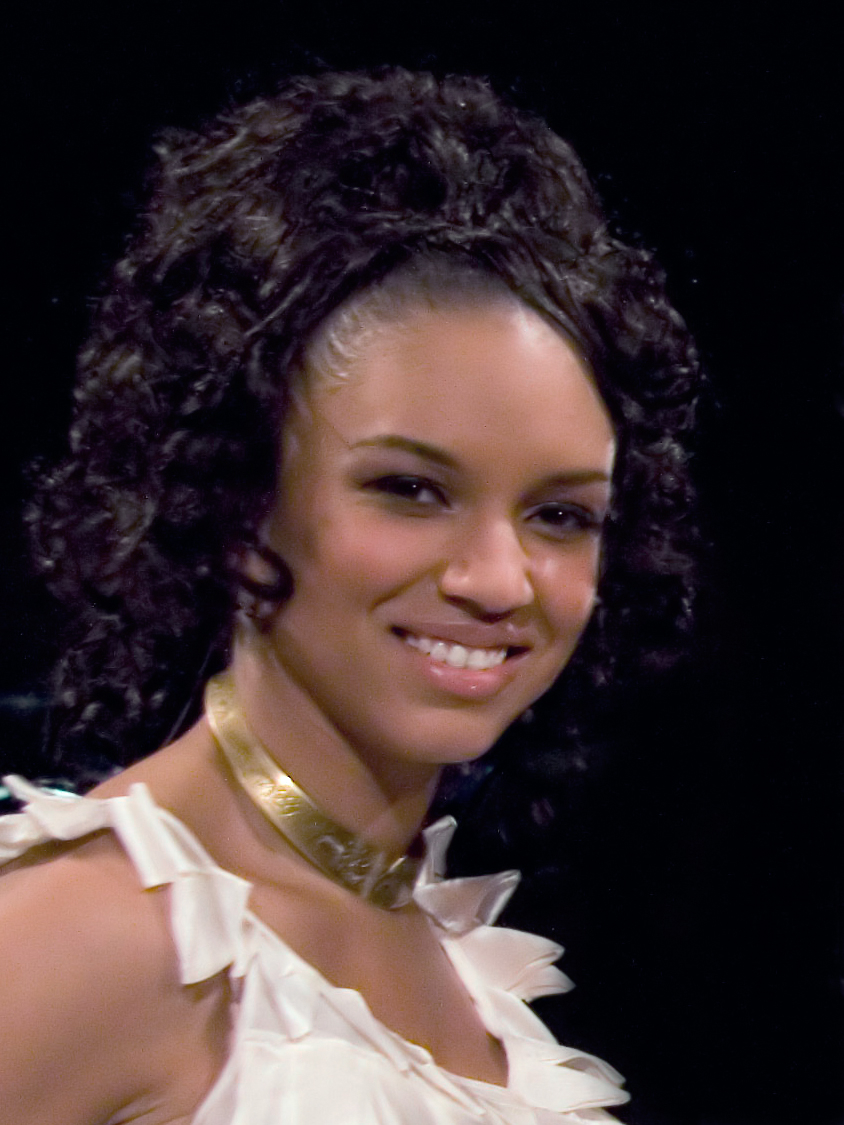
Nicole Holness in MTV Live (2008)

Nicole Holness (born April 13, 1984, in Toronto, Ontario) became a television host as one of the original seven co-hosts of MTV Canada and their flagship series MTV Live. On March 1, 2011, she released her debut solo album Unreleased. The album was preceded by her debut single, "Epic" (May 5, 2009) and "Pop Yo Bottles" (June 29, 2010). She has also been a model in several Canadian national print advertisement campaigns.

=== Melanie Fiona Hallim ===
Melanie Fiona Hallim (born July 4, 1983, in Toronto, Ontario) with Guyanese immigrant parents, of mixed African, Indian, and Portuguese descent. followed a very lucrative musical career. After a brief period in another group called The Renaissance with rapper Drake, and recorded a reggae song "Somebody Come Get Me" under the stage name Syren Hall. The song was included in the Reggae Gold 2008 compilation album.

She went solo with her debut album The Bridge released in 2009, having collaborated with Future Cut, Vada Nobles, Stereotypes, J. Phoenix and Peter Wade Keusch. The debut single "Give It to Me Right" (February 28, 2009) was a hit on Canadian Hot 100 chart and reached number 41 on the UK Singles Chart. The second single, "It Kills Me", became her breakout song on the Billboard Hot 100 where it entered the Top 50, along with topping the Hot R&B/Hip-Hop Songs chart. The song earned her a Grammy Award nomination for Best Female R&B Vocal Performance. The song "Monday Morning" is her biggest hit in Europe to date. The Bridge also earned her an NAACP Image Award nomination for Outstanding New Artist. In 2012, Hallim won two Grammy Awards for Best Traditional R&B Performance and Best R&B Song for the song "Fool for You" with Cee Lo Green. In 2011, Hallim began recording her second studio album The MF Life. She has co-written songs for recording artists Rihanna and Kardinal Offishall, working with, amongst others, super producer Mike City.

=== Andreena Mill ===
Mill has released several solo singles, and has worked as a backing or guest vocalist for R&B and hip hop artists, including Drake, DMX, Saukrates, Tre Mission, Aaron A, Jazzfeezy, Tone Mason, and Kardinal Offishall. Andreena Mill is a singer who has collaborated with Drake. Her father, also a musician and recording artist, realized her musical potential at age 3 and enrolled her in piano lessons the next year. By the age of 11, Andreena began recording and writing her own material.

=== Nirvana Savoury ===
Nirvana Savoury quit music for a while after her brother died in 2008. He had been suffering for many years of Ataxia telangiectasia. She also came out some time later as a lesbian. She has made a comeback in the 2010s, with release of a single "Lipstick Lover" in 2011 in addition to a dance mixtape version with Jester and Kid Kut from Toronto. The mixtape also contains three original tracks, "Ambulance", "Flavors", and "Throb". Savoury also appeared in Karl Wolf's 2012 album Finally Free with the track "Tell Me" featuring Nirvana Savoury. She was working on a solo album for release in 2013.

== Discography ==
=== Albums ===
- 2003: X-Quisite

Track list

1. "Colors" (1:00)
2. "Sassy Thang" (4:10)
3. "Bad Girl" (3:36)
4. "Don't Say" (2:58)
5. "No Regrets" (3:22)
6. "How We Swing" (featuring Skitz) (3:31)
7. "Best Friends" (featuring Zoë) (3:47)
8. "Who's the Man" (3:32)
9. "Showing Love" (4:20)
10. "Why You Do" (3:42)
11. "Ex-Girlfriend" (3:13)
12. "Foolio" (1:13)
13. "Through the Week" (5:21)
14. "Bad Girl" (remix featuring Bigz)
15. "No Regrets" (dance remix) (4:30)
16. "Don't Say" (slow jam Remix (2:57)
17. "No Regrets" (remix featuring Ish) (3:26)

=== Singles ===
- "No Regrets" (2002)
- ”Bad Girl” (2003)
- "Sassy Thang" (2004)
