= List of SRC artists =

This is a list of artists that are currently or formerly signed to SRC Records. The label is home to many acts. An asterisk (*) denotes an artist who no longer records for the label.

== A ==
- Akon (Konvict/SRC)
- American Yard (Konvict Ent)
- Asher Roth(SchoolBoy)
- Aubrey O'Day

== B ==
- David Banner
- Baby Bash(*)
- The Beatnuts(*)

== C ==
- Cam'Ron
- Camp Lo

== D ==
- David Banner
- Def Squad (Def Squad/SRC)
- DirtyRap (Loud/SRC)

== L ==
- La The Darkman (Aphilliates Music Group/Embassy Entertainment/SRC)

== M ==
- Marky
- Jae Millz (Wanna Blow/SRC)(*) (Former Artist- now with Young Money)
- Melanie Fiona (Title9/SRC)

== P ==
- Pharoahe Monch

== R ==
- Remy Ma(*)
- Ray J

== S ==
- Shontelle (SRC)
- Keith Sweat

== T ==
- Tami Chynn
- T-Boz (Rowdy/SRC/FYI/Cash Money/Universal Motown)
- Terror Squad (Terror Squad/SRC)(*)

== W ==
- Wu-Tang Clan (Loud/SRC)

== See also ==
- Loud Records
- SRC Records
