= MTV News =

News division of MTV

MTV News was the news production division of MTV. The service was available in the US with localized versions on MTV's global network and an online news team. In 2016, MTV refreshed the MTV News brand to compete with the likes of BuzzFeed and Vice, but by mid-2017 MTV News was significantly downsized due to cutbacks.

MTV News content was available from respective MTV websites, Apps, YouTube and on-air.

In November 2018, MTV News began producing daily updates on Twitter titled MTV News: You Need to Know. Later titled MTV News Need to Know, the show evolved to a digital series that covered trending topics from pop culture to social justice issues to electoral politics and beyond.

On May 9, 2023, it was announced that the division would close. The associated website shut down on June 24, 2024.

== History ==
MTV News began in 1987 with the program The Week in Rock, hosted by long time Rolling Stone writer/music critic Kurt Loder, the first official MTV News correspondent. Beginning in 1990, the opening riff to Megadeth's "Peace Sells" was the main opening theme for The Week in Rock.

It first began covering political news in the 1992 American presidential elections, through its "Choose or Lose" campaign. MTV continued to run "Choose or Lose" for other presidential elections in the United States. For the 2008 election, Barack Obama and Hillary Clinton appeared on an MTV special to discuss the Iraq war.

Throughout the 2000s, MTV News began publishing digital editorial content via their website, Twitter feed, YouTube channel and Facebook page, offering information about MTV programming and music/pop-culture news aggregation. In November 2015, MTV introduced a new direction for its news department and hired Dan Fierman, former editorial director of Grantland, as MTV's editorial director and announced it would produce long-form journalism, think pieces and diversify its staff. However, in June 2017, MTV decided to restructure its news division with a greater focus on video, laying off much of their editorial staff. Later years saw a dramatic decrease in content produced by the outlet for its website or other avenues.

The division faced downsizing in the late 2000s and throughout the 2010s, and was shut down in May 2023. In June 2024, Variety reported that "more than two decades' worth of content published on MTVNews.com is no longer available after MTV appears to have fully pulled down the site and its related content". In response to the archives being removed, Michael Alex, the founding editor of MTV News' digital organization from 1994 until 2007, stated:

But if history has taught us one thing, it's that archives are valuable – for decades, recording studios threw away priceless master tapes left behind by everyone from the Rolling Stones to James Brown… until they started appearing on bootlegs and the artists and labels began spending thousands to get them back. In their way, the archives of MTV News and countless other news and entertainment organizations have a similar value: They're a living record of entertainment history as it happened. [...] History needs stewards, not owners. Whoever legally owns the archive does not legally own the history, even if they own the creative work of thousands of writers, editors, producers and more. This archive – of MTV News, where you heard it first – needs to be available to public.

A Paramount spokesperson stated that "all MTV News content is being preserved in an archive" and the removal was "part of broader website changes across Paramount"; Variety noted that this archive is not publicly accessible. Deadline reported that, per sources, "no content has been deleted and the company is exploring how to make this important content available in a more efficient way". In July 2024, the Internet Archive launched an independent "searchable index of 460,575 web pages previously published at mtv.com/news" dating back to 1997 on the Wayback Machine. However, the collection is incomplete as some articles and article images were not archived.

== MTV News International ==
When MTV launched in Europe it used a variation of MTV News US reports with localized European reporting. Upon regionalization of MTV channels in 1997, MTV began to localize presenters and reporting depending on the MTV region. Its flagship programming in Europe consisted of a daily news update MTV News Update and a weekly highlights show called MTV News Weekend Edition; these ceased airing in the early 2000s. With the move of MTV towards more reality based programming MTV News bulletins became a short news bulletin on the hours between 16:00 to 22:00 Monday to Friday on some MTV channels.

As of July 2013, Viacom International Media Networks has launched a new news bulletin which utilises the existing MTV News UK broadcasts. These MTV News International bulletins air on the majority of MTV channels (with exception to MTV US, MTV Canada, MTV Italy, MTV Brazil, MTV Japan, MTV China and MTV Latin America) in the English language which are either dubbed or subtitled. During MTV News broadcasts viewers are directed to mtvnews.co.uk for further news updates. The news bulletins are presented by MTV UK presenters.

MTV Networks confirmed it would relaunch the MTV Brand and its content in mid-2016, MTV have yet to confirm whether this will impact on news broadcasts outside the US.

By 2016, MTV News International was significantly reduced with news reports confined to social media and some localized MTV websites in the UK, the Benelux, Australia and New Zealand.

=== International presenters ===
- Johnny Hockin
- Sharlene Chiu
- Tim Kash
- Ilana Sod
- Laura Whitmore
- Estel
- Jasmine Dotiwala
- Maz Compton
- Darren McMullen
- Erin McNaught
- Ruby Rose
- Irena Ponaroshku
