= This Time (Melanie Fiona song) =

Single by Melanie Fiona featuring J. Cole

from the album The MF Life
- Released: February 20, 2012
- Recorded: 2011
- Genre: R&B
- Length: 3:48
- Label: SRC, Universal Republic
- Songwriters: Ernest Wilson; Johnta Austin; Steve Wyreman; Kevin Randolph; Jermaine Cole
- Producer: No I.D.

Melanie Fiona singles chronology
"4 AM" (2011)	"This Time" (2012)	"Wrong Side of a Love Song" (2012)

J. Cole singles chronology
"Nobody's Perfect" (2012)	"This Time" (2012)	"Power Trip" (2013)

"This Time" is a song by Canadian R&B singer Melanie Fiona from her second studio album, The MF Life (2012). The song was produced by No I.D., written by Ernest Wilson, Johnta Austin, Steve Wyreman, Kevin Randolph, J. Cole. The song features vocals from American hip hop recording artist and record producer J. Cole.

== Music video ==
A music video to accompany the release of "This Time" was first released onto YouTube on June 18, 2012, at a total length of three minutes and forty-seven seconds.

== Track listing ==
Album version
No.	Title	Length
1.	"This Time" (feat. J. Cole)	3:48

== Personnel ==
- Lead vocals – Melanie Fiona
- Producer's – No I.D.
- Lyrics – E. Wilson, Johnta Austin, Steve Wyreman, Kevin Randolph, J. Cole
- Label: SRC, Universal Republic

== Chart performance ==
Chart (2012)	Peak position
US Hot R&B/Hip-Hop Songs (Billboard)	89
