= MTV Showtown =

- Also known as: Showtown
- Presented by: Nicole Holness; Paul Lemieux; Sheena Snively; Graham Chittenden
- Country of origin: Canada

Production
- Production location: Bell Media Queen Street
- Camera setup: Multi-camera

Original release
- Network: MTV Canada
- Release: February 5, 2013 – June 2013

Related
- Live (2006-2012)

MTV Showtown is the flagship show of MTV Canada and the successor to the previous flagship show, MTV Live which premiered on February 5, 2013. The show aired Monday through Thursday at 11pm ET and was created when MTV vacated Live's studio at Masonic Temple. The show consisted of MTV Live's main hosts, with the exception of Daryn Jones, who was replaced by Graham Chittenden.

No new episodes aired after the last week of June 2013, causing speculation that the show had been cancelled by MTV Canada. Repeated requests for information and interviews have not been responded to by MTV Canada producers, show hosts and public relations.

== Set ==
The set located at 299 Queen Street West was designed by AKA Creative, a broadcast design firm that has worked on other Bell Media properties like Discovery Channel's Daily Planet. The design was inspired by the show's urban content and has a gritty warehouse patina. The set is currently being used by Bell Media's entertainment properties.
