= MTV Live (Canadian TV program) =

Former Canadian television program

- Live title card
- Presented by: Nicole Holness; Paul Lemieux; Sheena Snively; Dave Merheje
- Country of origin: Canada
- No. of seasons: 5

Production
- Executive producer: Alex Sopinka
- Production location: Masonic Temple
- Running time: 23 Minutes

Original release
- Network: MTV Canada
- Release: March 21, 2006 – October 31, 2012

Related
- Showtown

MTV Live is a Canadian half-hour music television program that aired from March 21, 2006 to October 31, 2012 as the flagship show of MTV Canada. The program began as an interactive talkshow where viewers were encouraged to jump into the conversation. It is the successor to the talktv program The Chatroom. The show won the 2008 Gemini Award for "Best Talk Series".

After beginning as a show that featured performances, interviews, stories on musicians, and focused on music, the show has become dedicated to focusing on its hosts, with little musical content. The show has become more of variety style comedy show, including the introduction of new "internet style" skits. The show now sometimes features live musical performances by a variety of artists of different genres and success levels, though is decidedly committed to being a 26-minute show on what the hosts do and think.

MTV Live was broadcast from the Masonic Temple in Toronto, and aired Monday through Thursday at 6 pm and 11 pm ET.

== Hosts ==
MTV Live's on-air hosts came from a wide range of backgrounds. The hosts were:

- Host Nicole Holness: Chart-topping R&B/urban artist X-Quisite. Nominated for a Juno Award for Best R&B Recording of the Year
- Host Paul Lemieux: known as "Paul the Intern". Lemieux's official title is Jr. Host, he credited Daryn Jones as his mentor when Jones would leave the show.
- Sheena Snively: The tech and street Correspondent makes appearances in every episode, bringing an over the top crassness to the table. She is Windows 95 certified.
- Dave Merheje: The new guy, a comedian in Toronto.

=== Past hosts ===
- Host Daryn Jones: Buzz (Comedy Network), Rick Mercer Report (CBC) was the shows first host, left in 2012 to pursue new opportunities with CBC Television.
- Jessi Cruickshank: Weird on Wheels (YTV), former host of The After Show
- Dan Levy: Son of actor Eugene Levy, former host of The After Show
- Aliya-Jasmine Sovani: Former producer at MuchMusic, former host of MTV News Canada and Play With AJ.
- Johnny Hockin: DJ and former host of MTV Hacked, formerly a reporter for MTV News Canada and host of Movie Night
- Gilson Lubin: Stand-up comedian, no longer with MTV
- Diane Salema: No longer with MTV
- Declan Dulenno: Actor, No longer with MTV

== History ==
MTV Live was launched on March 21, 2006, with Daryn Jones helping to introduce the hosts. A number of personalities from other MTV channels around the world taped short messages which aired on the program. MTV Live's first guest was Kevin Zegers, a Canadian actor that starred in the movie Transamerica. The second guest, and first live performance, was jazz musician Jamie Cullum. Daily Dancer, a regular webcam guest in 2006, also appeared in the launch episode. The show shared its official on-air launch party with MTV Canada as a channel on April 18, 2006, with live performances by Kanye West and Sam Roberts.

The early episodes used three hosts each day. Starting in mid-May 2006, the show started using two hosts for each MTV Live episode, with Daryn Jones acting as the primary host with alternating co-hosts Jessi Cruickshank, Nicole Holness, Dan Levy, and Aliya-Jasmine Sovani. The remaining MTV hosts continued to appear in short segments during MTV Live and in between other MTV programming in segments known as "Quick Chats".

On the 100th episode (which turned out to be their 101st episode due to a miscount), they showed the worst moments of MTV Live.

MTV Live has been home to many special events, such as The Tussle in the Temple, where Daryn and Paul "The Intern" competed in a legitimate boxing match; MTV Live Gladiators, where the hosts competed in American Gladiator-style events; and Dancing with the Hosts, a dancing competition putting the MTV Live hosts against each other.

On August 18, 2008, noticeable changes occurred with MTV Live. The previously hour-long program was now split into two separate half-hour programs. The first half was still MTV Live, and what was previously referred to as "the second half" was now MTV News, hosted by previous MTV Live hosts Aliya-Jasmine Sovani and Johnny Hockin, as well as music reporter Sharlene Chiu. In the same week, what was previously known as The Hills After Show became a four-day-a-week entertainment and celebrity gossip program now known as The After Show, also hosted by previous MTV Live hosts Dan Levy and Jessi Cruickshank.

On October 9, 2008, the band Fucked Up returned to MTV Live, the first time since January 16, 2007, when the band first performed in the studio and caused thousands of dollars in damage to the set. Lead singer Damien Abraham also sliced his forehead open with a razor blade, leading to mass bleeding. This time the band performed in the men's washroom. Once again, the band (and their fans) caused a large amount of damage, destroying the ceiling, spray painting walls and knocking over amps and a motorcycle which was brought into the washroom as a prop. Fans rushed the doors and joined in the destruction the band had already started. The band was supposed to play three songs, but were stopped midway through the second song as MTV was not aware of the destruction the band had planned and were concerned about the safety of the band, audience, and crew. Some audience members had hidden in separate areas of the studio, due to fear. On October 10, Abraham blogged about the performance on the MTV Live website, saying the bathroom performance was "fucking out of control terrifying".

MTV Live is in its fifth season and remains a 26-minute program. "The second half" previously known as MTV News has been renamed Sex, News & Rock 'n' Roll and features three distinct segments, as reflected in the show's title: pop culture news hosted by Johnny Hockin and Aliya-Jasmine Sovani, a 1 Girl 5 Gays clip montage and previews of five newly released music videos. On Thursday Jonny Hockin hosts a movie night.

The show has since mostly ceased all musical performances and guests, and has become more of a satiric comedy news show. Since 2010, the show now only has 4 hosts - Daryn Jones, Nicole Holness, Paul "The Intern" Leumieux, and Sheena Snively. The show mainly features hosts Daryn and Nicole sitting at a desk, while comedically discussing the news, while the hosts often participate in games and challenges with Paul, such as Freestyle Ambush. Sheena can usually be seen behind Daryn and Nicole interacting with viewers on a computer, while she also hosts a segment of the show called Sheena on the Street, where she goes out onto the Toronto streets surrounding the studio and asks citizens questions, gives them challenges, and dresses up in costumes.

On May 4, 2012, Daryn Jones announced on Twitter that he would be leaving MTV Live. May 9 was his last day on the program. The following day, he was announced as the host of Over the Rainbow, a reality talent competition scheduled to air on CBC Television in the 2012–13 season.

On November 2, 2012, Bell Media announced the relocation of the MTV Canada studio from the Masonic Temple to 299 Queen Street West, effectively cancelling the program. Its successor, MTV Showtown, premiered on February 5, 2013.

== Set ==
The original MTV Live set was designed by 3RD Uncle, an interior design firm based in Toronto. The main seating area was made up of rows of circular couches where the hosts and audience sat. In early 2008, the show began to shoot in different areas of the studio and was updated by designer Adam Nathan, who also designed the set for The After Show.

== Segments ==
- Speaking Out On: Paul, Nicole and Sheena discuss a random topic.
- Lemieux On You: Paul chats and interviews with a random celebrity guest.
- Canadian History: Sheena discuses and explains various acts of Canadian History.
- What Should You Do?: Paul states a situation in which people could find themselves in while Nicole, Sheena and Dave say what they would do. Paul then gives them the correct answer.
- This Trumps That: Paul chooses two similar objects which he compares while, Nicole, Sheena and Dave guess which is better. Paul then gives the answer.
- Making Up Jingles on The Spot: Paul shows Nicole, Sheena and Dave a product to which they have to create a jingle to, according to a tune. The tune changes each time.
- What Were They On?: Paul shows Sheena and Nicole pictures of people. They must then guess what substance they were on.
- Big Questions For Mental Giants: A question is asked which is then answered by each cast member.

=== Previous segments ===
- Live Wire: A round up of strange news, current events, and general interest stories.
- The Virus: A daily viral video clip.
- Ask MTV Live: Viewers email in varying questions for the hosts to answer.
- The Thread: The topic that will be discussed, debated and dissected during that day's show.
- Dear MTV: Viewers e-mail problems and the hosts and audience members suggest possible solutions.
- The Dirt: Jessi Cruickshank's weekly satirical round up of celebrity news and popular culture.
- Modus Poperandi: Dan Levy investigates pop culture phenomena, much like The Dirt.
- On the Radar: An interview with an up-and-coming artists. (now featured in MTV News)
- Word from the Street: Gilson rants on his view of the world.
- DVD Rap Up: Farmer and Nicole review a new DVD movie release in the form of a freestyle rap song.
- Movie Club: Two hosts discuss new theatrical film releases.
- Cyber Treasure: Paul "The Intern" is given $20 to purchase something interesting on the Internet.
- Diane's Dad On...: Correspondent Diane Salema is given advice (in broken English) from her real Portuguese father.
- What Will Diane Do?: Correspondent Diane Salema is given three options which the viewers have voted her, if she chooses and performs one of the tasks described in the options, she receives ten dollars.
- Better Living with B & J Supersquad: Daryn Jones and Paul Lemieux (dressed as Batman and The Joker respectively) give advice on how to properly perform everyday tasks, such as lifting a heavy object, applying sunscreen and bicycle safety.
- Scarborough Farms: Nicole shares some of her favourite meals she remembers from growing up in her home town of Scarborough, Ontario.
- Can Sheena Spell It: Sheena attempts to spell words live on air as she is not a very good speller.
- If I Was God: Daryn discusses what he would do if he were God while speaking with a vocal effect to make him sound like God.
- Sheena Sessions: Sheena shares true stories with Daryn about her troubled youth, which are later reenacted by herself and other staff members.
- Think Tank: The hosts try to solve problems sent in by viewers.
- Sheenooki Shore: A segment which airs every Thursday in honour of Jersey Shore. Sheena plays Sheenooki, the Snooki of Canada.
- Twitter Me A Script: Viewers tweet a script of a short film using Twitter.com/DarynJones and they produce it, word for word.

== Quick Chats ==
MTV hosts also used to appear in short segments known as Quick Chats, which were seen during regular MTV programming. The hosts were often joined by viewers via webcam, phone, or through email submissions. On occasion, the hosts are also joined by guests. Previous guests include MTV reality star Tila Tequila, Canadian dancer Blake McGrath, reality TV regular Evan Starkman and bands such as Moneen, The Most Serene Republic, illScarlett, and Alexisonfire.

== MTV Shuffle ==
Active from 2007 to 2008, every Friday the best moments of the week from MTV Live and MTV News were edited into a one-hour program called MTV Shuffle. This program also appeared on CTV.

== Hacked ==
Hacked was an interactive chat which viewers participated in through MTV Hive. A small chat window was displayed during the program, showing selected portions of the chat. Throughout Hacked, the original MTV Live episode is paused to allow host Johnny Hockin to make comments about the chat, ask questions to viewers and send shout outs to the chatters. The show was discontinued in 2007.
