= Darren Lewis (disambiguation) =

Darren Lewis (born 1967) is an American baseball player.

Darren Lewis may also refer to:

- Darren Lewis (American football) (1968–2024), American professional football player
- Darren Lewis, American songwriter, co-writer of "Smile (Lily Allen song)" and "Ay Yo"

== See also ==
- Darin Lewis (born 1976), Trinidadian soccer player
