= Adam Rodriguez =

American actor, writer, and director (born 1975)

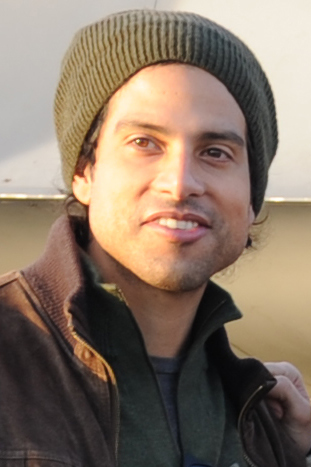
- Rodriguez in 2015
- Born: Adam Michael Rodriguez; April 2, 1975 (age 51); Yonkers, New York, U.S.
- Occupations: Actor; screenwriter; director
- Years active: 1997–present
- Spouse: Grace Gail (m. 2016)
- Children: 3

Adam Michael Rodriguez (born April 2, 1975) is an American actor, screenwriter and director. He became known for his role as Eric Delko on CSI: Miami. He currently portrays Task Force Agent Luke Alvez in Criminal Minds.

== Early life ==
Rodriguez was born in Yonkers, New York, the son of Janet, an airline ticket agent, and Ramon Rodriguez, an executive with the United States Hispanic Chamber of Commerce.

His father is of half Puerto Rican and half Cuban descent, and his mother is of Puerto Rican ancestry.

He attended Clarkstown High School North in New City, New York, graduating in 1993. Rodriguez initially hoped to be a professional baseball player, but after a high school injury, he turned his attention to acting and performed in a children's theater in New York.

Before full-time acting, he was a stockbroker.

== Career ==
Rodriguez has appeared in commercials, including one for Coca-Cola. He later appeared on Brooklyn South, Law & Order, Felicity, Roswell, and NYPD Blue.

He appeared in a number of music videos, including Jennifer Lopez's 1999 video "If You Had My Love"; Busta Rhymes' "Respect My Conglomerate"; Lionel Richie's "I Call It Love"; Melanie Fiona's "It Kills Me"; 50 Cent's "Many Men"; and Wisin & Yandel's "No Dejemos Que Se Apague". He was a participant in the pro-Barack Obama video "Yes We Can".

He starred in 18 episodes of Roswell (Season 3)

He was part of the original cast of CSI: Miami, which premiered in 2002. He later directed and wrote the episode "Hunting Ground" (season 9, episode 16). He left the main cast five episodes into season 8 and was credited as a recurring cast member for eight episodes. He returned to the main cast in season 9 and remained on the show until it ended with season 10 in 2012.

Rodriguez starred in the 2009 Tyler Perry movie I Can Do Bad All by Myself as Sandino. He co-starred in a smaller film, Love and Debate. He played Bobby, Hilda's love interest, in season 4 of Ugly Betty.

He appeared in Let the Game Begin (2010), Magic Mike (2012), Magic Mike XXL (2015), and Magic Mike's Last Dance (2023).

In 2015, he was cast in the recurring role of Dr. Chavez in the second season of The Night Shift.

Rodriguez was on the cover of H mag in April 2012, photographed by Joey Shaw. .

In 2016, Rodriguez was cast as Luke Alvez, an FBI Fugitive Task Force Agent who joins the Behavioral Analysis Unit in season 12 of Criminal Minds, replacing Shemar Moore.

In 2021, Rodriguez was cast as Bobby Diaz in a recurring role in the NBC drama series Ordinary Joe.

== Personal life ==
Rodriguez married model Grace Gail, the daughter of actor Max Gail, in 2016. They have three children, including son Bridgemont Bernard Rodriguez, who was born on March 16, 2020.

== Filmography ==
=== Film ===
Year	Title	Role	Notes	Refs.
2000	Details	Chris	Short film	
2001	Impostor	Trooper #1		
2002	King Rikki	Alejandro Rojas		
2005	Keeper of the Past	Stanley	Short film	
2006	Love & Debate	Elias		
2006	Splinter	Private Martinez		
2006	Unknown	County Doctor		
2007	Take	Steven		
2008	B.O.H.I.C.A.	Diz		
2008	A Kiss of Chaos	Freddie		
2008	Christmas Break	Alejandro	Short film	
2008	15 Minutes of Fame	Casting Director		
2009	I Can Do Bad All By Myself	Sandino		
2010	Let the Game Begin	Rowan Sly 'Ricky'		
2010	Cielito lindo	Leonardo		
2010	Caught in the Crossfire	Shepherd	Direct-to-video	
2012	Magic Mike	Tito		
2014	About Last Night	Steven Thaler		
2014	Lovesick	Jason		
2015	Magic Mike XXL	Tito		
2017	Axis	—N/a	Voice role	
2017	CHiPs	Shamus		
2018	Incredibles 2	Detective No. 2	Cameo Voice role	
2021	A Christmas Proposal	Julian Diaz		
2023	Magic Mike's Last Dance	Tito		
2023	Scrambled	Sterling "Peter Pan"		

=== Television ===
Year	Title	Role	Notes	Refs.
1997	NYPD Blue	Uniform Cop	Episode: "Upstairs, Downstairs"	
1997–1998	Brooklyn South	Officer Hector Villanueva	Main role 19 episodes	
1999	Ryan Caulfield: Year One	Guest	Episode: "Pilot"	
1999	Law & Order	Chino	Episode: "Marathon"	
1999–2000	Felicity	Erik Kidd	Recurring role 3 episodes	
2001	All Souls	Patrick Fortado	Recurring role 6 episodes	
2001–2002	Resurrection Blvd.	Jorge	Recurring role 4 episodes	
2001–2002	Roswell	Jesse Esteban Ramirez	Main role (season 3); 18 episodes	
2001	CSI: Crime Scene Investigation	Eric Delko	Episode: "Cross-Jurisdictions"	
2002–2012	CSI: Miami	Eric Delko	Main role 219 episodes	
2003	Queens Supreme	Hector Martinez	Episode: "Pilot"	
2004	Six Feet Under	Kenny Simms	Episode: "The Black Forest"	
2005	Kim Possible	Burn Burnam	Voice role Episode: "Team Impossible"	
2005	Category 7: The End of the World	USAF Pilot Ritter	Miniseries	
2007	NCIS	Dead Body in the Taxi	Episode: "Trojan Horse"	
2009–2010	Ugly Betty	Bobby Talercio	Recurring role 11 episodes	
2010	Psych	Tommy Nix	Episode: "Shawn and Gus in Drag (Racing)"	
2011	Sesame Street	Detective Alfie Betts	Episode: "Letter 'R' Mystery"	
2012	Necessary Roughness	Edmund "Gonzo" Gonzalez	Episode: "Slumpbuster"	
2013	The Goodwin Games	Ivan	Recurring role 3 episodes	
2014	Reckless	Preston Cruz	Main role 13 episodes	
2015	The Night Shift	Dr. Joseph "Joey" Chavez	Recurring role 6 episodes	
2015–2018	Jane the Virgin	Jonathan Chavez	Recurring role 7 episodes	
2015	Empire	Laz Delgado	Recurring role 5 episodes	
2015	Runner	Troy	Television film	
2016	Chunk & Bean	Jim Herrera	Pilot	
2016	Lip Sync Battle	Himself	Episode: "Channing Tatum vs. Jenna Dewan-Tatum"	
2016–2020; 2022–present	Criminal Minds	Luke Alvez	103 episodes Main role (seasons 12–present)	
2020	Penny Dreadful: City of Angels	Raul Vega	Recurring role	
2020	One Day at a Time	Danny	Episode: "Boundaries"	
2021	Ordinary Joe	Bobby Diaz	Recurring role	

=== Director ===
Year	Title	Notes
2011–2012	CSI: Miami	Episodes: "Hunting Ground" & "At Risk"
2015	Scorpion	Episode: "Dam Breakthrough"
2018–2026	Criminal Minds	Episodes: "Last Gasp", "Ashley", "Pay-Per View", "Homesick" & "The Witching Hour"

=== Writer ===
Year	Title	Notes
2011–2012	CSI: Miami	Episodes: "Hunting Ground" & "At Risk"

=== Music videos ===
Year	Title	Role	Notes
1999	"If You Had My Love"	Man in dark room	Jennifer Lopez music video
2003	"Many Men"	Detective	50 Cent music video
2006	"I Call It Love"	Nicole Richie's Boyfriend	Lionel Richie music video
2009	"Respect My Conglomerate"	Police officer	Busta Rhymes music video
2009	"It Kills Me"	Boyfriend	Melanie Fiona music video

== Awards and nominations ==
Year (Note: Indicates the year of ceremony. Each year is linked to the article about the awards held that year, wherever possible.)	Award	Category	Project	Result	Refs.
2013	MTV Movie Awards	Best Musical Moment	Magic Mike	Nominated	
