= List of number-one R&B/hip-hop songs of 2010 (U.S.) =

The Billboard Hot R&B/Hip-Hop Songs chart ranks the best-performing singles in that category in the United States. The first number one song of the year was claimed by Trey Songz with his song "I Invented Sex", featuring Drake. "I Invented Sex" also spent the last week of 2009 atop the chart, and therefore spent two consecutive weeks atop the chart in total. Melanie Fiona's song "It Kills Me" topped the chart for nine consecutive weeks, and ranked as the number three song on Billboard's Hot R&B/Hip-Hop Songs year end list. It was replaced by Robin Thicke's "Sex Therapy", which peaked at number one for two consecutive weeks. "Sex Therapy" ranked as the number ten song on the Hot R&B/Hip-Hop Songs year end list. Drake topped the chart for a second time as a featured artist on Timbaland's song "Say Something". On April 3, Monica's "Everything to Me" ascended to number, and remained atop the chart for a further six consecutive weeks. On May 22, Alicia Keys' song "Un-Thinkable (I'm Ready)" topped the chart for twelve consecutive weeks. It ranked as the number one song on the Hot R&B/Hip-Hop Songs year end list. Usher's song "There Goes My Baby" peaked at number one for four weeks, and ranked as the number two song on the Hot R&B/Hip-Hop Songs year end list. Chris Brown's song "Deuces", featuring Tyga & Kevin McCall, topped the chart for nine consecutive weeks, and ranked as the number nine song on the Hot R&B/Hip-Hop Songs year end list. Trey Songz also topped the chart with "Can't Be Friends", a position it held for the final seven weeks of 2010.

== List ==
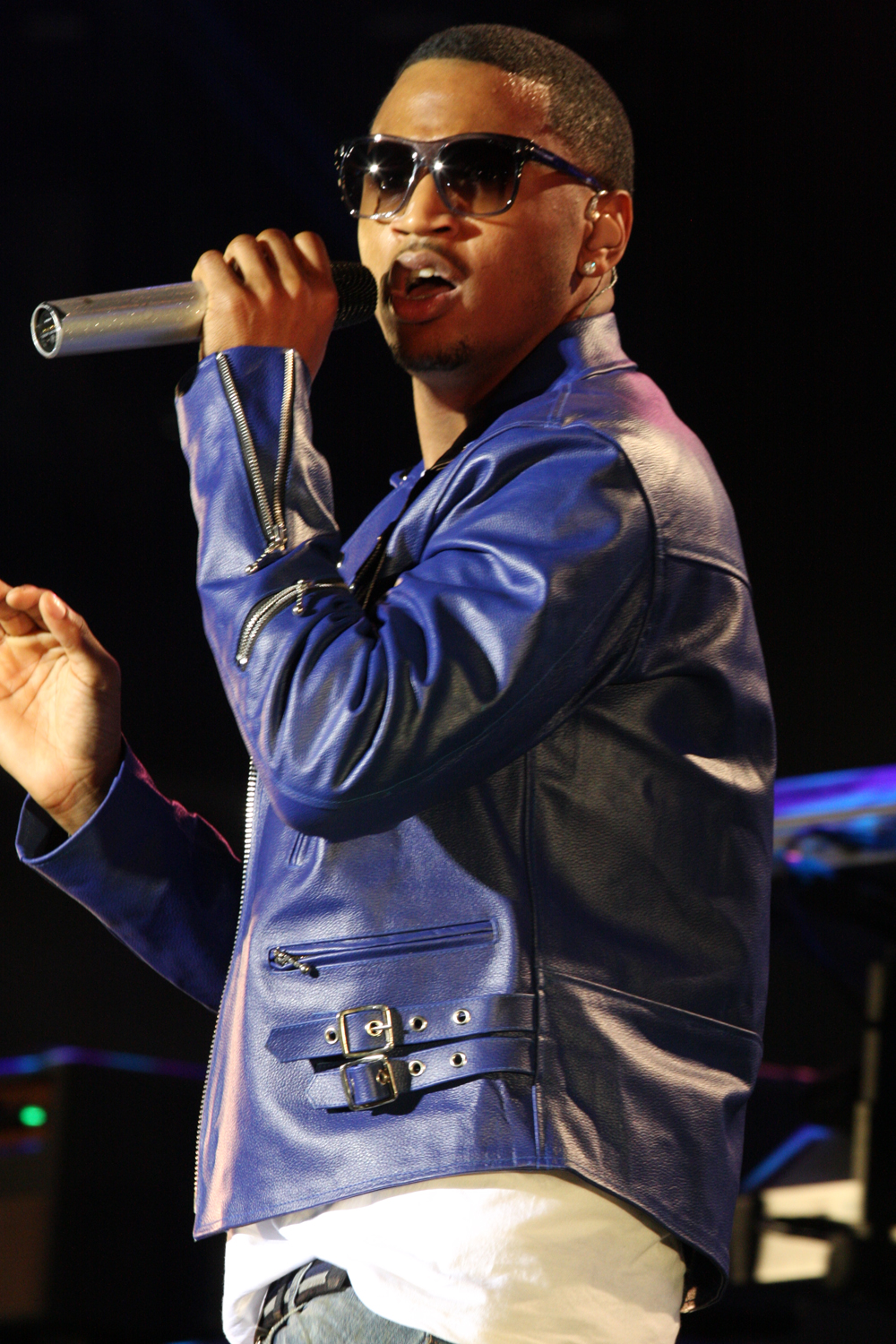
Trey Songz topped the chart twice in 2010 with "I Invented Sex" and "Can't Be Friends".

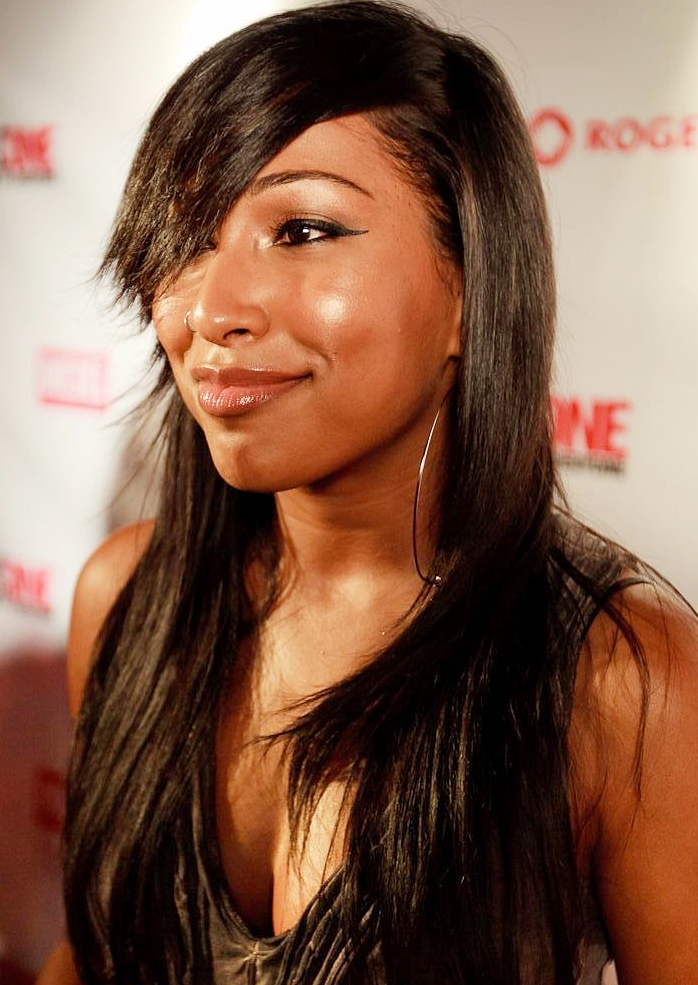
Melanie Fiona topped the chart for nine consecutive weeks with "It Kills Me".

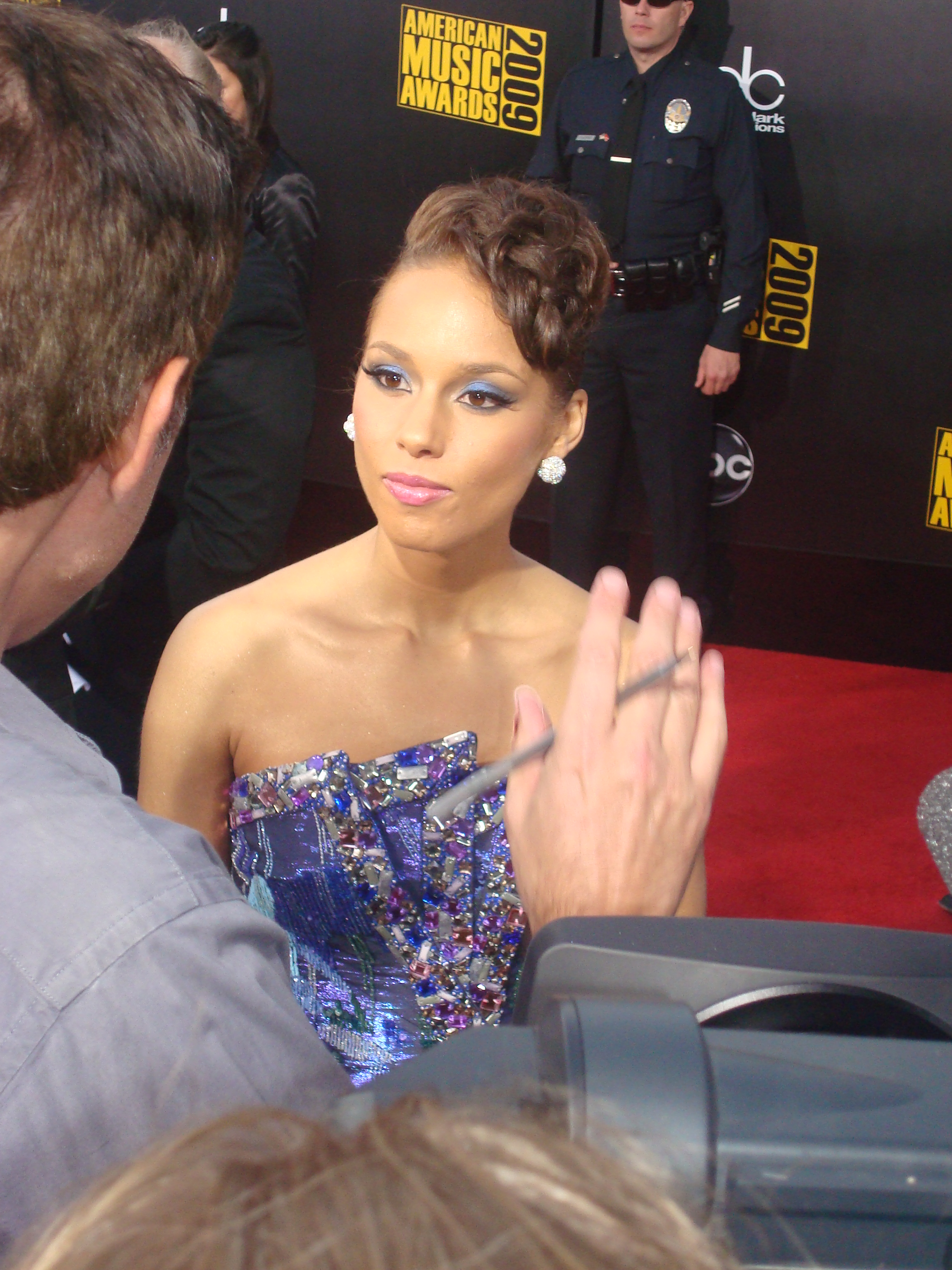
Alicia Keys' song "Un-Thinkable (I'm Ready)" ranked as the number one song on Billboard's Hot R&B/Hip-Hop Songs year end list.

Key
†	Indicates best charting R&B single of 2010; Note: Year-End most popular R&B/Hip-Hop songs, ranked by radio airplay audience impressions as measured by Nielsen BDS and sales data as compiled Nielsen SoundScan

Issue date	Song	Artist(s)	Ref.
January 2	"I Invented Sex"	Trey Songz featuring Drake	
January 9	"It Kills Me"	Melanie Fiona	
January 16	"It Kills Me"	Melanie Fiona	
January 23	"It Kills Me"	Melanie Fiona	
January 30	"It Kills Me"	Melanie Fiona	
February 6	"It Kills Me"	Melanie Fiona	
February 13	"It Kills Me"	Melanie Fiona	
February 20	"It Kills Me"	Melanie Fiona	
February 27	"It Kills Me"	Melanie Fiona	
March 6	"It Kills Me"	Melanie Fiona	
March 13	"Sex Therapy"	Robin Thicke	
March 20	"Sex Therapy"	Robin Thicke	
March 27	"Say Something"	Timbaland featuring Drake	
April 3	"Everything to Me"	Monica	
April 10	"Everything to Me"	Monica	
April 17	"Everything to Me"	Monica	
April 24	"Everything to Me"	Monica	
May 1	"Everything to Me"	Monica	
May 8	"Everything to Me"	Monica	
May 15	"Everything to Me"	Monica	
May 22	"Un-Thinkable (I'm Ready)" †	Alicia Keys	
May 29	"Un-Thinkable (I'm Ready)" †	Alicia Keys	
June 5	"Un-Thinkable (I'm Ready)" †	Alicia Keys	
June 12	"Un-Thinkable (I'm Ready)" †	Alicia Keys	
June 19	"Un-Thinkable (I'm Ready)" †	Alicia Keys	
June 26	"Un-Thinkable (I'm Ready)" †	Alicia Keys	
July 3	"Un-Thinkable (I'm Ready)" †	Alicia Keys	
July 10	"Un-Thinkable (I'm Ready)" †	Alicia Keys	
July 17	"Un-Thinkable (I'm Ready)" †	Alicia Keys	
July 24	"Un-Thinkable (I'm Ready)" †	Alicia Keys	
July 31	"Un-Thinkable (I'm Ready)" †	Alicia Keys	
August 7	"Un-Thinkable (I'm Ready)" †	Alicia Keys	
August 14	"There Goes My Baby"	Usher	
August 21	"There Goes My Baby"	Usher	
August 28	"There Goes My Baby"	Usher	
September 4	"There Goes My Baby"	Usher	
September 11	"Deuces"	Chris Brown featuring Tyga & Kevin McCall	
September 18	"Deuces"	Chris Brown featuring Tyga & Kevin McCall	
September 25	"Deuces"	Chris Brown featuring Tyga & Kevin McCall	
October 2	"Deuces"	Chris Brown featuring Tyga & Kevin McCall	
October 9	"Deuces"	Chris Brown featuring Tyga & Kevin McCall	
October 16	"Deuces"	Chris Brown featuring Tyga & Kevin McCall	
October 23	"Deuces"	Chris Brown featuring Tyga & Kevin McCall	
October 30	"Deuces"	Chris Brown featuring Tyga & Kevin McCall	
November 6	"Deuces"	Chris Brown featuring Tyga & Kevin McCall	
November 13	"Can't Be Friends"	Trey Songz	
November 20	"Can't Be Friends"	Trey Songz	
November 27	"Can't Be Friends"	Trey Songz	
December 4	"Can't Be Friends"	Trey Songz	
December 11	"Can't Be Friends"	Trey Songz	
December 18	"Can't Be Friends"	Trey Songz	
December 25	"Can't Be Friends"	Trey Songz	

== See also ==
- 2010 in music
- Billboard Year-End Hot R&B/Hip-Hop Songs of 2010
- List of number-one rhythm and blues hits (United States)
