= Marky (rapper) =

American rapper

- Born: Marcus D. Plater; December 7, 1988 (age 37)
- Origin: Kenilworth, Washington D.C., United States
- Genres: Hip hop/Rap/Pop
- Occupations: Rapper, Singer
- Years active: 2007–present
- Label: Studio 43/SRC Records/Universal Republic

Marky (real name Marcus D. Plater, born December 7, 1988) is a rap/hip-hop artist from Washington D.C. signed under SRC Records/Universal Republic.

== Early life ==
Raised in Kenilworth, Washington, D.C., and heavily influenced by the District's percussion-based rhythms of "Go-Go", Marky has also become a student of hip-hop, embracing a variety of influences. At the age of 11, Marky began his journey as an artist – from rapping over hip-hop classics and teaming up for a song with the legendary Erick Sermon of EPMD, to experiencing the opportunity to freestyle with Big Daddy Kane.

== Rap career ==
In 2006, Ken Williams introduced Marky to Mark "TarBoy" Williams of the St. Louis-based production duo Trackboyz, known for crafting chart topping hits for Nelly ("Air Force Ones") and J-Kwon ("Tipsy"), among others. The Trackboyz signed him to their upstart label.

Marky then joined the Studio 43 boutique label. He released the go-go-influenced single "Thug Passion" and opened the Screamfest '07 tour in Washington, D.C. He then went on to release two mixtapes: Homework 4.3 and The Drive-Thru, both of which were hosted by DJ Mick Boogie. Shortly after, Marky's first single "Sheila" caught the attention of SRC Records chairman Steve Rifkind. On April 3, 2009, Marky released the "mini-album" Nothing is 43ver.

After parting ways with Studio 43, Marky has set out on his own with his new bi-coastal team Winning Streak on a new project titled Divine Intervention. It was released in 2012 as a free digital release.

== Discography ==
=== Singles ===
Year	Song	Album
2008	Sheila	
2010	Where She From?	Markyland, USA

=== Albums ===
Year	Title	Label
2007	Homework	Studio 43
2007	Homework 4.3	Studio 43
2008	The Drive-Thru	Studio 43
2009	Nothing is 43ver	Studio 43/SRC Records
2010	Journey to Markyland, USA: Rest Stop 1	Studio 43/SRC Records
2010	Journey to Markyland, USA: Rest Stop 2	Studio 43/SRC Records
2010	Journey to Markyland, USA: Rest Stop 3	Studio 43/SRC Records
2012	Divine Intervention	Winning Streak/Universal Republic Records
