= Ay Yo =

Single by Melanie Fiona

from the album The Bridge
- Released: 17 April 2010
- Recorded: 2010
- Genre: R&B, soul
- Length: 3:17
- Label: SRC
- Songwriters: Andrea Martin; Allen Toussaint; Darren Lewis; Iyiola Babalola; Melanie Hallim
- Producer: Future Cut

Melanie Fiona singles chronology
| "Monday Morning" (2009) | "Ay Yo" (2010) | "Wake Up Everybody" (2010) |

"Ay Yo" is a song by Canadian R&B singer Melanie Fiona from her debut album, The Bridge (2009). The song was written by Andrea Martin, Allen Toussaint, Darren Lewis, Iyiola Babalola, Melanie Hallim, and was produced by Future Cut.

== Music video ==
A music video to accompany the release of "Ay Yo" was first released onto YouTube on 7 April 2010 at a total length of three minutes and fifty-four seconds.

== Track listing ==
Album version
| No. | Title | Length |
|---|---|---|
| 1. | "Ay Yo" | 3:17 |

== Chart performance ==
| Chart (2011) | Peak position |
|---|---|
| Switzerland (Schweizer Hitparade) | 62 |
| US Hot R&B/Hip-Hop Songs (Billboard) | 71 |
