= Daryn Jones =

Canadian comedian and television personality

- Born: January 3, 1978 (age 48); Victoria, British Columbia, Canada

Daryn Jones (born January 3, 1978, in Victoria, British Columbia) is a Canadian comedian and radio and television personality.

== Career ==
He began his career in stand-up comedy clubs at the age of 17, receiving formal training in a private training school.

He and fellow comedian Morgan "Mista Mo" Smith co-wrote and co-starred on the sketch comedy television show Buzz on the Toronto Community Access Channel in the mid-1990s. The show was picked up by the Canada-wide cable channel Comedy Network in 2000. In 2004, Jones was hired for the Rick Mercer Report, where he was a writer and an on-air correspondent. Buzz ended its run the next year.

In 1999, Jones co-hosted a morning show for contemporary hit radio station KISS 92 FM with Jay Michaels but left to focus on his television career after Buzz was picked up by The Comedy Network.

Jones made multiple appearances on CTV's Open Mike with Mike Bullard. He hosted Laughing Matters and YTV's flagship weekday afternoon programming block The Zone and has written for Oro Magazine and the National Post. Jones was a featured performer at the 2000 Canadian Comedy Awards, and received the 2001 Gemini Award for Best Writing in a Comedy Series for Buzz.

In 2006 he became the host of MTV Canada's flagship series MTV Live, alongside co-hosts Nicole Holness, Paul "The Intern" Lemieux, and Sheena Snively. Jones has interviewed a variety of newsworthy guests including Dave Navarro, Mark Wahlberg, Brian Stever, The Cult, Tom Cruise, Feist, Tori Spelling, Nelly Furtado, Weird Al Yankovic, Trailer Park Boys, Jake Gyllenhaal, and Quentin Tarantino. He has appeared in commercials for Blockbuster Video and Arby's. He also appeared in Degrassi: The Next Generation in the episode "The Ghost In The Machine- Part 1" as a guitar salesman. In 2010 he was a correspondent with CTV for the Vancouver 2010 Olympics. He also had a small part in Seventeen Again with Tia, Tamera and Tahj Mowry.

On May 4, 2012, he announced via Twitter that he would be leaving MTV Live. May 9 was Jones' last day on the program; the following day, he was announced as the host of Over the Rainbow, a reality talent competition which aired on CBC Television in the 2012–13 season. Sometime after the conclusion of the show, Jones began to appear sporadically on Hockey Night in Canada for its 60th season. Not long after, Jones began appearing on Donut Showdown alongside Eden Grinshpan.

Jones returned to KISS 92.5 in 2018 and was the afternoon drive/early evening host.

In December 2023, he became the co-host of Virgin Radio Toronto's morning drive show with Deepa Prashad.
