= Gone and Never Coming Back =

Single by Melanie Fiona

from the album The MF Life
- Released: January 11, 2011
- Recorded: 2010
- Genre: R&B, soul
- Length: 3:45
- Label: SRC, Universal Motown
- Songwriters: Andrea Martin; Robert Littlejohn Jr
- Producer: Jay Fenix

Melanie Fiona singles chronology
"Priceless" (2010)	"Gone and Never Coming Back" (2011)	"Let It Rain" (2011)

"Gone and Never Coming Back" is a song by Canadian R&B singer Melanie Fiona from her second studio album, The MF Life (2012). It was the first single taken from the album. It was released January 11, 2011.

== Music video ==
The video was uploaded to YouTube by Vevo on March 10, 2011. It was directed by Colin Tilley. In the video Light bulbs explode, wine glasses shatter, and fire erupts as the Canadian songbird shares her emotional tale of love lost in the Colin Tilley-directed clip.

== Chart performance ==
The song peaked at 37 on May 7, 2011, on the US Billboard R&B/Hip-Hop Chart.

=== Charts ===
Chart (2011)	Peak position
US Hot R&B/Hip-Hop Songs (Billboard)	37
