= Wrong Side of a Love Song =

2012 R&B song by Melanie Fiona

"Wrong Side of A Love Song"

Single by Melanie Fiona

from the album The MF Life
- Released: August 7, 2012
- Recorded: 2011–12
- Genre: R&B
- Length: 4:30
- Label: SRC, Universal Republic
- Songwriters: Melanie Hallim, Matthew Kahane, George Soule
- Producer: Jack Splash

"Wrong Side of A Love Song" is a song by Canadian R&B and soul singer–songwriter Melanie Fiona from her second studio album, The MF Life. Produced by Jack Splash. It was released August 7, 2012, on SRC Records and Universal Republic Records.

"Wrong Side of A Love Song" was nominated for a Grammy Award in 2013. It peaked at number 15 on the Adult R&B Songs chart.

== Music video ==
The music video for Melanie Fiona's Grammy nominated single, "Wrong Side Of A Love Song" was directed by Larenz Tate and features actor Omari Hardwick.
