= Bang Bang (Melanie Fiona song) =

Single by Melanie Fiona

from the album The Bridge
- Released: October 18, 2009
- Recorded: 2008
- Genre: Pop, R&B, soul
- Length: 3:28
- Label: SRC, Universal Motown
- Songwriters: Angela Hunte; Janet Sewell-Ulepić; Rob Fusari
- Producer: Rob Fusari

Melanie Fiona singles chronology
"It Kills Me" (2009)	"Bang Bang" (2009)	"Monday Morning" (2009)

"Bang Bang" is a song by Canadian R&B singer Melanie Fiona from her debut album, The Bridge (2009). It was the third single taken from the album and the second to be released in the UK and Canada.

"Bang Bang" was produced by Rob Fusari, with vocal production by Angela Hunte and Janet "Jnay" Sewell-Ulepic. The song was recorded by Fusari at 150 Studios, New Jersey and Saam Hashemi at Phase One Studios, Toronto.

The intro to "Bang Bang" is a sample of a 2007 unreleased track "Shake Ur Kitty" by Lady Gaga also produced by Rob Fusari.

== Music video ==
The music video for "Bang Bang" premiered in September 2009. It features Fiona performing the song with her band alongside shots of her in a police cell and line-up. The video was shot in the UK and was directed by Phil Griffin (who also shot Amy Winehouse's "Rehab" video). Fiona described the video: "It's like 'The Usual Suspects' meets this amazing rock performance." She also stated "It's just a really great, high-energy performance video with a great storyline. It's just really entertaining.".

== Formats and track listings ==
UK Digital download

1. "Bang Bang" (Album Version) - 3:28
2. "Bang Bang" (WaWa Remix) - 6:03
3. "Bang Bang" (Attacca Pesante Remix) - 3:55
