= 4 AM (Melanie Fiona song) =

Single by Melanie Fiona

from the album The MF Life
- Released: September 6, 2011
- Recorded: 2011
- Genre: R&B
- Length: 4:50
- Label: SRC, Universal Republic
- Songwriters: Melanie Fiona Hallim; Richard Butler Jr.; Mike Morgan-Carter
- Producers: Rico Love; Earl Hood; Eric Goudy II

Melanie Fiona singles chronology
"Let It Rain" (2011)	"4 AM" (2011)	"This Time" (2012)

"4 AM" is a song by Canadian R&B singer Melanie Fiona from her second studio album, The MF Life (2012). It is the second single taken from the album released on September 6, 2011.

== Music video ==
A music video to accompany the release of "4 AM" was first released onto YouTube on October 5, 2011.

== Track listing ==
All tracks are written by download.

Digital download #1
No.	Title	Length
1.	"4 AM" (Explicit version)	4:55

Digital download #2
No.	Title	Length
1.	"4 AM" (Clean version)	4:51

== Charts ==
=== Weekly charts ===
Chart (2011–12)	Peak position
US Billboard Hot 100	81
US Hot R&B/Hip-Hop Songs (Billboard)	8

=== Year-end charts ===
Chart (2012)	Position
US Hot R&B/Hip-Hop Songs (Billboard)	35

== Certifications ==
Region	Certification	Certified units/sales
United States (RIAA)	Gold	500,000^{‡}
^{‡} Sales+streaming figures based on certification alone.

== 6 AM ==
"6 AM" was the official remix featuring T-Pain, peaking at No. 73 on the Billboard R&B/Hip-Hop chart.

=== Weekly charts ===
Chart (2012)	Peak position
US Hot R&B/Hip-Hop Songs (Billboard)	73
