= Give It to Me Right =

Single by Melanie Fiona

from the album The Bridge
- Released: February 28, 2009
- Recorded: 2008
- Genre: Psychedelic rock, R&B, soul
- Length: 3:40
- Label: SRC, Universal Motown
- Songwriters: Andrea Martin; Rod Argent
- Producers: Rod Argent; Andrea Martin

Melanie Fiona singles chronology
| "Give It to Me Right" (2009) | "It Kills Me" (2009) |

"Give It to Me Right" is a song by Canadian R&B singer Melanie Fiona from her debut album, The Bridge (2009). Written and produced by Andrea Martin and Rod Argent, the track was sent to radio outlets as the album's lead single on February 28, 2009. It samples the 1968 hit "Time of the Season" by the Zombies.

The music video for "Give It to Me Right" ranked at number 74 on BET's Notarized: Top 100 Videos of 2009 countdown.

== Charts ==
=== Weekly charts ===
| Chart (2009) | Peak position |
|---|---|
| Austria (Ö3 Austria Top 40) | 54 |
| Canada Hot 100 (Billboard) | 20 |
| Canada AC (Billboard) | 2 |
| Canada CHR/Top 40 (Billboard) | 23 |
| Canada Hot AC (Billboard) | 12 |
| Croatia International Airplay (HRT) | 7 |
| Germany (GfK) | 31 |
| Greece Digital Songs (Billboard) | 5 |
| Italy (FIMI) | 9 |
| Scotland Singles (OCC) | 36 |
| Switzerland (Schweizer Hitparade) | 5 |
| UK Singles (OCC) | 41 |
| UK Hip Hop/R&B (OCC) | 15 |
| US Hot R&B/Hip-Hop Songs (Billboard) | 57 |

=== Year-end charts ===
| Chart (2009) | Position |
|---|---|
| Canada (Canadian Hot 100) | 93 |
| Croatia International Airplay (HRT) | 15 |
| Italy (FIMI) | 80 |
| Switzerland (Schweizer Hitparade) | 56 |
