= Monday Morning (Melanie Fiona song) =

Single by Melanie Fiona

from the album The Bridge
- Released: October 25, 2009; 2010 (UK)
- Recorded: 2008
- Genre: Pop; doo-wop
- Length: 3:38
- Label: SRC, Universal Motown
- Songwriter(s): Peter Wade Keusch; Sidh Solanki; Charlene Gilliam
- Producer(s): Peter Wade Keusch; Sidh Solanki

Melanie Fiona singles chronology
"Bang Bang" (2009)	"Monday Morning" (2009)	"Ay Yo" (2010)

"Monday Morning" is a song by Canadian R&B singer Melanie Fiona from her debut album, The Bridge (2009). The song was Produced by Peter Wade Keusch and Sidh Solanki, written by Peter Wade Keusch, Sidh Solanki, and Charlene Gilliam, and recorded at LaBronze Johnson Studios, NYC. It was released as the third single for the United States, as the song received airplay on adult top 40 radio stations. It was released to radio stations in Canada because hot adult contemporary radio station CKZZ-FM (Virgin Radio 953) in Vancouver played it starting April 2010, which made Monday Morning the fifth single from The Bridge released in Canada. In addition, another Canadian add was on Galaxie's Pop Adult channel.

== Chart performance ==
"Monday Morning" debuted on the Swiss Singles Chart at number eighty on the issue date of October 25, 2009, and has since peaked at number one. The song has become successful in Poland, Austria and Hungary.

=== Weekly charts ===
Chart (2009–2010)	Peak position
Austria (Ö3 Austria Top 40)	3
Germany (GfK)	46
Hungary (Rádiós Top 40)	1
Poland (Polish Airplay Top 100)	1
Slovakia (Rádio Top 100)	13
Sweden (Sverigetopplistan)	11
Switzerland (Schweizer Hitparade)	1

=== Year-end charts ===
Chart (2009)	Position
Switzerland (Schweizer Hitparade)	37
Chart (2010)	Position
Austria (Ö3 Austria Top 40)	23
Hungary (Rádiós Top 40)	12
Sweden (Sverigetopplistan)	32
Switzerland (Schweizer Hitparade)	19
Chart (2011)	Position
Hungary (Rádiós Top 40)	17

== Certifications ==
Region	Certification	Certified units/sales
Sweden (GLF)	Platinum	20,000^{‡}
Switzerland (IFPI Switzerland)	Platinum	30,000^{^}
^{^} Shipments figures based on certification alone.^{‡} Sales+streaming figures based on certification alone.

== See also ==
- List of number-one singles of the 2000s (Switzerland)
- List of number-one singles in 2010 (Hungary)
- List of number-one singles of 2010 (Poland)
