= MTV News (Canadian TV program) =

- Genre: Entertainment news
- Starring: Aliya-Jasmine Sovani (anchor/host); Johnny Hockin (correspondent); Sharlene Chiu (correspondent)
- Country of origin: Canada
- Original language: English
- No. of seasons: 2

Production
- Producer: Joe Keenan
- Production locations: Toronto, Ontario
- Running time: approx. 33 minutes

Original release
- Network: MTV
- Release: August 18, 2008 – 2014

MTV News is a Canadian entertainment and pop culture news program on the Canadian cable specialty channel MTV. The program debuted on August 18, 2008.

MTV News is hosted by Aliya-Jasmine Sovani, along with correspondents Johnny Hockin and Sharlene Chiu. MTV News reports on the day's entertainment and pop culture news and interviews with emerging and well-known artists in music and celebrities.

The program's cancellation was announced in 2014, as part of significant staffing and production cutbacks at Bell Media.

== Beginning ==
MTV News originated as a segment on MTV's flagship program MTV LIVE, with Sharlene Chiu reporting on trends in music, often travelling to high-profile music events and interviewing artists. MTV News developed into its own half-hour program on August 18, 2008 when MTV LIVE was transformed into a half-hour program and MTV News taking the last half of the hour.

== Reformatting ==
As of September 2009, MTV News functioned under the program name 'Sex, News & Rock 'n' Roll' airing weekdays at 6:26 pm. The first 10 minutes of the show featured Sovani with the day's top headlines, continued with in-depth reporting from Sharlene Chiu and Johnny Hockin and ended with a sneak peek of 1 Girl 5 Gays.

== Spin-offs and specials ==
=== Movie Night ===
MTV News has also developed Movie Night, a weekly show airing Thursdays at 6:26 pm, where Johnny Hockin reviews movies being released to theatres or on DVD the next day or in the near future.

=== MTV News Weekend ===
A weekly round up of the week's best stories and headlines airing Saturdays at 6:00 pm on MTV Canada.

=== Sharlene VS. ===
MTV News special featuring resident music expert Sharlene Chiu traveling to a city and discovering various places with a wide range of artists and bands.

=== Brandon Flowers plays with MTV News ===
Originally aired September 17, 2010, Brandon Flowers performed songs from his new solo album and sat down in an intimate conversation with Sovani, Chiu and Hockin to discuss the new album, his love of Las Vegas and the future of The Killers.

=== MTV News Impact: Inside the Protest ===
A special town-hall–style discussion taking you inside the weekend of the 2010 G20 Summit in Toronto and the alleged force used by police and security.

=== MTV News Impact: Bullied To Death ===
A news special that looks into the recent deaths and suicides of those who are bullied, while also interviewing people at a protest against bullying. It originally aired October 24, 2010, at 6:00 pm ET.
