= Buzz (TV series) =

- Starring: Daryn Jones; Mista Mo (Morgan Smith)
- Country of origin: Canada
- Original language: English
- No. of seasons: 6
- No. of episodes: 78

Production
- Running time: 30 minutes

Original release
- Network: CTV Television Network
- Release: January 31, 2000 – April 29, 2005

Buzz was a Canadian comedy television series that aired on The Comedy Network from 2000 to 2005. The show was hosted by "Mista Mo" (Morgan Oliver Smith) and Daryn Jones. The show originally aired from 1996-1999 as a community channel show on Rogers Television before getting a network deal in 1999. In 2001, the show won a Gemini Award in the "Best Writing in a Comedy or Variety Program or Series" category. Season 4 saw them take the show to New York, London, Amsterdam and Frankfurt. The show ended in 2005.

Created in Toronto, the show found a place on the Comedy Network when The Tom Green Show left to MTV. The show uses sketch comedy, non-sequiturs and guerrilla comedy. The two hosts, Daryn Jones, a geeky theatre major, and Mista Mo, an "almost real rapper" often riff on the racial tensions between them.

== Recurring sketches and characters ==
- Annual Fat Pride Parade
- Selling Parked Cars
- Break Stuff - end-segment, where either hosts break items (TV's, eggs) or pedestrians battle each other
- The BuzzCops - Daryn and Mo, dressed as policemen, dole out misguided justice to Toronto's citizens.
- The BuzzNews - The Buzz's take on fake news (The Daily Show, Weekend Update)
- The Cable Access Painter - Daryn parodies PBS painter Bob Ross, with homosexual overtones.
- Captain Harassment - Features Daryn's left hand, clad in a rubber glove with a Canadian flag cape, sneaking up behind women, and pinching their asses.
- Country Mo Dee - Music videos of Mista Mo's alter-ego, a country hip-hop sensation.
- Thug Steel - Music videos of Mista Mo's alter-alter-ego, a gospel gangsta rap sensation.
- Fluff E. the Hip-Hop Bunny - Series regular Jean Paul dresses up as a giant pink bunny, to the glee of young children. But Fluff E. is more interested in their mothers.
- German Dinner Theatre - faux accents, poetry, keyboard and a mustache. Daryn, with Wesley Snipes (Mista Mo) and Big E (Eric Harze), insult the fashions of passers-by.
- Phone Sex Nursery Rhymes - Daryn and Mo dress up in animal costumes and make out with each other to nursery rhymes read by a phone sex operator.
- Shaboobala - making pedestrians uncomfortable by answering their relationship problems and then asking if he can marry them for a green card.
- Star Talk - usually unsuccessful attempts to speak with/insult celebrities
- Jesus: Caught on Tape - Amateur video of Jesus Christ committing various crimes, e.g. auto theft.
- Forgotten Black Superheroes - low-budget film trailers about black heroes like "Bootyman" and "The Bionic Slave" taking revenge on "crackas"
- "Ya Heard Me" - Mista Mo rants, Rick Mercer-style, about any ridiculous topic that comes to mind.
- Time of the Month Awards - end-segment, where Daryn and Mo hand out dubious awards, including "Best Bra in a Supporting Role" and "Best Ass in a Pair of Jeans" to female pedestrians.
- The Petitioners - Daryn and Mo get people to sign bogus petitions to change the names of things. They successfully changed popular hooker hang-out Jarvis St. to "Stan Khoe Ave.", the notoriously gay neighbourhood Church Street to "Lou Sass Blvd." and commended the cafeteria facilities at the Canadian Cancer Society by adding "And Grill" to the name.
- Bag TV - Run up from behind someone and as your passing them bag them and get it on camera for everyone to see.
- Workout With Shane Landers - A parody of 90s fitness segments starring comedian Gavin Stephens as overweight fitness instructor Shane Landers.
