= Sharlene Chiu =

Sharlene Chiu is a Canadian television reporter, host, and producer, most known as a reporter and producer on MTV News Canada, and the creator of Sharlene vs.

== Early days ==
Chiu graduated from Ryerson University's Radio and Television Arts program in 2005, where she studied broadcast journalism, documentary, and television production. She was awarded the John Webb Graham Q.C. Rogers Multicultural Scholarship, based on ethnocultural background, academic proficiency and career aspirations. While at Ryerson, Sharlene DJ'd a show on British music at the campus radio station.

== Career ==
=== MTV Live ===
Before starting MTV News Canada, Chiu helped launch MTV Canada in 2006, and worked behind-the-scenes as a segment producer for MTV Live. This included producing a music segment that ran on the show called On the Radar, where Sharlene established an exceptional reputation for selecting and featuring new independent bands.

=== MTV News ===
Chiu introduced MTV News to Canada as a weekly segment on the original hour-long version of MTV Live. The regular segment featured Chiu traveling around the world reporting on music trends and covering festivals such as SXSW, Austin City Limits, Osheaga, V Festival, and T in the Park. Her coverage from the South by Southwest and Austin City Limits festivals aired as half-hour specials on MTV Canada. Chiu has conducted in-depth interviews with over 250 artists, including Coldplay, Rihanna, Kings of Leon, Oasis, Pharrell Williams, Phoenix, Vampire Weekend, Mumford & Sons, Adele, The Strokes, Feist, Fucked Up, Wyclef Jean, and Cee Lo Green. Notably, Chiu's interview with M.I.A., during the release of Kala, where the artist had just returned from humanitarian work in Liberia and Australia, ran on multiple MTV networks including MTV Australia, Germany, UK, and Sweden. Chiu also memorably surprised Adele with a video message from her former BRIT School teacher, resulting in an emotional interview filled with tears and laughter.

=== Sharlene vs. ===
In February 2010, after winning the Travel Journalism Award presented by VisitBritain for her special, MTV News Pounds Britain, Chiu created Sharlene vs., an MTV News music travel series that takes viewers beyond where the tourists go. In each city, Chiu meets artists of all kinds from music to fashion to food who take Chiu under their helm, showing off unique, off-the-beaten-track spots that are uniquely special to them. Stick with Sharlene and you'll discover the inside tips that you can't find in any travel book. Cities explored included Copenhagen, Lyon, Austin, Hong Kong London, and Lisbon, and aired in prime-time on MTV Canada.
