= The MF Life =

Studio album by Melanie Fiona
- Released: March 20, 2012
- Recorded: 2010–12
- Genre: R&B
- Length: 52:25
- Labels: SRC, Title 9, Universal Republic
- Producers: No I.D.; Salaam Remi; Andrea Martin; Rico Love; Earl Hood; Eric Goudy II; Jack Splash; J.U.S.T.I.C.E. League; Los Da Mystro; Jay Fenix; Infinity; Antario "Tario" Holmes; Espionage; Sham & Motesart; T-Pain; Supa Dups; Soundz

Melanie Fiona chronology
The Bridge (2009)	The MF Life (2012)	Say Yes (2025)

Singles from The MF Life
- 1. "Gone and Never Coming Back" Released: January 11, 2011; 2. "4 AM" Released: September 6, 2011; 3. "This Time" Released: February 20, 2012; 4. "Wrong Side of a Love Song" Released: August 7, 2012

The MF Life is the second studio album by Canadian recording artist Melanie Fiona, released March 20, 2012, on Street Records Corporation, Title 9 Productions and Universal Republic Records. Production was handled by several record producers, including No I.D., Salaam Remi, Andrea Martin, Rico Love, Los Da Mystro and T-Pain, among others. Its music expands on the traditional R&B influences of Fiona's 2009 debut album, The Bridge, and its songs deal with themes of aggrievement, longing, and romantic triumph.

The album debuted at number seven on the Billboard 200, selling 34,000 copies in its first week. It produced four singles, including the R&B hit "4 AM". Upon its release, The MF Life received generally positive reviews from music critics, who commended its production, songwriting and Fiona's vocals. Fiona promoted it with a national tour throughout March 2012. As of May 2012, the album has sold 69,500 copies in the United States.

== Background and recording ==
After the shutdown of Universal Motown Records, Fiona was transferred to Universal Republic Records. In an interview with Gary Graff, she said that the delay in the album's release allowed her to reach out to rappers J. Cole and Nas to contribute to the songs "This Time" and "Running", respectively.

Recording sessions for the album took place at Glenwood Place Studios in Burbank, 4220 Feng Shui Studios in Los Angeles, Circle House Studios, The Hit Factory Criteria, and Body Music in Miami, Chevy Shack and Losta Studios in Atlanta, Summit Sound in New York, and The Armoury Vault in Toronto, Canada.

In a press release, Fiona explained the album's title, "the ‘MF’ in the album title represents my initials, but it also gets at the many facets of myself as an artist and a young woman. It can be viewed as the ‘Mighty Fine Life’ in times of triumph and success, but also the ‘Mother-F-ing Life’ when I'm dealing with frustration or misfortune. I celebrate both. I feel it would be dishonest if everything was all about glitz and glamour. It's about the balance of life, the yin and the yang, the good and the bad, all of that."

== Music and lyrics ==
According to Sarah Godfrey of The Washington Post, The MF Life expands on the traditional R&B influences of Fiona's debut album, with some songs Andy Kellman from AllMusic said delve into soft rock and classic soul influences. Songs such as "L.O.V.E." and "Watch Me Work" are styled in soul; the guitar-laden "Break Down These Walls" and "Wrong Side of a Love Song" have rock elements. "4 AM" draws on the hazy synth of Drake's "Marvins Room" and the emotional aesthetic of Alicia Keys' "Try Sleeping with a Broken Heart".

The album's lyrics deal with themes of longing, aggrievement, and romantic triumph. Music writers have noted Fiona's singing voice on the album as slightly husky and emotive.

== Release and promotion ==
The album's lead single, "Gone and Never Coming Back", peaked at number 37 on the US Billboard Hot R&B/Hip-Hop Songs. The second single, "4 AM", was sent to urban radio stations on August 30, 2011. It peaked at number eight on the Hot R&B/Hip-Hop Songs and number 81 on the Billboard Hot 100.

Originally scheduled for a 2011 release, The MF Life was released on March 20, 2012, on SRC and Universal Republic. Fiona promoted the album with a national tour throughout March 2012. It included dates at World Cafe Live in Philadelphia and the Austin Urban Music Festival in Texas.

When The MF Life was released, it sold 34,000 copies in its first week and debuted at number seven on the Billboard 200. It sold 16,200 copies in its second week on the chart. By May 2012, the album had sold 69,500 copies in the United States. In Switzerland, The MF Life charted for eight weeks and peaked at number 23. It also charted at number 32 on the United Kingdom's R&B Albums Chart.

== Critical reception ==
Professional ratings
Review scores
Source	Rating
AllMusic	4/5 stars
Entertainment Weekly	A−
Fact	3/5
Los Angeles Times	2.5/4 stars
Now	2/5
Rolling Stone	3.5/5 stars
USA Today	3/4 stars

The MF Life received generally positive reviews from critics. At Metacritic, which assigns a normalized rating out of 100 to reviews from mainstream critics, the album received an average score of 75, based on nine reviews. AllMusic editor Andy Kellman found Fiona "remarkably versatile when it comes to modes of expression" and stated, "The more beneficial mix of songwriting and production collaborators ... helps make The MF Life superior to the debut in every way." Entertainment Weekly felt the "slow-burning" songs remain her strength, while Jon Caramanica from The New York Times praised the production overall and stated, "Though this album lacks some of the intensity of her debut ... it still showcases Ms. Fiona ably." Ken Capobianco of The Boston Globe viewed the album as "a more fully realized and personal set of songs than her debut", writing that "she charts the vicissitudes of love with searing conviction and style ... she ratchets up the intensity, as she co-writes nearly all of the songs and often delivers them with stunning clarity and power." Rolling Stone writer Maura Johnston called her "multidimensional" and stated, "Big-name guests ... accentuate Fiona's strengths instead of overshadowing them, a testament to her supreme confidence."

In a mixed review, Kevin Ritchie of Now felt that The MF Life is "closer to a traditional multi-producer record featuring a checklist of styles ... that showcase her technical precision as a singer but reluctance to colour outside the lines." Los Angeles Times writer Ernest Hardy viewed that Fiona's "lapses into hard, hyper-emotive singing" make the content's emotion seem ingenuine and stated, "The songs are a bit stronger this time around, but few offer much in the way of great lyrics or real insight". Alex Macpherson of Fact called the album "occasionally transcendent" and commented that it "aims more to be a well-rounded work than a visionary one, and in that respect it succeeds admirably."

== Track listing ==
No.	Title	Writer(s)	Producer(s)	Length
1.	"Change the Record" (featuring B.o.B)	Hallim; Andrea Martin; Carlos McKinney; Bobby Simmons	Los Da Mystro	4:05
2.	"4 AM"	Richard Butler; Melanie Hallim; Earl Hood; Eric Goudy II	Rico Love; Earl Hood; Eric Goudy II	4:50
3.	"Break Down These Walls"	Austin; Wilson; Wyreman; Randolph	No I.D.	4:09
4.	"I Been That Girl"	Aubrey Drake Graham; Tyler Williams	T-Minus	2:53
5.	"Wrong Side of a Love Song"	Hallim; Matthew Kahane; George Soule	Jack Splash	4:28
6.	"Running" (featuring Nas)	Hallim; Nasir Jones; Salaam Remi Gibbs	Salaam Remi	5:29
7.	"This Time" (featuring J. Cole)	Johnta Austin; Ernest Wilson; Steve Wyreman; Kevin Randolph; Jermaine Cole	No I.D.	3:48
8.	"Gone and Never Coming Back"	Martin; Kevin Crowe; Erik Ortiz; K. Bartolomei	J.U.S.T.I.C.E. League	3:45
9.	"Bones"	Paloma Faith; Andre Merritt; Kahane	Jack Splash	3:53
10.	"Watch Me Work"	Hallim; Lindsay Fields; Nia Myricks; Jordan Suecof; Antario Holmes; Antoine Noegelen	Infinity; DayThree_Tario	3:25
11.	"Can’t Say I Never Loved You"	Martin; Espen Lind; Amund Gjorklund	Espionage	3:47
12.	"L.O.V.E." (duet with John Legend)	Hallim; John Stephens; Wilson; Wyreman; Randolph	No I.D.	3:55
13.	"6 AM" (featuring T-Pain) (bonus track)	Hallim; Faheem Najm; Donald Cook; Jon A. Gordon; Michael A. Gordon	The Gordon Brothers; T-Pain	4:13

Digital bonus track
No.	Title	Writer(s)	Producer(s)	Length
14.	"Gone (La Dada Di)" (featuring Snoop Dogg)	Shanell Woodgett; Kenneth Coby; Calvin Broadus	Soundz	3:36

Deluxe edition bonus tracks
No.	Title	Writer(s)	Producer(s)	Length
14.	"Rock Paper Scissors"	Ginette Claudette; Eritza Laus; Cannon Mapp; Hasham Hussein; Denarius Motes	Sham & Motesart
15.	"Can't Do This No More"	Hallim; Martin; Kahane	Jack Splash
16.	"What Am I to Do"	Hallim; Martin; Kahane	Jack Splash
17.	"Like I Love You"	Hallim; Stacy Barthe; Luke Boyd; Jason Gilbert; Dwayne Chin-Quee; Mitchum Chin	Dwayne "Supa Dups" Chin-Quee

== Personnel ==
Credits for The MF Life adapted from liner notes.

- Johntá Austin – background vocals
- Diego Avendaño – engineer
- B.o.B – featured artist
- Bobby Brass – assistant engineer, end chorus, engineer
- Myisha Brooks – publicity
- Sandy Brummels – art direction
- Los DaMystro – conductor, producer
- Gleyder "Gee" Disla – engineer
- E – producer
- Kirk Edwards – photography
- Espionage – musician, producer
- Jay Fenix – musician, producer
- Melanie Fiona – art direction, primary artist
- Elizabeth Gallardo – assistant engineer
- Eric Goudy II – keyboards, programming
- Skye Griffin – background vocals
- George Gumbs – vocal engineer
- Tiara Hargrave – publicity
- Chuck Harmony – additional music, additional production
- Vincent Henry – guitar, saxophone
- Melantha Hodge – marketing
- Antario Holmes – keyboards, producer
- Earl Hood – keyboards, programming
- Diallobe Johnson – marketing
- Rob Kinelski – engineer, mixing
- Jason "Chyld" Kpana – A&R
- Cameron Krone – photography
- John Legend – featured artist
- Espen Lind – engineer
- Rico Love – background vocals, composer, producer
- Omar Loya – assistant engineer
- Victor Mancusi – assistant engineer, end chorus, engineer, mixing
- Fabian Marasciullo – mixing
- Rob Marks – mixing
- Manny Marroquin – mixing
- Andrea Martin – associate producer, background vocals, producer, vocal producer
- Sean McCoy – mixing assistant
- Pierre Medor – engineer
- Vlado Meller – mastering
- Ian Mercel – engineer
- Michael Michel – A&R, producer
- Carmen Murray – A&R, art direction, producer, stylist
- Francis Murray – engineer
- F. Najm – composer
- Nas – featured artist
- Scott Naughton – engineer
- Tiffany Naval – art direction
- No Id – producer, vocals
- K. Randolph – composer
- Kevin Randolph – keyboards
- Salaam Remi – arranger, bass, drums, guitar, keyboards, producer
- Tony Reyes – bass, guitar
- Steve Rifkind – producer
- Gillian Russell – A&R
- Gennaro Schiano – mixing assistant
- Lynn Scott – marketing
- Noah Shebib – vocal producer
- Jack Splash – engineer, mixing, musician, producer
- Jordan Suecof – percussion, producer, programming
- T-Pain – composer, featured artist, producer
- T-Minus – producer
- Javier Valverde – vocal engineer
- Martha Violante – stylist
- James Wisner – mixing
- Steve Wyreman – bass, composer, guitar

== Charts ==
=== Weekly charts ===
Chart (2012)	Peak position
Swiss Albums (Schweizer Hitparade)	23
UK R&B Albums (Official Charts)	32
Canadian Albums (Billboard)	64
US Billboard 200	7
US Top R&B/Hip-Hop Albums (Billboard)	1

=== Year-end charts ===
Chart (2012)	Position
US Top R&B/Hip-Hop Albums (Billboard)	45
