= It Kills Me =

Single by Melanie Fiona

from the album The Bridge
- Released: July 22, 2009
- Recorded: 2006/2007–2008
- Genre: R&B, soul
- Length: 4:10
- Songwriters: Andrea Martin; Robert Littlejohn Jr.; Leon Carr; Earl Shulman; Gerell Brewer
- Producers: Jay Fenix; Andrea Martin

Melanie Fiona singles chronology
"Give It to Me Right" (2009)	"It Kills Me" (2009)	"Bang Bang" (2009)

Music video
- "It Kills Me" Video on YouTube

"It Kills Me" is a song recorded by Melanie Fiona and released as the second single from The Bridge. It was written by Andrea Martin, Robert Littlejohn Jr., Leon Carr, Earl Shulman, and Gerell Brewer, and produced by Jay Fenix & Andrea Martin. The track spent nine weeks as number-one on the US Billboard R&B singles chart. The track also peaked just outside the Top 40 on the Billboard Hot 100, peaking at 43. Fiona received a Grammy nomination in the category of Best Female R&B Vocal Performance for the track, however, the Grammy was awarded to Beyoncé for "Single Ladies (Put a Ring on It)". The song samples "(Hey There) Lonely Girl" by The Softones.

The official remix features rapper Ghostface Killah.

== Music video ==
The music video, "It Kills Me", was directed by Armen Djerrahian in 2009 and features Adam Rodriguez as Melanie's love interest.

== Charts ==
=== Weekly charts ===
Weekly chart performance
Chart (2010)	Peak position
Canada CHR/Top 40 (Billboard)	39
US Billboard Hot 100	43
US Hot R&B/Hip-Hop Songs (Billboard)	1
US Adult R&B Songs (Billboard)	1

=== Year-end charts ===
Annual chart rankings
Chart (2010)	Position
US Adult R&B Songs (Billboard)	11
US Hot R&B/Hip-Hop Songs (Billboard)	3
US Radio Songs (Billboard)	66

== Certifications ==
Region	Certification	Certified units/sales
United States (RIAA)	Platinum	1,000,000^{‡}
^{‡} Sales+streaming figures based on certification alone.

== See also ==
- List of R&B number-one singles of 2010 (U.S.)
