= Steve Rifkind =

American music entrepreneur (born 1962)

- Born: Steven Rifkind; March 2, 1962 (age 64); Merrick, New York, U.S.
- Genre: Hip hop
- Occupations: Record executive; entrepreneur; investor
- Years active: 1969–present
- Labels: Loud; SRC

Steven Rifkind (born March 2, 1962) is an American music entrepreneur. He is the founder and chairman of Loud Records and SRC Records. He is associated with artists such as Wu Tang Clan, Mobb Deep, Akon, David Banner, Asher Roth, Joell Ortiz, and Big Pun. Rifkind has also launched marketing campaigns for companies such as T-Mobile, Adidas, SanDisk, Nike, Pepsi, Levi Jeans, and Starter. According to XXL magazine, he is "responsible for breaking in some of hip-hop's biggest artists in his 25 years in the business".

== Life and career ==
=== Origins ===
The son of record producer Jules Rifkind, growing up in Merrick, Long Island, Rifkind had an early affinity for R&B and hip hop music. In the 1960s and 1970s, the elder Rifkind managed Spring Records, whose clients included James Brown and Millie Jackson. In his youth, Rifkind worked for his father at Spring, even working as a promotion man on "King Tim III (Personality Jock)" by the FatBack Band in 1979, widely regarded as the first rap song ever recorded (it beat Sugarhill Gang's Rapper's Delight into record stores by weeks). After leaving Spring Records, Rifkind relocated to Los Angeles where he managed the R&B group New Edition from 1986 to 1988..

=== Loud Records ===
As the founder and CEO of Loud Records, which was established in 1991, Rifkind helped the bi-coastal hip-hop label focus on "street-themed" hip-hop. Loud was influential in launching the careers of several hip-hop stars in the early and mid-1990s; most notably Wu-Tang Clan, Mobb Deep, Three 6 Mafia, and Big Pun. At Loud, Rifkind supplemented his artists' success with branding and cross-promotions. Loud's holdings included a film division and a clothing line.

Loud's success led to Rifkind selling 50% of the company to RCA in 1996. In July 1999, Loud moved to Sony. Loud launched its film division in 1999, signing a multi-year pact with Dimension/Miramax. Loud Film's first and only project, Paid in Full (a film on which Brett Ratner, Jay-Z, and Damon Dash were partners with Rifkind) was released in 2002.

=== The new millennium ===
Today, Rifkind is still deeply involved in the hip-hop and R&B world. After losing the Loud Records name after its being sold to Sony in 2002, Rifkind started Street Records Corporation (a second SRC). Early artist signings included David Banner, as well as R&B singer Akon. In 2003, Rifkind joined the Universal/Motown Records group as vice president.

In 2007, Rifkind acquired limited rights to the Loud Records name from Sony and released Wu-Tang Clan's 8 Diagrams under the Loud banner.

Along with operating SRC, and his ever-expanding roster of corporate clients, Rifkind's latest ventures include investments in Coalition Music Group, a Reggaeton label, as well in Kid's Block, an educational DVD series for children, featuring music by the Trackmasters production team. 2008 saw the foundation of the Rifkind Thal Group (RTG), a technology marketing company. Its first client was SanDisk, a data-storage products developer and manufacturer.

=== The Street Team Concept ===
The Street Team promotional model, as pioneered by Rifkind, is based on the simple principle of word-of-mouth advertising coupled with the touchstones of what makes for "urban cool". The Street Team is fundamentally based on knowledge of the urban subculture on the part of the marketer and what potential consumers relate to. "Nobody should put out a record before they know what the street thinks".

== Personal life ==
Rifkind is involved in several philanthropic activities. Camp Excel, founded in 1996 with a childhood friend, psychologist Dr. Gary Altheim, is a week-long overnight camp for underprivileged children struggling with learning disabilities. Rifkind is also a sponsor of breast cancer charities, donating the profits from his Think Pink Rocks concerts to support breast cancer research and treatment. The first Think Pink Rocks event in September 2008 was hosted by Queen Latifah and featured several SRC Records artists.

Rifkind also sponsors and coaches the Delray Blazers, his son Alex's youth basketball team, in Delray Beach, Florida. They won an Amateur Athletic Union Florida state championship in 2008. Around this time Rifkind served as a godfather to Sammis Reyes, a student-athlete from Chile who would later become the first Chilean to play in the National Football League (NFL).
