= Nicole Holness =

Canadian television host and R&B singer

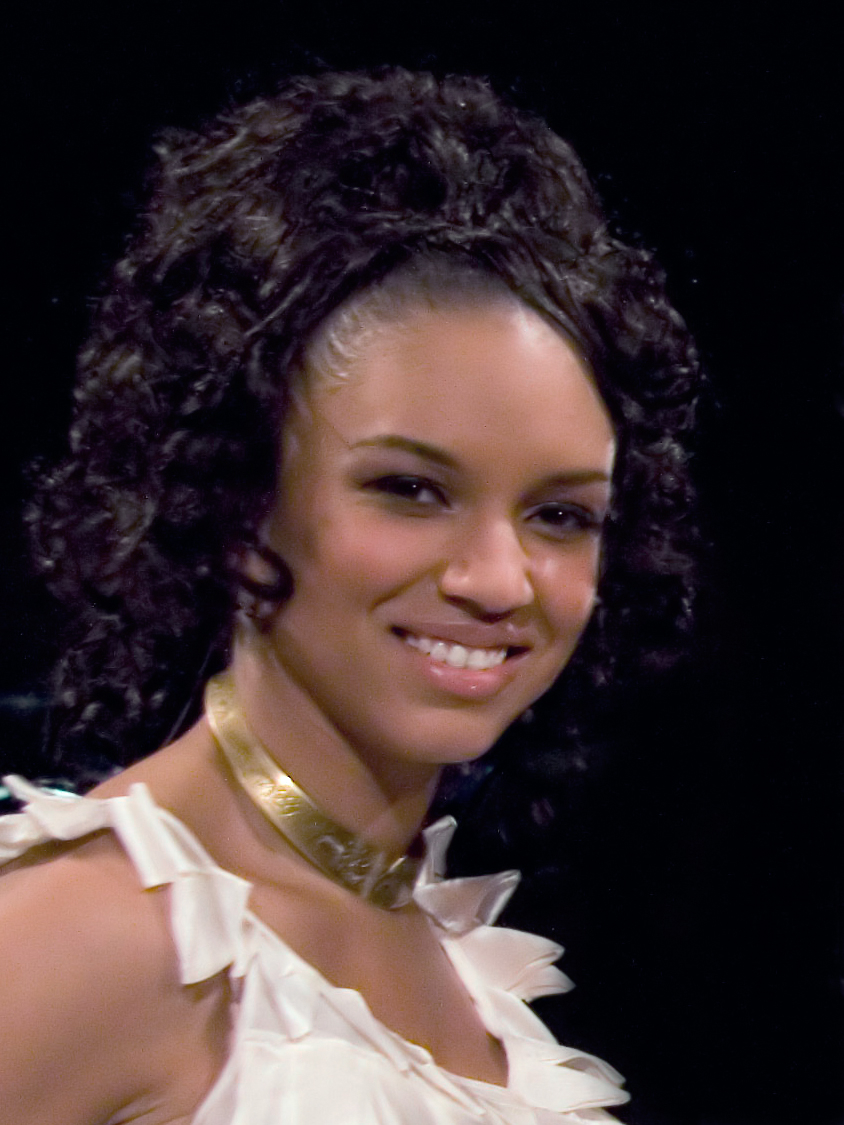
- Holness on MTV Live in December 2008.
- Born: April 13, 1984 (age 42); Toronto, Ontario, Canada
- Occupations: Singer, TV host
- Years active: 2002–present

Nicole Holness (born April 13, 1984) is a Canadian television host and R&B singer. Between 2002 and 2005, she was part of the girl group X-Quisite alongside Melanie Fiona and Nirvana Savoury.

== Early life ==
Born in Toronto, Holness is of Guyanese, Indigenous Canadian, Scottish and West Indian background. She is fluent in French and attended Cedarbrae Collegiate Institute. She has experience in ballet and jazz dance.

== Career ==
=== X-Quisite ===
In 2002, Holness became part the R&B girl group X-Quisite alongside Melanie Fiona and Nirvana Savoury. Signed to Warner Music Canada, the group released their self-titled debut studio album in 2003. For the 2004 Juno Awards, the band was nominated for "R&B/Soul Recording of the Year" for the album X-Quisite. The group disbanded in 2005.

=== Television hosting ===
In 2006, Holness was chosen as one of the original seven co-hosts of MTV Canada and their flagship series MTV Live. Holness co-hosted MTV Live alongside host Paul Lemieux, Sheena Snively, and Dave Merheje.

=== Solo career ===
On March 1, 2011, Holness released her debut album Unreleased. The album was preceded by her debut single, "Epic", which was released May 5, 2009. A second single "Pop Yo Bottles" was released on June 29, 2010.

== Discography ==
=== Albums ===
in X-Quisite

- 2002: X-Quisite (for details and track list, see X-Quisite)

Solo

- 2011: Unreleased

=== Singles ===
in X-Qusite

- "Bad Girl" (2004)
- "No Regrets"

Solo

- 2009: "Epic"
- 2010: "Pop Yo Bottles"

== Sources ==
- http://www.openingday.com/ X-Quisite's label
- Article title
- http://www.muchmusic.com/music/artists/index.asp?artist=312
- http://www.treymills.com/treymills.swf
- Mihsin, Andre (2004-02-12). "Juno Nominees Chit-Chat: X-Quisite Look Forward To Hitting West Edmonton Mall". Chart. Archived from the original on June 7, 2011.
- http://www.myspace.com/officialxquisite
- http://mtvnicole.mtvblogs.ca/default.asp?item=166025
