= The Bridge (Melanie Fiona album) =

Studio album by Melanie Fiona
- Released: June 23, 2009
- Recorded: 2008–2009
- Genres: R&B, soul
- Length: 45:06
- Labels: SRC, Title 9, Universal Motown
- Producers: Melanie Fiona; Andrea Martin; Rob Fusari; Peter Wade Keusch; Sidh Solanki; Vada Nobles; Bill Blast; Future Cut; Stereotypes; Dan Strong; JK; Jay Fenix; Affiliate

Melanie Fiona chronology
The Bridge (2009)	The MF Life (2012)

Singles from The Bridge
- 1. "Give It to Me Right" Released: February 28, 2009; 2. "It Kills Me" Released: July 22, 2009; 3. "Bang Bang" Released: October 18, 2009; 4. "Monday Morning" Released: October 25, 2009; 5. "Ay Yo" Released: April 17, 2010; 6. "Priceless" Released: April 2010

The Bridge is the debut album of Canadian R&B/soul singer Melanie Fiona, released by Street Records Corporation, Title 9 Productions and Universal Motown Records on June 23, 2009. It was released in the United States on June 23, 2009. The album debuted at number four on the Billboard Top R&B/Hip-Hop Albums chart and at number 57 on the Billboard 200 chart, where it later peaked at number 27. The album received generally favorable reviews. As of February 2012, the album has sold 450,000 copies in the United States.

== Background ==
The album is a mixture of soul, R&B, neo soul, reggae and hip hop music influenced by pop music. In an interview, Fiona described the album's sound as "pop soul". On the album, she worked with Andrea Martin, Rob Fusari, Peter Wade Keusch, Sidh Solanki, Vada Nobles, Bill Blast, Future Cut, Stereotypes, Dan Strong, JK, Jay Fenix, Affiliate.

== Reception ==
Professional ratings
Review scores
Source	Rating
About.com	3.5/5 stars
AllMusic	3/5 stars
Hot Press	(favorable)
The Observer	(mixed)
Planet Sound	(7/10)
Shields Gazette	(8/10)
Sunday Mercury	(favorable)
The Couch Sessions	4/5 stars

The Bridge has received generally positive reviews from music critics. Edwin McFee of Hot Press called the album "an intelligent homage to ‘60s Motown, sampling soul classics while putting her own unique stamp on things". Allmusic's Matthew Chisling gave it 3 out of 5 stars and wrote that "where it does go, it goes masterfully", concerning its sound. Despite noting a weakness in the album's cohesiveness, Mark Edward Nero of About.com wrote favorably of the album's production and commended Fiona for her vocal ability. "It Kills Me" was nominated for the Grammy Award for Best Female R&B Vocal Performance.

== Singles ==
"Give It to Me Right" was the first official single from The Bridge. The song peaked at number 41 in the UK but failed to chart on the Billboard Hot 100 in the US. It did, however, reach number 57 on the US Billboard Hot R&B/Hip-Hop Songs chart.

"It Kills Me" was Fiona's first entry on the Billboard Hot 100, charting at number 43. The single was the second from the album in the US and charted at number one on the US R&B chart. It was released in Canada as the third single from the album and was released as the third single in the UK on June 14, 2010.

"Bang Bang" was sent to radio in the UK and Canada as the second single for top 40 and hot adult contemporary radio stations.

"Monday Morning" charted in Switzerland and Poland at number one and in Austria at number five. It was released as the third US single (however, "Bang Bang" was sent to radio as the second Canadian single for Canadian top 40 & hot AC play), but due to "Priceless" not being released in Canada, "Monday Morning" served as the fifth single in Canada due to hot adult contemporary radio station CKZZ-FM (Virgin Radio 953) in Vancouver having the song on its playlist.

"Ay Yo" was released as the fourth official single from The Bridge, according to Fiona's website and Twitter. The music video premiered on April 12, 2010.

"Priceless" was the fifth US single due to airplay on urban adult contemporary stations. Due to "Priceless" not being released in Canada, "Monday Morning" was serviced to Canadian stations as the fifth single, even though "Monday Morning" was released as the third American single.

=== Promotional singles and other songs ===
"Sad Songs" was released in April 2009 in the UK only as a digital download, with the reggae-tinged songs "Somebody Come Get Me" and "Island Boy" as B-sides. "Sad Songs" did not chart in the UK.

"You Stop My Heart" was released as a promotional single to coincide with Valentine's Day. The music video was released on Valentine's Day, 2010.

A music video was also released for "Bang Bang", and the song was used as the second Canadian single. The song was featured in an episode of ABC's Ugly Betty.

== Track listing ==
No.	Title	Writer(s)	Producer(s)	Length
1.	"Give It to Me Right"	Andrea Martin; Rod Argent	Martin; Argent	3:43
2.	"Bang Bang"	Rob Fusari; Angela Hunte; Janet Sewell-Ulepić	Fusari	3:28
3.	"Monday Morning"	Charlene Gilliam; Peter Wade Keusch; Sidh Solanski	Keusch; Solanski	3:38
4.	"Please Don’t Go (Cry Baby)"	Bill Blast; Alisha "Mjestie" Brooks; Holland–Dozier–Holland	Blast; Vada Nobles	3:15
5.	"Ay Yo"	Martin; Iyiola Babalola; Melanie Fiona Hallim; Darren Lewis; Allen Toussaint	Future Cut	3:18
6.	"Walk On By"	Martin; Don Davis	Martin	3:31
7.	"You Stop My Heart"	Martin; Babalola; Lewis; Ed Marshall	Future Cut	3:46
8.	"Johnny"	Hallim; Philip Lawrence; Bruno Mars; Jeremy Reeves; Ray Romulus; Jonathan Yip	The Stereotypes	3:42
9.	"Sad Songs"	Gene Allen; Diana Bovell; John Myatt; Bobby Vinton	Martin	4:38
10.	"Priceless"	Raymond Angry; Claude Kelly; Dan Wilenski	Joel "JK" Kipnis; Dan Strong	3:47
11.	"It Kills Me"	Martin; Leon Carr; Robert Littlejohn Jr.; Melvin "Melomuzic Parker"; Earl Shuman	Jay Fenix; Martin	4:10
12.	"Teach Him"	Martin; Diego Baliardo; Paco Baliardo; Tonino Baliardo; André Reyes; Canut Reyes; Nicolas Reyes	Martin	4:10

International bonus track
No.	Title	Length
13.	"G.A.M."	2:50

Switzerland bonus track
No.	Title	Length
13.	"Give It to Me Right" (The Remix) (featuring Stress)	3:59

Samples

- "Time of the Season" by The Zombies on Give It to Me Right
- "Jimmy Mack" by Martha and the Vandellas on Please Don't Go (Cry Baby)
- "Tampin'" by The Rhine Oaks on Ay Yo
- "I Believe in You (You Believe in Me)" by Johnnie Taylor on Walk On By
- "Venus" by Frankie Avalon on You Stop My Heart
- "Mr. Lonely" by Bobby Vinton & "Silly Games" by Janet Kay on Sad Songs
- "Hey There Lonely Girl" by The Softones on It Kills Me
- "No Volveré" by Gipsy Kings on Teach Him

== Charts ==
=== Weekly charts ===
Chart (2009–2010)	Peak position
Canadian Albums (Billboard	25
German Albums (Offizielle Top 100)	35
Italian Albums (FIMI)	61
Swedish Albums (Sverigetopplistan)	22
Swiss Albums (Schweizer Hitparade)	3
UK Albums (Official Charts)	98
UK Album Downloads (Official Charts)	38
UK R&B Albums (Official Charts)	11
US Billboard 200	27
US Top R&B/Hip-Hop Albums (Billboard)	4

=== Year-end charts ===
Chart (2009)	Position
Swiss Albums (Schweizer Hitparade)	99
Chart (2010)	Position
Swiss Albums (Schweizer Hitparade)	43
US Billboard 200	117
US Top R&B/Hip-Hop Albums (Billboard)	29

== Personnel ==
- Melanie Fiona – vocals

=== Technical personnel ===
- Andrea Martin – producer on tracks 1, 6, 9, 11–12
- Rob Fusari – producer on track 2
- Peter Wade Keusch – producer on track 3
- Sidh Solanki – producer on track 3
- Vada Nobles – producer on track 4
- Bill Blast – producer on track 4
- Future Cut – producer on tracks 5, 7 and 13
- Stereotypes – producer on track 8
- Dan Strong – producer on track 10
- JK – producer on track 10
- Jay Fenix – producer on track 11
- Affiliate – producer on track 11

== Release history ==
Region	Date
Italy	June 26, 2009
Canada	June 30, 2009
United Kingdom	July 20, 2009
United States	June 23, 2009
