= Melanie Fiona =

Canadian singer (born 1983)

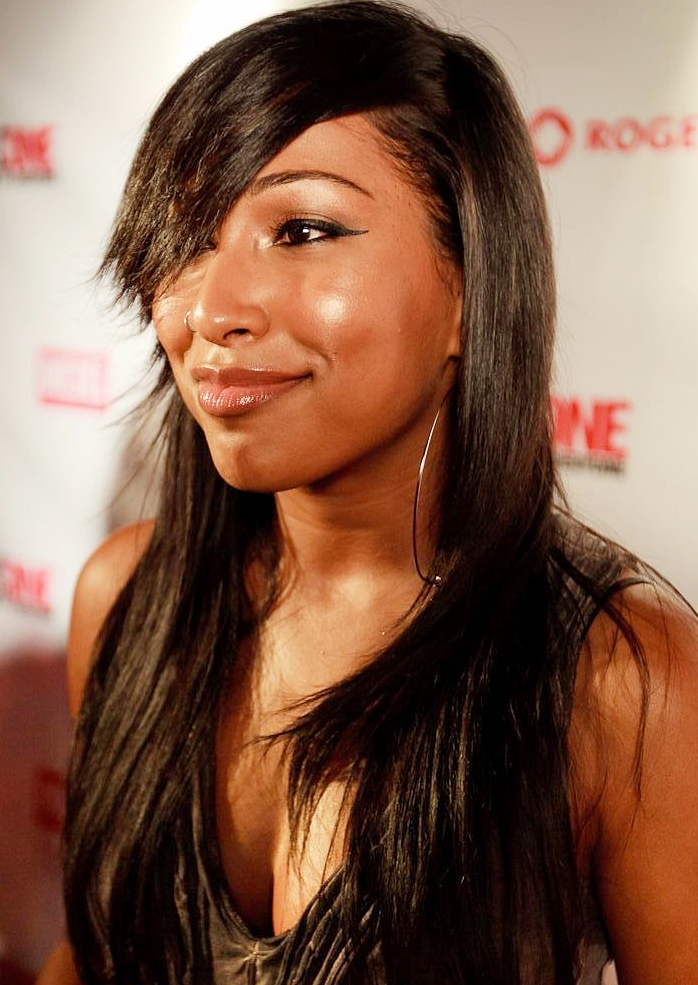
- Fiona in 2011

Background information
- Also known as: Syren Hall
- Born: Melanie Fiona Hallim; July 4, 1983 (age 43); Toronto, Ontario, Canada
- Genres: R&B; soul
- Occupation: Singer
- Years active: 2002–present
- Labels: Roc Nation; SRC; Universal Motown; Universal Republic
- Formerly of: The Renaissance; X-Quisite
- Spouse: Jared Cotter (m. 2020)
- Website: www.melaniefiona.com

Melanie Fiona Hallim (born July 4, 1983) is a Canadian R&B singer. Born and raised in Toronto, she began her career in 2002 as part of a Canadian R&B trio X-Quisite, who was nominated for a Juno Award for R&B/Soul Recording of the Year for their self-titled album (2004). She went on to form the duo the Renaissance with hometown native Drake, although they released no albums.

Fiona's debut album The Bridge (2009) was preceded by her debut single, "Give It to Me Right" which peaked at number 20 on the Canadian Hot 100 chart and number 41 on the UK Singles Chart. Her follow-up single, "It Kills Me," became her breakout song on the US Billboard Hot 100 where it peaked at number 43 while topping the Hot R&B/Hip-Hop Songs chart, and earned her a Grammy Award nomination for Best Female R&B Vocal Performance. Her next single "Monday Morning" became her biggest hit in Europe. The Bridge also earned her an NAACP Image Award nomination for Outstanding New Artist.

Fiona's second studio album, The MF Life (2012), peaked at number 7 on the US Billboard 200. The same year, Fiona won two Grammy Awards for Best Traditional R&B Performance and Best R&B Song for her song "Fool for You" with CeeLo Green.

== Life and career ==
=== 1983–2006: Early life and career beginnings ===
Melanie Fiona Hallim was born on July 4, 1983, in Toronto, Ontario, Canada. She is the daughter and second child of Guyanese immigrant parents, who immigrated to Canada in the late 1970s. Her parents are of Afro-Guyanese, Indo-Guyanese, and Portuguese descent. Her father was a janitor before working in finance, and her mother worked in banking. Fiona began writing songs at age 16. Living in a music-filled household, Fiona says she always knew music was her passion. Her father was a guitarist in a band and would allow her to sit on the stage when she was younger as he would play. In 2002, Fiona was part of a girl group called X-Quisite alongside Nicole Holness and Nirvana Savoury. Signed to Warner Music Canada, the group released their self-titled debut studio album X-Quisite in 2003. At the 2004 Juno Awards, the group was nominated as one of five finalists for R&B/Soul Recording of the Year for the album X-Quisite. The group had a number of singles from the album, notably "Bad Girl" and "No Regrets". The group disbanded in 2005.

She was also in a group called the Renaissance with rapper Drake. Early in her career, she would perform at nightclubs in Toronto. In 2005, Fiona traveled to Los Angeles, in search of a recording contract. According to Fiona, record labels "loved" the way she looked and sung, but she "knew that the minute I worked with them or would have signed with them, they would have tried to change me into someone else completely different. That was something that I didn't want to do." She went on to co-write songs for recording artists Rihanna and Kardinal Offishall, working with, amongst others, super producer Mike City. Fiona also recorded the reggae song "Somebody Come Get Me" under the stage name Syren Hall, which was included in the Reggae Gold 2008 compilation album.

=== 2007–2010: The Bridge ===
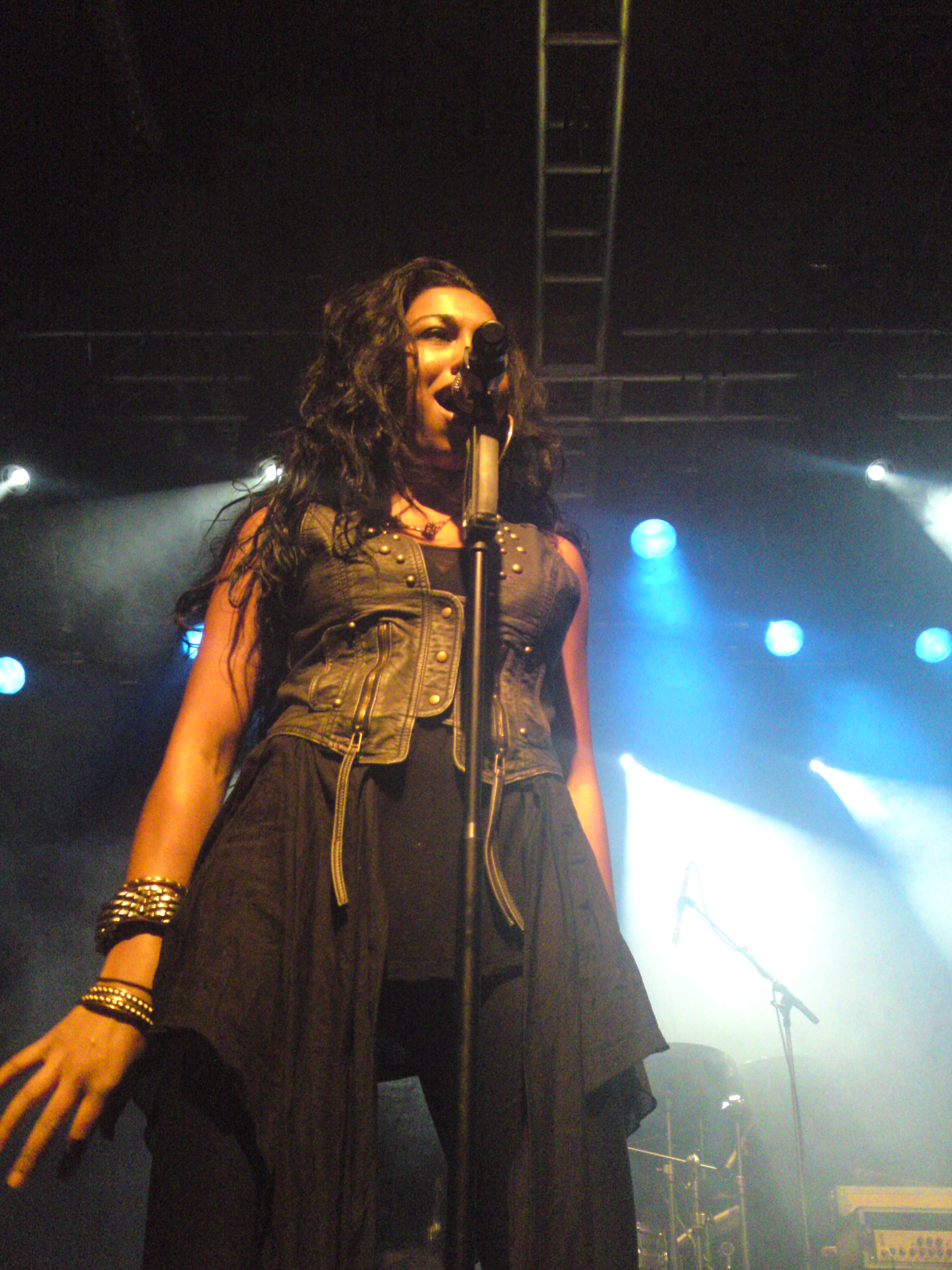
Fiona performing in Bern, Switzerland at the club Bierhübeli in 2009

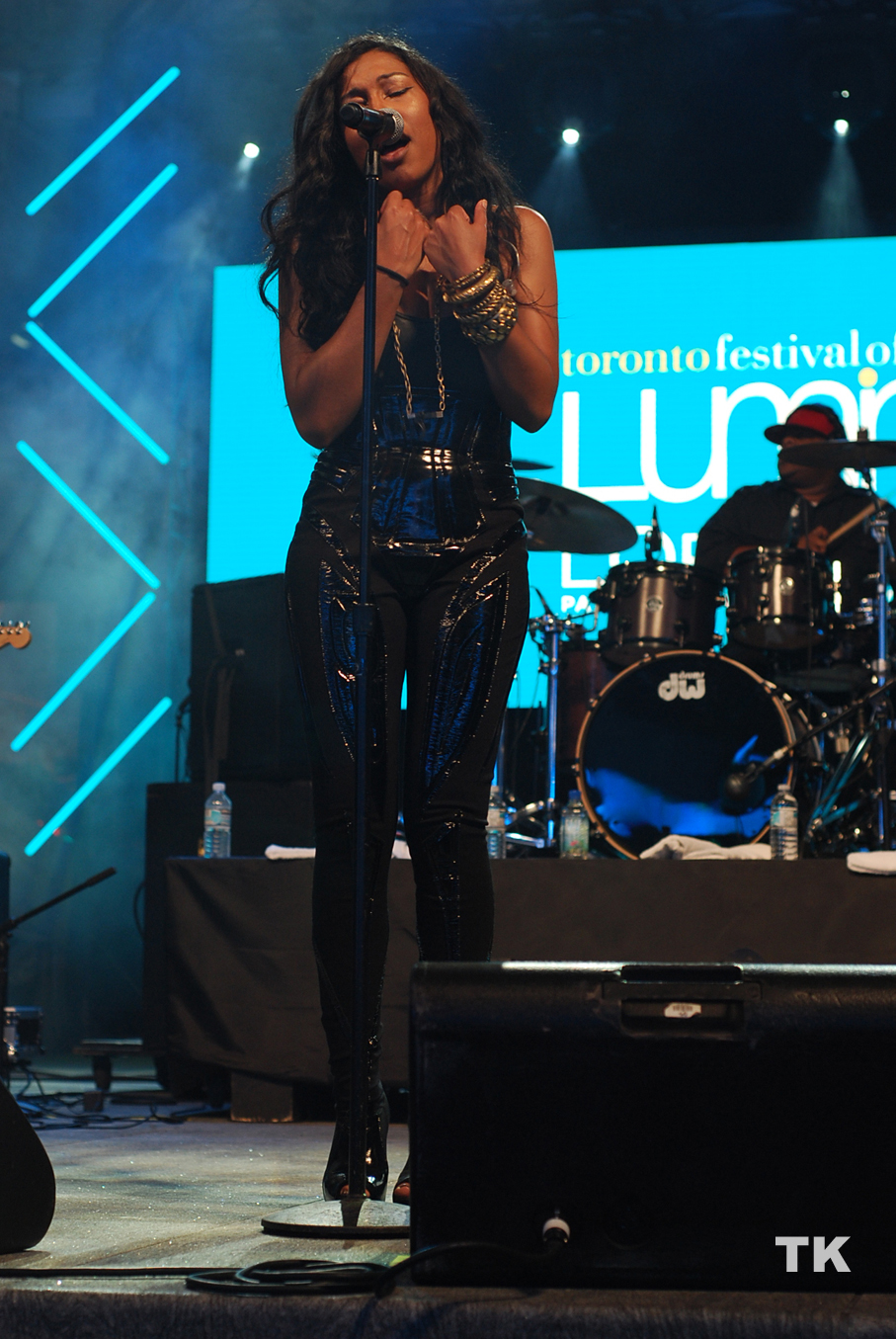
Fiona performing live at Luminato in 2010

Entrepreneur Steve Rifkind discovered and signed Fiona to SRC Records and Universal Motown through Title 9 Productions in 2007. She went on to tour with Kanye West in his Glow in the Dark Tour Prior to completing her debut album, Fiona met with recording artist Jay-Z and his friend Tyty. She played them some of her music and was then signed to be managed by Roc Nation. She released her debut album, The Bridge, in June 2009, which has sold 248,000 copies in the United States. Beyond Race Magazine ranked Fiona among "50 Emerging Artists" of 2009. Several singles were released from the album, including "It Kills Me", which topped the Billboard Hot R&B/Hip-Hop Songs chart for 10 weeks and earned her a Grammy Award nomination at the 52nd Grammy Awards for Best Female R&B Vocal Performance. Other singles that were released were "Sad Songs" was released in April 2009 in the UK only as a digital download, with the reggae-tinged songs "Somebody Come Get Me" and "Island Boy" as B-sides. "Sad Songs" did not chart in the UK. "Give It to Me Right" was the first official single from The Bridge. The song peaked at No. 41 in the UK but failed to chart on the Billboard Hot 100 in the US. It did, however, reach No. 57 on the U.S. Billboard Hot R&B/Hip-Hop Songs chart.

"Monday Morning" charted in Switzerland and Poland at number 1 and in Austria at number 5. It was released as the third U.S. single, however, "Bang Bang" was sent to radio as the second Canadian single for Canadian top 40 & hot AC play. Due to "Priceless" not being released in Canada, "Monday Morning" served as the fifth single in Canada, due to hot adult contemporary radio station CKZZ-FM (Virgin Radio 953) in Vancouver having the song on its playlist. "Ay Yo" was released as the fourth official single from The Bridge, according to Fiona's website and Twitter. The music video for the song premiered on April 12, 2010. "Priceless" would be the fifth U.S. single, due to airplay on urban adult contemporary stations. Due to "Priceless" not being released in Canada, "Monday Morning" was released to Canadian stations as the fifth single, even though "Monday Morning" appeared as the third American single. The album spawned six singles including "It Kills Me", which landed at number 47 on the top 100 charts and reached the top spot on US R&B chart.

Fiona participated in "We Are the World 25 for Haiti" to benefit after the 2010 Haiti earthquake. She also began touring with Alicia Keys as an opening act on The Freedom Tour in 2010.

=== 2011–2018: The MF Life and scrapped Awake album ===
In 2011, Fiona began recording her second studio album. The lead single was titled "Gone and Never Coming Back." It peaked at 37 on the US R&B chart becoming her second highest-peaking song on the R&B chart so far. Later on that year, Fiona released her second single, "4 AM", which was sent to urban stations on August 30, 2011. "4 AM", a song about a lover who had gone out and was cheating on her, peaked on the US R&B chart at No. 8. It also made the top 100 charts. Fiona's album, The MF Life, was released on March 20, 2012.

On January 2, 2012, she performed "O Canada" at the NHL Winter Classic between the New York Rangers and Philadelphia Flyers at Citizens Bank Park.

As a newly independent artist, Fiona announced she was working on her third album Awake in October 2013. During this time, she released the single "Cold Piece". On May 12, 2015, she premiered a new song and lyric video "Bite the Bullet", which was set to appear on her new album in 2016. "I feel like sometimes people know my songs but haven't gotten the opportunity to know me" Fiona told the VIBE. "I want to make people feel good and I want people to feel that they are not alone, that this album and me as an artist represent a voice for people to feel like 'Yeah, that is the life we're living and we're living it together so let's do our part to move forward positively, and do some really great things while we are alive here" she added. In September 2015, Fiona announced two more tracks for the album: "I Tried" – the first song written for the album, and "Killing Time", which she wrote after a break up with her boyfriend. It was later announced in a 2019 Instagram post that the Awake album was scrapped.

=== 2024–present: Say Yes ===
On October 25, 2024, Fiona released the songs "Say Yes" and "I Choose You" as the double lead single for her extended play Say Yes, which was released in April 2025. The former song was produced by Andre Harris and co-written with singer-songwriter SiR, who also provides backing vocals.

== Personal life ==
Fiona and songwriter Jared Cotter have a son born on 14 March 2016. They became engaged on 14 February 2018. Originally they planned to marry on Amalfi Coast, Italy; but the COVID-19 pandemic forced them to postpone their wedding three times. The couple married privately on 12 December 2020 in Los Angeles. They welcomed a daughter in December 2021.

== Artistry ==
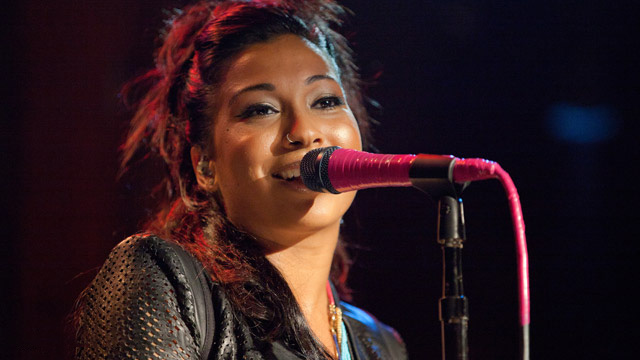
Fiona at Walmart Soundcheck in 2012

=== Voice ===
Fiona is a dramatic soprano. Her voice has been referred to as being both "soulful" and "sassy". Some have praised her vocals for being "very passionate, but clean and controlled, and not over-the-top singing".

=== Musical style and influences ===
Fiona cites The Ronettes, Whitney Houston, Michael Jackson, Mariah Carey, Christina Aguilera, Sam Cooke, Sade, The Supremes, Amy Winehouse, India Arie, Patsy Cline, Bob Marley, and Beyoncé as her musical influences. Furthermore, she mentioned Brandy Norwood as a major inspiration, naming her the only artist that had her starstruck next to Prince. She also cited Janet Jackson's career as inspirational, who she called an icon. She called Lauryn Hill's The Miseducation of Lauryn Hill the album that changed her perspective, calling it an "amazing body of work". She attributes her parents for her vintage sound. Her father was a guitarist in a band, while her mother would sing around the house. She explained that "[m]y parents were big music lovers and played soul music all the time", who would play the Supremes, the Ronettes and Cooke, as well as Caribbean music like soca, calypso and reggae.

Fiona's occasional songwriting revolves around her personal experiences. She stated that she attempts to "keep [the songs] as universal as possible, unless I am writing about something very personal, even then the themes are universal". She has received comparisons to Amy Winehouse, Lauryn Hill, Macy Gray, Chrisette Michele, Marsha Ambrosius and Jill Scott.

== Discography ==
- The Bridge (2009)
- The MF Life (2012)

== Awards and nominations ==
BET Awards

The BET Awards were established in 2001 by the BET Networks to celebrate African Americans and other Minority group in music, acting, sports, and other fields of entertainment over the past year.

Year	Nominee / work	Award	Result
2010	Melanie Fiona	Best Female R&B Artist	Nominated
2010	Melanie Fiona	Best New Artist	Nominated
2010	Melanie Fiona	BET Centric Award	Nominated
2010	"It Kills Me"	Video of the Year	Nominated
2012	Melanie Fiona	Best Female R&B Artist	Nominated

Eska Music Awards

Eska Music Awards is a major Polish awards ceremony for national and international music launched in 2002 by Radio Eska.

Year	Nominee / work	Award	Result
2010	The Bridge	Best International Album	Won

Grammy Award

A Grammy Award is an honour awarded by the National Academy of Recording Arts and Sciences of the United States to recognize outstanding achievement in the mainly English-language music industry.

Year	Nominee / work	Award	Result
2010	"It Kills Me"	Best Female R&B Vocal Performance	Nominated
2011	"Wake Up Everybody" (with Common, John Legend and the Roots)	Best Rap/Sung Collaboration	Nominated
2012	"Fool for You" (with CeeLo Green)	Best Traditional R&B Performance	Won
2012	"Fool for You" (with CeeLo Green)	Best R&B Song	Won
2013	"Wrong Side of a Love Song"	Best Traditional R&B Performance	Nominated

Juno Award

The Juno Award are presented annually to Canadian musical artists and bands to acknowledge their artistic and technical achievements in all aspects of music.

Year	Nominee / work	Award	Result
2010	The Bridge	R&B/Soul Recording of the Year	Nominated
2012	"Gone and Never Coming Back"	R&B/Soul Recording of the Year	Won

NAACP Image Award

An NAACP Image Award is an accolade presented by the American National Association for the Advancement of Colored People to honour outstanding person of color in film, television, music, and literature.

Year	Nominee / work	Award	Result
2010	Melanie Fiona	Outstanding New Artist	Nominated
2012	Ceelo Green & Melanie Fiona	Outstanding Duo or Group	Nominated
2012	"Fool For You" (with CeeLo Green)	Outstanding Song	Nominated

Soul Train Music Awards

The Soul Train Music Awards is an annual award show which previously aired in national Broadcast syndication, and honours the best in Black music and entertainment.

Year	Nominee / work	Award	Result
2010	Melanie Fiona	Best R&B/Soul or Rap New Artist	Won
