= SRC Records =

- Parent company: Universal Music Group
- Founded: 2000
- Founder: Steve Rifkind
- Distributors: Motown; Republic; Interscope; Arista; Columbia; Epic
- Genre: Hip hop, R&B
- Country of origin: United States

SRC (Street Records Corporation) is an American record label created by former Loud Records CEO Steve Rifkind. It is a subsidiary of Universal Music Group and is distributed through Motown and Republic Records since 2024 after relaunched on Christmas Eve.

== Company history ==
SRC was founded by Steve Rifkind in 2000. In 2002, he was ousted from his CEO position from Loud. Although he already had SRC, he made it a bigger priority and sign an exclusive distribution deal with Universal. The label was much like Loud Records, a hip hop and R&B label. The first move with the label was signing David Banner, a rapper from Jackson, Mississippi. With Banner as their flagship artist, SRC soared to great heights behind his 2003 debut. The label was instantly hailed as the second-coming of Interscope Records, due to the obvious similarities. The hit single "Like A Pimp," would make the label a household name within the hip hop community. During the year of 2003, the label would hit paydirt after hearing tapes from Senegalese singer, Akon, who they would immediately sign to their label. In 2004, Akon would release his multi-platinum debut album, Trouble. In early 2004, they signed a deal to distribute material from the rap supergroup, Terror Squad. SRC would go on to release all albums from Remy Ma and the group Terror Squad, itself. In the summer of 2004, SRC would become home to the hit single, "Lean Back," by Fat Joe and Remy Ma. After these releases, SRC had established itself among the other heavyweight record labels in hip hop music. In 2005, the label granted Akon his own label Konvict Muzik. The deal brought more artists on to the label and a hit album from Akon.

=== Loud deal and later successes ===
In June 2007, Sony Music resurrected Rifkind's original label, Loud Records. Loud had been home to many of the more popular hip hop acts of the time, but would shut down operations in 2004. After the resurrection of Loud, Rifkind would buy the label and make it a subsidiary of SRC. His first act after re-gaining the label was, as he did fifteen years earlier, signing the Wu-Tang Clan. In August 2010 Rifkind signed rapper Joell Ortiz in a deal with SRC Records and Universal Motown Records. The label had a deal with Universal Republic Records, later the label was reverted to Republic Records.

On July 29, 2012, Steve Rifkind announced that he was leaving Universal Music Group on September 1, 2012.

On Christmas Eve 2024, Steve Rifkind announced that he return to Universal Music Group and relaunch SRC Records under Universal Records, Motown Records and Republic Records.

== Labels under SRC ==
- Terror Squad Entertainment (before 2007)
- Loud Records
- UpFront Records
- Konvict Muzik

== Roster ==
Artist	Genre	Years active (on SRC)
Prodigy	Hip hop	2000–2002
Xzibit	Hip hop	2000–2002
Big Pun	Hip hop	2000 (posthumous)
Ric-A-Che	Hip hop	2002–2006
Grandaddy Souf	Hip hop	2002–2008
David Banner	Hip hop	2003–2010
Akon	R&B / Hip hop	2003–2012
Terror Squad	Hip hop	2004–2007
Remy Ma	Hip hop	2004–2007
Tyra B	R&B	2004-2005
Jae Millz	Hip hop	2005–2007
Young Cash	Hip hop	2005–2008
Topic	Hip hop	2005–2009
Majic Massey	R&B	2005–2012
Pharoahe Monch	Hip hop	2006–2009
Melissa Jimenez	R&B / Pop	2006–2009
Red Dirt	Hip hop	2006–2008
Vic Damone	Hip hop	2006–2009
Wu-Tang Clan	Hip hop	2007–2010
Shontelle	Pop / R&B	2007–2012
Melanie Fiona	R&B / Soul	2007–2012
Shiré	R&B	2007–2011
Desloc Piccalo	Hip hop	2007–2010
O'Neal McKnight	R&B / Dance	2007–2012
Asher Roth	Hip hop	2007–2012
Marky	Hip hop	2007–2010
Tami Chynn	R&B / Pop	2005–2010
Tha Crow	Hip hop	2007–2009
Corte Ellis	R&B	2008–2012
La The Darkman	Hip hop	2008–2012
American Yard	R&B / Pop	2008–2012
Kaze	Hip hop	2008–2012
Myko Slim	R&B	2009–2011
Play-N-Skillz	Hip hop / Production	2009–2011
DJ Webstar	Hip hop	2009–2012
Luey V	Hip hop	2009–2012
Ray J	R&B / Hip hop	2010–2012
Paypa	Hip hop	2010–2012

== SRC discography ==
- Big Pun - Yeeeah Baby (2000)
- David Banner – Mississippi: The Album (2003)
- Baby Bash – Tha Smokin' Nephew (2003)
- David Banner – MTA2: Baptized in Dirty Water (2003)
- Akon – Trouble (2004)
- Terror Squad – True Story (2004)
- Ric-A-Che – Lack of Communication (2004)
- Baby Bash – Super Saucy (2005)
- David Banner – Certified (2005)
- Remy Ma – There's Something About Remy (2006)
- Akon – Konvicted (2006)
- Pharoahe Monch – Desire (2007)
- Grandaddy Souf – Chasing My Dream (2007)
- Keith Sweat – The Sweat Hotel (2007)
- Wu-Tang Clan – 8 Diagrams (2007)
- Lil' Baza Featuring DJ Gayness (2008)
- David Banner – The Greatest Story Ever Told(2008)
- Shontelle – Shontelligence (2008)
- Akon – Freedom (2008)
- Lala Man – September (2008)
- Heavy Mojo – Blow Out The Sound (2009)
- Asher Roth – Asleep in the Bread Aisle (2009)
- Melanie Fiona – The Bridge (2009)
- Shontelle - No Gravity (2010)
- Melanie Fiona - The MF Life (2012)

== See also ==
- List of record labels
- List of SRC artists
