= List of awards and nominations received by Kwasi Danquah III =

Kwasi Danquah III awards and nominations
Award	Wins	Nominations
BET Awards	0	1
Brit Awards	0	1
MOBO Awards	1	7
MP3 Music Awards	0	1
MTV Europe Music Awards	0	1
Urban Music Awards	1	5
- Totals
Awards won	2
Nominations	16

The following is a comprehensive list of awards and nominations received by Danquah III (known by his pseudonyms Tinchy Stryder and Star in the Hood), a music artist, music executive, A&R executive and business manager. He began his career in 2000, possibly earlier in 1997 on pirate radio sets in East London with other grime artists such as Dizzee Rascal and Wiley in 2000. He has been one of the most popular rap acts in the Europe and UK since the mid to late-2000s.

Before the release of his third studio album, Third Strike in 2010, he became the protégé of fellow rapper and music-mogul Jay-Z, and after the release of his debut mixtapes, I'm Back U Know and Lost and Found in 2006, he also became the protégé of fellow grime artist and producer Dizzee Rascal in 2007.

Danquah has released one independent record label solo studio album solely with Takeover Entertainment Limited and two solo studio albums from the Universal Music Group, Universal Island Records record label combined with independent record label Takeover Entertainment Ltd: Star in the Hood (2007), Catch 22 (2009) and Third Strike on November 15, 2010. In June 2010, Danquah co-founded the record label and entertainment company Takeover Roc Nation with Jay-Z.

The release of Danquah's second solo album and its lead singles "Stryderman", "Number 1" with N-Dubz in 2009 and Never Leave You with Amelle Berrabah also in 2009, led to his nomination for a Brit Award, Music of Black Origin Awards (MOBO), Urban Music Awards (UMA), MTV Europe Music Award (EMA), and other honors. During 2008 in his first ever award nomination Kwasi Danquah III won his first award, an Urban Music Award. In 2010, he was nominated for an additional three MOBOs, which he shared one with N-Dubz, and has been nominated for a total of sixteen music awards throughout his music career.

== BET Awards ==
Established in 2001 by the Black Entertainment Television (BET) network to celebrate African Americans and other minorities in music, acting, sports, and other fields of entertainment, the awards are presented annually and broadcast live on BET. Danquah has been nominated once.

Year	Region	Ceremony	Category	Nominated work	Result	Ref.
2011	United States	BET Awards of 2011	BET Award for Best International Act: UK	Kwasi Danquah III	Nominated	

== Brit Awards ==
The Brit Awards are the British Phonographic Industry's (BPI) annual pop music awards. Danquah has been nominated once.

Year	Region	Ceremony	Category	Nominated work	Result	Ref.
2010	United Kingdom	2010 BRIT Awards	Brit Award for British Single	"Number 1"	Nominated	

== MOBO Awards ==
The MOBO Awards (Music of Black Origin) first held in 1996, are held annually in the United Kingdom to recognize artists of any race or nationality who perform black music and showcase "the world of urban music including R&B, hip-hop, gospel and reggae as a potent force in the cultural worldwide music community". Danquah has won one award from seven nominations.

Year	Region	Ceremony	Category	Nominated work	Result	Ref.
2008	United Kingdom	MOBO Awards	Best Video	"Stryderman"	Nominated	
2009	United Kingdom	MOBO Awards	Best Album	Catch 22	Nominated	
2009	United Kingdom	MOBO Awards	Best Song	"Number 1"	Nominated	
2009	United Kingdom	MOBO Awards	Best UK Act	Kwasi Danquah III	Nominated	
2010	United Kingdom	MOBO Awards	Best Video – In association with MTV Base	"Number 1"	Nominated	
2010	United Kingdom	MOBO Awards	UK Act – In association with Lebara Mobile	Kwasi Danquah III	Nominated	
2011	United Kingdom	MOBO Awards	Best Video	"Spaceship"	Won	

== MP3 Music Awards ==
The MP3 Music Awards (MMA) is an annual awards ceremony established in 2007 to celebrate and award the most popular artists and bands as well as the best mp3 players and mp3 retailers in today's world of music.

MMA act as a major industry catalyst, creating the conditions to inspire diverse artists / bands and audiences whilst shaping memorable and unforgettable experiences. MP3 Music Awards works with industry individuals, sponsors and media partners across the UK and overseas.

Now the awards heads into its 4th year, MMA is now firmly established as one of the most important events on the industry calendar and has a past guest list that includes an array of industry celebrities, and top media executives. Danquah has been nominated once.

Year	Region	Ceremony	Category	Nominated work	Result	Ref.
2009	Worldwide	MP3 Music Awards	The UGG Award Urban / Garage / Grime	"Never Leave You"	Nominated	

== MTV ==
=== MTV Europe Music Awards ===
The MTV Europe Music Awards (EMA) were established in 1994 by MTV Networks Europe to celebrate the most popular music videos in Europe. Danquah has been nominated once.

Year	Region	Ceremony	Category	Nominated work	Result	Ref.
2009	European Union	MTV Europe Music Awards	Best UK & Republic of Ireland New Act	"Number 1"	Nominated	

== Urban Music Awards ==
The British Urban Music Awards (UMA) were launched in 2003 to recognize the achievement of urban artists, producers, nightclubs, DJs, radio stations, and record labels. Danquah has won one award from five nominations.

Year	Region	Ceremony	Category	Nominated work	Result	Ref.
2008	United Kingdom	Urban Music Awards	Best Newcomer	Kwasi Danquah III	Nominated	
2008	United Kingdom	Urban Music Awards	Best Video	"Stryderman"	Won	
2009	United Kingdom	Urban Music Awards	Best Single 2009 (USA & UK)	"Never Leave You"	Nominated	
2011	United Kingdom	Urban Music Awards	Best Collaboration sponsored by Corona Extra	"Spaceship"	Nominated	
2011	United Kingdom	Urban Music Awards	Best Single	"Spaceship"	Nominated	
