= Guns and Roses (disambiguation) =

Guns N' Roses is an American hard rock band.

Guns and Roses may also refer to:

- Guns N' Roses (EP)
- Guns N' Roses (pinball)
- "Guns and Roses" (NUMB3RS), an episode of the American television show Numb3rs
- Guns and Roses: Ik Junoon, a 1999 Pakistani film
- Guns and Roses (2012 film), a 2012 Chinese film
- Guns and Roses (TV series), a Philippine television series
- Guns and Roses Volume. 1, the debut studio album of the Ghanaian-British grime band Ruff Sqwad
- Guns and Roses Volume. 2, the second studio album by Ruff Sqwad
- "Guns and Roses", a 2013 song by Jay Sean from his album Neon
- "Guns and Roses", a 2014 song by Lana Del Rey from her album Ultraviolence
- "Guns & Roses", a 2002 song by Jay-Z from his album The Blueprint 2: The Gift & The Curse
- "Gun's & Roses", an opening theme of the 2007 Japanese anime television series Baccano!
- Guns & Gulaabs (lit. 'Guns & Roses'), 2023 Indian comedy crime thriller television series
- "Guns N' Roses", a 2025 song by Thaman S from the film They Call Him OG

== See also ==
- "Bullets and Roses", a chapter from the 2025 Indian film Dhurandhar
