= List of Budoy episodes =

Budoy is a Philippine drama television series broadcast by ABS-CBN. The show is topbilled by Gerald Anderson, Jessy Mendiola and Enrique Gil. The show aired on the network's Primetime Bida evening block from October 10, 2011, to March 9, 2012, replacing Guns and Roses and was replaced by Dahil Sa Pag-ibig.

== Series overview ==
Year	Episode numbers	Episodes	First aired	Last aired
2011	1–60	60	October 10, 2011	December 30, 2011
2012	61–110	50	January 2, 2012	March 9, 2012

== Episodes ==
=== 2011 ===
No.	Title	Original release date
1	"Family Problems Arise After Discovering Benjamin's Unfortunate Condition"	October 10, 2011
In their quest for a child, a renowned OB/GYN, Dr. Anton, performs artificial insemination on his barren wife, Luisa, resulting in a son they named Benjamin. When the boy shows signs of intellectual disability, he is taken away by his grandmother. Dr. Anton Maniego performs in vitro fertilization on his wife, Luisa, and she successfully bears a son, Benjamin. Years later, Benjamin is diagnosed with retardation. Unable to accept the possibility that his procedure may have caused his son's condition, Anton vows to find a cure for Benjamin—until a tragedy occurs.
2	"Budoy Ends Up with Loving and Nurturing Arms"	October 11, 2011
When Anton discovers that Budoy has been kidnapped by a nanny hired for him, he goes to great lengths to trick Luisa into thinking another boy is her own. Years pass, Budoy grows up to be a kind man working as a janitor at his former school. Anton discovers that there is more to Benjamin's disappearance than meets the eye. Under Elena's care, young Benjamin starts calling himself "Budoy." A tragedy ultimately separates Budoy from Anton. Not knowing where to return Budoy, Elena makes a life-changing decision.
3	"Alberta and Anton's Plans for Budoy Backfires"	October 12, 2011
Elena takes Budoy back to Manila where he is reunited with his best friend Jackie. Despite her boyfriend BJ choosing not to come, Jackie and Budoy catch up. Soon after, however, Budoy meets Luisa, who comforts him after he gets bullied. Grace proposes a plan to help Luisa overcome her grief. Meanwhile, Budoy is separated from his only best friend.
4	"Budoy Gets Stuck in a Fire Accident"	October 13, 2011
Budoy gets accepted as Maniego Foundation's scholar, only to become a gardener when the school's funding is cut. Jackie and Budoy have a slight misunderstanding. Desperate to find a better place for her adopted son, Elena and Budoy move to the city. Meanwhile, Budoy is reunited with a person he has always longed to see.
5	"Hanging Out with Jackie Is Not Good for Budoy at All"	October 14, 2011
Luisa invites Budoy and Elena to the Maniego Foundation's anniversary party. Learning about the event, Alberta thinks of a way to steal Luisa's major investor. Jackie and Budoy spend a fun day together. Budoy eases tensions between Elena and her father. Luisa's chance encounter with Budoy deeply touches her.
6	"Budoy Is Very Excited to Go to School"	October 17, 2011
Things take a turn for the better when Budoy makes a heartfelt appeal on behalf of Luisa's proposed school. Elena finally musters the courage to reveal her secrets to Renato.
7	"Budoy's Schooling Takes a Downturn"	October 18, 2011
Renato fears that Budoy will start asking questions about his own past after having dinner with Anton and Luisa. Unfortunately, Budoy has a bigger problem to face when Grace demands his termination from his job.
8	"Luisa Develops a Great Fondness for Budoy"	October 19, 2011
Grace admits that BJ is actually her son and has no blood relation to Luisa. She also begins despising Budoy, leaving Luisa to protect him. Anton starts suspecting that Budoy might be his real son. Jackie convinces Budoy that they remain best friends. Budoy inspires Luisa to continue her project. Luisa's unsolicited care for Budoy offends Elena.
9	"Luisa Shares the Anniversary of Her Foundation with Budoy"	October 20, 2011
Grace finds the perfect opportunity to get a DNA sample from both Anton and Budoy. At the same time, the young man ends up taking over as the Maniego basketball team mascot and helps inspire the team to win. Budoy and Lenlen accept Luisa's offer to make Budoy the face of the Maniego Foundation. Behind Luisa's back, Alberta and Grace conspire to prevent Luisa's project from coming true. Due to BJ's friends' influence, Budoy creates a scene at Luisa's party.
10	"Budoy Makes Quite an Impression in the Foundation's Party"	October 21, 2011
As Budoy gets into trouble after defending a student from a group of bullies, Grace takes advantage of the situation to weed him out of the Maniegos' lives upon discovering his true identity. For the first time, Anton meets the boy whom he believes to be his missing son, and the woman who might be the one he has been searching for. Alberta and Grace succeed in taking away Luisa's investor. Budoy makes a brave move to save Luisa's project.
11	"Anton Finds a Way to Dig on Elena and Budoy's Background"	October 24, 2011
With BJ and Jackie's help, Budoy gets cleared of all accusations and returns to his job as a gardener while Elena becomes Luisa's secretary. Soon, a frantic Elena rushes to the hospital when Budoy catches a high fever. Elena reveals her painful past to her father. Alberta makes it harder for Luisa to achieve her goals for the foundation. Anton gets closer to knowing the truth about his missing son.
12	"Anton Finds a Way to Uncover Elena's Secret"	October 25, 2011
Grace lies about Budoy's true identity. As Jackie and BJ become finalists on an academic quiz show, a proud Anton and Alberta plan a party for them. Elena becomes wary of the people connected to the Maniegos. Intuition tells Anton that Budoy could be his missing son. Elena vows that she will never lose Budoy to anyone. Grace is threatened by Luisa's success in winning investors because of Budoy.
13	"Carlos Thinks of a Way to Save Elena from Losing Budoy"	October 26, 2011
Elena learns that the Maniegos are searching for Budoy. Meanwhile, Luisa finds a site for her future school, but Alberta ends up securing the land. Now, Anton is torn between the demands of his wife and his mother. Grace experiences pressure on all fronts when she discovers that Anton is bent on tracing the whereabouts of his long-lost son and that Luisa is making significant headway with her foundation.
14	"Jackie Rethinks Her Plans for Her Future"	October 27, 2011
Following her father's advice, Elena resolves to return Budoy to the Maniegos. She, however, makes disturbing discoveries about the family. Meanwhile, Budoy tries to plead with Alberta about the foundation. Grace starts to fear for BJ's place in the Maniego family when she finds out that Anton is still looking for his missing son. To keep tabs on the progress of Anton's search, she decides to hire her own private investigator.
15	"Grace Hopes to Find Carlos Before Anton for Bj's Sake"	October 28, 2011
Budoy, Jackie, and BJ attend a party, where they all, except BJ, end up humiliated. At the same time, when Elena confirms that Budoy is the real Benjamin Maniego, Grace blackmails her to keep the secret. Grace's secret investigation leads her to a troubling conclusion: that Anton suspects Budoy to be his missing son. Meanwhile, Elena and her father are relieved to find out that the death Elena's real son bears no records.
16	"Budoy Must Gather Enough Strength to Face Difficulties in Life"	October 31, 2011
Budoy undergoes brain surgery after meeting a deadly accident while caught in a rainstorm with Jackie and BJ. The incident triggers a chain of events that reveals his true identity to everyone involved, including Luisa. Luisa's closeness to Budoy and the possibility that Budoy's real relatives might one day take him away from her begin to take their toll on Elena. Meanwhile, Anton tells Grace and Isaac that Budoy might be his real son.
17	"Budoy Is Very Excited with His Upcoming School Performance"	November 1, 2011
The Maniegos scramble to do damage control as the truth unravels. Meanwhile, BJ attempts to hurt himself when he learns he is an illegitimate son. Seeking revenge on Budoy, Grace tries to kill him in his hospital room. Grace makes a move to find out the truth behind Anton and Budoy's identities. Budoy gets his wish to perform before his loved ones.
18	"Elena Is Confident That She Won't Lose Her Son, Budoy"	November 2, 2011
Chaos ensues when Grace tries to kill a helpless Budoy in his hospital bed while Alberta wants Anton to disown him. As Budoy regains consciousness, Anton warns everyone to keep the young man's identity a secret until he has fully recovered. Anton's investigation leads to a dead end. On the other hand, Grace own investigation confirms her worst fears: Budoy is indeed Anton's missing son.
19	"Elena Turns Down Luisa and Isaac's Offer to Help Budoy"	November 3, 2011
Anton and Luisa finally tell Budoy the truth that he is their real son, reuniting the happy family. However, a resentful BJ ends up turning to alcohol after Budoy moved in with them. Realizing that Anton's son--Budoy--is now just within reach, Grace begins to fear for BJ's place in the Maniego family. Budoy tells on BJ's bully friends, prompting the latter to gang up on him. However, their plan to hurt Budoy backfires.
20	"Budoy Gets Involved in Another Controversy at School"	November 4, 2011
Tensions continue to linger between Budoy and BJ which escalate when the latter accidentally causes a fire and tries to blame it on Budoy. While the rest of the Maniegos deal with the outcome of the fire, Grace is still being blackmailed by Henry. Grace finds an excuse to fire Budoy. Angered by Grace's harsh treatment of her son, Elena gets into an altercation with Grace that ultimately costs her and Budoy's job.
21	"Bj and Jackie Helps Budoy Get Over His Fear of Lightning"	November 7, 2011
BJ continues to rebel because of the attention Anton and Luisa are giving Budoy. When Elena tells Anton that someone ordered Jinggay to kidnap Budoy in the past, Alberta issues a restraining order against her. The university hires Budoy and Elena once again. To her dismay, Elena discovers that her father is still trying to investigate the people looking for Budoy. Budoy gets sick after staying out in the rain. At the hospital where Budoy is confined, Renato spots a man who seems to be looking for his grandson.
22	"Elena Wants to Know the Connection Between the Maniegos and Budoy"	November 8, 2011
Tensions rise between Elena and Luisa as they fight over who is more fit to raise Budoy enough. Alberta even offers to buy Elena off but she refuses. Things get worse when Anton intercepts all attempts by Elena to get in touch with Budoy. Grace continues to worry about Anton and Isaac's growing fondness for Budoy. Elena and her father decide to investigate Budoy's possible connection to the Maniegos. Alberta tells Anton why she is resentful of Budoy and people like him.
23	"Elena Is Very Troubled with What She Discovered"	November 9, 2011
Concerned with his foster mother, Elena, Budoy regularly sneaks out to see her. Valuing his safety over their feud, Elena and Luisa decide to share custody of him and find out his IQ has now increased a bit more than before. Elena discovers that the man looking for Budoy is connected to the Maniegos. Grace tells Alberta that Anton is still looking for his missing son, and that Budoy is not the missing Benjamin they have all been looking for. Alberta and Isaac try to convince Anton to give up his search.
24	"Elena Breaks Down After Discovering Budoy's Real Identity"	November 10, 2011
Despite BJ's efforts to win her heart, Jackie can only offer him friendship. Infuriated by her turning him down, he becomes immensely jealous of Budoy, whose increasing intelligence leads him to take a high school equivalency test. After discovering that her former employer Jinggay is connected to the Maniegos, Elena concludes that Budoy is Anton and Luisa's missing son. This urges Elena to flee from the Maniegos, but her father gives her tough advice on Budoy's right to be with his true family who can probably give him a better future.
25	"Elena Can't Bear to Tell the Truth to Luisa"	November 11, 2011
Despite Grace's attempt to sabotage him, Budoy passes his high school equivalency exam. Unbeknownst to him, Alberta and Grace are planning something against him to save their company and reputation. Despite her realization that she must prioritize Budoy's welfare, Elena still feels reluctant to give him up. Jackie's refusal to take their relationship to the next level frustrates BJ. Grace tries to block Luisa's plans for the foundation.
26	"The Maniego Family Faces Problems After Acquiring a Land Property"	November 14, 2011
BJ grows more jealous of Budoy upon seeing him dancing with Jackie during their homecoming ball. Soon, Budoy finds an opportunity to confess his feelings for his best friend. Grace and Alberta's latest affront to Luisa and her plans for the foundation angers Anton. Meanwhile, the Maniego family's chaotic setup makes Elena rethink her decision to return Budoy to them.
27	"Budoy Gets Into a Wrong Trip While Trying to Reach the Maniegos"	November 15, 2011
Grace comes up with a way to force Anton to let her and Alberta study Budoy's condition. Helping with the orphanage's holiday preparations, BJ corners Jackie and admits his feelings for her. Determined to win back the lot reserved for his special school, Budoy decides to act on his own and look for Alberta. His little adventure turns into trouble, however, until someone comes along to save him: Alberta.
28	"BJ, Budoy and Jackie Dance Their Way in a Club"	November 16, 2011
Budoy becomes part of the Philippines IQ team after defeating all contenders, including BJ. However, he soon finds himself in a precarious situation when he gets framed for cheating. Alberta's meeting with Budoy triggers feelings of guilt over her missing grandson. Anton devises a plan that will let him recover Luisa's lot. BJ's aggressive behavior at a party turns off Jackie. BJ's friends gang up on Budoy once more.
29	"Elena Gets in Trouble at Work"	November 17, 2011
Budoy and Jackie fail to entrap BJ's friends into admitting their guilt about the cheating case. Grace uses her former patient's record to mislead Anton in his search for BJ's parents. Elena's suspicion is confirmed: Budoy is the missing son of Luisa and Anton Maniego. Grace accuses Elena of stealing checks meant for the Maniego hospitel. Rumors about Jackie and BJ already having sex spread around the university. Elena talks to Budoy about moving once again.
30	"BJ Loses Control After Losing Jackie"	November 18, 2011
Budoy passes the exam given by the disciplinary committee and manages to impress everyone when he clarifies a confusing math problem. BJ's friend takes all the blame for the mess in exchange for Grace facilitating his transfer to another school. Grace suspects that Henry, her old flame, has returned to the Philippines. Meanwhile, BJ's desperate attempts to win Jackie back culminate in tragedy.
31	"Elena Tearfully Tells Luisa the Truth"	November 21, 2011
Margaret and Elena get into an argument over Budoy and Jackie's blossoming relationship. BJ comes upon a discovery about his biological mother. With the help of the pep squad, Budoy asks Jackie to be his girlfriend. Budoy suffers a fatal accident. Budoy's medical findings bring Isaac and Anton to a conclusion: Budoy might be the real Benjamin. Elena is still determined to move away from the city once Budoy recovers.
32	"Luisa Confronts the Maniegos If There Is Any Truth to Elena's Confession"	November 22, 2011
As BJ looks for his real mother, Grace comes up with a way to mislead the Maniegos from uncovering the truth. However, Budoy senses something amiss in Anna's and Jimmy's statements. Meanwhile, Margaret learns of Budoy and Jackie's relationship. Elena's claims regarding Budoy's identity are confirmed by his DNA test result. In a desperate attempt to conceal their deception, Alberta blames Jinggay for Budoy's disappearance. Realizing her failure as BJ's real mother, Grace takes the initiative to break the news to BJ.
33	"BJ Gets Into a Car Accident After Talking to Her Aunt Grace"	November 23, 2011
Upon her return, Luisa confronts Anton about his lies regarding their sons’ problems. Budoy falls in danger after suffering from another debilitating headache. BJ forces Grace to admit the truth about his real mother. The news about Budoy's identity distresses BJ. Out of frustration, he begs Grace to take him to his first foster parents, but eventually realizes that his search for his real family may be futile. Meanwhile, Grace is overcome with guilt over an old crime that started it all.
34	"Grace Does All She Can to Save BJ and Cover Up Her Mistakes"	November 24, 2011
Budoy secretly sees Jackie after regaining his strength. However, Margaret catches them and informs Luisa of Budoy's visit. Seeing Anton and Luisa engrossed in Budoy's problems, he decides to keep Grace's secret, realizing she is his only family now. The Maniego's rivals, the Velezes, leak the news about the Maniego family's situation to the press. Depression causes BJ to almost take his own life. Tormented by what BJ is going through, Grace attempts to kill Budoy, but Elena stops her. The Velez's spy discovers the identity of Anton and Luisa's real son. Grace makes another attempt on Budoy's life, but her plan is foiled once again when Budoy starts having convulsions.
35	"The Maniego Family Tries to Save Their Reputation"	November 25, 2011
Budoy convinces his grandfather to keep his worsening headaches a secret. Later, Budoy discovers that Henry and his gang abducted Alberta. Meanwhile, BJ learns that Henry is his biological father. After a series of seizures, Budoy finally wakes up from his coma. In an effort to sabotage the Maniego's reputation, the Velezes expose Budoy's mental condition. Alberta has a change of heart for Budoy. Grace meets Henry once again after a long time.
36	"Elena Turns Down Luisa and Isaac's Offer to Help Budoy"	November 28, 2011
Budoy convinces his grandfather to keep his worsening headaches a secret. Later, Budoy discovers that Henry and his gang abducted Alberta. Meanwhile, BJ learns that Henry is his biological father. Budoy's recovery from his coma gladdens everyone--except for BJ and Luisa. Luisa insists that she saw Budoy talking normally. Meanwhile, Anton goes to great lengths to shield Budoy from the public.
37	"Budoy Discovers His Real Identity"	November 29, 2011
Budoy surmises that Henry and Grace are BJ's biological parents. Failing to convince Budoy of her innocence, Grace tries to hurt him again. Soon, she admits to Isaac the truth. Budoy learns the truth from the reporters who are hounding him, and this prompts Elena and the Maniegos to finally come clean about his origins. Budoy's unusual behavior following his recovery catches Anton's notice.
38	"Budoy Lives in the Maniego Mansion"	November 30, 2011
Anton cuts off all his family's ties with Grace, but Luisa demands him to get BJ back. Budoy wishes to investigate Grace's involvement in his abduction. Grace manipulates Alberta into pushing for BJ's adoption. Anton reprimands Grace for stealing his role as a parent. Budoy is released from the hospital and goes home with the Maniegos. For the first time ever, Elena and Rene come home without Budoy. Budoy displays unusual behavior that unnerves his family. Grace accuses Budoy of eavesdropping on her phone conversation with Henry.
39	"BJ Is Finding it Hard to Accept Budoy as Part of His Family"	December 1, 2011
While in Pampanga, Budoy finds out that Anton was behind his kidnapping as a child. Budoy is rushed to the hospital after suffering from another headache. While there, Budoy snoops around his father's office and locates his medical files. Budoy adjusts to his new home as a Maniego. BJ's growing resentment towards Budoy causes him to get into trouble. Anton suspects that Budoy's cognitive abilities may be improving.
40	"Alberta Believes That Elena Is Destroying Her Family's Reputation"	December 2, 2011
Anton admits his transgression to Luisa but leaves out the role his mother played in Budoy's abduction. Upon finding out that he has a brain tumor, Budoy reassures Jackie with a promise. Budoy reacts unusually to a fire that BJ has caused. Despite her reservations about Elena, Alberta allows Budoy to see his foster mother. Anton and Luisa pursue BJ's legal adoption. Anton and Isaac investigate Budoy's behavioral and cognitive changes.
41	"Elena Wonders How the Maniegos Know Jinggay"	December 5, 2011
Grace makes a deal with Luisa after showing the latter a video of Alberta confessing to Budoy's abduction. Later, Luisa reveals the truth to Budoy and makes an effort to secure her son's future. Elena's presence in the Maniego household keeps Luisa from assuming her role as Budoy's mother. Threatened by the extent of Elena's knowledge about Jinggay and her connections, Alberta tries to secure a restraining order against Elena. Jackie manages to somehow bridge the gap between BJ and Budoy. Elena asks her father to investigate Jinggay.
42	"Elena Feels the Wrath of the Maniegos"	December 6, 2011
Luisa's and Budoy's lives get in peril as they encounter Henry while trying to escape. Alberta apologizes to Budoy for her wrongdoings and makes a revelation that does not escape Grace's notice. Elena's excessive fussing over Budoy annoys Luisa and Anton. Budoy shows another improvement in his cognitive abilities. Anton orders his private investigator to prevent Elena from uncovering further information about Jinggay. A fight ensues between Luisa and Elena because of the Maniego's restraining order.
43	"The Maniegos Forbid Elena to Be a Part of Budoy's Life"	December 7, 2011
Jackie convinces Budoy to seek treatment in the US. Grace files kidnapping charges against the Maniegos despite Luisa being in a coma. Worried that this might affect his son's decision to leave, Anton tells Elena not to inform Budoy of the lawsuit. Budoy gets appointed by Kapitan as the chairman of the baranggay brigade as more and more crimes take place in their town. Meanwhile, Ador keeps an eye on Michael's whereabouts as he mistakes him as Budoy. While Olga is reading the diary, she suddenly receives a call from a certain Señora to whom she reports that she has finally found Budoy.
44	"Elena Fights for Her Right to See Budoy"	December 8, 2011
Against Anton's order, Isaac helps Budoy and Luisa attend the trial. Budoy helps Luisa communicate her desire to withdraw the case. Anton convinces BJ to come home and asks Elena and her family to move to the mansion to care for Luisa and Budoy. Olga receives a call from Senyora, and will finally get the chance to reveal the truth about Budoy. Elsewhere, Weng and Julia sell concert ticket to Budoy, which he passes to Dencio, and which Dencio accepts so he can invite Sesta to go and watch with him.
45	"Budoy Misses Elena a Lot"	December 9, 2011
Despite Grace's insults, Coring tells Elena they should stay at the mansion to protect Budoy's rights. Budoy throws a birthday party for Jackie. He catches Grace almost injecting Luisa with an unknown substance, ending in a brawl between him and BJ. As Budoy and his roving patrol team continue to save their place, Maximo hires Ador to watch over Budoy. Sesta continuously receives gifts from her secret admirer while Olga lost Budoy's diary.
46	"Budoy Puts His Best Foot Forward to Impress Jackie"	December 10, 2011
Grace is now a fugitive from the law as she agrees to help Henry and Duke. BJ helps Budoy prepare for his marriage proposal to Jackie. Soon, however, while Grace takes BJ, Henry intercepts Jackie's car and makes off with her.
47	"BJ Loses Patience and Hurts Budoy"	December 13, 2011
Upon tracking Grace and BJ, Duke uses them to strike a deal with Henry. When his first rescue attempt fails, Budoy sneaks out to look for BJ and Jackie on his own. Siblings Mary Ann and George accuse Estalon of peeking and report him to Kendi. Unaware that her granddaughter lied to Senyora, Olga reads Budoy's diary and scans a portion about Maximo.
48	"BJ Feels That Budoy Is Taking Everything Away from Him"	December 14, 2011
Budoy goes on TV to appeal for BJ and Jackie's return. Later, a shootout breaks out during the rescue mission, prompting BJ to save Jackie from harm's way.
49	"Grace Must Gain Full Control of Budoy"	December 15, 2011
Budoy tries to prove his worth after his best friend rejected his marriage offer. Despite Jackie's protests, BJ insists on revealing his feelings for Jackie to his brother. Boss Chief returns and gives Dencio a task. Meanwhile, Sesta's secret admirer continues to send gifts, which the old lady refuses to accept.
50	"Budoy Proclaims His Admiration for Jackie"	December 16, 2011
With Anton's intervention, Budoy learns to appreciate BJ's efforts and soon reconciles with him. While his brother and his best friend pursue their medical studies abroad, Budoy finally realizes his dream. Budoy's emotional growth runs parallel with his rapid mental development as his feelings for Jackie becomes apparent. Meanwhile, Grace convinces Alberta to study Budoy's development in secret.
51	"Budoy Invites Jackie to Homecoming"	December 19, 2011
Budoy finally goes to college. BJ is hurt after learning that his name will be changed to Benjamin Maniego II. Luisa fears that Budoy's blossoming relationship with Jackie will hurt BJ even more.
52	"Grace Gets Into Jackie's Head During Homecoming"	December 20, 2011
Budoy manages to defend himself from BJ and his friends at the party. Grace urges Jackie to disregard Luisa's advice and fight for her friendship with Budoy instead. Budoy confesses his feelings to Jackie.
53	"Jackie Presses the Importance of Their Friendship to Budoy"	December 21, 2011
Grace hopes that Budoy and Jackie will disregard Luisa's advice by falling for each other. Jackie turns down Budoy but confides to her mother that falling for him is not impossible. Budoy's surprise deeply touches Jackie. BJ schemes to humiliate Budoy.
54	"Everyone Notices Budoy's Great Mental Improvement"	December 22, 2011
Jackie admits to Budoy that she also has feelings for him. Anton finds out that Alberta and Grace are researching on Budoy's condition behind his back. Jackie and Budoy's chemistry becomes more apparent to BJ as the three of them volunteer at the orphanage. BJ makes an ill-conceived decision to let reporters inside the orphanage.
55	"Budoy Celebrates Christmas with the Needy"	December 23, 2011
Budoy attracts the interest of the media with his intellectual development and heroic deed. As Budoy becomes the apple of everyone's eyes, BJ gets consumed by anger and jealousy at the sidelines.
56	"Budoy Thinks of a Way to Make BJ Happier"	December 26, 2011
Budoy makes his family proud after making it to the "Pilipinas IQ" team. Budoy seeks Grace's help to find BJ's biological parents. Meanwhile, unhappy over Budoy's achievement, a jealous BJ schemes to humiliate Budoy.
57	"Jackie Believes That BJ Is Responsible with Budoy's Cheating Case"	December 27, 2011
Expulsion awaits Budoy if he is proven guilty of cheating in the exams. Grace discovers that BJ is behind the crime, but covers it up. Learning that Anton wishes to search for BJ's real parents, Grace decides to sabotage Anton's investigation.
58	"How Can Budoy Prove His Innocence?"	December 28, 2011
Budoy and Jackie come up with a possible lead in Budoy's case where Grace is a primary suspect. BJ overhears this and warns his aunt. Grace bribes BJ's previous foster parents to keep their secret, but to no avail.
59	"Budoy Tells His Side of the Story"	December 29, 2011
Budoy asks the university's disciplinary committee to let him take his exam again. Grace grants Budoy's request on one condition: that he takes the exam in front of the committee. Grace makes BJ's first foster parents Ana and Jimmy rethink their decision. Anton instructs his private investigator to return to the city to find out more about BJ's adoptive parents.
60	"Budoy and Jackie Finally Finds the Cheating Evidence"	December 30, 2011
Budoy impresses the committee as he defends his math problem solutions before them. BJ's first foster parents lie to Anton about BJ's biological mother. Jackie and Budoy decide to act on their own after learning that BJ's friends have set Budoy's test papers on fire.

=== 2012 ===
No.	Title	Original release date
61	"BJ Realizes the Roots of His Problem"	January 2, 2012
Budoy's name is cleared. Grace covers up BJ's involvement in Budoy's case. Budoy asks his father to help BJ look for his real parents. BJ angrily confronts his adoptive parents and tells them how much he despises his real mother. Margie discourages Jackie from falling for Budoy. Grace is hurt by BJ's words.
62	"Grace Will Hide Her Secret as Long as Possible"	January 3, 2012
Budoy feels guilty about his suggestion that the Maniegos look for BJ's real parents. Grace manipulates Margie into opposing Jackie and Budoy's blossoming relationship even more. Ana and Jimmy fabricate stories in front of Grace and BJ and almost screw up their story. Before the VTR for "Pilipinas IQ," Budoy suggests a way for BJ to reach out to his real mother.
63	"Budoy Thanks Jackie for Her Special Love"	January 4, 2012
Jackie confesses her love for Budoy. Already in a relationship with Jackie, Budoy feels guilty after learning that Margie disapproves of him. Jackie decides to wait for a better time to tell Margie about her and Budoy. Meanwhile, Henry escapes from jail.
64	"BJ Receives Bad News about His Biological Mother"	January 5, 2012
News of Henry's escape and BJ's announcement on the identity of his mother pressures Grace to put an end to Anton's investigation on BJ's mother. At Ana and Jimmy's house, Budoy gets information that links Ana to Heidi. Anton remorsefully informs BJ that Heidi had already passed away.
65	"Budoy Gives Hope to BJ with His Discovery"	January 6, 2012
Henry joins a syndicate to take his revenge on Grace. Budoy senses discrepancies in the information he gathered and relays this to BJ. With his previous suspicion affirmed, BJ continues his search for his real mother, even without Grace's help. Soon enough, BJ begins to suspect that even Grace is also hiding something from him. Meanwhile, Margie begins to treat Budoy with coldness when she learns of his relationship with her daughter.
66	"Luisa Expresses Her Concerns with Budoy and Jackie's Relationship"	January 9, 2012
Grace finds herself cornered by BJ's insistent search for his real mother and Henry's continued presence. Grace grants BJ's request to interview his adoptive parents once again, but Ana and Jimmy's deception become more apparent this time. Meanwhile, Luisa opposes the idea of Budoy falling in love.
67	"Budoy Stands by His Love for Jackie"	January 10, 2012
Luisa and Margie's lack of support for his relationship with Jackie disappoints Budoy. Desperate for the truth, BJ finds himself at the verge of committing suicide. Left without a choice, Grace finally divulges the truth to BJ. Budoy suffers another headache that leads him to harm.
68	"Grace Tries to Explain to BJ Why She Gave Him Up"	January 11, 2012
Grace finally explains the truth to BJ, but BJ cannot forgive her for everything she had done. After falling into the pool, Budoy shows another abrupt change in his speech. Luisa is set on making decisions for her children once and for all. BJ is torn between telling Anton the truth he had just learned and keeping it a secret between him and Grace.
69	"BJ Must Accept Grace as His Real Mother"	January 12, 2012
BJ decides to keep the truth from Anton and accept Grace as his real mother. Despite Luisa and Margaret's forbbidance, Budoy and Jackie fight for their love. Grace vows not to let Budoy steal anything from BJ again. For the first time, Budoy defends himself from Luisa and Anton, asserting that there is nothing wrong with him at anymore.
70	"Jackie Steps Up and Defend Her Love for Budoy"	January 13, 2012
Grace tells BJ about his real father. With Grace's support, BJ vows not to let Budoy surpass him as a worthy Maniego. Despite the odds, Budoy fights for his and Jackie's love and earns a special reward for it. BJ, Budoy, and Jackie represent the school in the "Pilipinas IQ" semi-finals.
71	"Budoy Captures Everyone's Heart in Pilipinas IQ"	January 16, 2012
72	"BJ Confronts His Biological Father"	January 17, 2012
73	"Budoy Wants to Start a Teaching Program"	January 18, 2012
74	"Budoy Thinks That BJ Is Keeping a Secret about His Real Parents"	January 19, 2012
75	"BJ Hopes to Reunite His Whole Family"	January 20, 2012
76	"Budoy Comes Closer to Danger While Digging Up Grace's Past"	January 23, 2012
77	"Grace Protects BJ the Best She Can"	January 24, 2012
78	"Grace Threatens Anton with His Secret"	January 25, 2012
Grace blackmails Anton with their shared secret so she could have BJ. Because of this, Anton discourages Luisa from severing ties with Grace. Grace lets Luisa know that she will not give up her right over BJ. Meanwhile, Budoy tells Elena and Rene his suspicion about Grace's involvement in his disappearance years ago.
79	"Budoy Wants to Get Close to Rico to Know More about the Kidnapping"	January 26, 2012
Anton and Grace hold on to their threats to keep each other quiet about their secrets. Anton tells Isaac to compromise his feelings for their family's sake. Bent on uncovering the truth, Budoy goes to Pampanga to investigate on his own and discovers shocking information from Rico.
80	"Budoy Deals with the Truth about His Father"	January 27, 2012
Budoy finally discovers the real culprit behind his kidnapping years ago. Meanwhile, rattled by Budoy's discovery, Anton decides to go away to rethink his plans.
81	"Budoy Wants to Know If His Father Really Had Him Kidnapped"	January 30, 2012
Budoy finds the answers he has been looking for from Anton's medical files of him. Budoy confronts Anton about this, but Anton admits the truth only to Luisa.
82	"Anton Denies His Involvement in Kidnapping Budoy"	January 31, 2012
Anton struggles to defend himself from Luisa and Elena's doubts about him. To his grief, Anton learns that Budoy is suffering from an illness that threatens to take away Budoy's life.
83	"Will Budoy Get Better Again?"	February 1, 2012
84	"What Will Grace Do After Discovering Who Really Had Budoy Kidnapped?"	February 2, 2012
85	"Luisa Is Determined to File a Case for Budoy"	February 3, 2012
86	"Luisa Sets Budoy's Escape Plan"	February 6, 2012
87	"BJ Realizes the Roots of His Problems"	February 7, 2012
Budoy and Luisa's lives are put in danger when Henry's group intercepts their escape. Isaac suspects Grace and BJ of having connections with Henry. BJ learns that Henry almost killed Luisa. Budoy regains consciousness, but has regressed to his former self and with no memories of recent events.
88	"Budoy's Brain Returns to Its Previous State"	February 8, 2012
Anton, Elena, and Jackie learn that Budoy's brain surgery does not guarantee him full recovery. Rico abandons Anton. Guilt drives Alberta to confess the truth to Budoy and leave him a sizeable amount of the Maniego fortune in her will.
89	"Grace Can't Accept That BJ Will Get Less Inheritance Than Budoy"	February 9, 2012
90	"Budoy Reacts to Luisa's Filed Case"	February 10, 2012
91	"The Maniego Family Starts to Fall Apart"	February 13, 2012
The Maniego's stained reputation threatens their business and medical practice. Budoy's testimonies in court weaken the Maniegos' defense. Luisa regains consciousness.
92	"Budoy Continues to Wish Wellness for Her Mom"	February 14, 2012
Luisa's injury has affected her speech. Luisa's improved condition forces Grace to expose her strongest evidence against the Maniegos.
93	"The Court Is Filled with Drama as Luisa and Budoy Barge Their Way Into the Hearing"	February 15, 2012
Budoy helps Luisa withdraw her charges against the Maniegos. Alberta pleads guilty. Despite Budoy's efforts, the court sentences Anton, Isaac, and Alberta to imprisonment.
94	"Anton Wants to Make Sure That Grace Pays for Her Schemes"	February 16, 2012
95	"Will Grace Have Her Hands in Alberta's Will?"	February 17, 2012
96	"Grace Thinks of Another Grand Scheme"	February 20, 2012
97	"BJ Wants to Be in Good Terms with Jackie"	February 21, 2012
98	"What Will Grace's Next Step Be?"	February 22, 2012
Budoy decides to ask for Jackie's hand in marriage. Henry devices a plan to get BJ using Jackie as bait.
99	"Everybody Is on Their Feet When Jackie Got Kidnapped"	February 23, 2012
Questioning his two impostor mothers, Budoy learns about their lies and decides to look for Olga to know who his real mother is. Meanwhile, Mannequin Reynes returns to being a mannequin causing Estalon's heartbreak.
100	"Budoy and BJ Team Up to Free Jackie"	February 24, 2012
Budoy decides to leave his job at the radio station to look for his parents. Gigi finds about Maximo's plans to get rid of Budoy once and for all, and Estalon meets two mysterious men.
101	"Budoy Suffers After Failing to Save Jackie"	February 27, 2012
102	"Budoy Does Everything He Can to Save BJ and Jackie"	February 28, 2012
Senyora, who is taking voice lessons from Budoy, starts looking for ways to keep track of Budoy without Gigi. Maximo, on the other hand, continues assuming different personalities to get around Barangay San Roque.
103	"BJ Tries to Escape to Help Jackie"	February 29, 2012
Maximo finally recognizes Budoy. Meanwhile, the Bulacan Boys chase Chris away from Julia, and Budoy is unknowingly held at gunpoint by a disguised Maximo.
104	"The Culprits Are Apprehended While the Innocent Are Exonerated"	March 1, 2012
Maximo almost succeeds in killing Budoy, but is stopped by the Bulacan Boys. Meanwhile, Senyora finds a way to help Budoy out. Later on, Maximo and Budoy interact twice.
105	"Jackie Leaves Budoy Devastated After Turning Down His Proposal"	March 2, 2012
Senyora figures out that the man claiming to be Budoy's father is Maximo in disguise, and gets Budoy as her voice coach in order to help and protect him.
106	"Budoy Runs Away to Ask Jackie to Reconsider His Proposal"	March 5, 2012
Jackie finds a way to make up to Budoy. Grace escapes from prison with Duke and Rico's help.
107	"Jackie Reminds Budoy How Special Their Friendship Is"	March 6, 2012
Jackie tries to bring back the friendship she and Budoy used to have. Grace fakes her death. BJ lets Budoy know that he loves Jackie.
108	"Budoy Can't Believe That BJ Kissed Jackie"	March 7, 2012
Budoy harbors resentment over BJ and Jackie's possible reconciliation. Despite feeling sorry for Budoy, BJ remains determined to fight for Jackie's love. On the other hand, Jackie wishes not to cause the brothers any more pain and decides to leave the country.
109	"Budoy Let Go of Jackie for BJ"	March 8, 2012
Budoy gives way to BJ and lets him marry Jackie. Jackie bears her and BJ's first-born, Benjo. After several years, Duke takes revenge on Grace for betraying him, by taking away the lives of the people she loves.
110	"Finale"	March 9, 2012
Budoy promises to take care of Benjo. Losing BJ takes its toll on Grace. Nevertheless, Isaac remains true to his love for her. After a year, Budoy finally fulfills a dream that becomes his devotion. He became as a priest of the Roman Catholic Church become as Fr. Budoy was also known as Reverend Father Benjamin Maniego.
