= Star in the Hood EP Vol. 1 =

EP by Tinchy Stryder
- Released: June 2009
- Recorded: 2009
- Genre: Grime
- Label: Takeover Entertainment Limited
- Producer: Prince Rapid

Tinchy Stryder chronology
Tinchy Stryder vs. Maniac (2008)	Star in the Hood EP Vol. 1 (2009)	Star in the Hood EP Vol. 2 (2009)

Star in the Hood EP Vol. 1 is the second extended play (EP) by recording artist Tinchy Stryder. It was released in June 2009 by Takeover Entertainment prior to the release of Stryder's second solo studio album, Catch 22. The EP is the first of a two-part free downloadable EP. Its cover art is a photo taken during the Catch 22 promo shoot.

== Track listing ==
No.	Title	Writer(s)	Producer(s)	Length
1.	"Toddla2"	Kwasi Danquah III	Prince Rapid	4:12
2.	"Fastlane"	Kwasi Danquah III	P. Rapid	3:13
3.	"100%"	Kwasi Danquah III	P. Rapid	3:39
4.	"Darker" (featuring Rapid)	Kwasi Danquah III, P. Rapid	P. Rapid	3:17
5.	"Do It My Way"	Kwasi Danquah III	P. Rapid	3:04
6.	"Follow (Live)"	Kwasi Danquah III	P. Rapid	3:15
