= Cloud 9 The EP =

EP by Tinchy Stryder
- Released: 31 March 2008
- Recorded: 2007–08
- Genre: Grime; bassline
- Length: 31:04 (UK Version); 26:56 (U.S. Version)
- Label: Takeover Entertainment Limited

Tinchy Stryder chronology
Star in the Hood (2007)	Cloud 9 The EP (2008)	Tinchy Stryder vs. Maniac (2008)

Cloud 9 The EP is the first extended play (EP) by recording artist Tinchy Stryder, and his fourth solo release to date. It was released on 31 March 2008 by Takeover Entertainment exclusively to iTunes UK store and U.S. store on 29 May 2011. Its cover art is a dark painting taken during the Star in the Hood promo shoot. The track, "Sorry, You Are?", featuring Chipmunk, from Stryder's 2007 debut studio album Star in the Hood, was included on the EP as track #2.

== Track listing ==
No.	Title	Writer(s)	Producer(s)	Length
1.	"Full Effect"	Kwasi Danquah III, Brandon "Maniac" Jolie	B. Jolie	2:56
2.	"Sorry, You Are?" (featuring Chipmunk)	Kwasi Danquah III, B. Jolie	B. Jolie	2:50
3.	"Six 4 Fire"	Kwasi Danquah III, B. Jolie	B. Jolie	3:05
4.	"Line Em Up"	Kwasi Danquah III, Paul "DJ Scholar" Oketcho	P. Oketcho	3:20
5.	"Thump" (featuring Nav)	Kwasi Danquah III, Rami Afuni	R. Afuni	4:24
6.	"Sick In The Head"	Kwasi Danquah III, Joseph "Skepta" Adenuga	J. Adenuga	2:54
7.	"16 Writers" (featuring Fuda Guy)	Kwasi Danquah III, Alex Armenis	The 44 Movement	4:25
8.	"Watch Ur Back" (featuring Dirty Danger)	Kwasi Danquah III, David "Dirty Danger" Nkrumah	D. Nkrumah	3:05
9.	"My 95s" (featuring Rapid)	Kwasi Danquah III, Prince Rapid	P. Rapid	4:05

US Version
No.	Title	Writer(s)	Producer(s)	Length
1.	"Full Effect"	Kwasi Danquah III, Brandon "Maniac" Jolie	B. Jolie	2:56
2.	"Sorry, You Are?" (featuring Chipmunk)	Kwasi Danquah III, B. Jolie	B. Jolie	2:50
3.	"Line Em Up"	Kwasi Danquah III, Paul "DJ Scholar" Oketcho	P. Oketcho	3:20
4.	"Thump" (featuring Nav)	Kwasi Danquah III, Rami Afuni	R. Afuni	4:24
5.	"Sick In The Head"	Kwasi Danquah III, Joseph "Skepta" Adenuga	J. Adenuga	2:54
6.	"16 Writers" (featuring Fuda Guy)	Kwasi Danquah III, Alex Armenis	The 44 Movement	4:25
7.	"Watch Ur Back" (featuring Dirty Danger)	Kwasi Danquah III, David "Dirty Danger" Nkrumah	D. Nkrumah	3:05
8.	"Do It My Way" (featuring Wiley)	Kwasi Danquah III, Richard "Wiley" Cowie	R. Cowie	3:02
