= Mainstream Money =

Single by Tinchy Stryder

from the album Star in the Hood
- Released: 12 November 2007
- Recorded: 2006–07
- Genre: Grime
- Length: 3:20
- Label: Takeover Entertainment Limited
- Songwriter(s): Kwasi Danquah III (Composer); Maniac (Lyricist)
- Producer(s): Maniac

Tinchy Stryder singles chronology
"Something About Your Smile" (2007)	"Mainstream Money" (2007)	"Stryderman" (2008)

"Mainstream Money" is the third and final single from grime vocalist Tinchy Stryder's debut album, Star in the Hood. The single was released in November 2007. The song was written and produced by renowned grime music producer Maniac, who has claimed that the instrumental for the track is the one he is most proud of. The song was also notable for being heard on the BBC soap "EastEnders" several times in late 2007. The track "Sorry, You Are?" was also released as part of the single. It features vocals from fellow rapper Chipmunk, and later featured as a hidden track on Star in the Hood, and also appeared on Cloud 9: The EP.

== Music video ==
A music video was made for the song, and was uploaded to YouTube on Sunday, 7 October 2007, at a total length of three minutes and thirty seconds. The video was also shown on British satellite music channel Channel U. The video was filmed in Bow, East London, UK, and finds Stryder chopping out his rhymes over big drum & base and big beats in different locations of a council estate cut with scenes with the grime collective Ruff Sqwad for an added ghetto touch.

== Track listing ==
Digital Download / 12" Vinyl

1. "Mainstream Money"
2. "Mainstream Money" (Mainiac Instrumental)
3. "Sorry, You Are?"
4. "Sorry, You Are?" (Mainiac Instrumental)
