= List of Guns and Roses (TV series) episodes =

Guns and Roses is a Philippine action drama romance series that aired on ABS-CBN from June 6, 2011, to September 23, 2011, replacing Mara Clara starring Robin Padilla, Bea Alonzo and Diether Ocampo.

This is Robin Padilla's second action primetime series in the network, following the television series Basta't Kasama Kita, which concluded eight years ago. This is the first team up with Bea Alonzo as his leading lady and Diether Ocampo in a TV Production. The TV series concluded with 80 episodes and was replaced by Budoy on its timeslot.

== Series overview ==
Year	Episode numbers	Episodes	First aired	Last aired
2011	1–80	80	June 6, 2011	September 23, 2011

== Episodes ==
No.	Title	Original release date
1	"Pilot"	June 6, 2011
2	"Abel Chooses to Bring Justice to His Own Hands"	June 7, 2011
3	"Reign Tries to Forget Her Problem with the Help of Alcohol"	June 8, 2011
4	"Abel Hunts Down One by One Those Who Are Responsible for His Father's Death"	June 9, 2011
5	"Abel Makes Sure That Intalan Suffers as Well in the End"	June 10, 2011
6	"Abel and Reign Get Close in an Unusual Way"	June 13, 2011
7	"Abel Becomes Fond of Reign Which Stops Him from Dispatching Her"	June 14, 2011
8	"Rather Than Escaping, Reign Opts to Stay and Take Care of Abel"	June 15, 2011
9	"In a Sudden Change of Events, the Hostage-Taker Protects His Prisoner"	June 16, 2011
10	"Reign Seem to Be Unhappier After Being Rescued"	June 17, 2011
11	"When Will Abel and Reign See Each Other Again?"	June 20, 2011
12	"Reign Is Questioned a Lot About Her Abduction"	June 21, 2011
13	"Reign Falls Into Abel's Arms Again"	June 22, 2011
14	"Abel and Marcus Put Their Best Foot Forward to Befriend Reign"	June 23, 2011
15	"The Race for Reign's Heart Between Abel and Marcus Begins"	June 24, 2011
16	"Abel Seeks Out the True Intention of Marcus Toward Reign"	June 27, 2011
17	"A Mysterious Girl Tries to Sabotage Reign"	June 28, 2011
18	"Reign's Life Will Be More Complicated Because of Her New Rival, Claire"	June 29, 2011
19	"Abel and Reign Both Has Problems in Letting Go of Their Love"	June 30, 2011
20	"Is It Too Late for Abel to Leave His Criminal Past Behind?"	July 1, 2011
21	"Meeting Reign Soon Appear to Be a Mistake as Abel Runs Away Not Only from Marcus But from Onat as Well"	July 4, 2011
22	"Reign Lets Go of Her Desire for Love for a While as She Fixes Her Family Problems"	July 5, 2011
23	"Abel Can Resolve to the Worst Things Just to Keep His Dark Secret from Onat"	July 6, 2011
24	"Everybody Needs to Be on the Good Side of Don Lucio"	July 7, 2011
25	"Abel Concentrates on Trying to Be a Part of Don Lucio's Endeavors"	July 8, 2011
26	"What Is Reign's Real Connection to Don Lucio?"	July 11, 2011
27	"Bartolome Covers Up His Tracks the Soonest He Can"	July 12, 2011
28	"Abel Makes Sure That Reign Won't Get in the Way from Finishing His Ultimate Mission"	July 13, 2011
29	"Abel Thinks That He Has the Upper Hand After Taking in His Hostage"	July 14, 2011
30	"Abel Freaks Out After Learning That There Is a Price for Reign's Head"	July 15, 2011
31	"Reign's Fondness with Abel Grows Into a Deeper Affection"	July 18, 2011
32	"Reign Tries to Understand How Abel Is Connected to Paolo"	July 19, 2011
33	"Marcus Tries to Exonerate King to Be in Touch with Reign Again"	July 20, 2011
34	"Abel Can't Wait to Get His Hands at Bartolome"	July 21, 2011
35	"Is Reign God's Sign for Abel to Abandon His Mission?"	July 22, 2011
36	"Reign or Revenge?"	July 25, 2011
37	"Diana Gets to Abel's Heart Through His Stomach"	July 26, 2011
38	"Dolor Must Find the Courage to Face Her Past"	July 27, 2011
39	"Don Lucio Expresses His Anger and Disgust to Diana"	July 28, 2011
40	"More Issues Are Resolved as Abel, Marcus, Reign, Onat and Joni Camp Out to Find Dolor"	July 29, 2011
41	"Marcus Makes Sure That Reign Will End Up with Her"	August 1, 2011
42	"Marcus Pretends to Be Reign's Kidnapper to Win Her Over"	August 2, 2011
43	"Reign Is Very Excited with the Idea That Her Kidnapper Wants to Get in Touch with Her Again"	August 3, 2011
44	"Abel Makes Sure That No One Can Spy on Him"	August 4, 2011
45	"Reign Meets Up with the Disguised Marcus"	August 5, 2011
46	"Reign Gets into Deep Conversation with Marcus' Mother"	August 8, 2011
47	"Will Abel Agree to Aretha's Plans?"	August 9, 2011
48	"Abel Comes Across a Surprise Obstacle in His Mission, his brother, Onat"	August 10, 2011
49	"Diana Finds a Perfect Way to Overcome Her Depression"	August 11, 2011
50	"What Good Will Abel and Bartolome's Team Up Bring?"	August 12, 2011
51	"A Traitor Is Breathing Within Enemy Lines"	August 15, 2011
52	"Abel Continues to Be a Double Agent to Ultimately Be with Reign"	August 16, 2011
53	"Abel Fights for His Life as He Struggles to Get Out of Bartolome's Hands"	August 17, 2011
54	"Bart Comes to Kevin's Aid After He Blacks Out"	August 18, 2011
55	"Life Might Not Be What Abel Expected After He Finishes His Mission"	August 19, 2011
56	"Can Abel Have a Clean Slate After All of the Bad Things He Did?"	August 22, 2011
57	"Will Onat Arrest His Brother?"	August 23, 2011
58	"How Will Onat Deal with the Fact That His Brother Is a Criminal?"	August 24, 2011
59	"Marcus Can't Believe That Aretha Is Conniving with Abel"	August 25, 2011
60	"Because of His Mother's Death, Marcus Is More Determined Than Ever to Enjail Abel"	August 26, 2011
61	"Abel Remains Hidden Although Tremendously Worrying about His Mom"	August 29, 2011
62	"Will Reign Be Persuaded in Believing That Abel Is a Cold Blooded Criminal?"	August 30, 2011
63	"Will Reign Meet Up with Abel?"	August 31, 2011
64	"Marcus Wonders How Abel Escaped"	September 1, 2011
65	"Abel Chooses to Trust No One"	September 2, 2011
66	"Abel Visits His Father"	September 5, 2011
67	"Abel Is Confused Why Reign Is with Marcus"	September 6, 2011
68	"Abel Finally Meets Señor"	September 7, 2011
69	"Will Reign Choose Her Family Over Abel?"	September 8, 2011
70	"Abel Must Find a Way to Save Franco and Mac-Mac"	September 9, 2011
71	"Who Will Philip (Tsong) Try to Persuade to Get Him Out of Prison?"	September 12, 2011
72	"Reign Works Hand in Hand with Abel in His Mission to Exonerate Him as Soon as Possible"	September 13, 2011
73	"Reign and Joni Devices a Plan to Prove Their Father's Involvement in Crimes"	September 14, 2011
74	"Lucio Suffers the Repercussions of His Wrongdoings"	September 15, 2011
75	"Abel Promises to Avenge His Father"	September 16, 2011
76	"Will Lucio Surrender to the Police for His Family?"	September 19, 2011
77	"Abel Has Lucio at Gunpoint"	September 20, 2011
78	"Will Abel Be Able to Escape and Redeem Himself?"	September 21, 2011
79	"Onat and Abel Work Together to Catch the Real Bad Guys"	September 22, 2011
80	"Finale"	September 23, 2011
