= Balotelli (disambiguation) =

Mario Balotelli (born 1990) is an Italian footballer.

Balotelli may also refer to:

- Jonathan Balotelli (born 1989), Brazilian footballer
- Alexandre Balotelli (born 1993), Brazilian footballer
- Mario Balotelli (song), a 2012 song by grime crew Ruff Sqwad
