= Takeover/Cloud 9 =

Takeover/Cloud 9 Unltd.
- Company type: Joint venture Private unlimited company
- Industry: Music industry
- Founded: December 2008
- Founder: Kwasi Danquah III & Guy Moot
- Headquarters: London, United Kingdom
- Key people: Kwasi Danquah III (President and CEO)
- Services: Music publishing
- Owner: Takeover Group; EMI Music Publishing
- Parent: Takeover Entertainment Limited & EMI Music Publishing

Takeover/Cloud 9 is a British music publishing company. The organisation is a co-owned subsidiary of Takeover Entertainment Ltd and EMI Music Publishing. It was founded by English rapper Kwasi Danquah III (commonly known as Tinchy Stryder) and EMI Music Publishing's UK president and EMI European creative president, Guy Moot, as a publishing arm solely for Danquah's music in December 2008.

== History ==
=== 2008-2009: Formation ===
In 2008 Danquah signed a joint venture publishing deal with EMI Music Publishing to create Takeover/Cloud 9, a global publishing company in partnership with EMI.

=== 2009-2010 ===
In 2009, Takeover/Cloud 9 became the publishing arm for all musicians and record producers of Takeover Entertainment. The singles from the certified Gold studio album, Catch 22: "Take Me Back", and #1's "Never Leave You", and the N-Dubz collaboration "Number 1", were all published by Takeover/Cloud 9.

=== 2010-present ===
In June 2010, Takeover Entertainment went into business with Jay-Z by signing a joint venture with Jay-Z's Roc Nation to create a European record label and entertainment company. The new company was named Takeover Roc Nation. By this, Takeover/Cloud 9 also became the music publishing arm for Takeover Roc Nation.

== See also ==
- Takeover Entertainment
- EMI Music Publishing
