= Star in the Hood =

Star in the Hood may refer to:

- Star in the Hood (album), a 2007 album by Tinchy Stryder
- Star in the Hood (company), the fashion company
