= New Age Grime =

Compilation album by Maniac
- Released: 29 June 2009
- Recorded: 2008–09
- Genre: Grime
- Label: Ghetto Platinum Productions

Maniac chronology
Tinchy Stryder vs. Maniac (2008)	New Age Grime (2009)

New Age Grime is an album by Maniac, released after his split vocal and instrumental collaboration with Tinchy Stryder Tinchy Stryder vs. Maniac, it represented Maniac's first and only solo instrumental LP. The album was well received in the Grime scene and has been recognised as one of the best examples of Grime as an instrumental genre.

== Track listing ==
No.	Title	Length
1.	"Ugly"	4:01
2.	"Slap In The Face"	3:49
3.	"Wobble"	3:18
4.	"Ouch"	3:58
5.	"G.R.I.M.E."	3:30
6.	"Captain"	3:46
7.	"Boiler"	3:36
8.	"Gun Slap"	4:11
9.	"Evil Dead"	3:47
10.	"Skeng'd Out"	3:17
11.	"Grinding"	3:30
12.	"Oxygen"	3:45
13.	"Head Shot"	3:31
14.	"Thug"	3:29
