= 2012 (Ruff Sqwad EP) =

EP by Ruff Sqwad
- Released: 24 January 2012
- Recorded: 2011
- Genre: Grime: hip hop
- Length: 47:03
- Label: Takeover Entertainment Limited
- Producers: David Nkrumah & Prince Rapid (also executive); G.Tank; Rowntree

Ruff Sqwad chronology
Guns 'n' Roses Vol. 2 (2006)	2012 (2012)	White Label Classics (2012)

Singles from 2012
- 1. "This Side" Released: 14 October 2011; 2. "R.S.M.D Remix" Released: 20 November 2011; 3. "Mario Balotelli" Released: 24 January 2012; 4. "Dat's How I Like It" Released: 27 January 2012

2012 is an EP by grime music collective Ruff Sqwad. It was released on 24 January 2012 by Takeover Entertainment for free download. The project was intended as a precursor to the group's third studio album Guns and Roses Volume 3, which was then slated for a late 2012 release but was ultimately scrapped.

The EP's cover art is a cyberart image of interstellar medium and estrasolar system coordinates, formatted curvilinear coordinates in grey with the color blue as a background.

== Background and recording ==
The 2012 EP came after the success of the song "Mario Balotelli", which was included on Tinchy Stryder's fifth extended play, The Wish List (2011). It includes guest appearances from prominent grime artists Jme and D Double E.

== Reception ==
Reviewing the project for MTV News, Maz Khan noted its sonic similarities to previous Ruff Sqwad projects, remarking that "it seems like they’ve stuck to a formula that they know works. So, regardless of the fact that it may sound a little 2010/11, it’s a sturdy offering scattered with beats that will make you bop your head and lyrics that will make you rewind from time to time".

== Track listing ==
No.	Title	Producer(s)	Length
1.	"Lights On"		4:47
2.	"R.S.M.D Remix" (featuring Roachee, Stutta, Lee Brasco and Young C)	Dirty Danger	4:51
3.	"Dat's How I Like It" (featuring Jme)	Prince Rapid	3:04
4.	"Think"		3:16
5.	"Mario Balotelli"	G.Tank	4:25
6.	"Coming"	David Nkrumah	4:41
7.	"This Side"	Prince Rapid	3:26
8.	"Journey" (featuring D Double E)		3:24
9.	"Anna 2"	Dirty Danger	3:32
10.	"Hectic Projective Flo"		4:02
11.	"SOS"	Rowntree	3:48
12.	"Headlines (They Know)"		3:47
