= Something About Your Smile =

Single by Tinchy Stryder featuring Cyleena Cymone

from the album Star in the Hood
- Released: 6 August 2007
- Recorded: 2006–07
- Genre: Pop; pop-rap; grime
- Length: 4:40
- Label: Takeover Entertainment Limited
- Songwriter(s): Kwasi Danquah III (composer); Cylena Cymone (co-lyricist); DaVinChe (co-lyricist)
- Producer(s): DaVinChe

Tinchy Stryder singles chronology
"Breakaway" (2007)	"Something About Your Smile" (2007)	"Mainstream Money" (2007)

"Something About Your Smile" is a single by grime vocalist Tinchy Stryder, released as the second single from his debut album, Star in the Hood on 6 August 2007. The song features guest vocals from British singer-songwriter, Cylena Cymone, and was well received by the grime scene. The song was composed by Stryder, and written by Cylena Cymone and DaVinChe, and produced by DaVinChe.

== Music video ==
Tinchy Stryder in a scene dancing alongside the lip-synching female in one of the scenes in the music video for "Something About Your Smile".

A music video was made to accompany the release of "Something About Your Smile". It was first released onto YouTube by Takeover Entertainment Ltd, on Thursday 5 July 2007, at a total length of three minutes and forty-five seconds. The music video is set in computer-generated imagery and sees Tinchy Stryder’s ability to bring an upbeat and unique pop rap angle to his original grime sound, he then proceeds with rhymes over a melodic beat, cheeky lyrics and catchy hook. Although the song vocals are of Cylena Cymone, she does not feature in the video. A female in the video lip-syncs over Cylena Cymone's vocals, then Stryder begins to dance alongside the female lip-synching the song, then a few females later appear in the video dancing. The producer of the song DaVinChe and a few members of Ruff Sqwad make a cameo in the video. The video has thus far reached over 2 million views as of Monday 17 October 2011.

== Track listing ==
No.	Title	Length
1.	"Something About Your Smile" (Radio Edit)	3:51
2.	"Something About Your Smile" (Explicit Version)	4:44
3.	"Mainstream Money" (Album Version)	3:26
4.	"Sick in da Head" (Album Version)	2:56
