= Goji (disambiguation) =

Goji refers to the fruit of Lycium barbarum and Lycium chinense, two very closely related species of boxthorn in the family Solanaceae.

Goji may also refer to:

- Goji Electronics, a brand of computer, smartphone, audio products and equipment
- Goji Sakamoto (1944–2018), Japanese politician of the Liberal Democratic Party
- Gouqi jiu, varieties of Chinese alcoholic beverage
- Tappeh Goji, a village in Iran
