= Lost and Found (Tinchy Stryder mixtape) =

Mixtape by Tinchy Stryder
- Released: 24 October 2006
- Recorded: 2006
- Genre: Grime
- Label: Boy Better Know
- Producer: Kwasi Danquah III

Tinchy Stryder chronology
I'm Back U Know (2006)	Lost and Found (2006)	Star in the Hood (2007)

Lost and Found is the second of 3 mixtapes by Tinchy Stryder, It was released on 24 October 2006 on the label Boy Better Know. The mixtape sees Stryder rapping with Wiley, who featured on Stryders first mixtape, I'm Back U Know, and the mixtape also features a few members of Ruff Sqwad. It features a collection of 14 unreleased tracks that had never been heard before the release of the mixtape, and Underground which was released in 2005.

== Track listing ==
No.	Title	Length
1.	"Jump"	2:57
2.	"Paper Boy"	2:56
3.	"Underground"	2:30
4.	"Perfect World"	3:40
5.	"On The Grind" (featuring Fuda Guy)	4:17
6.	"Summertime" (featuring Wiley and Dirty Danger)	3:50
7.	"Listen"	2:07
8.	"I Think I Know Him" (featuring Dirty Danger)	3:19
9.	"24 Hours To Live"	3:36
10.	"Cycle"	4:03
11.	"Nah Fam" (featuring Dillusion, Souljah Kid and Fuda Guy)	3:16

Bonus Tracks
No.	Title	Length
12.	"For The Game"	3:04
13.	"Listen Carefully"	3:34
14.	"Changes"	2:59
15.	"Boom"	2:52
