= Tinchy Stryder vs. Maniac =

Studio album by Tinchy Stryder vs. Maniac
- Released: 24 November 2008
- Recorded: 2007–2008
- Genre: Grime, bassline
- Label: Eskibeat Recordings
- Producer: Brandon Jolie (Record executive & Co-Composer); Kwasi Danquah III (Co-Composer & Lyricist)

Tinchy Stryder chronology
Cloud 9 The EP (2008)	Tinchy Stryder vs. Maniac (2008)	Star in the Hood EP Vol. 1 (2009)

Maniac chronology
Tinchy Stryder vs. Maniac (2008)	New Age Grime (2009)

Singles from Tinchy Stryder vs. Maniac
- 1. "Rollin" Released: October 2008

Tinchy Stryder vs. Maniac is a collaborative studio album by recording artist Tinchy Stryder and grime record producer Maniac. The album produced one single, "Rollin Remix", and is most noted for bringing Maniac's productions to a wider audience.

== Track listing ==
No.	Title	Length
1.	"Warm Up"	2:03
2.	"Wait Till the Moon Comes Out"	2:47
3.	"Fly Away"	2:56
4.	"Rollin'" (featuring Delusion)	3:19
5.	"No Cape" (featuring Fuda Guy)	3:17
6.	"Pray for Me"	3:27
7.	"Mandem" (instrumental)	3:43
8.	"Snake Bite" (instrumental)	4:13
9.	"Grime Kid" (instrumental)	3:16
10.	"Star in the Making (remix)" (instrumental)	3:48
11.	"What Da Rass" (instrumental)	3:15
12.	"Warzone" (instrumental)	3:59

Bonus tracks
No.	Title	Length
13.	"E3 Shank Shank" (featuring God's Gift)	3:03
14.	"Rollin' Remix" (featuring Roachee)	3:27

== Personnel ==
Credits for Eskibeat Recordings Presents: Tinchy Stryder vs. Maniac.

- Brandon "Maniac" Jolie – record executive, producer, arrange, mixing, music and instrumentation
- Kwasi "Tinchy Stryder" Danquah III – lyrics, music and vocals
