= I'm Back U Know =

Mixtape by Tinchy Stryder
- Released: 2 March 2006
- Recorded: 2006
- Genre: Grime
- Label: Boy Better Know
- Producer: Kwasi Danquah III

Tinchy Stryder chronology
Creeper Volume 2 (2004)	I'm Back U Know (2006)	Lost and Found (2006)

I'm Back U Know is the first of 3 mixtapes by Tinchy Stryder, It was released on 2 March 2006 on the label Boy Better Know. The mixtape sees Stryder rapping with big-name rappers such as Wiley, Kano and Flow Dan from the grime collective Roll Deep. Featuring 17 original productions with Stryder on the mic from start to finish with tracks including big grime hits such as "I'm Pro", "96 Bars" and "1 of them Days".

== Track listing ==
No.	Title	Length
1.	"Intro"	2:53
2.	"96 Bars"	3:02
3.	"Testing (Mic Check)"	2:05
4.	"I Understand It Clearly" (featuring Slix and Shifty)	2:24
5.	"I'm Livo"	1:42
6.	"Ground-Under"	1:37
7.	"New MC's"	4:04
8.	"Everybody's Gotta Learn" (featuring Fuda Guy)	3:47
9.	"Uptown Girl" (featuring Wiley)	3:07
10.	"1 Of Them Days"	2:05
11.	"Freestyle" (By Roachee)	1:46
12.	"I'm Pro"	2:10
13.	"Tippin'" (featuring Delusion)	3:53
14.	"Stryder"	3:47
15.	"Kabe" (featuring Dirty Danger)	3:28
16.	"Rudeboy Please"	2:56
17.	"Hustle Grind"	2:32
