= Guns and Roses Volume 1 =

Mixtape by Ruff Sqwad
- Released: 4 March 2005
- Recorded: 2004–2005
- Genre: Grime
- Label: Ruff Sqwad Recordings
- Producer: Prince Rapid & David Nkrumah (record executives)

Ruff Sqwad chronology
Guns and Roses Volume 1 (2005)	Guns and Roses Volume 2 (2006)

Guns and Roses Volume 1 is the debut mixtape by grime crew Ruff Sqwad. It was released in March 2005 on the independent record label Ruff Sqwad Recordings. It is considered to be one of the best mixtapes to come from the grime scene. The album is the first of a three-part album series.

== Track listing ==
No.	Title	Length
1.	"Intro"	—
2.	"When It's On"	—
3.	"1999"	—
4.	"Future"	—
5.	"Jampie (ft. Trim)"	—
6.	"Heat (ft. Lightnin)"	—
7.	"Move"	—
8.	"Style Up"	—
9.	"Wide"	—
10.	"Stryder's Back"	—
11.	"Gangster"	—
12.	"Wild Clipse (ft. Wiley Kat)"	—
13.	"Back 2 Basics"	—
14.	"Dirty"	—
15.	"Shake Your Bum"	—
16.	"Wake Keeping"	—
17.	"Ur Girls with Me"	—
18.	"Chemistry"	—
19.	"Jennifer"	—
20.	"Ice Cream (ft. Roachee)"	—
21.	"Cok, Aim, Shoot"	—
22.	"Woah!"	—
23.	"Guns & Roses"	—

- All lyrics are by the five members of Ruff Sqwad: Tinchy Stryder, Dirty Danger, Slix, Rapid, Shifty Rydos and frequent collaborator, Mad Max.
- All 23 tracks are produced by Ruff Sqwad members Prince Rapid & David "Dirty Danger" Nkrumah.
