= Guns and Roses Volume 2 =

Mixtape by Ruff Sqwad
- Released: 13 October 2006
- Recorded: 2005–2006
- Genre: Grime
- Label: Ruff Sqwad Recordings
- Producer: Prince Rapid & David Nkrumah (record executives)

Ruff Sqwad chronology
Guns and Roses Volume 1 (2005)	Guns and Roses Volume 2 (2006)

Guns and Roses Volume 2 is the second mixtape by grime crew Ruff Sqwad. It was released in October 2006 on the independent record label Ruff Sqwad Recordings. Like Guns and Roses Volume 1, it is considered one of the best mixtapes to emerge from the grime scene.

== Track listing ==
No.	Title	Length
1.	"Xtra"	3:42
2.	"War"	4:03
3.	"Cheque"	3:21
4.	"Nug"	2:54
5.	"Died in Ur Arms"	3:44
6.	"Money or Hate"	3:28
7.	"Tell Me" (feat. Alisha Bennett)	4:09
8.	"Clio" (feat. Young C)	3:36
9.	"U Don't Know"	3:03
10.	"How We Livin 1"	4:07
11.	"F'in Riddim"	3:14
12.	"Banga"	3:16
13.	"Killin Em" (feat. Words)	3:11
14.	"2016"	3:25
15.	"Alright"	2:30
16.	"Wot Would U Do?" (feat. Hazard)	3:17
17.	"Sometimes"	3:14
18.	"U Make Me Wanna"	3:14
19.	"Who's Da Best?"	2:49
20.	"Rebore"	3:15
21.	"Breath"	3:14
22.	"Sound Man"	4:07
23.	"London"	3:17

- All lyrics are by the seven members of Ruff Sqwad: Tinchy Stryder, Dirty Danger, Slix, Rapid, Shifty Rydos, Fuda Guy & DJ Scholar
- All 23 tracks are produced by Ruff Sqwad members Prince Rapid & David "Dirty Danger" Nkrumah
