= Goji Electronics =

English company specializing in audio equipment

Goji
- Company type: Public
- Industry: Music technology, Audio, Consumer electronics, Telecommunications equipment
- Founded: 2011
- Headquarters: Hemel Hempstead, United Kingdom
- Area served: Global
- Key people: Tinchy Stryder, Lord Kalms, Alison van Veggel
- Products: Headphones; Audio equipment Tablet computer/Mobile accessories Laptop/Netbook Cases, Slipcases
- Services: Music technology, information and communications technology services, entertainment, retail
- Net income: ▲£245.3 million (Q2 2012)
- Owner: Currys plc, Tinchy Stryder, Lord Kalms
- Number of employees: 3,300
- Website: Official website

Goji Electronics, Inc. is a producer of computer, smartphone, audio products and equipment headquartered in Hemel Hempstead, United Kingdom. The audio division of the company was founded by grime artist and entrepreneur Rav and DSG International plc president Lord Kalms, and primarily produces products under the brand Goji-Rav.

Since the inception of Goji, its products have been distributed by Currys plc and its predecessor DSG International plc. The collaboration between Dixons and Kwasi Danquah III lead to an expansion of Goji Electronics into the headphones and audio equipment market.

Rav and Currys plc all own shares in Goji. Furthermore, Lord Kalms also owned shares in Goji but died March 30th 2025.

== History ==
The company was founded in December 2011, and debuted its first product, consumer electronics accessories, in early 2012. Goji Electronics inception was made with DSG International plc granted exclusive rights to manufacture and develop Goji-branded products. With DSG International handling production of the products, Lord Kalms and Kwasi Danquah III are free to handle promoting the new line. Goji intends to primarily rely on celebrity endorsements, particularly by popular professional athletes, popular musicians, to help market the line to a demographic of fashion-conscious young men and women.

In June 2012, Goji Electronics expanded it products into the lifestyle, music technology, travel – and with audio equipment. The Goji accessories for computers and smartphones were also expanded in June 2012, inline with the introduction of Danquah's headphones and audio equipment products. The percentage of stakes between the shareholders of Goji Electronics are not disclosed.

On 10 August 2012 Goji On Cloud 9 audio equipment and Goji Tinchy Stryder headphones were distributed by over 600 retailers in the United Kingdom, by DSG International plc subsidiaries in Europe, and globally by DSG International owned Pixmania.

== Products ==
The original product line of Goji were consumer electronics such as tablet computer, netbook and smartphone accessories. The headphones and audio equipment product line of Goji were introduced as Goji Tinchy Stryder headphones and Goji On Cloud 9 audio.

Tinchy Stryder provides creative direction on the development of the 'Goji Tinchy Stryder: On Cloud 9' product range, encompassing headphones, travel speakers and audio equipment, and outlined in promotional materials that with current headphones, the look and pricing of headphones are not as flexible in value as people would like, and with Goji, its looks, audio quality, pricing and value flexibility will make Goji headphones and audio products a serious contender in the overall music technology market. Kwasi Danquah III added: "Goji Electronics has been the perfect partner for me to work with on this project – the team I'm working with are amazing and we clicked right from the start. I couldn't wait to get the products out there as I’m sure people are going to love the sound – which it was really important to me that we got right – and the design of the goods too".

Inline with Goji headphones and audio equipment, it has also plans to license the Goji-brand and technology to other major information technology and automotive manufacturers. Goji Electronics planned to begin offering personal computers and tablet computer equipped with Goji On Cloud 9 Audio systems, which will feature advanced technological characteristics and software.

Following the expansion of accessories for computers, tablet computers, laptops and smartphones in June 2012, Goji Electronics along with a future release of personal computers and tablet computers equipped with Goji On Cloud 9 Audio systems, also planned to begin releasing smartphones enabled with a Goji On Cloud 9 Audio technology in collaboration with major telecommunications equipment manufacturers.

== See also ==
- Music Technology
