= Star in the Hood (album) =

Studio album by Tinchy Stryder
- Released: 13 August 2007
- Recorded: 2006–07
- Genre: Grime
- Label: Takeover Entertainment
- Producer: DaVinChe; Dirty Danger; Goldielocks; Prince Rapid; Rapid; XTC

Tinchy Stryder chronology
Lost and Found (2006)	Star in the Hood (2007)	Cloud 9 The EP (2008)

Singles from Star in the Hood
- 1. "Breakaway" Released: 9 April 2007; 2. "Something About Your Smile" Released: 6 August 2007; 3. "Mainstream Money / Sorry, You Are?" Released: 12 November 2007

Star in the Hood is the debut studio album by British-Ghanaian rapper Tinchy Stryder. It was released on 13 August 2007 on Takeover Entertainment

== Critical reception ==
Maxine Headley of BBC Music claimed: "In the same way that hip hop's current state of health has been recently questioned, the debate of whether or not Grime has a future is generating many heated discussions. Prominent icons are seemingly moving away from the genre - Kano's doing the hip hop thing, Dizzie Rascal's collaborating with the MySpace successes, Lily Allen and Arctic Monkey's, to sustain mainstream interest, and the 'Godfather of Grime', Wiley, is retiring - the need for a new ally to march the movement forward is essential. Step up Tinchy Styder, who after several mix tapes finally releases his debut album, Star In The Hood, in an attempt to see if grime really does pay. And you know what, it just might. Yes, fans that have known Tinch from the beginning will hear him tone down his fiery musical 'tantrums' on some of the tracks, in order to obtain mass appeal. Looking no further than the DaVinChe produced single 'Something About Your Smile', its catchy hook and upbeat tempo has all the signs of a successful pop song. Really, there isn't anything wrong with that, Tinch hasn't totally deserted those who have made him a 'household name' in fact much of the lyrical content is still grimy, notably on 'Not Like Me' where he declares his originality as an artist, as with the title track 'Star In The Hood' claiming, well, the same thing. However the effort in 'keeping it real' on 'Catch 'Em' doesn't help dispel the current issues of how inner city youths get caught up in unnecessary life threatening altercations. Lucky, the inclusion of female vocals creates diversity on the album; 'Hands Of Time' with its reggae undertones and sentimental message show a softer side to Tinch, while 'Stereotypes' featuring and produced by Goldielocks, commands you not to assume 'we're some wasted kids, who aint got a clue about the music biz'. A Grime album wouldn't be a Grime album without a boisterous MC talking about his takeover of the world. Soldier on a mission, we salute you!"

== Singles ==
- "Breakaway" was released as the album's lead single on 9 April 2007.
- "Something About Your Smile" was released as the album's second single on 6 August 2007.
- "Mainstream Money" was released as a double A-side with "Sorry, You Are?", featuring Chipmunk, on 12 November 2007. The track also features on Stryder's Cloud 9 The EP.

== Track listing ==
No.	Title	Writer(s)	Producer(s)	Length
1.	"Star in the Hood" (Intro)	Kwasi Danquah III; David Nkrumah	Dirty Danger	1:57
2.	"Perfect Timing"	Danquah III; Chadley Chichester	DaVinChe	4:05
3.	"Breakaway" (featuring Funda)	Danquah III; Chichester	DaVinChe	4:24
4.	"Follow"	Danquah III; Nkrumah	Dirty Danger	4:25
5.	"Working for Days" (featuring Fuda Guy)	Danquah III; C. Ikenga; O. Ikenga	X.T.C	3:35
6.	"Hands of Time"	Danquah III; Prince Rapid	Prince Rapid	3:32
7.	"Catch 'Em" (featuring Dirty Danger & Shifty Rydos)	Danquah III; D. Nkrumah	Dirty Danger	3:04
8.	"Something About Your Smile" (featuring Cyleena Cymone)	Danquah III; Cyleena Cymone; Chicester	DaVinChe	4:40
9.	"Wonder"	Danquah III; Nkrumah	Dirty Danger	3:30
10.	"Dance 4 Now"	Danquah III; Nkrumah; Owusu	Dirty Danger; Prince Rapid	3:17
11.	"Stereotypes" (featuring Goldielocks)	Danquah III; Sarah Akwisombe	Goldielocks	4:04
12.	"Not Like Me"	Danquah III; Rapid	Prince Rapid	2:48
13.	"Rely on Me"	Danquah III; D. Nkrumah	Dirty Danger	4:06
14.	"Xtra" (featuring Ruff Sqwad) (bonus track)	Danquah III; Nkrumah; Rapid; Shifty Rydos; Slix; Fuda Guy	Prince Rapid	3:45
15.	"Mainstream Money" (bonus track)	Danquah III; Brandon Jolie	Maniac	3:20

== Personnel ==
- Tinchy Stryder – record executive
- David Nkrumah – sound engineer
- DaVinChe – mixing engineer
- Prince Rapid – mastering engineer
- Maniac – mastering engineer
