= Takeover Roc Nation =

American and British entertainment company

- Parent company: Takeover Entertainment Ltd; Roc Nation, LLC
- Founded: 2010
- Founder: Tinchy Stryder; Jay-Z
- Status: Inactive
- Distributor(s): Universal Music Distribution
- Genre: Various
- Location: Norwich (UK & E.U.); New York City (US)

Takeover Roc Nation was an American-British entertainment company, which acts as a co-owned subsidiary of Takeover Entertainment and Roc Nation. It was founded in June 2010 by American rapper and entrepreneur Shawn "Jay-Z" Carter and English rapper and entrepreneur Kwasi "Tinchy Stryder" Danquah III of the company, Takeover Entertainment Limited. The partnership was dissolved in 2013 with the shutdown of Takeover Entertainment.

== History ==
In June 2010, Carter and Roc Nation signed a joint venture deal with Danquah's company, Takeover Entertainment Limited, to create a European record label and entertainment company. The independent record label was named Takeover Roc Nation. It handled management, merchandise, records and live bookings for its recording artists. The company published music through Takeover/Cloud 9, distributed record releases through Sony Music Entertainment and partnered with Live Nation, StarRoc/Stargate and Three Six Zero Group for all other aspects of the business.

Takeover Roc Nation was headquartered at Danquah's Takeover Entertainment recording studio, in Norwich and London, UK with satellite offices at Carter's recording studio in Los Angeles, and Roc the Mic, in Manhattan, New York City, United States. In 2013, the joint venture dissolved as so Takeover Entertainment.

== See also ==
- List of record labels
