= Budoy =

2011 Philippine television series

- Title card
- Genre: Melodrama, Drama, Family, Advocacy
- Created by: ABS-CBN Studios
- Written by: Philip T. King; Arlene Tamayo
- Directed by: Ruel S. Bayani; Claudio "Tots" Sanchez-Mariscal IV
- Starring: Gerald Anderson; Jessy Mendiola; Enrique Gil
- Composer: George Canseco
- Country of origin: Philippines
- Original language: Filipino
- No. of episodes: 110 (list of episodes)

Production
- Executive producers: Carlo Katigbak; Cory Vidanes; Laurenti Dyogi; Roldeo T. Endrinal
- Producers: Eileen Angela T. Garcia; Jonathan Manalo
- Cinematography: Eli Balce; Roland Besa; Neil Daza
- Editor: Froilan Francia
- Running time: 30–45 minutes
- Production company: Dreamscape Entertainment Television

Original release
- Network: ABS-CBN
- Release: October 10, 2011 – March 9, 2012

Related
- May Bukas Pa; Dahil sa Pag-ibig

Budoy (Tagalog: [buˈdoɪ]) is a Philippine television drama series broadcast by ABS-CBN. Directed by Ruel S. Bayani and Claudio "Tots" Sanchez-Mariscal IV. It stars Gerald Anderson, Jessy Mendiola and Enrique Gil. It aired on the network's Primetime Bida line up and worldwide on TFC from October 10, 2011 to March 9, 2012, replacing Guns and Roses and first season of The Biggest Loser Pinoy Edition and was replaced by Dahil sa Pag-ibig.

It tackles the story of Budoy, who is mentally challenged, and his family, relationships and social issues. The theme song was "Saan Darating Ang Umaga" sung by Angeline Quinto produced by Jonathan Manalo.

== Series overview ==
Year	Episode numbers	Episodes	First aired	Last aired
2011	1–60	60	October 10, 2011	December 30, 2011
2012	61–110	50	January 2, 2012	March 9, 2012

== Plot ==
The story is about a renowned family of doctors, the Maniegos. Being very successful but having no children, Dr. Anton Maniego performs an artificial insemination on his wife Luisa. She gives birth to their child "Budoy". Budoy's birth brings joy to the family, but this turns into shame when they discover that Budoy is suffering from Angelman syndrome, which delays his intellectual development. Predicaments arise against Luisa, who becomes very protective of Budoy and the rest of the Maniego family. On Budoy's fifth birthday, he goes 'missing' after his grandmother gave him to a caretaker to save their family from shame. After Budoy's caretaker dies, Elena, the caretaker's hired maid for Budoy, adopts him and Budoy is now really missing as he and Elena left town. Meanwhile, to save Luisa's sanity, Grace, the wife of her brother-in-law, suggests to their family to present a fake Benjamin. Unbeknownst to them, the fake Benjamin "BJ" is in fact Grace's son.

Years later, Junjun is recently moved out of his other home with his guardian Elena. They later live with her father Renato and Budoy befriends Max. He works at university and finds his old friend Jackie and befriends BJ. Budoy learns that the school is going to kick him out because of an accident. So, at a party in BJ's house, Budoy speaks with people who work for BJ's father's company to give some money to donate so he can be able to go to college. Everything starts to be fine until BJ bragging that he and Jackie did it. Then they get accepted to Pilipinas IQ, a game show, so the school for special children can be built. They win, but Jackie is still upset with BJ. After they exit the game show, it starts raining. Jackie tries to run away from BJ since he wants to apologize. Budoy, who went to see the game show, followed them and tried to stop BJ from hurting Jackie. BJ hits Budoy knocking him out, and leaves him. Thunderstorms start growling, and Budoy later wakes up. He tries to find them but ends up falling and rolling down a hill. Then, his foot gets zapped and hits his head in a rock.

Weeks later, he luckily survives, but the Maniegos already figured out that Budoy was their real son and BJ isn't. This makes them more associated with Budoy, especially Jackie. Budoy starts recovering from Angelman syndrome, for example, looking directly and sometimes talking normally. Meanwhile, BJ gets in a car accident, but survives. He starts getting upset about the fact that Budoy keeps receiving the love of his parents. With Budoy out of the hospital, his parents decide that he would live with them. The more they are with Budoy, the more upset BJ gets. One day Budoy wanted to play with BJ, he started getting angry, throwing his beer causing a fire. Budoy starts panicking and later goes into a temporary state where he is focused. He gets a fire extinguisher and stopped the fire. BJ tried to talk to him and Budoy replied in a regular voice, then BJ knew he was starting to change. In order to uprise BJ's familial and academic bases, BJ and his biological mother, Grace devised plans to exile Budoy in the Maniego University and that's the start of secretive strategic battle of Budoy and BJ. Budoy decides to find BJ's mother with the help of his father's private investigator. Grace figures out and destroys Budoy's plan. BJ had enough of Budoy stealing everything, he intends to jump out of a building until he finds out the truth about his mother. Grace tells the truth that she is BJ's biological mother and kept the two a secret. His father tells him that his mother was dead. Budoy's intellectual capacity started to increase to that of a genius. He even got accepted to Pilipinas IQ when one of the participant from their college backed out. Budoy confessed his love to Jackie and they started a relationship. BJ continue to harness his hatred towards Budoy. Every plans he made to embarrass Budoy failed.

As the story goes, BJ realized that his father is still alive. He met Henry Chavez, an ex-convict and later a fugitive. BJ spends some time with his father and they set things up to pretend it to be a failed kidnap attempt for BJ to get back to the Maniegos while Henry conveys a plan to steal fortune from the Maniegos and get BJ and Grace to his side. As the series progresses, Budoy suffers from a severe headache which later turns out to be a brain tumor and he also investigates his kidnapping when he was 5 years old. The suspects include his godmother and father. Later, Budoy and his mother were shot while chasing Henry Chavez. Budoy returns to his old abnormal self, while Luisa cannot speak. During the trial, his grandmother admitted that she was the mastermind of Budoy's abduction and was sentenced to lifetime imprisonment while the Maniego brothers were imprisoned only for 6 months for obstruction of justice. The entire clan was freed, eventually Luisa also recovered from her injury. In the grass, Jackie was attacked by a snake. Budoy attacked the snake and at the same time, called BJ for help. At the hospital, Budoy witnessed BJ kissing Jackie which made him upset. Budoy, then underwent brain surgery and survived. BJ also apologizes for all the times he threatens Budoy after the surgery. During his birthday, Budoy, who finally accepts BJ as Jackie's boyfriend again, sets up their proposal during his birthday. Suddenly, Grace ruins the moment as she points the gun at Budoy. Jackie married BJ and gave birth to a son named Benjo, and Budoy was one of the sponsors (godfathers). BJ became a doctor of the Maniego Hospital. Eventually, a group of syndicates led by Duke abducted BJ and Jackie, who were eventually killed by a gunshot and Budoy promised to raise their son. Duke, in the other hand was killed by Grace. While Budoy was building as special school for children, Grace once again ruins the moment, as she abducted her own grandson and this time, she became very insane and claims that Benjo is BJ. In the end, Budoy provided education for mentally challenged children. Now, Budoy wished to be a priest of the Roman Catholic Church and became known as Fr. Budoy also known as Reverend Father Benjamin Maniego.

== Cast and characters ==
=== Main cast ===
- Gerald Anderson as Benjamin "Budoy" Maniego/Dizon, The main protagonist of the series. Born from a wealthy family of doctors, suffering from Angelman syndrome (caused by the failed IVF procedure by his own father), after less than 2 weeks of hospitalization he started giving a blank stare. A stare that gives off the impression that his mental capability is improving since his accident. He is childhood best friends with Jackie and has a crush on her. He is also best friends with Jackie's ex-boyfriend (and later husband) BJ, although they have been in bad terms. In the end, they (Budoy and BJ) reconciled with each other and finally accepted BJ to propose to Jackie during his birthday. He suffered from a severe brain tumor which he named "Tom-Tom", but his operation was successful. He is also the godfather of Jackie and BJ's baby Benjo. In the end, he provided education for mentally challenged children like him and raised Benjo as his son in response to BJ and Jackie's wish before they died. He became a priest of the Roman Catholic Church and is known as Rev. Fr. Benjamin Maniego or Father Budoy. He is Elena's adoptive son and guardian and Renato's adoptive grandson.
- Jessy Mendiola as Jacqueline "Jackie" Marasigan-Maniego, Budoy's childhood best friend and first girlfriend. She later becomes the wife of BJ where they have a son named Benjo. She is killed after being shot by Duke, a hitman.
- Enrique Gil as Benjamin "BJ" Maniego/Dimalanta/Chavez, Budoy's ex-best friend, foster brother and the anti-hero of the series. He became the opposer of Budoy when he learned of his real status in the Maniego family. He is the son of Grace and Henry and later husband of Jackie where they have a son named Benjo (Benjamin Maniego Jr.). He is killed after being shot by Duke having a deal where if Duke shoots him, he has to spare his family, which fails.

=== Supporting cast ===
- Janice de Belen as Elena Dizon, Budoy's adoptive mother and guardian and Renato's daughter.
- Tirso Cruz III as Dr. Antonio "Anton" Maniego, an obstetrician & gynecologist, husband of Luisa and father of Budoy, and the adoptive grandfather of Benjo.
- Zsa Zsa Padilla as Luisa Maniego, Anton's former secretary, current wife and the biological mother of Budoy and the adoptive grandmother of Benjo.
- Christian Vasquez as Dr. Isaac Maniego, a general pediatrician, youngest brother of Anton, the godfather of Budoy, granduncle of Benjo and husband of Grace.
- Mylene Dizon as Dr. Grace Maniego, the main antagonist of the series. A neurosurgeon and Isaac's wife. Also BJ's biological mother, Budoy's godmother and the paternal grandmother of Benjo Maniego.
- Barbara Perez as Dr. Alberta Maniego, a thoracic & cardiovascular surgeon, Anton and Isaac's mother, and Benjamin "Budoy's" grandmother and Benjo's adoptive great-grandaunt. She is sentenced to reclusion perpetua for kidnapping her own grandson, Budoy when he was a child but was eventually freed (along with the rest of the Maniego clan).
- Dante Rivero as Renato Dizon, Elena's father and Budoy's adoptive grandfather who helps in taking care of him.

=== Extended cast ===
- Mel Kimura as Myra, friend of Luisa.
- Malou Crisologo as Susan, secretary of Anton.
- Alexis Socorro L. Reyes as Dra. Barbara Sanchez (Ambassador of Autism Society of the Philippines) (Budoy's Doctor and Pediatrician).
- Ana Abad-Santos as Margaret Marasigan, Jackie's mother and Benjo's maternal grandmother and BJ's mother-in-law, she doesn't approve Budoy or BJ to be Jackie's boyfriend. She told her last words to Budoy that Jackie and BJ were kidnapped by the syndicates led by Duke.
- Bong Regala as Rico Fernando, friend of Anton.
- Bryan Termulo as Sam, friend and schoolmate of BJ.
- Greggy Santos as Ryan, friend and schoolmate of BJ.
- Ralph John Celis as Marcus, friend and schoolmate of BJ.
- Cris Villanueva as Henry Chavez, BJ's biological father, Benjo's biological grandfather and the leader of a syndicate but gets shot and dies.
- JV Kapunan as Captain of Cheering Squad
- Lui Manansala as Dr. Velez
- Michael Conan as Brando, Luisa's bodyguard

Guest cast

- Arlene Muhlach as Jenny "Jinggay", Budoy's former caretaker until she dies of a heart attack.
- Jayson Gainza as Kiko, former janitor and now a supervisor.
- Allan Paule as Carlos Santiago, Elena's husband
- Dale Baldillo as Young Budoy
- Giacobbe Whitworth as Young Budoy (5 years old)
- Andrea Brillantes as Young Jackie
- Omar Hassan as Young Benjamin
- Carmen Soo as Young Margaret
- Mikel Campos as Pilipinas IQ Staff
- Marvin Yap as JM
- Stella Cañete as Carla
- Paolo O'Hara as Jun
- Raymund Concepcion as Pilipinas IQ Host
- Fonz Deza as Jose Pelaez
- Perry Escaño as Julio
- Elaine Quemuel as Tess
- Miles Canapi as Anna
- Roeder as Jimmy
- Chris Raven De Guzman as Benjo Marasigan-Maniego, son of BJ and Jackie raised by his godparent Budoy when his parents died. He is also the grandson of Grace Maniego.

== Ratings ==
Budoy's pilot episode garnered an impressive rating of 27.2% nationwide behind perennial top-rater 100 Days to Heaven according to the October 10 data released by Kantar Media-TNS survey whereas it premiered with a rating of 19.4% in the GMA dominated area from a data by AGB Nielsen Mega Manila survey. Budoy has been neck-to-neck with GMA's Munting Heredera in GMA's stronghold of Mega Manila.

On the national ratings scale, the show's highest rating so far is a 32.4% national household rating (against its rival's 19.8%) on November 22, 2011, by Kantar Media/TNS.

On AGB Nielsen Mega Manila People & Household Ratings; the show's final episode, it garnered a 13.9% rating beating its rival show Legacy (GMA-7) who got 12.6%. Over-all the show became the second most watched show of the day behind Walang Hanggan.

== Criticism ==
The show has gained criticism and controversy in regards to the main character's depiction as a person with Angelman syndrome. Special education expert Yolanda Bautista and pediatrician Dr. Tippy Tanchanco, have observed some inconsistencies and factual inaccuracies in the protagonist, especially when he got out of a coma after suffering from an accident, as he was shown to be able to speak clearly, and at one point, become a genius. They also stressed that for the producers to brand the show as an "advocacy-serye", they shouldn't deviate from reality and refrain from adding any "cinematic effects", as it might give parents a misleading message. The most glaring example of gross factual inaccuracy is that almost no Angelman syndrome patients in the real world are capable of producing any significant speech. Some Angelman patients may have some success learning to communicate basic needs, feelings and thoughts through gesturing or body language, but meaningful verbal communication and even easy repetition of words is essentially an impossibility. The Budoy character bears virtually no resemblance to the appearance, behavior, abilities, and outcomes of actual Angelman patients.

The show also gained some stir among online communities as the portrayal of Gerald Anderson of Budoy is somewhat similar to Leonardo DiCaprio's character Arnie in the movie What's Eating Gilbert Grape with Johnny Depp.

== Awards and nominations ==
Year	Award	Category	Work	Result
2012	34th Catholic Mass Media Awards	Best Drama Series	Cast and crew	Won
2013	2013 New York Television and Film Festivals	Best Drama Series	Cast And Crew	Nominated

== See also ==
- List of programs broadcast by ABS-CBN
- List of ABS-CBN Studios original drama series
