= Dahil sa Pag-ibig (2012 TV series) =

- Title card
- Also known as: Confessions of the Heart
- Genre: Political drama; Romance; Christian drama
- Created by: ABS-CBN Studios
- Developed by: ABS-CBN Studios
- Written by: Raymund Diamzon; Marietta M. Lamasan; Siegfried B. Sanchez; Mariami Tanangco-Domingo
- Directed by: Darnel Joy R. Villaflor; Avel E. Sunpongco
- Starring: Piolo Pascual; Jericho Rosales; Cristine Reyes; Maricar Reyes; Christopher de Leon
- Opening theme: "Sa Kanya" by Piolo Pascual
- Composers: Ogie Alcasid, Ito Rapadas
- Country of origin: Philippines
- Original language: Filipino
- No. of episodes: 78

Production
- Executive producers: Roldeo T. Endrinal; Emerald C. Suarez
- Producers: Emerald C. Suarez; Julie Anne R. Benitez
- Production locations: Pililla, Rizal, Philippines; Metro Manila, Philippines; Rome, Italy
- Cinematography: Ronnie Jacinto; Rod Tinitigan
- Editor: Marion Bautista
- Running time: 30-45 minutes
- Production company: Dreamscape Entertainment Television

Original release
- Network: ABS-CBN
- Release: March 12 – June 29, 2012

Related
- May Bukas Pa; Agua Bendita; Momay; 100 Days to Heaven; Nathaniel; Huwag Kang Mangamba; Love in 40 Days

Dahil sa Pag-ibig (International title: Confessions of the Heart / transl. because of love) is a 2012 Philippine television drama series broadcast by ABS-CBN. Directed by Darnel Joy R. Villaflor and Avel E. Sunpongco, it stars Piolo Pascual, Jericho Rosales, Cristine Reyes, Maricar Reyes and Christopher de Leon. It aired on the network's Primetime Bida line up and worldwide on TFC from March 12 to June 29, 2012, replacing Budoy and was replaced by Lorenzo's Time.

== Overview ==
The TV series sets on the backdrop on a political family in a small town whose lives intercross when it comes to tying the bonds when it comes to love and family and the secrets beneath there political views and personal lives.

=== Production ===
The concept was visualized around September 2011. In a press conference held by ABS-CBN, they announced that an upcoming television drama, with a working title of Padre de Pamilya will be part of ABS-CBN's programs on the first quarter of 2012. They announced that the two leads will be Piolo Pascual and Jericho Rosales, and that Pascual's character is a priest. Other supporting actors that was revealed were Christopher de Leon, Maricar Reyes, Rafael Rosell, and Denise Laurel. This is Rafael’s last ABS CBN show before moving to GMA Network in that year. In November 2011, some scenes were filmed in Rome, Italy for Pascual's priest scenes in Vatican City. On January 25, 2012, ABS-CBN then launched the television series as Nang Dahil Sa Pag-Ibig with another actress added, Cristine Reyes. It is helmed by the directors of the critically acclaimed television drama, Minsan Lang Kita Iibigin, Darnel Villaflor and Avel Sunpongco.

=== Promotion ===
A special teaser for the trailer was released on February 22, 2012 stating that the series is now titled Dahil sa Pag-Ibig. The full trailer was released on February 27, 2012 during the ABS-CBN television drama, Budoy. The series' premiered on March 12, 2012.

This show has been developed by Mga Anghel na Walang Langit, Princess Sarah, May Bukas Pa, Agua Bendita, Momay, Noah, Mutya, 100 Days to Heaven, Budoy, and Ikaw ay Pag-Ibig due to genre of family and religious-oriented drama series where Dreamscape Entertainment released these types of series since 2005. It was succeeded by Lorenzo's Time.

== Cast and characters ==
Main cast

- Piolo Pascual as Fr. Alfred Valderama / Benjamin Osorio Jr.
- Jericho Rosales as Oliver Falcon / Jepoy Osorio
- Maricar Reyes as Agnes Javier
- Cristine Reyes as Jasmin Valderama
- Christopher de Leon as Gov. Leo Valderama

Supporting cast

- Rafael Rosell as Edson Saguirre
- Denise Laurel as Wendy Garcia
- Rey "PJ" Abellana as Marlon Rivero
- Tetchie Agbayani as Belinda Rivero
- Freddie Webb as Daniel Falcon
- Carla Martinez as Helen Falcon
- Joonee Gamboa as Fr. Benedict Cruz
- Cheska Iñigo as Marina Saguirre
- Malou Crisologo as Yaya Ceding
- Kristel Fulgar as Andrea Rivero
- Lorenzo Mara as Dennis Velasco
- Edward Mendez as Theo

Guest cast

- Lui Villaruz as Mike Barrios
- Johnny Revilla as Mr. Javier
- Maritess Joaquin as Mrs. Javier
- Mark Sarayot as Janus
- Nanding Josef as Nonoy
- Idda Yaneza as Lita Magpantay

Special participation

- Ronaldo Valdez as Don Ramon Velasco
- Sandy Andolong as Cindy Velasco-Valderama
- Joel Torre as Benjamin Osorio
- Melissa Mendez as Elena Osorio
- Bing Davao as Rodolfo Saguirre
- Francis Magundayao as Teen Alfred Valderama
- Ella Cruz as Teen Jasmin Valderama
- Carlo Lacana as Teen Edson Saguirre
- Annica Tindoy as kid Jasmin Valderama
- Nathaniel Britt as kid Alfred Valderama
- Yong An Chiu as Young Mike Barrios
- Quintin Alianza as Kid Edson

== Soundtrack ==
Dahil Sa Pag-ibig: The Official Soundtrack

Soundtrack album by Various artists
- Released: January 15, 2012
- Recorded: 2011–2012
- Genres: OPM, pop
- Label: Star Music
- Producer: ABS-CBN Film Productions, Inc.

=== Track listing ===
No.	Title	Writer(s)	Artist	Length
1.	"Sa Kanya"	Ogie Alcasid	Piolo Pascual	4:48
2.	"Maghihintay Sa'yo"	Dingdong Avanzado	Angeline Quinto	4:41
3.	"Pagdating ng Panahon"	Moy Ortiz & Edith M. Gallardo	Bryan Termulo	5:33
4.	"Nang Dahil Sa Pag-ibig"	Tootsie Guevara	Cristine Reyes	4:21

== Awards and nominations ==
Year	Award	Category	Result
2012	34th Catholic Mass Media Awards	Best Drama Series	Won
2012	26th PMPC Star Awards for TV	Best Drama Series (shared with the cast)	Nominated
2012	26th PMPC Star Awards for TV	Best Drama Actor (Jericho Rosales)	Won
2012	26th PMPC Star Awards for TV	Best Drama Actor (Piolo Pascual)	Nominated
2013	4th Golden Screen TV Awards	Outstanding Performance by an Actor in a Drama Series (Jericho Rosales)	Nominated
2013	4th Golden Screen TV Awards	Outstanding Performance by an Actor in a Drama Series (Piolo Pascual)	Nominated

== See also ==
- List of programs broadcast by ABS-CBN
- List of ABS-CBN Studios original drama series
