= Mario Balotelli (song) =

Single by Ruff Sqwad

from the album 2012
- Released: 24 January 2012
- Genre: Grime, hip hop
- Length: 4:25
- Label: Takeover Entertainment
- Songwriter(s): Kwasi Danquah III, Slix Fleeingham, David Nkrumah, Prince Rapid
- Producer(s): Prince Rapid

Ruff Sqwad singles chronology
"Las Vegas" (2011)	"Mario Balotelli" (2012)

Music video
- "Mario Balotelli" on YouTube

"Mario Balotelli" is a song by grime crew Ruff Sqwad. The song is taken from their EP 2012. It was released on 24 January 2012 as a digital download.

== Background ==
The song came into fruition when Slix had the idea of using Mario Balotelli's iconic phrase "Why Always Me?" as a chorus in a song to make a "Mario Balotelli anthem".

== Music video ==
The official music video was filmed on 15 January 2012 and was uploaded to YouTube on 17 January 2012 at a total length of four minutes and twenty-five seconds.

== Track listing ==
Digital Single

No.	Title	Writer(s)	Producer(s)	Length
1.	"Mario Balotelli"	Kwasi Danquah III, Slix Fleeingham, David Nkrumah, Prince Rapid	Prince Rapid	4:25

== Credits and personnel ==
Personnel

- Producers – Prince Rapid
- Lyrics – Kwasi Danquah III, Slix Fleeingham, David Nkrumah, Prince Rapid
- Composer – David Nkrumah
- Label: Takeover Entertainment Limited

== Release history ==
Date	Format	Label
24 January 2012	Digital Download	Takeover Entertainment Limited
