= Take Me Back (Tinchy Stryder song) =

2009 single by Tinchy Stryder

Single by Tinchy Stryder featuring Taio Cruz

from the album Catch 22
- B-side: "Rollin'"
- Released: 19 January 2009
- Recorded: 2008
- Genre: Electronic; dance-pop; R&B
- Length: 3:32 (Catch 22 version); 3:12 (Rokstarr version / Radio edit); 3:27 (The Rokstarr Collection version); 4:14 (remix)
- Label: Takeover; Island
- Songwriter(s): Kwasi Danquah III; Taio Cruz; Fraser T Smith
- Producer(s): Fraser T Smith

Tinchy Stryder singles chronology
"Where's Your Love" (2008)	"Take Me Back" (2009)	"Number 1" (2009)

Taio Cruz singles chronology
"She's like a Star" (2008)	"Take Me Back" (2009)	"Break Your Heart" (2009)

Music video
- "Take Me Back" on YouTube

"Take Me Back" is a song by British rapper Tinchy Stryder, featuring vocals from Taio Cruz, it was produced by Fraser T Smith. The song features on Stryder's album Catch 22 and was released as the album's second single on 19 January 2009. The music video features both Tinchy Stryder and Taio Cruz in various black and white backgrounds as well as in front of cars, large dogs and women dancing in swim costumes.

== Background ==
Five alternative versions of the song exist. The first, main version of the single, which is the version promoted as a single, credits Stryder as the main artist and vocalist, with the hook and chorus by Cruz. This version features on the single, Stryder's second studio album, Catch 22 and the British version of Cruz' second studio album, Rokstarr. The second version of the song features additional rap verses from rappers Sway and Chipmunk. This version features as a B-side to the single and on the deluxe edition of Catch 22. The third version of the song credits Cruz as the main artist and vocalist, with several all-new verses, and features only a short rap by Stryder at the start of the track. This version can be found on Cruz' compilation album, The Rokstarr Collection. The fourth version of the song features Cruz entirely on his own, with no vocals from Stryder at all. His version can be found on the American, European and Brazilian editions of Rokstarr. The fifth version of the song also completely removes Stryder, features Cruz as the main artist and vocalist, and also features guest vocals from Jamaican singer Tami Chynn. This version can be found on the Jamaican edition of Rokstarr.

== Track listing ==
CD single
No.	Title	Length
1.	"Take Me Back" (Radio Edit)	3:32
2.	"Take Me Back" (Remix) (featuring Sway and Chipmunk)	5:26
3.	"Take Me Back" (Sunship Remix)	3:19
4.	"Rollin'"	2:54

Digital download
No.	Title	Length
1.	"Take Me Back" (Sunship Remix)	3:19
2.	"Take Me Back" (Vito Benito Remix)	3:45

== Charts ==
=== Weekly charts ===
Weekly chart performance for "Take Me Back"
Chart (2009)	Peak position
Belgium (Ultratip Bubbling Under Flanders)	11
Finland (Suomen virallinen lista)	16
Ireland (IRMA)	16
UK Singles (OCC)	3

=== Year-end charts ===
Year-end chart performance for "Take Me Back"
Chart (2009)	Position
UK Singles Chart	54

== Certifications ==
Certifications for "Take Me Back"
Region	Certification	Certified units/sales
United Kingdom (BPI)	Silver	200,000^{^}
^{^} Shipments figures based on certification alone.
