= Pixmania =

French e-commerce website

Pixmania S.A.S
- Type: Joint-stock company
- Industry: Electronic commerce
- Founded: 2000; 26 years ago
- Headquarters: Paris, France
- Key people: Steve Rosenblum Jean-Emile Rosenblum Ulric Jerome Pingki Houang Sacha Doliner Group Managing Directors
- Products: Digital photography, Telecommunications, Information technology, Brown goods, White goods
- Revenue: €900 million (2012)
- Number of employees: 880 (2013)
- Parent: Mutares AG
- Website: www.pixmania.com

Pixmania (styled PIXmania), once known as Fotovista, was a French-based e-commerce website, founded in 2000. It promoted a variety of products, including consumer electronics and baby products, with turnover of over €300million in 2013. It operated a website and until 2013 ran brick-and-mortar retail stores in Europe. It was active in 14 European countries.

Pixmania was majority owned (77%) by the British Dixons Retail plc (formerly DSG International plc) from 2006, selling it on to German-based holding company Mutares in 2013.

== History ==
The Pixmania group has its roots in the Rosenblum family business (particularly the brothers Pierre and Jean-Claude); Les Laboratoires parisiens. Originally the group consisted of school photography Studio National, and a media distribution service, Press Labo Service.

In 2001 the torch was handed over to Steve and Jean-Emile Rosenblum (Jean-Claude's sons) with the help of investment funds supplied mainly by the LMBO group, a French venture capital firm. They purchased the LLP Group. Pixmania became an online retailer selling camera and photography equipment. As the business expanded the company was renamed Fotovista and then Pixmania Group in 2009. Pixmania sales grew from €70million in 2001 to €898million in 2011-2012 when Steve and Jean-Emile Rosenblum sold their remaining 20% shares in the company. In 2006, Steve and Jean-Emile Rosenblum sold a significant part of their shares to DSG International PLC.

On 12 April 2006, DSG International plc gained a 75% interest by acquiring LMBO Group's controlling stake in the company and shares from the Rosenblum family and a handful of managers, for €266 million (approximately £185 million). Under the deal agreed DSGi has an option to buy out the remaining 25 per cent from the family and management over the following three to five years. The acquisition was subject to approval by the European Union Competition Authority. After receiving approval the company completed the acquisition of 77% of the Fotovista Group for €261 million (approximately £184 million). In 2009, the group reverted to its former name, Pixmania.

In September 2013, Dixons Retail, the parent company of PC World and Currys, made a strategic move by selling off the underperforming Pixmania to the German company Mutares AG for €69 million. Pixmania had incurred significant losses of £31 million during the financial year ending on 30 April 2013, and had been adversely affecting its parent company's financial performance, despite Dixons Retail's efforts to reorganize the business.

Fast forward to 2021, and Pixmania resumed its business operations in France.

As of February 2024, the Pixmania group is actively conducting business in the French and Spanish markets, with its offices situated in Île-de-France. The company is in a phase of rapid expansion and is actively recruiting new personnel to support its growth.
