= Guns and Roses (TV series) =

- Title card
- Genre: Action; Drama; Romance; Slice of Life; Suspense; Thriller
- Created by: ABS-CBN Studios
- Written by: Genesis Rodriguez; Jerome T. Co
- Directed by: Trina N. Dayrit; Rechie A. del Carmen
- Starring: Robin Padilla; Bea Alonzo; Diether Ocampo; Empress; Ejay Falcon
- Opening theme: "Dahil Mahal Kita" by Jovit Baldivino / Bea Alonzo and Robin Padilla
- Composer: Manuel Mallillin
- Country of origin: Philippines
- Original language: Filipino
- No. of episodes: 80 (list of episodes)

Production
- Executive producers: Carlo Katigbak; Cory Vidanes; Laurenti Dyogi; Malou Santos
- Producers: Narciso Y. Gulmatico, Jr.; Maricris P. Sioson
- Production location: Metro Manila
- Running time: 30-45 minutes
- Production company: Star Creatives

Original release
- Network: ABS-CBN
- Release: June 6 – September 23, 2011

Guns and Roses is a 2011 Philippine television drama action series broadcast by ABS-CBN. Directed by Trina N. Dayrit and Rechie A. del Carmen, it stars Robin Padilla, Bea Alonzo and Diether Ocampo. It aired on the network's Primetime Bida line up and worldwide on TFC from June 6 to September 23, 2011, replacing Mara Clara and was replaced by Budoy.

This is Robin Padilla's second action primetime series in the network, following the television series Basta't Kasama Kita, which concluded eight years ago. This is the first team up with Bea Alonzo as his leading lady and Diether Ocampo in a TV Production. The TV series concluded with a total of 80 episodes.

== Episodes ==
Year	Episode numbers	Episodes	First aired	Last aired
2011	1–80	80	June 6, 2011	September 23, 2011

== Cast and characters ==
=== Main cast ===
- Robin Padilla as Abelardo "Abel" Marasigan. Abel suffers a traumatic childhood when he witnesses his father being framed up by his fellow police officers, leading to his father's mental break down. He vows revenge and he becomes a vigilante who fights for the rights of the hopeless. He wants to try to be part of Don Lucio's endeavors.
- Bea Alonzo as Regina "Reign" Santana. An artist, receives a big blow in her life when her fiancé dies on the day of their wedding after helping out some victims of a hold-up outside the church. From then on she has become a cold, empty shell longing for the love she lost to a violent and unfortunate circumstance.
- Diether Ocampo as Marcus Aguilar. He is the policeman in charge of investigating the death of Reign's fiancé. As he gets closer to solving the case, he also could not help but fall for Reign's beauty and charm. In the finale, it was revealed that he was responsible for killing Reign's fiancé due to his obsession with her.
- Ejay Falcon as Jonathan "Onat" Marasigan. Youngest brother of Abel. He longs for a father figure in his life after their father was admitted to a mental institution. He finds solace is his brother but becomes very disappointed in him when he suddenly leaves their family.
- Empress Schuck as Joanne "Joni" Dela Rocha. A sweet girl who will melt Onat's hardened heart. She believes in happy ever afters and the innate goodness of every person. She is bubbly and charming but can be a bit stubborn at times.

=== Supporting cast ===
- Gladys Reyes as Diana Montano Alvaro
- Pinky Amador as Aretha Aguilar
- Liza Lorena as Dolor Marasigan/Delta
- Mark Gil as Don Lucio Dela Rocha/Señor
- Maliksi Morales as Prince Santana
- Nanding Josef as Jose "Pepe" Marasigan
- Isabel Rivas as Patricia "Patria" Santana
- Ketchup Eusebio as MacArthur "Mac-Mac" Pangan
- Pen Medina as Philip "Tsong" Marasigan
- Justin Cuyugan as King Santana
- Minnie Aguilar as Yayey
- Boom Labrusca as Franco Moreno
- Ina Feleo as Diana "Dindin" Ventura
- Ian Galliguez as Axl Navarro

=== Guest cast ===
- Froilan Sales as Zabala
- Bernard Laxa as Paltik
- Lauren Novero as Russell
- Roy Alvarez as Arnulfo
- Hiyasmin Neri as Kitchie
- Allan Paule as Dante
- Crispin Pineda as Badong
- Janus del Prado as Vincent Bartolome
- Archie Adamos as Ybanez Ramirez
- Levi Ignacio as Melvin Buendia/Marvin Intalan
- Lito Pimentel as Rico Bartolome
- Angel Jacob as Cristina Dela Rocha
- Chinggoy Alonzo as Don Soliven
- Joonee Gamboa as Father Fabian

=== Special participation ===
- John Wayne Sace as Teen Abel
- Jairus Aquino as Young Abel
- Mika dela Cruz as Young Reign
- Nash Aguas as Teen Marcus
- Phytos Ramirez as Young King
- William Lorenzo as Young Pepe
- Gilleth Sandico as Young Dolor
- Farrah Florer as Young Patria
- Paolo Rivero as Young Philip
- Neri Naig as Young Marlen
- Manuel Chua as Young Marvin
- Jose Sarasola as Young Rico
- Simon Ibarra as Young Badong
- Tom Rodriguez as Young Lucio
- Jake Cuenca as Paolo Ventura - Reign's fiancé and a brother of Dindin who was killed by Marcus before starting his wedding
- Mark Sarayot as Teen Jonathan Onat Marasigan

== Remake ==
Hindi television serial Rangrasiya was inspired from Guns and Roses which debuted on Indian channel Colours on December 30, 2013.

== Theme song ==
The theme song entitled Dahil Mahal Kita was originally performed by The Boyfriends and also covered by Ogie Alcasid.

== See also ==
- List of programs broadcast by ABS-CBN
- List of ABS-CBN Studios original drama series
