= Maniac (producer) =

British grime producer

- Born: Brandon James Theophilus Jolie; Bow, East London, England
- Genres: Grime; British hip hop Rap; UK drill
- Occupation: Producer
- Years active: 2006–2009; 2015–present

Brandon James Theophilus Jolie, known professionally as Maniac, is a British grime producer. Maniac has produced for various artists such as Wiley, Tinchy Stryder, and Chip.

== Career ==
=== 2006–09 ===
Maniac first came to prominence at the age of 16 when his track "Bow E3" was used by Wiley for his album Playtime Is Over. In 2008 Maniac released a collaborative album with Tinchy Stryder entitled Tinchy Stryder vs. Maniac. This was followed by his first solo CD New Age Grime in 2009. Maniac contributed a number of tracks to the 2008 film Adulthood, recorded a single for a Nike advertising campaign and had his music featured on British soap EastEnders.

In 2009, Maniac was convicted of conspiracy to murder and sentenced to 14 years. He had attempted to murder a 15 year-old girl following news that he had impregnated her. He was later given a conditional early release in 2015.

=== 2009–15 ===
Maniac had recorded prolifically and had a large unreleased back catalogue. Tracks from this back catalogue have continued to be released, including the track "Man Dem" which featured on Chipmunk's 2010 platinum selling album I Am Chipmunk and "Liquid Organ" which was used by Wiley on his 2014 album Snakes & Ladders.

=== 2015–present ===
In 2015, Maniac was released from prison on a conditional licence and returned to making music. His first music release was a single with Wiley entitled "Outchea". In October 2015, Maxsta announced that he would be releasing a collaborative EP with Maniac on Rinse. Maniac produced four tracks for the BrOTHERHOOD film soundtrack, collaborating with Chip, AJ Tracey, P Money and Curtis Clacey.

== Discography ==
Albums

- Tinchy Stryder vs. Maniac (Eskibeat Recordings, 2008) (with Tinchy Stryder)
- Adulthood (Altered Ego Music, 2008)
- New Age Grime (Ghetto Platinum Productions, 2009)
- BrOTHERHOOD (Black Butter, 2016)

Singles & EPs

- Devil EP (Adamantium Music, 2008)
- Salt Fish EP (Earth616, 2009)
- Thug / Wreckage (Terrorhythm, 2010)
- Devil Vs Saltfish EP (Pitch Controllers, 2011)
- 100 Problems (Rinse Recordings, 2015) (with Maxsta and Boothroyd)
- Homecoming EP (Earth616, 2017)
- R.A. Real artillery Various singles 2018
- Ard Adz - Whats Gwarning (feat. Bellzey)
- Ard Adz various singles 2018
- AJ Tracey - Fighting
- Chip - New Day
- Eyez - Smoking Fine
- Headie One - This Week (feat. Yxng Bane)
- JME - Shh Hut Yuh Muh
- Laura Mvula - Ready or Not (feat. Berna)[Maniac Remix]
- P Money - Stone Island Ting (feat. Little Dee, Safone and Capo Lee)
- Wiley - Grew Up In (feat. Stormzy & Solo 45)
- Wiley - 38 Challenge
- Wretch 32 - Ina Di Ghetto (feat. Badness & Ghetts)
