= Tinchy Stryder =

English rapper (born 1986)

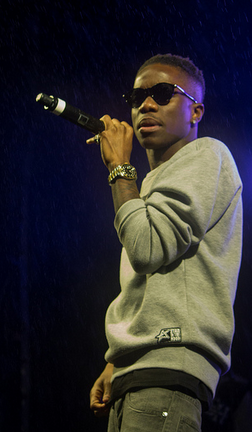
- Stryder performing in 2013
- Born: Kwasi Esono Danquah III; 14 September 1986 (age 40); Accra, Ghana
- Other names: Tinchy Stryder; The Star in the Hood
- Education: University of East London
- Occupations: Rapper; singer; songwriter; entrepreneur; investor
- Years active: 1997–present
- Title: Chairman and CEO of S.I.T.H (2009–present); President and CEO of Takeover/Cloud 9 (2009–present); Chairman of Takeover Entertainment (2010–2013); CEO and SEVP of Takeover Roc Nation (2010–present); CEO and Creative director of Goji Electronics (2012–present)
- Partner: Amba Miller (engaged)
- Children: 2
- Musical career
- Genres: UK rap; grime; R&B
- Labels: Takeover (2007–12); Island (2008–12); Cloud 9 (2014–present)
- Website: tinchystryder.com

Kwasi Esono Danquah III (/ˈkweɪsi dæŋˈkwɑː/ KWAY-see dang-KWAH; born 14 September 1986), better known by his stage name Tinchy Stryder, is a Ghanaian rapper, singer, songwriter, entrepreneur and investor.

Stryder has released three solo studio albums, Star in the Hood (2007), Catch 22 (2009), and Third Strike (2010). Stryder's business ventures include the clothing line Star in the Hood, the Cloud 9 X Goji headphone and audio equipment range in collaboration with Goji Electronics.

== Early life and education ==
Stryder was born as Kwasi Esono Danquah III on 14 September 1986 in Accra, Ghana.

Stryder has lived in the United Kingdom since 1995. In Bow, London, he attended St Bonaventure's Catholic School in nearby Forest Gate, Newham; He gained a B.A. (Hons) in Digital arts, Moving image and Animation at the University of East London. He began making music in 1997, aged 11, and started in business almost immediately after completing his A-levels in 2006.

== Music career ==
Stryder's recordings date back to 1998. He appeared in 2000 on pirate radio along with Dizzee Rascal and Wiley, and was part of grime collective and record production team Ruff Sqwad from 2001. His pseudonym Tinchy Stryder derives from the video game Strider and from the nickname given to him, "Tinchy", which literally means "tiny". He has stated that his height is 5 ft 5 in.

In 2002, the grime group Roll Deep was founded by Wiley, and included Stryder and Dizzee Rascal. They were making music that was a derivative of garage. For a while, there was not even a name for it. The name "grime" was the one that stuck. While performing with Roll Deep, Stryder performed some songs including "U Were Always" in 2002, which was released years later on Roll Deep's compilation album Street Anthems in 2009. He also performed on Roll Deep's 2004 mixtape, Creeper Vol. 2.

=== 2006–08: Star in the Hood ===
The debut album by Stryder, Star in the Hood, was released on 13 August 2007 on Takeover. The album spawned two main singles, "Breakaway", which was released on 9 April 2007 and "Something About Your Smile", was released on 6 August 2007. Bonus track "Mainstream Money" was also released as an underground single in November 2007.

In 2008, Stryder released his debut extended play, Cloud 9 The EP, which was released on 31 March, also on Takeover. This was succeeded by him and grime record producer Maniac collaborating on the album, Tinchy Stryder vs. Maniac, which was released on 24 November 2008. Only one single was released from the album, "Rollin", which was released in October 2008. This track was also included on his 2009 second solo studio album, Catch 22, as part of the, Deluxe 2-Disc Edition, and he would collaborate with American band Gang Gang Dance on their album Saint Dymphna that was released in October 2008.

=== 2008–2010: Catch 22 ===
Stryder began a partnership with English record producer and songwriter Fraser T Smith. According to Smith in an interview with HitQuarters, "Kwasi had no shortage of beats and cool sounding production, but I think he wanted to try and break through into the mainstream, and I had some experience crossing underground over into mainstream having worked with artists like Craig David."

The single "Stryderman", was released on 20 July 2008. It was the first single taken from Catch 22. The second single, "Take Me Back", was released on 19 January 2009. His third single, a collaboration with the English hip-hop band N-Dubz entitled "Number 1," peaked at number 6 on the European Hot 100 Singles and number 1 in the UK & Ireland and became the first single with the title "Number 1" to peak at #1 in any country. His fourth single from Catch 22, "Never Leave You", was released on 3 August 2009 with the album following on 17 August 2009. "Never Leave You" peaked at number 5 on the European Hot 100 Singles on the week of its release. Catch 22 debuted at number 11 on the European Top 100 Albums. The fifth and final single from Catch 22 is "You're Not Alone," which was released in November 2009 and samples the Olive song of the same name.

In February 2010, Stryder headline toured for the third time, he invited the English singer Example and rapper JME as his supporting acts. The tour was Stryder's second sell-out tour after he toured in 2009 and helped in raising the profile of Example. Stryder opened on the pyramid stage at the England Glastonbury Festival, on Saturday, 27 June 2010. He also performed at the O2 Arena in England, for the Transformation Trust's first birthday alongside The Saturdays.

=== 2010–11: Third Strike ===
Stryder's third solo studio album, Third Strike was released on Monday, 15 November 2010 and was an unsuccessful album. Stryder began recording Third Strike shortly after he completed his previous album; he then released a promotional single, "Gangsta?", six months prior to the release of the studio album. This was followed by the release of the first official single, a year from the day he released his second studio album. He began working with Fraser T Smith who had also worked on his second studio album. English singer Taio Cruz produced the largely, along with Fraser T Smith. The album title was picked by the title of Street Fighter III 3rd Strike which was also a massive success. Third Strike features several artists, including English singer Amelle, with whom he collaborated on Catch 22 on the single "Never Leave You".

The album features Taio Cruz who also featured on the Stryder's last album. The album also features artists affiliated with Roc Nation: Canadian singer Melanie Fiona on "Let It Rain", American singer Alexis Jordan, and American singer Bridget Kelly on "Take The World". The song "Game Over" features six different artists. Eric Turner from the Swedish rock band Street Fighting Man also features on the album.

=== 2011–14: Non-album singles ===
The first single from the scrapped studio album entitled Full Tank is "Spaceship" and it features English singer and songwriter Dappy from N-Dubz. Stryder performed at the 2011 UEFA Champions League Final in support of the single, making him the first rapper in history to perform at a UEFA Champions League final.

He teamed up with Scottish DJs and record producers Calvin Harris and Matt Burns, credited as 'BURNS', for the second single from the scrapped album, "Off the Record". On 3 November 2011 Stryder announced in an interview that his fourth album would be entitled; "Full Tank".

On 3 January 2012 Stryder released the video for the third single from Full Tank entitled "Bright Lights" which features English singer Pixie Lott. There is also another version of the song entitled 'Bright Lights Part II' that is featured on Pixie Lott's second studio album, Young Foolish Happy. In various media outlets in July 2012, Stryder spoke of the single "Help Me" being released in September 2012. The video of the single was released on 15 August 2012, featuring singer and songwriter Camille Purcell. It has been described as "unmistakably Tinchy" and "among his better work".

On 25 December 2012, on his Facebook page, Stryder released a freestyle titled "Look at Me Now" along with it he said "Look out for the first single from my fourth album early next year. Can't wait to share this new music with you all!". This being said means "Spaceship", "Off the Record", "Bright Lights" and "Help Me" became non-album singles.

=== 2014–present: The Cloud 9 LP / 360° ===
Four years after his last album, Stryder released a promotional single, "Misunderstood", on 14 April 2014. It was slated to feature on his forthcoming fourth album, but didn't make the final cut.

"ESG", the album's lead single, was released on 9 June 2014. It features vocals from Takura and production by Show N Prove. Along with the release of the single, Tinchy announced that the new album would be titled 360°.

In October 2014, Stryder paired up with the Chuckle Brothers to release a charity single "To Me, To You (Bruv)" to raise money for the African-Caribbean Leukaemia Trust.

Stryder participated in the fourteenth series of I'm a Celebrity...Get Me Out of Here!, having been chosen by the public to complete one trial. He left on day 21.

On 26 April 2015, Tinchy released a new non-album single, "Imperfection", featuring vocals from Fuse ODG. Despite being playlisted by numerous UK radio stations, the song failed to enter the UK Singles Chart.

On 8 May and 16 May 2015 respectively, Tinchy released "Six Four Stuff" and "Blurt" (featuring K2 World) for free download via SoundCloud. With the two grime singles, he announced that the new album was to be titled The Cloud 9 LP. On 23 August 2015, Tinchy released a video for a new song, "Sekky", which features vocals from fellow Ruff Sqwad member Roachee and production from Sir Spyro and Rude Kid. This was the second song from the album to be premiered.

On 3 March 2016, Tinchy announced that The Cloud 9 LP / 360° will be released as a fourteen-track double album on 8 April 2016. This announcement was accompanied by the release of "Allow Me" (featuring Jme) as an "instant grat" single; those who pre-order the new album can instantly download the new single.

== Business ventures and endorsements ==
In September 2006, Stryder created the clothing brand Star in the Hood, named after his pseudonym "Star in the Hood". In June 2010, he aligned Takeover Entertainment Limited, with entertainment powerhouses Roc Nation LLC and Live Nation, and created Takeover Roc Nation. The joint venture ended in 2013 but he remains close to Roc Nation.

In December 2008, Stryder created his own global publishing company, Takeover/Cloud 9 by a joint venture with EMI division EMI Music Publishing.

On 8 November 2011, Honda's motorbike division hired Stryder for their pan-European campaign. The campaign featuring Stryder was supported by Facebook, Inc., and a tie-up with fashion brand GAS in order to push the Vision 50, Honda's 50cc entry level scooter. The Vision 50 was launched on 8 November 2011 at the EICMA (Milan Motorcycle Show) in Milan, Italy along with six other bike models.

In June 2012, Danquah released a line of consumer electronics. The Goji Electronics line consists of the brand of headphones, Goji Tinchy Stryder, the Goji On Cloud 9 Audio equipment, a circumaural headphone, an on-ear headphone, an in-ear headphone, a series of HD over-ear headphones, a supra-aural headphone, travel speakers, also consumer electronics such as tablet computer, netbook and smartphone accessories. The headphones are distributed by DSG International plc. DSG International and Danquah announced the deal in June 2012. The Goji Electronics consumer electronics and audio equipment, known as Goji Tinchy Stryder and Goji On Cloud 9, were available for sale mid-July 2012 and are distributed by DSG International plc subsidiaries across Europe and Pixmania globally.

== Personal life ==
Stryder revealed in January 2010 that he wanted to become a footballer as a youth. Stryder was a left-footed player who could play as a striker or second striker, and was enrolled at the academy of Wimbledon F.C. from 2000 to 2003 and the youth team of Leyton Orient F.C. from 2003 to 2006. Stryder has a daughter, Arabella, with fiancée Amba Miller. In May 2021, they had a son.

=== Charity work ===
On 4 November 2010 Stryder attended the O2 Shepherd's Bush Empire in England, for Alicia Keys' charity Keep a Child Alive charity ball and auction, along with other special guests. All proceeds from the auctions for the event were donated to Keep a Child Alive (KCA). Stryder donates income from Goji Electronics to charity.

== Discography ==
Studio albums

- Star in the Hood (2007)
- Catch 22 (2009)
- Third Strike (2010)
- 360º / The Cloud 9 LP (2016)

== See also ==
- Tinchy Stryder videography
- List of awards and nominations received by Kwasi Danquah III
- Tinchy Stryder discography
- List of Tinchy Stryder songs
- List of artists who reached number one on the UK Singles Chart
