= Ruff Sqwad =

British grime crew

- Origin: East London, England
- Genres: Grime
- Instruments: Digital audio workstation; sampler; turntables; keyboards; synthesizer; drum machine
- Years active: 2001–2013; 2015–present
- Labels: Takeover Entertainment Limited; Ruff Sqwad Recordings
- Members: Prince Rapid; Fuda Guy; Roachee; Slix; Dirty Danger
- Past members: Tinchy Stryder; Mad Max; Shifty Rydos; DJ Scholar; DJ Begg; XTC; Sir Spyro; Mercy

Ruff Sqwad are an English grime crew. The group was formed in 2001 in Bow, East London. Various members and affiliates of the crew are considered key figures in the early development of grime music.

Ruff Sqwad first became known in the early days of grime for the distinctive production style of the crew's producers. Early Ruff Sqwad instrumentals were released on white label, which are currently rare and fetch high prices on the second hand market. Notable early Ruff Sqwad instrumentals include Pied Piper, Functions on the Low and Misty Cold. Functions on the Low, produced by Ruff Sqwad affiliate XTC has been described as one of the greatest tracks in the history of British electronic music. The crew has released two mixtapes, Guns and Roses Volume. 1 and Guns and Roses Volume. 2, an extended play (2012) as well as an instrumental compilation album, White Label Classics.

== History ==
=== Origins: 2001–2005 ===
Ruff Sqwad was formed by Slix, Shifty Rydos and Prince Rapid in 2001, emerging out of a wider friendship group of around thirty teenagers with musical aspirations who frequented various East London youth clubs. Their earliest material included home recordings ripped direct to cassette tape before they were featured on pirate radio. Many of the group's best known instrumentals were made by Rapid and Dirty Danger on cheap home PCs as 14- and 15-year-olds, including their debut single "Tings in Boots". The group would regularly bunk school to record songs and to press up vinyl at Music House. The crew was active on the London pirate radio scene and at various times during the early 2000s had shows on Rinse FM, Heat, Flava, Mystic, and Deja Vu FM. During this period the group regularly released singles on white label vinyl on an imprint called Ruff Sqwad Recordings following a template laid out by Wiley's Wiley Kat Recordings.

"Grime from the "golden days" of 2003–5 is very close to my heart. Even within this ultra-niche, ultra-creative genre full of variety, few crews had the unique magic of Ruff Sqwad. It was something about the colour and dizzying emotion in their melodies, the raw DIY aesthetic of their productions – many made on computes in their college music lab – the unusual penchant for '80s stadium rock drum fills and guitar synths… The MCs had their individual styles dripping with charisma but as a team could sound so honed."

— Bok Bok

=== Mixtape releases: 2005–2006 ===
In 2005, Ruff Sqwad's first mixtape, Guns and Roses Volume. 1, was released. It was released in March 2005 on the independent record label Ruff Sqwad Recordings, and was very well received by the grime scene. It has been ranked amongst the best full-length studio albums of all time to come from the grime scene. The album was the first of a three-part album series.

Ruff Sqwad's second mixtape, Guns and Roses Volume. 2, was released in October 2006. It was released on the independent record label Ruff Sqwad Recordings, and was very well received by the grime scene. Along with their debut album, Guns and Roses Volume. 1, it has also been ranked amongst the best full-length studio albums of all time to come from the grime scene. During this period Ruff Sqwad performed regularly at live events including the very first Dirty Canvas night put on by NoHatsNoHoods.

=== Decline, breakup and new roster ===
Following the solo success of Tinchy Stryder and other crew members Ruff Sqwad became less active as a group. In 2011 the crew recorded a single called Mario Balotelli. In 2012 Rapid and Dirty Danger collaborated with NoHatsNoHoods to recover recordings previously thought to be lost of some of the group's early instrumentals which led to the release of a compilation album called White Label Classics. The group has been on hiatus since releasing Cold in 2013. In May 2015, Tinchy Stryder confirmed that Ruff Sqwad had split up, citing reasons such as internal conflicts and Slix not making music anymore. In December 2015, a music video for the new song That's Who We Are was released, starring original member Prince Rapid, previous member Fuda Guy and previously affiliated Roachee, all of them seemingly part of Ruff Sqwad.

Though Ruff Sqwad was not musically active as a group for the most part of 2015, the year showed a resurgence in other grime MC's utilising instrumental productions stemming from former and current members from Ruff Sqwad, such as the song Stormzy – Shut Up which used XTC's Functions on the Low instrumental.

In October 2023, music magazine TRENCH hosted a free event at the Adidas Flagship Store on Oxford Street headlined by Ruff Sqwad. Many of the crew's original members including Tinchy Stryder, Dirty Danger, Prince Rapid, Slix and Fuda Guy were involved in the performance, which was quoted as their first in six years. In March 2024, Rapid, Slix (credited as Slix Fleeingham) and Dirty Danger (credited as David Is A King) released a collaborative EP as Ruff Sqwad titled Flee FM, inspired by pirate radio sets.

== Members ==
Ruff Sqwad currently has three members: Prince Rapid, Fuda Guy and Roachee.

Ruff Sqwad logo from 2006 – 2010

=== Tinchy Stryder ===
Tinchy Stryder (Real name: Kwasi Danquah III, born 14 September 1986), has been a member of the Ruff Sqwad since 2001. He is the best known member of the group having had much mainstream success with his solo material. Stryder has been prominent in the grime scene since the early 2000s and was a member of Roll Deep crew for a short period of time early in his career. His solo discography includes three albums and two UK number 1 singles.

=== Roachee ===
Former Roll Deep member Roachee replaced Slix and appeared in the music video for 'That's How We Are' by Ruff Sqwad.

=== Dirty Danger ===
Dirty Danger (David Nkrumah, born 1984 and formerly known as Dirty Dangerous) is a grime MC and producer and founding member of Ruff Sqwad. Dirty Danger is one of the more active producers in the crew and his best known track is Misty Cold. He produced various tracks for Tinchy Stryder's debut album "Star in the Hood", as well as Ruff Sqwad's two Guns and Roses Mixtapes. He has been involved with the Ruff Sqwad movement from the outset and is a well-known artist within the grime scene. He has released two solo mixtapes I Ain't Rich Yet and Danger Season.

=== Prince Rapid ===
Rapid (Prince Owusu-Agyekum born 8 November 1985), is a grime musician and producer and founding member of Ruff Sqwad. Prince Rapid is one of the more active producers in the crew and is considered one of the best producers in the grime scene. He produced the group's first underground single, "Tings in Boots". He has had various solo releases including Turning Point and Rapid Fire.

In September 2015, Rapid created a war dub entitled "Pepper Riddim". This instrumental was later used in March 2015 by Chip on a song of the same name; a diss track directed at Tinie Tempah, Bugzy Malone, Devilman, Big Narstie and Saskilla. Chip's version of the song has accumulated over four million YouTube views, and sparked one of the most talked about grime beefs of the year. The instrumental has since been used by P Money, Yungen, Riko Dan and Lil Nasty among others.

=== Sir Spyro ===
Sir Spyro (born 1986), is a DJ and producer. Sir Spyro is the current DJ for Ruff Sqwad and is the tour DJ for Tinchy Stryder, he formally joined the group in 2011. Spyro has a regular show on BBC Radio 1Xtra and has released numerous solo EPs. He produced hit 'Big For Your Boots' for Stormzy.

=== Former members ===
Ruff Sqwad was founded in the year 2001 by Shifty Rydos, the original lineup also included Tinchy Stryder, Slix, Dirty Danger, Rapid, DJ Begg and Mad Max. Frequent collaborators with the crew included XTC, Roachee, Wiley and Trim. DJ Scholar became a member of Ruff Sqwad in 2004 and remained in the crew until 2010. Fuda Guy joined the crew in 2006 and released a solo mixtape while in the group called Headgone before leaving the group in 2012. In December 2016, Fuda Guy again appeared as a member of Ruff Sqwad in the song That's Who We Are. Also appearing in the song is original member Prince Rapid and Roachee, who has been affiliated with the group earlier.

== Membership ==
=== Current ===
- Prince Rapid (2001–present)
- Fuda Guy (2006–2010, 2015–present)
- Roachee (2015–present)

=== Former ===
- Tinchy Stryder (2001–2015)
- Slix (2001–2015)
- Dirty Danger (2001–2015)
- DJ Begg (2001–????)
- Mad Max (2001–2006)
- Shifty Rydos (2001–2010)
- DJ Scholar (2004–2010; died 2021)
- Sir Spyro (2011–2015)
- XTC (2001–????)

== Discography ==
=== Studio albums ===
Titles	Details
Guns and Roses Volume. 1	Released: 4 March 2005; Label: Ruff Sqwad Recordings; Formats: CD
Guns and Roses Volume. 2	Released: 13 October 2006; Label: Ruff Sqwad Recordings; Formats: CD

=== Bootleg mixtapes ===
Titles	Details
Personal Bliss Inducers	Released: 2004; Formats: digital download
Ruff Kuts	Released: 17 June 2014; Formats: digital download

=== Compilations ===
Titles	Details
White Label Classics	Released: 2012; Label: NoHatsNoHoods; Formats: CD, digital download

=== Videography ===
List of music videos, showing year released and director
Title	Year	Director(s)	Ref.
"Anna/Down"	2004	Brandon "Maniac" Jolie	
"Xtra" (Tinchy Stryder with Ruff Sqwad)	2007	Brandon "Maniac" Jolie	
"Walking U Home"	2008	Jak "FrSH" O'Hare & Brandon "Maniac" Jolie	
"RSMD"	2008	Jak "FrSH" O'Hare & Brandon "Maniac" Jolie	
"I Wanna Let U Know" (with various Grime artists)	2009	Jak "FrSH" O'Hare	
"Tryna Be Me" (Tinchy Stryder with Ruff Sqwad)	2009	Jak "FrSH" O'Hare	
"On My Own" (Blame with Ruff Sqwad)	2010	Danann Breathnach	
"Champions"	2010	Jak "FrSH" O'Hare	
"This Side"	2011	Craig Capone	
"Las Vegas"	2011	Luke Monaghan	
"Mario Balotelli"	2012	Luke Monaghan & James Barber	
"Cold"	2013	SBTV	

=== White label releases ===
- Anna
- Misty Cold
- Misty Cold Remix
- Tings in Boots
- Lethal Injection
- Love You Feel
- Pied Piper
- All Day Long
- Don't Trust/Ur Love Feels
- Together EP
- Underground/Wide Awake
- Xtra/And Ting
- Move 2 Dis
- No Base EP
- Rock EP
- From A Place
- Ruff Sqwad Man Dem

== See also ==
- Tinchy Stryder solo discography
