= Dappy discography =

- Studio albums: 2
- Extended plays: 1
- Singles: 32
- Music videos: 30
- Promotional singles: 3

The discography of Dappy, a British singer-songwriter, rapper, and actor, consists of two studio album, and four singles. He is best known for being the lead singer of the Camden-based hip hop trio N-Dubz, with his cousin Tulisa and Fazer.

== Studio albums ==
Title	Details	Peak chart positions			Certifications
Title	Details	UK	SCO	IRE	Certifications
Bad Intentions	Released: 22 October 2012; Label: AATW, Island, Takeover Entertainment; Formats: Digital download, CD	6	12	34	BPI: Gold
Fortune	Released: 12 November 2021; Label: Self-released; Formats: Digital download, CD	88	—	—	
"—" denotes a recording that did not chart or was not released.

== Extended plays ==
Title	Details	Peak chart positions
Title	Details	UK
Eros Apollo	Released: 25 December 2015; Label: 3king Records; Formats: Digital download	150

== Singles ==
=== As lead artist ===
Title	Year	Peak chart positions				Certifications	Album
Title	Year	UK	UK R&B	IRE	SCO	Certifications	Album
"Number 1" (Tinchy Stryder with Dappy)	2009	1	20	1	1	BPI: Platinum	Catch 22
"Spaceship" (Tinchy Stryder with Dappy)	2011	5	1	45	5	BPI: Silver	Non-album single
"No Regrets"	2011	1	1	8	1	BPI: Platinum	Bad Intentions
"Rockstar"	2012	2	1	15	3	BPI: Silver	Bad Intentions
"Good Intentions"	2012	12	2	24	13	BPI: Silver	Bad Intentions
"I.O.U."	2013	35	6	95	—	Kyle Burns	Bad Intentions
"Beautiful Me"	2015	19	8	80	—	BPI: Silver	Non-album singles
"100 (Built for This)"	2015	—	—	—	—		Non-album singles
"Money Can't Buy"	2015	120	—	—	—		Non-album singles
"Hip Hip Hooray"	2016	164	—	—	—		Non-album singles
"Messi"	2016	—	—	—	—		Non-album singles
"Kiss"	2016	—	—	—	—		Non-album singles
"Straight Facts"	2017	—	—	—	—		Non-album singles
"Spotlight"	2017	56	—	—	32		Non-album singles
"Trill"	2017	—	69	—	—		Non-album singles
"Oh My" (featuring Ay Em)	2018	23	—	94	—	BPI: Platinum	Non-album singles
"All We Know"	2018	64	85	—	—		Non-album singles
"Motorola" (with Da Beatfreakz, Swarmz and Deno)	2019	32	—	—	—		Non-album singles
"Not Today" (with Tory Lanez and The Plug)	2019	43	—	—	—		Non-album singles
"Pantha"	2019	—	—	—	—		Non-album singles
"Splash" (with RussMB)	2020	78	—	—	—		Non-album singles
"Freaky" (with Swarmz & POUNDZ)	2020	62	—	—	—		Non-album singles
"Intro"	2020	—	—	—	—		Fortune
"Wounds"	2021	—	—	—	—		Fortune
"—" denotes a recording that did not chart or was not released.

=== As featured artist ===
Title	Year	Peak chart positions				Certifications	Album
Title	Year	UK	UK R&B	IRE	SCO	Certifications	Album
"Explode" (Cover Drive featuring Dappy)	2012	29	6	27	27		Bajan Style
"Taking Your Side" (Jordan Morris featuring Dappy)	2014	189	—	—	—		Non-album singles
"Comfortable" (Yungen featuring Dappy)	2019	32	—	—	—	BPI: Silver	Non-album singles
"My One" (Wiley featuring Tory Lanez, Kranium and Dappy)	2019	41	—	—	81	BPI: Silver	Non-album singles
"Link Up" (Geko featuring Stefflon Don, Deno and Dappy)	2019	84	—	—	—		Non-album singles
"Oh La La" (Sneakbo featuring Dappy)	2019	—	—	—	—		Non-album singles
"+44" (Lotto Boyzz featuring Dappy)	2020	80	—	—	—	BPI: Silver	Non-album singles
"One Night" (Tom Zanetti featuring Dappy & Haze Da Martin)	2020	—	—	—	—		Non-album singles
"Expensive Touch" (Term & Rvchet featuring Amy Em, Dappy & Noizy)	2020	—	—	—	—		Non-album singles
"—" denotes a recording that did not chart or was not released.

=== Promotional singles ===
Title	Year	Peak chart positions			Album
Title	Year	UK	UK R&B	SCO	Album
"Tarzan Part 1"	2012	—	—	—	Bad Intentions
"I'm Coming (Tarzan Part 2)"	2012	35	9	39	Bad Intentions
"Yin Yang"	2015	73	14	50	Bad Intentions
"All We Know" (Remix) (with Ambush Busworl and Asco)	2018	—	—	—	Non-album singles
"Pantha Remix" (with Light)	2019	—	—	—	Non-album singles
"—" denotes a recording that did not chart or was not released.

== Other charted songs ==
Title	Year	Peak chart positions		Album
Title	Year	UK	UK R&B	Album
"Who's the Daddy" (Benny Banks featuring Dappy)	2012	128	18	Bad Intentions (Delux Edition)
