= 2011 in British music =

This is a summary of 2011 in music in the United Kingdom.

== Events ==
- 1 January – Musicians honoured in the Queen's New Year Honours list include mezzo-soprano Felicity Palmer (CBE) and composer Howard Goodall (CBE), Richard Thompson (OBE) and Annie Lennox (OBE).
- 14 April – On his sixtieth birthday, Julian Lloyd Webber gives the première of American composer Eric Whitacre's "The River Cam", written specially for the occasion.
- 29 April – The wedding of Prince William and Catherine Middleton includes original music by Paul Mealor and John Rutter as well as traditional works by British composers such as Hubert Parry's setting of the anthem "I was glad" and William Walton's "Crown Imperial".
- 10–12 June – The Download Festival 2011 takes place at Donington Park. The main stage is headlined by Def Leppard, System of a Down and Linkin Park, the second stage by Pendulum, Alice Cooper and Rob Zombie, the Pepsi Max stage by Danzig, Funeral for a Friend and Frank Turner, the Red Bull Bedroom Jam stage by Modestep, Dangerous! and H.E.A.T., and the Jägermeister Acoustic stage by Skindred, Bowling for Soup and Dave McPherson.
- 11 June – Musicians honoured in the Queen's Birthday Honours list include Bryan Ferry (CBE), broadcaster Bob Harris (OBE) and jazz singer Claire Martin (OBE).
- 6 September – PJ Harvey wins the Mercury Prize for her album Let England Shake, becoming the first (and to date, only) artist to win the accolade twice.
- 10 September – Edward Gardner conducts the Last Night of the Proms for the first time. The programme includes works by Béla Bartók and Franz Liszt as well as the traditional Elgar, and the soloist for "Rule Britannia" was Susan Bullock. A highlight is the première of Peter Maxwell Davies's Musica benevolens.
- 9 October – Sir Paul McCartney marries Nancy Shevell.
- 18 October – Ian Brown, John Squire, Mani and Reni announce the reformation of the Stone Roses at London's Soho Hotel.
- 11 December – Little Mix emerge as winners of the 2011 X Factor series. They are the first group to win in the programme's eight-year history. Marcus Collins is named runner-up, while Amelia Lily and Misha B finish in third and fourth place, respectively.

== Publications ==
- Ian Bostridge – A Singer's Notebook

== Classical music ==
=== New works ===
- Karl Jenkins – The Bards of Wales (cantata)
- Paul Mealor – Ubi Caritas et Amor
- Graham Waterhouse – Rhapsodie Macabre
- Eric Whitacre – The River Cam

=== Opera ===
- Peter Maxwell Davies – Kommilitonen!
- Jonathan Dove – Mansfield Park
- Mark-Anthony Turnage – Anna Nicole

=== Albums ===
- Nicola Benedetti – Italia
- Alfie Boe – Alfie
- Bond – Play
- Katherine Jenkins – Daydream
- Paul Lewis – Schubert: Piano Sonatas
- Julian Lloyd Webber – The Art of Julian Lloyd Webber (compilation)

== Field recordings ==
- Chris Watson – El Tren Fantasma

== Film and incidental music ==
- Lorne Balfe – Ironclad
- Neil Brand – Underground
- Jonny Greenwood – We Need to Talk About Kevin

== British music awards ==
=== BRIT Awards ===
The 2011 BRIT Awards were hosted by James Corden on 15 February 2011. The most notable winners were Tinie Tempah and Arcade Fire, both winning two awards.

- British Male Solo Artist: Plan B
- British Female Solo Artist: Laura Marling
- British Breakthrough Act: Tinie Tempah
- British Group: Take That
- MasterCard British Album: Sigh No More – Mumford & Sons
- British Single: "Pass Out" – Tinie Tempah
- International Male Solo Artist: Cee Lo Green
- International Female Solo Artist: Rihanna
- International Breakthrough Act: Justin Bieber
- International Group: Arcade Fire
- International Album: The Suburbs – Arcade Fire
- British Producer: Markus Dravs
- Critics' Choice: Jessie J

=== Classical BRIT Awards ===
The 2011 Classical BRIT Awards were held on 12 May 2011 at the Royal Albert Hall, London and hosted by Myleene Klass.

- Male Artist of the Year: Antonio Pappano
- Female Artist of the Year: Alison Balsom
- Newcomer Award: Vilde Frang
- Composer of the Year: Arvo Pärt
- Critics' Award: Tasmin Little
- Artist of the Decade: Il Divo
- Album of the Year: Moonlight Serenade – André Rieu and His Johann Strauss Orchestra
- Outstanding Contribution to Music: John Barry (posthumous)

=== Ivor Novello Awards ===
The 56th Ivor Novello Awards were held on 19 May 2011 at the Grosvenor House Hotel, London.

- Best Song Musically and Lyrically: "Becoming a Jackal" – Villagers (written by Conor O'Brien)
- Best Contemporary Song: "Pass Out" – Tinie Tempah (written by Timothy McKenzie, Patrick Okogwu and Marc Williams)
- Album Award: The Defamation of Strickland Banks – Plan B
- Best Original Film Score: How to Train Your Dragon (composed by John Powell)
- Best Original Video Game Score: Napoleon: Total War (composed by Richard Beddow, Richard Birdsall and Ian Livingstone)
- Best Television Soundtrack: Any Human Heart (composed by Dan Jones)
- Songwriter of the Year: Benjamin Drew
- Most Performed Work: "She Said" – Plan B (written by Eric Appapoulay, Richard Cassell, Benjamin Drew and Tom Wright-Goss)
- Classical Music Award: Michael Nyman
- Inspiration Award: Dizzee Rascal
- Outstanding Song Collection: Steve Winwood
- Outstanding Contribution to British Music: Paul Rodgers
- International Achievement: Matt Bellamy, Dominic Howard & Chris Wolstenholme (Muse)
- Special International Award: Stephen Sondheim

=== Mercury Prize ===
The 2011 Barclaycard Mercury Prize was awarded on 6 September 2011 to PJ Harvey for her album Let England Shake. Harvey became the first artist to win the Mercury Prize twice.

=== Popjustice £20 Music Prize ===
The 2011 Popjustice £20 Music Prize was awarded on 6 September 2011 to The Saturdays for their song "Higher".

=== British Composer Awards ===
The 2011 British Composer Awards were held on 30 November 2011 at Stationers' Hall, London and hosted by BBC Radio 3 presenters Sara Mohr-Pietsch and Andrew McGregor, with the awards presented by Michael Berkeley. There was no award in the Sonic Art category in 2011.

- Instrumental Solo or Duo: Sonata for Cello & Piano – William Sweeney
- Chamber: String Quartet No. 2 – Anthony Payne
- Vocal: Five Larkin Songs – Huw Watkins
- Choral: Allele – Michael Zev Gordon
- Wind Band or Brass Band: In Pitch Black – Lucy Pankhurst
- Orchestral: Fantasias – Julian Anderson
- Stage Works: A Ring A Lamp A Thing – Orlando Gough
- Liturgical: Bell Mass – Julian Anderson
- Contemporary Jazz Composition: The Green Seagull – Tommy Evans
- Community or Educational Project: Consider the Lilies – John Barber
- Making Music Award: I can't find brumm... – Richard Bullen
- International Award: La Mattina – Bent Sørensen
- Outreach: PK – Graham Fitkin

=== The Record of the Year ===
The 2011 Record of the Year was awarded on 10 December 2011 to Lady Gaga for her song "Born This Way".

== Charts and sales ==
=== Number-one singles ===
Chart date (week ending)	Song	Artist	Sales
1 January	"When We Collide"	Matt Cardle	262,953
8 January	"When We Collide"	Matt Cardle	113,037
15 January	"What's My Name?"	Rihanna featuring Drake	53,018
22 January	"Grenade"	Bruno Mars	149,834
29 January	"Grenade"	Bruno Mars	109,960
5 February	"We R Who We R"	Ke$ha	90,139
12 February	"Price Tag"	Jessie J featuring B.o.B	84,076
19 February	"Price Tag"	Jessie J featuring B.o.B	95,697
26 February	"Someone Like You"	Adele	111,739
5 March	"Someone Like You"	Adele	114,792
12 March	"Someone Like You"	Adele	116,347
19 March	"Someone Like You"	Adele	95,654
26 March	"Don't Hold Your Breath"	Nicole Scherzinger	98,090
2 April	"Someone Like You"	Adele	82,357
9 April	"On the Floor"	Jennifer Lopez featuring Pitbull	133,179
16 April	"On the Floor"	Jennifer Lopez featuring Pitbull	91,749
23 April	"Party Rock Anthem"	LMFAO featuring Lauren Bennett & GoonRock	91,421
30 April	"Party Rock Anthem"	LMFAO featuring Lauren Bennett & GoonRock	85,744
7 May	"Party Rock Anthem"	LMFAO featuring Lauren Bennett & GoonRock	73,076
14 May	"Party Rock Anthem"	LMFAO featuring Lauren Bennett & GoonRock	64,508
21 May	"The Lazy Song"	Bruno Mars	67,837
28 May	"Give Me Everything"	Pitbull featuring Ne-Yo, Afrojack & Nayer	71,309
4 June	"Give Me Everything"	Pitbull featuring Ne-Yo, Afrojack & Nayer	95,848
11 June	"Give Me Everything"	Pitbull featuring Ne-Yo, Afrojack & Nayer	82,210
18 June	"Changed the Way You Kiss Me"	Example	115,046
25 June	"Changed the Way You Kiss Me"	Example	75,252
2 July	"Don't Wanna Go Home"	Jason Derülo	76,581
9 July	"Don't Wanna Go Home"	Jason Derülo	60,316
16 July	"Louder"	DJ Fresh featuring Sian Evans	140,750
23 July	"Glad You Came"	The Wanted	117,165
30 July	"Glad You Came"	The Wanted	73,769
6 August	"She Makes Me Wanna"	JLS featuring Dev	98,016
13 August	"Swagger Jagger"	Cher Lloyd	66,316
20 August	"Promises"	Nero	46,700
27 August	"Don't Go"	Wretch 32 featuring Josh Kumra	76,495
3 September	"Heart Skips a Beat"	Olly Murs featuring Rizzle Kicks	109,151
10 September	"Stay Awake"	Example	73,402
17 September	"All About Tonight"	Pixie Lott	88,893
24 September	"What Makes You Beautiful"	One Direction	153,965
1 October	"No Regrets"	Dappy	96,639
8 October	"Loca People"	Sak Noel	75,161
15 October	"We Found Love"	Rihanna featuring Calvin Harris	87,573
22 October	"We Found Love"	Rihanna featuring Calvin Harris	106,553
29 October	"We Found Love"	Rihanna featuring Calvin Harris	92,689
5 November	"Read All About It"	Professor Green featuring Emeli Sandé	153,007
12 November	"Read All About It"	Professor Green featuring Emeli Sandé	85,302
19 November	"We Found Love"	Rihanna featuring Calvin Harris	79,834
26 November	"We Found Love"	Rihanna featuring Calvin Harris	66,941
3 December	"We Found Love"	Rihanna featuring Calvin Harris	79,804
10 December	"Wishing on a Star"	X Factor Finalists 2011 featuring JLS & One Direction	98,932
17 December	"Dance with Me Tonight"	Olly Murs	46,584
24 December	"Cannonball"	Little Mix	210,129
31 December	"Wherever You Are"	Military Wives & Gareth Malone	555,622

=== Number-one albums ===
Chart date (week ending)	Album	Artist	Sales
1 January	Progress	Take That	350,328
8 January	Loud	Rihanna	76,237
15 January	Loud	Rihanna	50,088
22 January	Loud	Rihanna	44,827
29 January	Doo-Wops & Hooligans	Bruno Mars	86,243
5 February	21	Adele	208,090
12 February	21	Adele	135,585
19 February	21	Adele	134,241
26 February	21	Adele	188,764
5 March	21	Adele	173,718
12 March	21	Adele	180,493
19 March	21	Adele	161,580
26 March	21	Adele	159,895
2 April	21	Adele	156,162
9 April	21	Adele	257,731
16 April	21	Adele	114,476
23 April	Wasting Light	Foo Fighters	114,557
30 April	21	Adele	91,803
7 May	21	Adele	73,771
14 May	21	Adele	80,922
21 May	21	Adele	70,362
28 May	21	Adele	51,183
4 June	Born This Way	Lady Gaga	215,639
11 June	Born This Way	Lady Gaga	67,615
18 June	Suck It and See	Arctic Monkeys	82,424
25 June	Progress	Take That	77,720
2 July	Born This Way	Lady Gaga	47,150
9 July	4	Beyoncé	89,211
16 July	4	Beyoncé	44,929
23 July	21	Adele	43,555
30 July	21	Adele	46,648
6 August	Back to Black	Amy Winehouse	44,076
13 August	Back to Black	Amy Winehouse	63,070
20 August	Back to Black	Amy Winehouse	43,726
27 August	Welcome Reality	Nero	30,640
3 September	Echoes	Will Young	65,773
10 September	I'm With You	Red Hot Chili Peppers	71,858
17 September	Playing in the Shadows	Example	56,224
24 September	+	Ed Sheeran	102,350
1 October	Velociraptor!	Kasabian	94,088
8 October	The Awakening	James Morrison	62,181
15 October	The Awakening	James Morrison	36,411
22 October	The Ultimate Collection	Steps	34,200
29 October	Noel Gallagher's High Flying Birds	Noel Gallagher's High Flying Birds	122,530
5 November	Mylo Xyloto	Coldplay	208,343
12 November	Ceremonials	Florence and the Machine	94,050
19 November	Someone To Watch Over Me	Susan Boyle	72,745
26 November	Christmas	Michael Bublé	85,787
3 December	Talk That Talk	Rihanna	163,819
10 December	In Case You Didn't Know	Olly Murs	148,532
17 December	Lioness: Hidden Treasures	Amy Winehouse	194,966
24 December	Christmas	Michael Bublé	269,665
31 December	Christmas	Michael Bublé	317,114

=== Number-one compilation albums ===
Chart date (week ending)	Album
1 January	Now 77
8 January	Now 77
15 January	Now 77
22 January	Now 77
29 January	Now 77
5 February	Now 77
12 February	Now 77
19 February	Love Songs – The Ultimate Collection
26 February	BRIT Awards 2011 With MasterCard
5 March	BRIT Awards 2011 With MasterCard
12 March	Anthems Hip Hop
19 March	Anthems Hip Hop
26 March	Massive R&B – Spring 2011
2 April	Massive R&B – Spring 2011
9 April	Massive R&B – Spring 2011
16 April	Ultimate Floorfillers
23 April	Now 78
30 April	Now 78
7 May	Now 78
14 May	Now 78
21 May	Now 78
28 May	Now 78
4 June	Now 78
11 June	Now 78
18 June	Now 78
25 June	The Old Grey Whistle Test – 40th
2 July	Now 78
9 July	Clubland 19
16 July	Clubland 19
23 July	Clubland 19
30 July	Clubland 19
6 August	Now 79
13 August	Now 79
20 August	Now 79
27 August	Now 79
3 September	Now 79
10 September	Now 79
17 September	Now 79
24 September	Now 79
1 October	Now 79
8 October	Now R&B
15 October	Now R&B
22 October	Now 79
29 October	Now 79
5 November	Pop Party 9
12 November	BBC Radio 1's Live Lounge – Vol 6
19 November	Clubland 20
26 November	Pop Party 9
3 December	Now 80
10 December	Now 80
17 December	Now 80
24 December	Now 80
31 December	Now 80

=== Best-selling singles of 2011 ===
No.	Title	Artist	Peak position	Sales
1	"Someone Like You"	Adele	1	1,242,917
2	"Moves Like Jagger"	Maroon 5 featuring Christina Aguilera	2	1,040,000
3	"Party Rock Anthem"	LMFAO featuring Lauren Bennett & GoonRock	1	900,000
4	"Price Tag"	Jessie J featuring B.o.B	1	900,000
5	"We Found Love"	Rihanna featuring Calvin Harris	1	900,000
6	"Give Me Everything"	Pitbull featuring Ne-Yo, Afrojack & Nayer	1	
7	"Grenade"	Bruno Mars	1	
8	"The A Team"	Ed Sheeran	3	800,000
9	"Rolling in the Deep"	Adele	2	
10	"On the Floor"	Jennifer Lopez featuring Pitbull	1	
11	"Jar of Hearts"	Christina Perri	4	
12	"S&M"	Rihanna	3	
13	"Wherever You Are"	Military Wives & Gareth Malone	1	
14	"Born This Way"	Lady Gaga	3	
15	"The Lazy Song"	Bruno Mars	1	
16	"Beautiful People"	Chris Brown featuring Benny Benassi	4	
17	"Changed the Way You Kiss Me"	Example	1	
18	"I Need a Dollar"	Aloe Blacc	2	
19	"Sweat"	Snoop Dogg vs. David Guetta	4	
20	"What Makes You Beautiful"	One Direction	1	
21	"Heart Skips a Beat"	Olly Murs featuring Rizzle Kicks	1	
22	"Mr. Saxobeat"	Alexandra Stan	3	
23	"Earthquake"	Labrinth featuring Tinie Tempah	2	
24	"Glad You Came"	The Wanted	1	
25	"Louder"	DJ Fresh featuring Sian Evans	1	
26	"Do It Like a Dude"	Jessie J	2	
27	"The Edge of Glory"	Lady Gaga	6	
28	"Yeah 3x"	Chris Brown	6	
29	"Set Fire to the Rain"	Adele	11	
30	"Super Bass"	Nicki Minaj	8	
31	"Sexy and I Know It"	LMFAO	5	
32	"Where Them Girls At"	David Guetta featuring Flo Rida & Nicki Minaj	3	
33	"Don't Hold Your Breath"	Nicole Scherzinger	1	
34	"Best Thing I Never Had"	Beyoncé	3	
35	"Bounce"	Calvin Harris featuring Kelis	2	
36	"E.T."	Katy Perry featuring Kanye West	3	
37	"Read All About It"	Professor Green featuring Emeli Sandé	1	
38	"Champion"	Chipmunk featuring Chris Brown	2	
39	"Paradise"	Coldplay	2 (Note: Reached number 1 in 2012)	
40	"Lego House"	Ed Sheeran	5	
41	"Cannonball"	Little Mix	1	
42	"Just Can't Get Enough"	The Black Eyed Peas	3	
43	"Who's That Chick?"	David Guetta featuring Rihanna	6	
44	"Marry You"	Bruno Mars	11	
45	"Last Friday Night (T.G.I.F.)"	Katy Perry	9	
46	"Feel So Close"	Calvin Harris	2	
47	"Don't Wanna Go Home"	Jason Derulo	1	
48	"Good Feeling"	Flo Rida	2 (Note: Reached number 1 in 2012)	
49	"What's My Name?"	Rihanna featuring Drake	1	
50	"Without You"	David Guetta featuring Usher	6	

=== Best-selling albums of 2011 ===
No.	Title	Artist	Peak position	Sales
1	21	Adele	1	3,772,346
2	Christmas	Michael Bublé	1	1,292,762
3	Doo-Wops & Hooligans	Bruno Mars	1	1,214,425
4	19	Adele	2 (Note: Reached number 1 in 2008)	1,210,417
5	Mylo Xyloto	Coldplay	1	907,000
6	Loud	Rihanna	1	876,000
7	Born This Way	Lady Gaga	1	821,000
8	Who You Are	Jessie J	2	805,000
9	+	Ed Sheeran	1	791,000
10	Talk That Talk	Rihanna	1	655,000
11	Lioness: Hidden Treasures	Amy Winehouse	1	638,000
12	In Case You Didn't Know	Olly Murs	1	597,000
13	The Lady Killer	Cee Lo Green	3	560,000
14	Noel Gallagher's High Flying Birds	Noel Gallagher's High Flying Birds	1	492,000
15	Progress	Take That	1	484,000
16	Up All Night	One Direction	2	468,000
17	No More Idols	Chase and Status	2	461,000
18	4	Beyoncé	1	451,000
19	Greatest Hits	Westlife	4	423,000
20	Crazy Love	Michael Bublé	3 (Note: Reached number 1 in 2009)	410,000
21	The Defamation of Strickland Banks	Plan B	2 (Note: Reached number 1 in 2010)	
22	Ceremonials	Florence and the Machine	1	
23	Echoes	Will Young	1	
24	Wasting Light	Foo Fighters	1	
25	Teenage Dream	Katy Perry	8 (Note: Reached number 1 in 2010)	
26	Heaven	Rebecca Ferguson	3	
27	Sigh No More	Mumford & Sons	2	
28	Disc-Overy	Tinie Tempah	4 (Note: Reached number 1 in 2010)	
29	Jukebox	JLS	2	
30	The Fame	Lady Gaga	7 (Note: Reached number 1 in 2009)	
31	Build a Rocket Boys!	Elbow	2	
32	Back to Black	Amy Winehouse	1	
33	Someone to Watch Over Me	Susan Boyle	1	
34	Good Ol' Fashioned Love	The Overtones	4	
35	Deleted Scenes from the Cutting Room Floor	Caro Emerald	4	
36	The Awakening	James Morrison	1	
37	Velociraptor!	Kasabian	1	
38	Seasons of My Soul	Rumer	4 (Note: Reached number 3 in 2010)	
39	Lights	Ellie Goulding	5 (Note: Reached number 1 in 2010)	
40	Fallen Empires	Snow Patrol	3	
41	Nothing But the Beat	David Guetta	2	
42	Last Night on Earth	Noah and the Whale	8	
43	Playing in the Shadows	Example	1	
44	Bring Him Home	Alfie Boe	9	
45	Greatest Hits... So Far!!!	Pink	12 (Note: Reached number 5 in 2010)	
46	Alfie	Alfie Boe	6	
47	Olly Murs	Olly Murs	4 (Note: Reached number 2 in 2010)	
48	Classic	Joe McElderry	2	
49	Letters	Matt Cardle	2	
50	Suck It and See	Arctic Monkeys	1	

=== Platinum records ===
For a record to be certified platinum, it must sell a minimum of 600,000 copies. However, not every song that sells 600,000 copies is given platinum certification and so this is not a complete list of songs that have sold 600,000 copies in 2011. Also note that a song certified platinum could have sold its 600,000th copy long before it is given certification.

Artist	Song	Date released	Date certified platinum
Cee Lo Green	"Forget You"	4 October 2010	7 January 2011
Rihanna	"Only Girl (In the World)"	25 October 2010	7 January 2011
Rihanna featuring Drake	"What's My Name?"	20 December 2010	6 March 2011
Tinie Tempah	"Pass Out"	17 April 2010	11 March 2011
Katy Perry	"Firework"	26 November 2010	11 March 2011
Adele	"Someone Like You"	24 January 2011	1 April 2011
Pitbull/Ne-Yo/Afrojack/Nayer	"Give Me Everything"	1 April 2011	16 September 2011

== Deaths ==
- 4 January
  - Mick Karn – English multi-instrumentalist musician and songwriter, 52
  - Gerry Rafferty – Scottish singer-songwriter, 63
- 14 January – Trish Keenan, singer (Broadcast), 42 (swine flu).
- 16 January – Steve Prestwich, British-born Australian drummer and songwriter (Cold Chisel, Little River Band), 56
- 26 January – Eddie Mordue, saxophonist, 83
- 28 January
  - Raymond Cohen, violinist, 91
  - Dame Margaret Price, operatic soprano, 69
- 30 January – John Barry, British film composer, 77
- 31 January – Mark Ryan, guitarist (Adam and the Ants), 51
- 3 February – Tony Levin, jazz drummer, 71
- 6 February
  - Gary Moore, guitarist and songwriter, 58
  - James Watson, trumpeter, 59
- 14 February – George Shearing, jazz pianist, 91
- 27 February – Margaret Eliot, music teacher, 97
- 8 March – Richard Campbell, cellist, 55
- 15 March
  - Smiley Culture, reggae singer and DJ, 48 (stabbing)
  - Keith Fordyce, radio DJ and TV presenter, 82
- 17 March – J. B. Steane, music critic, 83
- 18 March – Jet Harris, guitarist (The Shadows), 71
- 20 March – Johnny Pearson, pianist, arranger and TV composer, 85
- 29 March – Robert Tear, operatic tenor, 72
- 31 March – Ishbel MacAskill, Scottish Gaelic singer and heritage campaigner, 70
- 25 April – Poly Styrene – singer, (X-Ray Spex), 53 (cancer)
- 29 April – David Mason, trumpeter, 85
- 7 May – Big George, arranger, 53 (heart attack)
- 19 May – Kathy Kirby, singer, 72
- 29 May – Simon Brint, musician, composer, actor and comedian (Raw Sex), 60 (suicide)
- 10 June – Kenny Hawkes, DJ and music producer, 42 (liver failure)
- 22 June
  - Cyril Ornadel, conductor and composer, 86
  - Mike Waterson, folk singer, 70
- 24 June – Goff Richards, English composer, 66
- 9 July – Würzel, guitarist, 61
- 14 July – Eric Delaney, percussionist and bandleader, 87
- 15 July – Cuddly Dudley, rock and roll singer, 87
- 23 July – Amy Winehouse, singer, musician, 27 (alcohol poisoning)
- 3 August – Andrew McDermott, singer (Threshold), 45 (kidney failure)
- 15 August – Betty Thatcher, lyricist, 67
- 10 September – Graham Collier, jazz bassist, 74
- 21 September – John Du Cann, guitarist (Atomic Rooster), 66
- 2 October – David Bedford, composer, 74
- 5 October – Bert Jansch, singer, musician, 67
- 15 October – Betty Driver, singer and actress, 91
- 18 October – Bob Brunning, blues musician (Fleetwood Mac), 68
- 21 October – Edmundo Ros, Trinidadian band leader, 100
- 28 October – Beryl Davis, singer, 87
- 29 October – Sir Jimmy Savile, DJ, 84
- 6 November – Gordon Beck, jazz pianist and composer, 75
- 24 November – Ross MacManus, trumpeter, 84
- 26 November – Keef Hartley, drummer and bandleader, 67
- 6 December – Tony Fell, music publisher, 79
- 12 December – John Gardner, composer, 94

== See also ==
- 2011 in British radio
- 2011 in British television
- 2011 in the United Kingdom
- List of British films of 2011
