= List of 1Xtra Chart number-one singles of the 2010s =

This is the list of the number-one singles of the 1Xtra Chart during the 2010s, as of 4 March 2012.

== Number-one singles ==
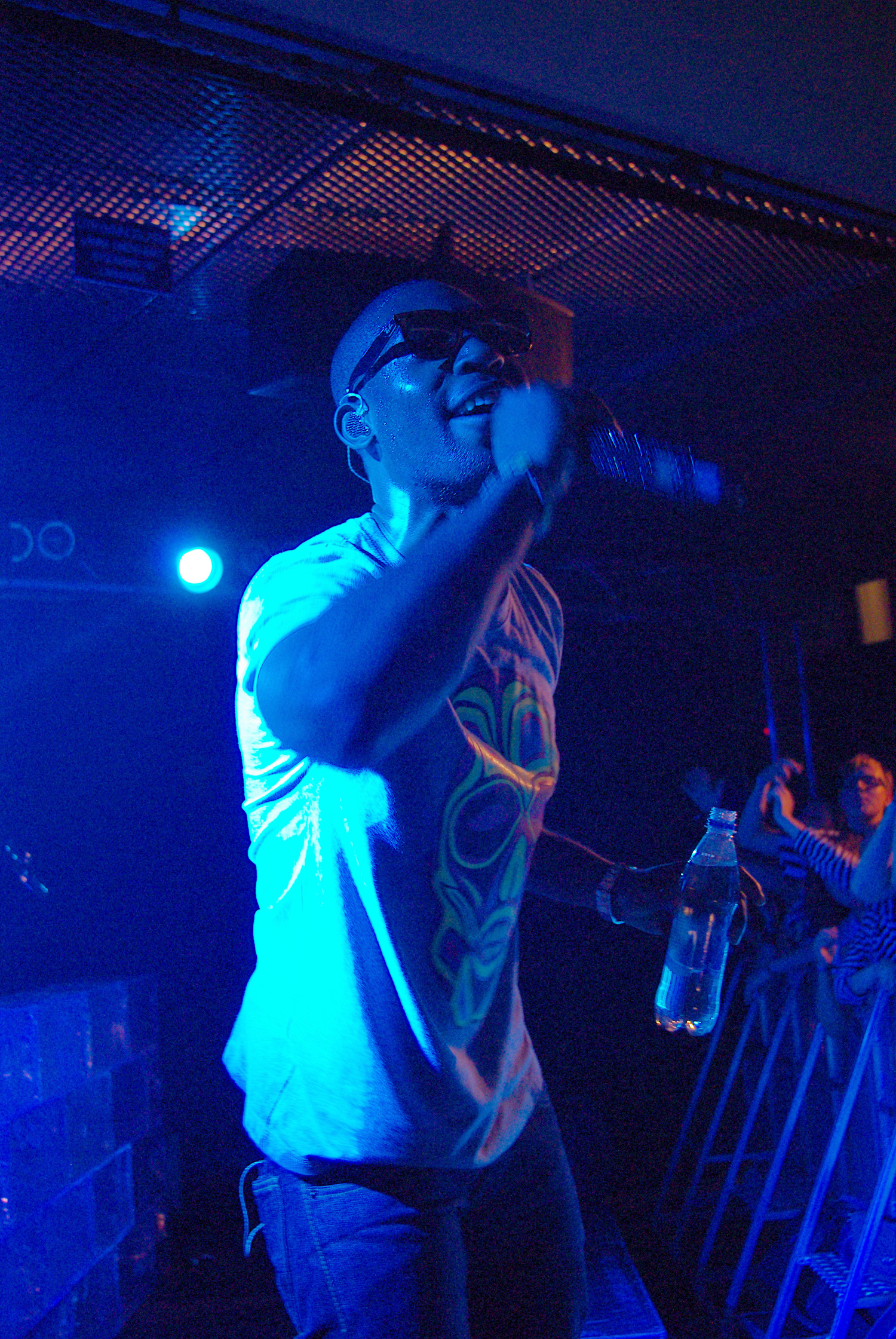
Tinie Tempah has topped the chart with three singles so far this decade.

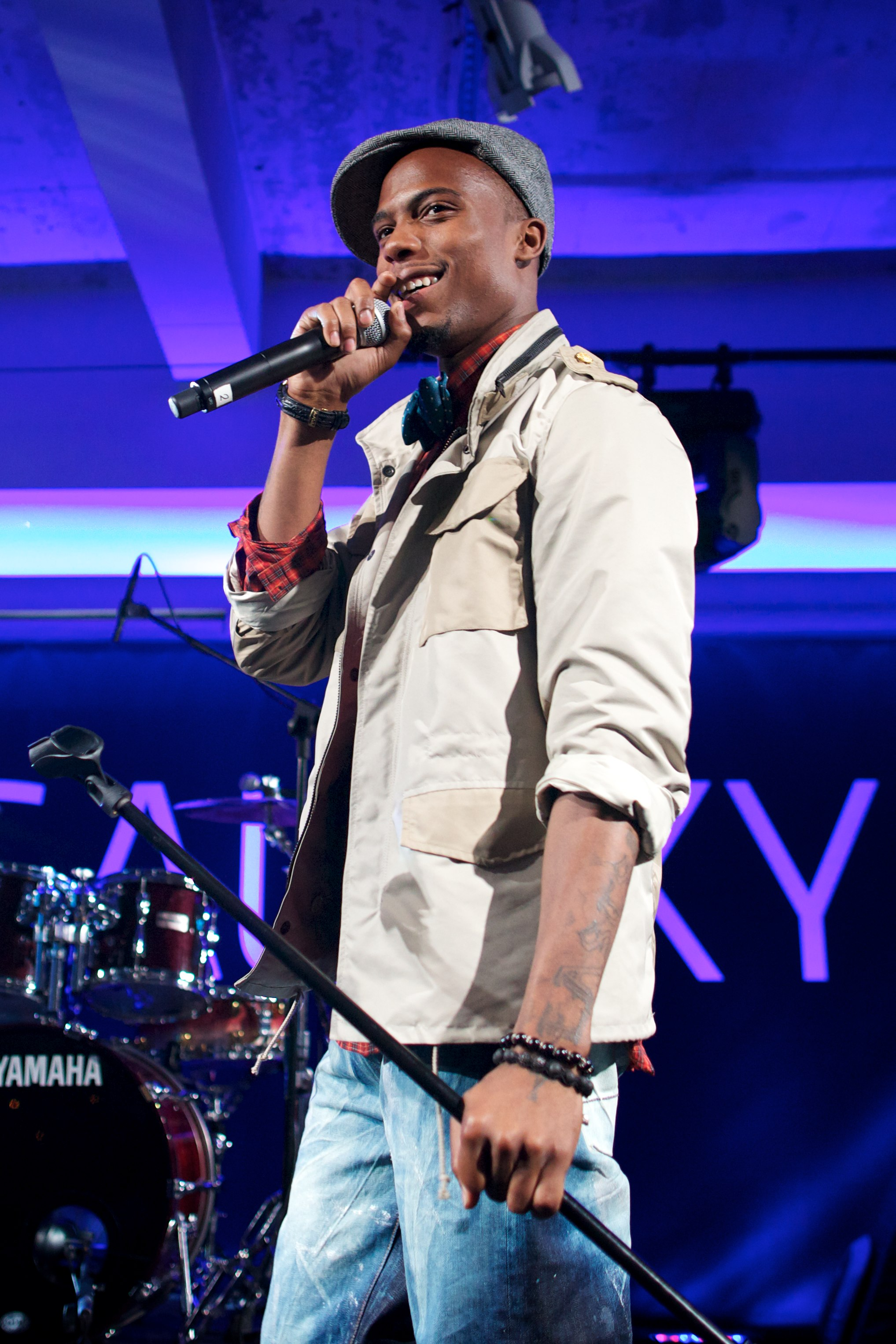
American rapper B.o.B has spent 12 weeks at number one during the 2010s.

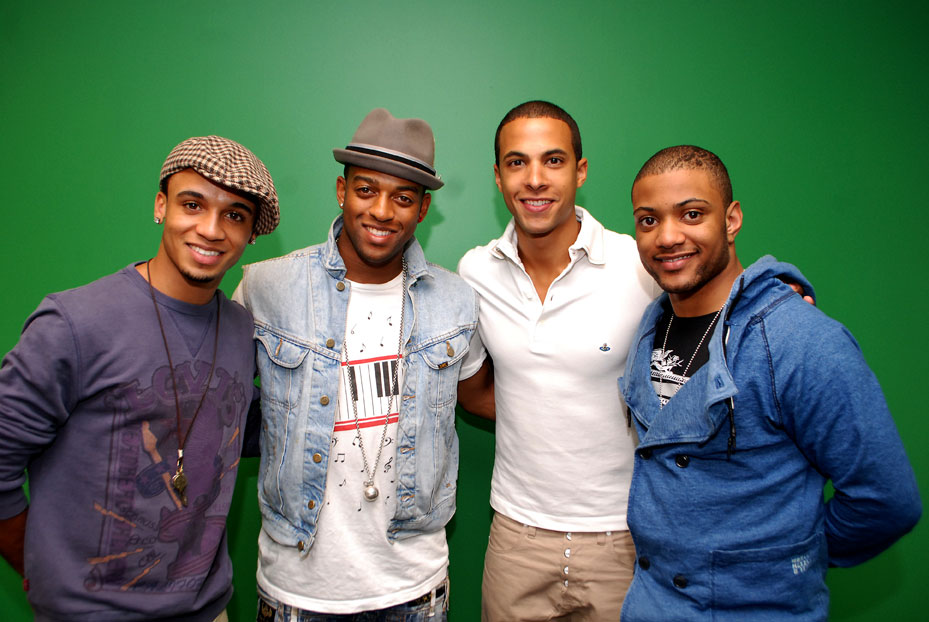
British boy band JLS have spent five weeks at number one, with three singles.

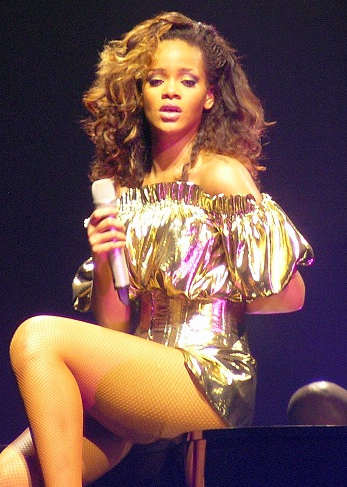
Rihanna has topped the chart for 13-week during the 2010s, longer than any other act.

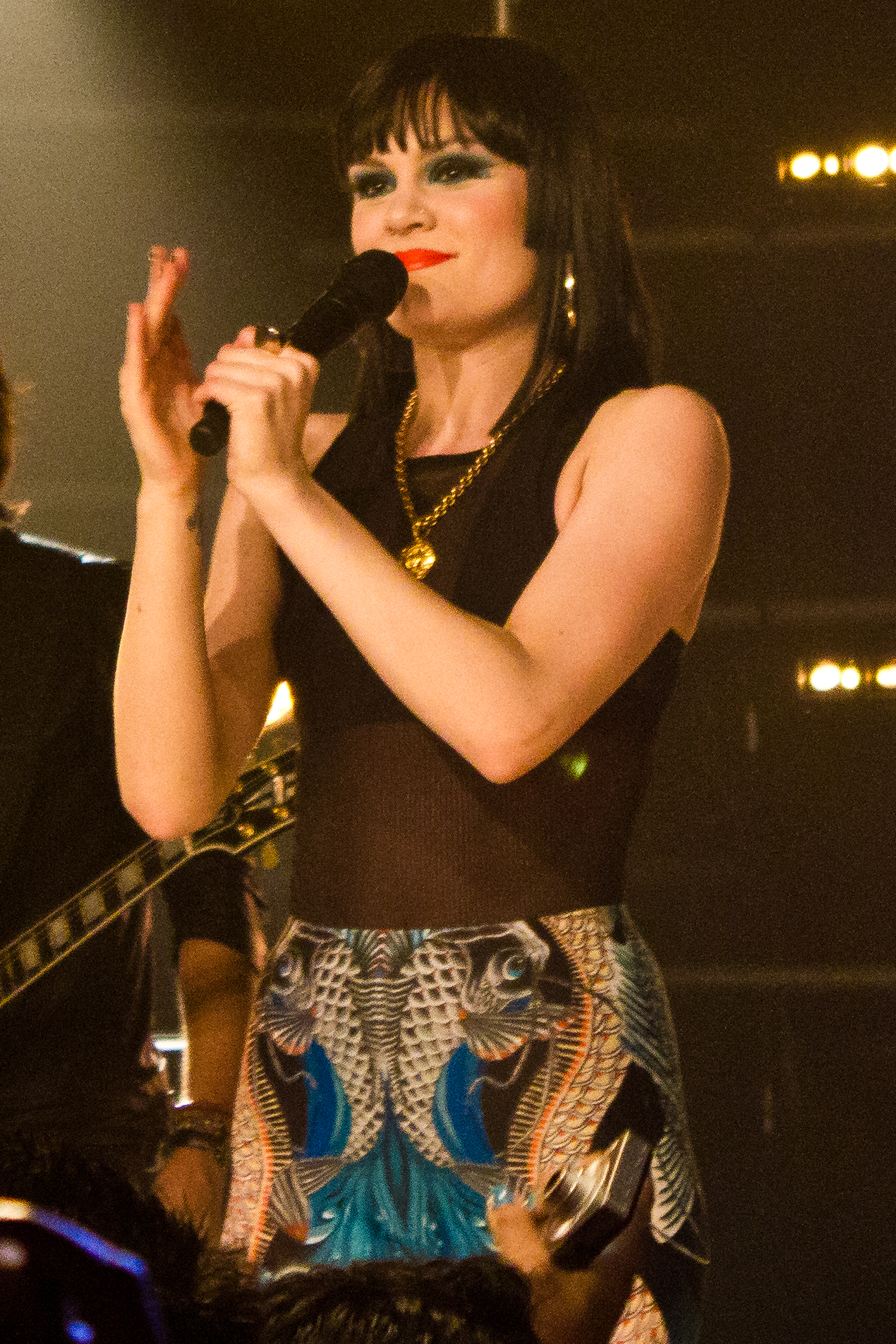
Jessie J has been at the top of 1Xtra Chart for 11 weeks this decade.

| Artist (Note: The artist, single, date of reaching number one and number of weeks at number one are those given by the Official Charts Company.) | Single | Record label (Note: The record labels are those given by the Official Charts Company.) | Reached number one | Weeks at number one |
2010
| Iyaz | "Replay" | Reprise | 24 January 2010 | 1 |
| Timbaland featuring Katy Perry | "If We Ever Meet Again" | Interscope | 31 January 2010 | 4 |
| Florence and the Machine & Dizzee Rascal | "You Got the Dirtee Love" | Island/Dirtee Stank | 28 February 2010 | 1 |
| Tinie Tempah | "Pass Out" | Parlophone | 7 March 2010 | 4 |
| Plan B | "She Said" | 679/Atlantic | 4 April 2010 | 1 |
| Usher featuring will.i.am | "OMG" | LaFace | 11 April 2010 | 2 |
| Chipmunk featuring Esmée Denters | "Until You Were Gone" | Columbia | 25 April 2010 | 1 |
| Roll Deep | "Good Times" | Relentless/Virgin | 2 May 2010 | 3 |
| B.o.B featuring Bruno Mars | "Nothin' on You" | Atlantic | 23 May 2010 | 1 |
| Dizzee Rascal | "Dirtee Disco" | Dirtee Stank | 30 May 2010 | 1 |
| B.o.B featuring Bruno Mars | "Nothin' on You" | Atlantic | 6 June 2010 | 1 |
| Tinie Tempah featuring Labrinth | "Frisky" | Parlophone | 13 June 2010 | 1 |
| Shout for England featuring Dizzee Rascal and James Corden | "Shout" | Syco | 20 June 2010 | 1 |
| K'naan | "Wavin' Flag" | A&M | 27 June 2010 | 1 |
| B.o.B featuring Hayley Williams | "Airplanes" | Atlantic | 4 July 2010 | 1 |
| JLS | "The Club Is Alive" | Epic | 11 July 2010 | 1 |
| B.o.B featuring Hayley Williams | "Airplanes" | Atlantic | 18 July 2010 | 2 |
| Travie McCoy featuring Bruno Mars | "Billionaire" | Atlantic | 1 August 2010 | 1 |
| Ne-Yo | "Beautiful Monster" | Mercury | 8 August 2010 | 1 |
| Flo Rida featuring David Guetta | "Club Can't Handle Me" | Atlantic | 15 August 2010 | 1 |
| Roll Deep | "Green Light" | Relentless/Virgin | 22 August 2010 | 1 |
| Taio Cruz | "Dynamite" | Island | 29 August 2010 | 2 |
| Alexandra Burke featuring Laza Morgan | "Start Without You" | Syco | 12 September 2010 | 2 |
| Bruno Mars | "Just the Way You Are" | Elektra | 26 September 2010 | 1 |
| Tinie Tempah featuring Eric Turner | "Written in the Stars" | Parlophone | 3 October 2010 | 1 |
| Cee Lo Green | "Forget You" | Warner Bros. | 10 October 2010 | 2 |
| Bruno Mars | "Just the Way You Are" | Elektra | 24 October 2010 | 1 |
| Rihanna | "Only Girl (In the World)" | Def Jam | 31 October 2010 | 3 |
| JLS | "Love You More" | Epic | 21 November 2010 | 2 |
| Far East Movement featuring Cataracs and Dev | "Like a G6" | Interscope/Cherrytree | 5 December 2010 | 1 |
| The Black Eyed Peas | "The Time (Dirty Bit)" | Interscope | 12 December 2010 | 1 |
| Rihanna featuring Drake | "What's My Name?" | Def Jam | 19 December 2010 | 4 |
2011
| Bruno Mars | "Grenade" | Elektra | 16 January 2011 | 3 |
| Jessie J featuring B.o.B | "Price Tag" | Island/Lava | 6 February 2011 | 1 |
| Chipmunk featuring Chris Brown | "Champion" | Jive | 13 February 2011 | 1 |
| Jessie J featuring B.o.B | "Price Tag" | Island/Lava | 20 February 2011 | 6 |
| The Black Eyed Peas | "Just Can't Get Enough" | Interscope | 3 April 2011 | 3 |
| Wretch 32 featuring Example | "Unorthodox" | Levels/Ministry of Sound | 24 April 2011 | 1 |
| Bruno Mars | "The Lazy Song" | Elektra | 1 May 2011 | 3 |
| Pitbull featuring Ne-Yo, Afrojack and Nayer | "Give Me Everything" | J | 22 May 2011 | 4 |
| Ed Sheeran | "The A Team" | Asylum | 19 June 2011 | 1 |
| Jason Derülo | "Don't Wanna Go Home" | Warner Bros. | 26 June 2011 | 2 |
| DJ Fresh featuring Sian Evans | "Louder" | Ministry of Sound | 10 July 2011 | 3 |
| JLS featuring Dev | "She Makes Me Wanna" | Epic | 31 July 2011 | 2 |
| Nero | "Promises" | MTA | 14 August 2011 | 1 |
| Wretch 32 featuring Josh Kumra | "Don't Go" | Levels/Ministry of Sound | 21 August 2011 | 1 |
| Ed Sheeran | "You Need Me, I Don't Need You" | Asylum | 28 August 2011 | 3 |
| Dappy | "No Regrets" | AATW/Island | 18 September 2011 | 3 |
| Rihanna featuring Calvin Harris | "We Found Love" | Def Jam | 9 October 2011 | 2 |
| Professor Green featuring Emeli Sandé | "Read All About It" | Virgin | 23 October 2011 | 2 |
| Rihanna featuring Calvin Harris | "We Found Love" | Def Jam | 6 November 2011 | 4 |
| Flo Rida | "Good Feeling" | Atlantic | 4 December 2011 | 1 |
| Lloyd featuring André 3000 & Lil Wayne | "Dedication to My Ex (Miss That)" | Interscope | 11 December 2011 | 2 |
| Flo Rida | "Good Feeling" | Atlantic | 25 December 2011 | 2 |
2012
| Jessie J | "Domino" | Island/Lava | 8 January 2012 | 4 |
| will.i.am featuring Mick Jagger and Jennifer Lopez | "T.H.E. (The Hardest Ever)" | Interscope | 5 February 2012 | 1 |
| DJ Fresh featuring Rita Ora | "Hot Right Now" | Ministry of Sound | 12 February 2012 | 1 |
| Emeli Sandé | "Next to Me" | Virgin | 19 February 2012 | 1 |
| Dappy featuring Brian May | "Rockstar" | AATW/Island | 26 February 2012 | 1 |

=== By artist ===
As of 4 March 2012, eight artists have spent five or more weeks at the top of the 1Xtra Chart so far during the 2010s. The totals below include only credited performances, and do not include appearances as members of groups such as the Black Eyed Peas.

| Artist | Number-one singles | Weeks at number one |
|---|---|---|
| Rihanna | 3 | 13 |
| B.o.B | 3 | 12 |
| Bruno Mars | 5 | 11 |
| Jessie J | 2 | 11 |
| Tinie Tempah | 3 | 6 |
| Calvin Harris | 1 | 6 |
| JLS | 3 | 5 |
| Ne-Yo | 2 | 5 |

=== By record label ===
As of 4 March 2012, eight record labels have spent six or more weeks at the top of the 1Xtra Chart so far during the 2010s.

| Record label | Number-one singles | Weeks at number one |
|---|---|---|
| Island Records | 6 | 17 |
| Def Jam Records | 3 | 13 |
| Interscope Records | 6 | 12 |
| Lava Records | 2 | 10 |
| Atlantic Records | 6 | 9 |
| Elektra Records | 3 | 8 |
| Virgin Records | 4 | 7 |
| Parlophone | 3 | 6 |

== See also ==
- List of UK Singles Chart number ones of the 2010s
- Lists of UK R&B Singles Chart number ones
