= Off the Record (Tinchy Stryder song) =

2011 single by Tinchy Strider

Single by Tinchy Stryder featuring Calvin Harris and Burns
- Released: 4 November 2011
- Recorded: August 2011
- Studio: Fly Eye (London, United Kingdom)
- Genre: Electro; grime; hip house; dance-pop
- Length: 3:30
- Label: Takeover; Island
- Composer: Kwasi Danquah III
- Lyricist: TMS
- Producers: Calvin Harris; BURNS

Tinchy Stryder singles chronology
"Spaceship" (2011)	"Off the Record" (2011)	"Teardrop" (2011)

Calvin Harris singles chronology
"We Found Love" (2011)	"Off the Record" (2011)	"Let's Go" (2012)

BURNS singles chronology
"Off the Record" (2011)	"Lies" (2012)

Music video
- "Off the Record" on YouTube

"Off the Record" is a song by British rapper Tinchy Stryder. The song features British music producers Calvin Harris and Matt Burns (credited as BURNS). It was meant to be the second single from his fourth studio album, entitled Full Tank, but Full Tank was scrapped, so it became a non-album single. It was released on 4 November 2011 as a digital download. The song was co-written by Stryder and the production trio TMS and was co-produced by Calvin Harris and BURNS, in August 2011. The single had its debut in BBC Radio 1Xtra's on 15 September 2011. The song peaked at number 24 on the UK Singles Chart.

== Background and release ==
"Off the Record" was written by Tinchy Stryder and the production trio TMS. TMS are the producers of Stryder's 2011 hit single "Spaceship" featuring Dappy, which peaked at number five on the UK Singles Chart, and Dappy's 2011 debut single "No Regrets", which topped the UK Singles Chart. The song was produced by the Three Six Zero Group duo of Calvin Harris and Matt Burns (credited as BURNS), in August 2011.

According to an interview with music journalist, Lina Bastidas of PopDash website on 3 November 2011, Stryder stated that the track's lyrics were inspired by his life currently feeling like he is on a rollercoaster, at the time of the song production.

The song additionally makes reference to Calvin Harris' song "The Girls", when Tinchy Stryder sings, "Calvin gets the girls, he's got all the girls, ohh look.", as well as referencing Katy Perry's song I Kissed a Girl when he sings, "Her Katy Perry's awesome. She kissed a girl..."

== Music video ==
The concept for the music video was based on the notorious phrase or saying of "What Happens in Vegas, Stays in Vegas". The music video was filmed in Las Vegas, Nevada, United States, by Tinchy Stryder's music video production partners Luke Monaghan & James Barber, to accompany the release of "Off The Record". Monaghan and Barber were also two of the three directors of Stryder's 2011 Mobo Award winning music video for his previous 2011 hit single in the UK, "Spaceship".

=== Synopsis ===
In the music video, Tinchy Stryder at the MGM Grand Adventures Theme Park (top) to enliven scenes in the MGM Grand Las Vegas hotel suite (middle) closing scene of the music video with Tinchy Stryder blowing out the candles on his Star In The Hood decorated Birthday cake (bottom).

The music video finds Stryder in a Red colored Mustang driving, followed by him being on roller coaster at the MGM Grand Adventures Theme Park, with a group of females, whilst at the same time he proceeds with anthemic choruses over electro house beats.

The second scene finds Stryder at the luxurious MGM Grand Las Vegas hotel, where he is first seen in the hotel casino gambling, then dawn has approached and he proceeds to his suite at the hotel, where there is a hotel party, and is accompanied by a group of females and cameo appearances from a few Ruff Sqwad members and the production trio TMS are made.

Once in the hotel suite, he continues with the song choruses, whilst being on the bed in the hotel suite with a few females wearing Star In The Hood halternecks and monokini's, accompanying him on the bed, the females begin to have a pillow fight whilst fumbling Tinchy Stryder at the same time, then Stryder throws, US$1,000 banknotes, at the females accompanying him on the bed before Stryder later begins to proceed with rhymes that come thick and fast over futuristic post-dubstep beats, which is then proceeded by an X-rated footage of a naked female in a bathtub being covered with a bottle of Baileys Irish Cream.

The remaining final scenes in the music video are split with footage of a few members of the grime supergroup and production team Ruff Sqwad, production team TMS, and of Stryder celebrating his 25th birthday, dancing with a group of females on the balcony of an MGM Grand Las Vegas hotel suite, then finally closing the music video with him blowing out the candles on his Star In The Hood decorated Birthday cake.

The music video was released on Tinchy Stryder's Vevo via YouTube channel on 29 September 2011.

== Live performances ==
On Wednesday, 5 October 2011, Tinchy Stryder performed the song live at the 2011 MOBO Awards (Music of Black Origin), which was held at the SECC (Scottish Exhibition and Conference Centre) in Glasgow, Scotland. On Sunday, 30 October 2011, Tinchy Stryder performed the song on the UK television show, The Xtra Factor.

== Track listing ==
Digital download
No.	Title	Length
1.	"Off the Record" (Album Version)	3:50
2.	"Off the Record" (Raw Remix)	6:55
3.	"Off the Record" (High Level Remix)	6:50
4.	"Off the Record" (Steve More Remix)	7:37
5.	"Off the Record" (Music Video)	3:30
Total length:		27:22

== Chart performance ==
Chart (2011)	Peak position
Scottish Singles Sales (Official Charts)	23
UK Dance (Official Charts)	5
UK Singles (Official Charts)	24

== Release history ==
Date	Format	Label
4 November 2011	Digital Download	Takeover; Island
