= Motorola (disambiguation) =

Motorola was an American multinational telecommunications company which split in 2011.

Motorola may also refer to:

- Motorola Mobility, mobile phone manufacturer
- Motorola Solutions, equipment provider
- Arsen Pavlov (1983–2016), known by his nom de guerre Motorola, pro-Russian separatist of the Donbass War
- Binatone, electronics manufacturer using the brand name Motorola
- "Motorola", a 2018 song by Gorgon City
- "Motorola", a 2019 song by Da Beatfreakz, Swarmz, Deno and Dappy
- "Motorola Semiconductor Components Group" became Onsemi
- Motorrolla (band), Ukrainian rock band

== See also ==
- Mortola (disambiguation)
