= Now That's What I Call R&B =

Now That's What I Call: R&B

Compilation album by Various artists
- Released: 23 September 2011
- Recorded: 2010, 2011
- Genre: Pop, R&B
- Label: Sony Music Entertainment, EMI, Virgin Music Group, UMG, Warner Music Group

Now That's What I Call: R&B is a double-disc compilation album released on September 26, 2011.

Now R&B features four songs which reached number one on the UK Singles Chart: "No Regrets", "Don't Go", "Don't Wanna Go Home" and "Party Rock Anthem".

== Track listing ==
=== Disc 1 ===
No.	Title	Artist	Length
1.	"No Regrets"	Dappy	3:57
2.	"Cheers (Drink to That)"	Rihanna	4:21
3.	"Heaven"	Emeli Sandé	4:11
4.	"Marry You"	Bruno Mars	3:50
5.	"Coming Home"	Diddy - Dirty Money feat. Skylar Grey	3:58
6.	"Let Me Go"	Maverick Sabre	3:31
7.	"I Need a Dollar"	Aloe Blacc	4:03
8.	"Bright Lights, Bigger City"	Cee Lo Green	3:38
9.	"Free"	Natalia Kills feat. will.i.am	4:28
10.	"Spaceship"	Tinchy Stryder feat. Dappy	3:33
11.	"Down on Me"	Jeremih feat. 50 Cent	3:48
12.	"Wonderman"	Tinie Tempah feat. Ellie Goulding	3:39
13.	"In the Dark"	Dev	3:46
14.	"Black and Yellow"	Wiz Khalifa	3:37
15.	"Like a G6"	Far East Movement feat. the Cataracs & Dev	3:36
16.	"Nobody's Perfect"	Jessie J	4:19
17.	"My Last"	Big Sean feat. Chris Brown	4:14
18.	"One in a Million"	Ne-Yo	4:03
19.	"Just a Dream"	Nelly	3:57
20.	"Motivation"	Kelly Rowland feat. Lil Wayne	3:51

=== Disc 2 ===
No.	Title	Artist	Length
1.	"Don't Go"	Wretch 32 feat. Josh Kumra	3:48
2.	"Lick Ya Down"	Cover Drive	3:21
3.	"Wet"	Nicole Scherzinger	4:04
4.	"I'm into You"	Jennifer Lopez feat. Lil Wayne	3:54
5.	"Don't Wanna Go Home"	Jason Derulo	3:26
6.	"Down with the Trumpets"	Rizzle Kicks	3:07
7.	"Who's Laughing Now"	Jessie J	3:09
8.	"Beautiful People"	Chris Brown feat. Benny Benassi	4:22
9.	"Hitz"	Chase & Status feat. Tinie Tempah	4:17
10.	"Super Bass"	Nicki Minaj	3:15
11.	"Buzzin'"	Mann feat. 50 Cent	3:44
12.	"Party Rock Anthem"	LMFAO feat. Lauren Bennett & GoonRock	4:25
13.	"Sweat"	Snoop Dogg vs. David Guetta	4:07
14.	"Don't Stop the Party"	The Black Eyed Peas	3:48
15.	"Pretty Girl Rock"	Keri Hilson	3:46
16.	"All the Boyz"	Duchess	3:41
17.	"Girls"	N-Dubz	2:47
18.	"In the Air"	True Tiger feat. Professor Green & Maverick Sabre	3:50
19.	"Miami 2 Ibiza"	Swedish House Mafia vs. Tinie Tempah	3:40
20.	"Amnesia"	Skepta	3:41

== Charts ==
Chart (2012)	Peak Position
UK Compilations Chart	1
UK Download Albums Chart	8

== Release history ==
Country	Release date
Ireland	23 September 2011
United Kingdom	26 September 2011
