= I'm Coming (Tarzan Part 2) =

- "I'm Coming (Tarzan Part 2)" cover

Promotional single by Dappy

from the album Bad Intentions
- Released: 3 July 2012
- Recorded: May 2012: Toronto, Canada
- Genre: Hardcore hip hop
- Length: 3:46
- Label: Takeover Entertainment; All Around the World
- Songwriters: Costadinos Contostavlos; Sam Gumbley
- Producer: S-X

Music video
- "I'm Coming (Tarzan Part 2)" on YouTube

Audio sample
- "I'm Coming (Tarzan Part 2)": file; help

"I'm Coming (Tarzan Part 2)" is a promotional single recorded by English rapper Dappy. Taken from his debut studio album Bad Intentions (2012). The song was produced by S-X and written by Dappy. The promotional track was digitally released worldwide by Takeover Entertainment on 5 August 2012 and charted at number 35 on the UK Singles Chart in its first week of release on 14 July 2012. Upon release the song sparked much controversy and was challenged by critics for its provocative and explicit themes.

== Background ==
"I'm Coming (Tarzan Part 2)" is the sequel to Dappy's freestyle song over "Racks" by YC, titled "Tarzan Freestyle" and was released on 16 August 2011 via SB.TV as a music video. The song accumulated over 1 million views and popularised over the web, resulting in Dappy composing a sequel. "I'm Coming" contains original production by S-X, while lyrically the song mentions many British stars; Wiley, Tinie Tempah, Kelly Rowland and targeting rappers Scorcher and Bashy, along with Dappy replying to Simon Cowell concerning comments about himself. Cowell is further mocked, as is The X Factor and former contestants Joe McElderry and Alexandra Burke.

== Critical reception ==
Lily Allen has defended Dappy's controversial single, hailing it "thoroughly entertaining and insightful". Allen hit back at the negative reaction on Twitter to the track "I'm Coming (Tarzan Part 2)" – which has lyrics riddled with expletives, references to cancer and rape and attacking The X Factor – insisting critics had missed the humour.

Lily Allen said:

"Dappy's new tune is jokes, in a good way. Thoroughly entertaining and insightful which is more than I can say for most things on the radio.

"Sorry, how is it insensitive or insulting? Explain, or is it just offensive to mention the word.

"And also, since when is music meant to be politically correct?
Why people are so shocked by it is beyond me [sic]."

— Lily Allen

The song also provoked grime artist Scorcher to write a diss track, over Dappy's "Spaceship" instrumental, after Dappy mentioned his name on the track.

== Music video ==
The music video for the song was directed by Morgan Keyz, and was uploaded to YouTube on 3 July 2012. As it reached over 225,000 views the video was taken down and re-uploaded on 7 July at a total length of 3 minutes and forty-eight seconds. The original music video featured a message in the opening credits which read "Free Leo Chindamo", a school friend of Dappy. This message sparked major controversy by the public as Chindamo was jailed for life for the murder of London headmaster Philip Lawrence in 2005. Lawrence's widow Frances spoke about Dappy's careless actions to The Sun: "I haven’t heard the song yet. But I don’t think it is right someone should be making money from using his name in a song." Dappy apologised via Twitter, saying: "Just wanted to say I honestly wasn't aware he did that, I knew his brother from when I was young. In no way did I intend to cause any upset and certainly didn't know about his past. My heart goes out to Mr Laurence's (sic) family and I know the pain of losing a loved one, sincerely Daps."

As the video was re-uploaded to SB.TV's channel it regained views, totalling to 1.9 million views within less than 3 months. The video features British comedian and entertainer Poets Corner.

== Track listing ==
Digital download
No.	Title	Length
1.	"I'm Coming (Tarzan Part 2)" (Explicit)	3:46
Total length:		3:46

== Chart performance ==
Chart (2012)	Peak position
Scotland Singles (OCC)	39
UK Hip Hop/R&B (OCC)	9
UK Singles (OCC)	35

== Release history ==
Region	Date	Format	Label
United Kingdom	3 July 2012	Digital Download	All Around the World Productions & Universal Music Group
Worldwide	5 August 2012	Digital Download	Takeover Entertainment Private Limited Company
