= Anthony Fell =

Anthony Fell may refer to:

- Anthony Fell (politician) (1914–1998), British politician, Member of Parliament for Great Yarmouth
- Tony Fell (1932–2011), British businessman, musician and music administrator
- Anthony S. Fell (active since 1980), Canadian businessman
