= Contostavlos =

Contostavlos is a surname of Greek origin

- Byron Contostavlos (died 2007), British rocker bass player
- Costadinos Contostavlos, a.k.a. "Dappy" (born 1987), British singer-songwriter of Greek extraction
- Tula Contostavlos, Tula Paulinea Contostavlos, a.k.a. "Tulisa" (born 1988), British singer-songwriter of Greek and Irish extraction
