= Come with Me (Dappy song) =

"Come With Me"

Song by Dappy and Margs vs. Dawood and Retro

from the album Bad Intentions
- Recorded: May 2012: Toronto, Canada
- Genre: Aggrotech
- Length: 3:34
- Label: Takeover Entertainment Limited
- Songwriter(s): Costadinos Contostavlos, Nargs, David Dawood, Nathan Retro
- Producer(s): David Dawood & Nathan Retro

Music video
- "Come With Me" on YouTube

"Come With Me" is a collaborative song by British record artist Dappy, upcoming MC Margs and music producers David Dawood and Nathan Retro, known for producing the Roll Deep hit song "Good Times". The song was written by all four artists in different global locations, between December 2011 and May 2012. "Come With Me" was originally to be released as the third official single from Dappy's debut solo studio album, Bad Intentions on 12 August 2012 as a digital download via the iTunes Store, however the single was removed from iTunes for unknown reasons. The song received its premiere when Dappy performed the song live at the Radio 1's Big Weekend in London on 23 June 2012.

== Writing and production ==
"Come With Me" was written by singer-songwriter and rapper Costadinos Contostavlos (Dappy), and co-produced by record producers David Dawood (Dawood) and Nathan Retro (Retro). According to Dawood and Retro, the vocals for the song were recorded in China, Russia and Italy over a six-month period, prior to the single's release on 12 August 2012. They also stated that the track was initially intended as a left-over track for use in the future. They said:

"The song Come With Me, totally addictive [...] mixing Aggrotech with rap and some other part of electronics. We took the vocals and tried it on Come With Me and it worked. Quite bright and catchy [...] it's kind of No-Fi, smoothing up one vocal and turning it into an electrifying dance track."

— David Dawood & Nathan Retro

"Come With Me" marks Dappy's fourth single away from N-Dubz, and follows his collaboration with Brian May on "Rockstar", which peaked at No. 2 in February 2012.

== Music video ==
The music video to accompany the release of "Come With Me" commenced filming in July 2012. A snippet of the video premièred on 27 July 2012 on T4 Music, however after the single release was cancelled the video was never released.

== Track listing ==
Digital download
No.	Title	Length
1.	"Come With Me" (Radio Edit)	3:34
2.	"Come With Me" (Agent X Remix)	5:22
3.	"Come With Me" (Supasound Remix)	4:17
4.	"Come With Me" (S-X Remix)	3:51
Total length:		17:04

Promotional CD single
No.	Title	Length
1.	"Come With Me" (Radio Edit)	3:34
2.	"Come With Me" (Extended Mix)	4:48
Total length:		8:22

== Credits and personnel ==
Recording

- Recorded in Beijing, China; Moscow, Russia; Milan, Italy

Personnel

- Lead vocals – Costadinos Contostavlos
- Producers – David Dawood and Nathan Retro
- Lyrics – Costadinos Contostavlos
- Sound designer – Nathan Retro
- Audio Engineer – David Dawood
- Composer – Costadinos Contostavlos
- Mixing engineer – Nathan Retro
- Mastering engineer – Nathan Retro
- Re-recording mixer – Nathan Retro
- Label: Takeover Entertainment Limited
