= Bad Intentions (album) =

Studio album by Dappy
- Released: 22 October 2012
- Recorded: 2011–12
- Studio: Real World Studios – Box, Wiltshire; The Farm – Guildford, Surrey
- Genre: Hip hop; grime; R&B
- Length: 49:01
- Label: Takeover; Island
- Producer: Costadinos "Dappy" Constostavlos (exec.); TMS; Fraser T Smith; Nathan Retro; David Dawood; Steve Mac; Wayne Hector; Alfred Millar; S-X

Dappy chronology
Bad Intentions (2012)	Fortune (2021)

Singles from Bad Intentions
- 1. "No Regrets" Released: 18 September 2011; 2. "Rockstar" Released: 23 February 2012; 3. "Good Intentions" Released: 16 September 2012; 4. "I.O.U" Released: 6 February 2013

Bad Intentions is the debut solo studio album from British rapper, singer, and songwriter Dappy, released on 22 October 2012 via Takeover Entertainment Limited and Island Records. The album is Dappy's first studio material released since the split of his previous hip-hop band, N-Dubz. The release of the album was announced in July 2011. On 3 July 2012, the album was confirmed for release on 1 October, however, the album was later pushed back two weeks to 15 October before eventually being released on 22 October. Bad Intentions includes guest appearances from English musician Brian May, English-Irish boy band The Wanted and upcoming British rapper Margs. The album produced two singles before the release, the lead single "No Regrets" which entered at number 1 on the UK Singles Chart, "Rockstar" featuring Brian May which attained similar success and "Good Intentions". The fourth single "Yin Yang" failed to peak within the top 40.

The album debuted at number 6 on the UK Albums Chart, number 12 on the Scottish Albums Chart and number 34 on the Irish Albums Chart while receiving mixed to negative reviews from critics.

== Background ==
After N-Dubz decided to take an indefinite break to begin work on solo projects, following their departure from American record label Def Jam, it was revealed that Dappy intended to pursue a solo career. He commented in an interview, "I want to do the unexpected and I want to break barriers." In the same interview, he insisted that he "wished to push his music style and motives in alternative directions." His first solo effort was a collaboration with fellow rapper Tinchy Stryder, on the lead single from his fourth studio album, Full Tank, entitled "Spaceship". He later revealed his debut solo single, "No Regrets", and announced that his debut solo record would be entitled Bad Intentions. Shortly after the announcement, "Rockstar" was later revealed as the album's second single. Concurrently, at the time of the recording, Dappy recorded a cover of Queen's "We Will Rock You", entitled "Rock You", which appears on the deluxe edition of the album in the form of a Radio 1 Live Lounge performance. Both tracks feature instrumental performances from Brian May. In a press interview in April 2012, Dappy revealed that the album's third single was set to be called "Dare to Dream". The track was not released, and does not appear on the album, and it remains unknown whether the track was re-titled or removed from the album completely.

== Singles ==
"No Regrets" was released as the album's lead single on 18 September 2011, peaking at #1 on the UK Singles Chart and #8 in Ireland. Dappy's N-Dubz bandmate, Fazer, makes a cameo appearance in the music video for the track, playing the piano in the bridge section. The track was originally recorded by N-Dubz, during recording sessions in America for their debut American release, but remained unreleased until Dappy released it as a solo track in September 2011. "Rockstar", a collaboration with Queen guitarist Brian May, was released as the album's second single on 26 February 2012. It peaked at #2 on the UK Singles Chart, being held off the top spot by Gotye's "Somebody That I Used to Know" featuring Kimbra. The track was written and recorded as a solo piece, and the collaboration with Brian May did not occur until several months later, when the guitarist favoured Dappy's material.

The third single, "Good Intentions", was released on 16 September 2012. The release of the track was first confirmed by Dappy at T4 on the Beach. The track premiered on BBC Radio 1 Xtra on 8 August. A music video for the track was filmed in Hawaii during July 2012. Dappy said of the single, "Hope you like it guys... Something a little different for ya... Just speaking from the heart...". The single peaked at number 12 on the UK Singles Chart, becoming Dappy's first single to chart outside the top 10. "Yin Yang" was to be released as the album's fourth single on 10 December 2012. The music video for the track premiered on 14 October. The track premiered on BBC Radio 1 Xtra on 10 October. Similarly to "Good Intentions", the music video for the track was filmed in Hawaii during July 2012. It failed to chart within the top 40 of the UK Singles Chart and peaked at number 73, becoming the album's and Dappy's least-successful single. It was later replaced as the fourth single by 'I.O.U', which was released on 6 February 2013.

=== Other songs ===
"I'm Coming (Tarzan Part 2)" was released as a promotional single on 3 July 2012. A music video was also filmed for the track, which also debuted on 3 July. The track peaked at #35 on the UK Singles Chart after a week of sales. The track was deemed controversial for its derogatory take on pop culture.

"Come with Me" with Margs, Dawood and Retro was originally to be released as the third single on 12 August 2012, however "Good Intentions" was released instead. To this date the video remains unreleased and the single was removed from purchase just days after release, and only charted at number 101 on the UK Singles Chart.

== Critical reception ==
Professional ratings
Review scores
Source	Rating
Digital Spy	2/5 stars
musicOMH	1/5 stars
Metro	1/5 stars
The Independent	3/5 stars
The Times	2/5 stars
The Upcoming	2/5 stars
Virgin Media	2/5 stars

Bad Intentions received mainly negative reviews from contemporary music critics. Lewis Corner of Digital Spy felt that the two lead singles "have already proven themselves radio-friendly anthems. Big strings, ear-snagging choruses and the occasional bit of witty wordplay makes them the most listenable of the set", however "the bulk of Bad Intentions fails to appeal", rating the album 2 out of 5 stars. musicOMH's Tim Lee believed that the album "doesn't lack bravado" and compared Dappy's album to The Marshall Mathers LP by Eminem, saying that "Dappy would love Bad Intentions to be considered in a similar vein [to The Marshall Mathers LP]" but "it misses out on replicating anything good from it" and "lacks wit, inventiveness and even the decency to stick to its cause". British newspaper Metro rated Bad Intentions 1 out of 5 stars, saying: "an inventory of violent sexism, hilariously inept arrhythmic rapping and r’n’b 'skits' that make Chris Moyles sound like Oscar Wilde", demeaning its "constant sexual braggadocio". Andy Gill of The Independent viewed the album's content as mostly angry: "He constantly boils over into splenetic, scattershot anger. Even the album's most heartfelt ballad, "Good Intentions", seethes with righteous anger". Rahul Bahal of The Upcoming credits Dappy's flow and delivery, that have a "unique quality" and are of "a decent standard", but criticises the album's production and themes: "The problem with the album remains its ties to N-Dubz, who Dappy has failed to escape. It seems he has made no progression beyond what he did with his group, except for talking about himself more", giving the album 2 out of 5 stars. Ian Gittins of Virgin Media compared Dappy to American rapper Eminem due to the album's comedic themes: "This lack of gravitas bedevils this utterly generic, predictable, dreary record. Congratulations to Dappy: he's unwittingly made the comedy record of the year."

== Commercial performance ==
Upon release Bad Intentions entered the UK Albums Chart at number six. The following week it dropped thirty-three places down to number 39, spending a total of four weeks within the top 100. The album entered at number 8 on the UK Download Chart and number 1 on the UK R&B Chart. The album entered the Irish Albums Chart at number 34, remaining on the chart for one week. On the Scottish Albums Chart, Bad Intentions entered at number 12.

== Track listing ==
- The album's track listing was confirmed by HMV on 3 July 2012, however, on 17 August, the track listing was revised. On 26 September, the album's track listing was confirmed via iTunes with the length of each track being revealed. The iTunes edition also includes three bonus music videos.

Standard Edition
No.	Title	Writer(s)	Producer(s)	Length
1.	"Intro (Me)"	Costadinos Contostavlos	Alfred Millar	3:27
2.	"Rockstar" (featuring Brian May)	Contostavlos; Ayak Thiik; Thomas Barnes; Benjamin Kohn; Peter Kelleher	TMS	3:38
3.	"Fuck Them"	Contostavlos; Sam Gumbley	S-X	3:26
4.	"Come with Me" (featuring Dawood, Retro and Margs)	Contostavlos	David Dawood; Nathan Retro	3:34
5.	"Good Intentions"	Contostavlos; Wayne Hector; Fraser T Smith; Clinton Outten; Miller; Tim Powell	Smith	3:48
6.	"Gino Skit"	Contostavlos		2:34
7.	"Tarzan"	Contostavlos	Nathan Retro	3:01
8.	"No Regrets"	Contostavlos; Ayak Thiik; Thomas Barnes; Kohn; Peter Kelleher	TMS	4:00
9.	"I'm Coming (Tarzan Part 2)"	Contostavlos; Sam Gumbley	S-X	4:12
10.	"Yin Yang"	Contostavlos; Thiik; Nathan Retro	Retro	3:57
11.	"Bring It Home" (featuring The Wanted)	Contostavlos; Steve Mac; Wayne Hector; Nathan Sykes	Mac; Hector	3:46
12.	"All or Nothing"	Contostavlos	Smith	3:56
13.	"I.O.U."	Kyle	Burns	4:29
14.	"Outro (You)"	Contostavlos	Millar	1:13
Total length:				49:01

Limited High Grade Edition bonus disc
No.	Title	Writer(s)	Producer(s)	Length
1.	"Who's the Daddy" (with Benny Banks)	Contostavlos; Benny Banks	Show 'N' Prove	3:26
2.	"Explode" (featuring Cover Drive)	Contostavlos; Karen Reifer; Thomas Ray Armstrong; Jamar Harding; Barry Hill; Mac	Mac	3:25
3.	"We Will Rock You" (Radio 1 Live Lounge performance)	Contostavlos; Thiik; Barnes; Kohn; Kelleher; Brian May	TMS	3:06
4.	"Rockstar" (Radio 1 Live Lounge performance)	Contostavlos; Thiik; Barnes; Kohn; Kelleher	TMS	3:38
5.	"No Regrets" (Acoustic mix)	Contostavlos; Thiik; Barnes; Kohn; Kelleher	TMS	3:49
6.	"Spaceship" (featuring Tinchy Stryder)	Contostavlos; Kwasi Danquah III; Barnes; Kohn; Kelleher Heidi Burns	TMS	3:33
7.	"Spaceship" (featuring Tinchy Stryder) (Acoustic)	Contostavlos; Danquah III; Barnes; Kohn; Kelleher	TMS	3:33
Total length:				17:31

iTunes bonus videos
No.	Title	Director(s)	Length
21.	"No Regrets" (music video)	Benny Boom	4:12
22.	"Rockstar" (music video)	Colin Tilley	3:43
23.	"Good Intentions" (music video)	Tilley	4:12

== Chart performance ==
Chart (2012)	Peak position
Irish Albums Chart	34
Scottish Albums Chart	12
UK Albums Chart	6

== Certifications ==
Certifications for Bad Intentions
Region	Certification	Certified units/sales
United Kingdom (BPI)	Gold	100,000^{‡}
^{‡} Sales+streaming figures based on certification alone.

== Release history ==
Regions	Dates	Format(s)	Label(s)
Ireland	19 October 2012	CD; digital download	Takeover Entertainment; Island Records
United Kingdom	22 October 2012	High Grade Edition CD; digital download	Takeover Entertainment; Island Records
