= I'm Coming =

I'm Coming may refer to:

- "I'm Coming" (Rain song), 2006
- "I'm Coming" (Tove Lo song), 2020
- "I'm Coming (Tarzan Part 2)", a 2012 song by Dappy
- I'm Coming, a 1996 album by Szhirley

== See also ==
- "Ich komme" (German "I'm coming"), a 2025 song by Finnish singer Erika Vikman
