= List of 1Xtra Chart number ones =

This is a list of the number ones of the 1Xtra Chart.

- List of 1Xtra Chart number-one singles of the 2000s
- List of 1Xtra Chart number-one singles of the 2010s

== See also ==
- Lists of UK R&B Singles Chart number ones
