= Mortola =

Mortola may refer to:

- Mortola Inferiore, frazione of Ventimiglia comune, in Liguria, Italy; also known as La Mortola
- Mortola Superiore, frazione of Ventimiglia comune in Liguria, Italy
- Mortola mortola, monotypic genus of ammotrechid camel spiders
- Edward J. Mortola (1917–2002), American educator, Pace University president
- Mortola, character in 2003 Inkworld trilogy by Cornelia Funke

== See also ==
- Motorola (disambiguation)
