= 1Xtra Chart =

UK discontinued weekly record chart

The 1Xtra Chart is a discontinued weekly record chart based on sales of singles in the United Kingdom. It listed the 40 biggest-selling urban music songs released within a three-month time period, and featured genres such as hip hop, R&B, dancehall and rap. The chart was compiled by the Official Charts Company (OCC) on behalf of the UK music industry, and each week's new number one was announced on The 1Xtra Chart at 1 p.m. on Saturdays on BBC Radio 1Xtra. Adele Roberts took over from Sarah-Jane Crawford in spring 2012, and it had been hosted by Ronnie Herel until December 2010. The chart was also listed on the official websites of both BBC Radio 1 and the OCC.

The 1Xtra Chart was launched during October 2007. Its first number one was "Valerie" by Mark Ronson featuring Amy Winehouse.

== See also ==
- List of 1Xtra Chart number ones
- UK R&B Chart
- UK Singles Chart
