= Good Intentions (Dappy song) =

Single by Dappy

from the album Bad Intentions
- Released: 16 September 2012
- Genre: Contemporary R&B
- Length: 3:49
- Label: Takeover Entertainment Limited
- Songwriter(s): Costadinos Contostavlos, Wayne Hector, Fraser T Smith, Clinton Outten, Alfred Millar, Tim Powell
- Producer(s): Fraser T Smith

Dappy singles chronology
"Explode" (2012)	"Good Intentions" (2012)	"I.O.U." (2013)

"Good Intentions" is the third official single to be released from British grime rapper Dappy's debut solo studio album, Bad Intentions. "Good Intentions" was released on 16 September 2012 as a digital download on the iTunes Store. The single was written by Dappy, and produced by Fraser T Smith. The single received its première when Dappy performed the song live at T4 on the Beach on 1 July 2012. The track later premièred on radio on 29 July 2012.

== Background ==
The release of "Good Intentions" was confirmed by Dappy at T4 on the Beach. The song premièred on BBC Radio 1 Xtra on 29 July 2012. Dappy said of the song, that it is a little different from his previous released songs, and that in the song, he is speaking from the heart.

== Music video ==
The music video for the song "Good Intentions" was filmed at the beginning of August 2012 in Hawaii, and was directed by Colin Tilley. The music video was released on 24 August.

== Track listing ==
Digital download
No.	Title	Length
1.	"Good Intentions"	3:49
2.	"Good Intentions" (Major Look Remix)	4:23
3.	"Good Intentions" (Major Look Dub Mix)	4:01
4.	"Good Intentions" (Zone 10 Remix)	3:41

== Credits and personnel ==
Personnel

- Lead vocals – Costadinos Contostavlos
- Producer – Fraser T Smith
- Lyrics – Costadinos Contostavlos
- Composer – Costadinos Contostavlos
- Label: Takeover Entertainment Limited

== Charts ==
Chart (2012)	Peak position
Ireland (IRMA)	24
UK Singles (OCC)	12

== Certifications ==
Region	Certification	Certified units/sales
United Kingdom (BPI)	Silver	200,000^{‡}
^{‡} Sales+streaming figures based on certification alone.

== Release history ==
Region	Date	Format	Label
United Kingdom	16 September 2012	Digital Download	All Around the World Productions, Universal Music Group
Worldwide	7 October 2012	Digital Download	Takeover Entertainment Private Limited Company
