= Star in the Hood (company) =

International clothing company based in Norwich, England

Star in the Hood Unltd. (S.I.T.H)
- Type: Private Unlimited Company
- Industry: Fashion
- Headquarters: Norwich, United Kingdom
- Area served: East Asia
- Products: Clothing; Accessories; Luxury goods
- Owner: Takeover Group Macau
- Parent: Takeover Group
- Divisions: MIGI Clothing
- Website: www.starinthehood.net/

Star in the Hood Unltd. (or S.I.T.H) is an international mid-range to luxury clothing company founded by music managers Archie Lamb and Jack Foster. The company is named after Tinchy Stryder's pseudonym Star in the Hood from 2006. Star in the Hood specializes in men's, and women's lifestyle streetwear and accessories, stocked at JD Sports in 155 stores in the United Kingdom, also in Europe, and Southeast Asia. The items are produced in very limited quantities.

== History ==
In 2010, Star in the Hood entered a partnership with JD Sports. Following the brand partnering with JD Sports and Danquah's business deal with Roc Nation LLC in June 2010, Danquah and Shawn "Jay-Z" Carter were in talks on how best to expand the brand further. In September 2011, Star in the Hood created the hip-hop fashion brand MIGI Clothing.

In December 2011, Star in the Hood began its steps to creating its flagship stores in Asia. In May 2012, Star in the Hood began its steps to expand its range and start creating suits, dress shoes, footwear, lingerie, and undergarments.

== Design ==
The clothing is designed with input from tailors, fashion designers, and Danquah. Star in the Hood has also collaborated with many other famous brands, such as Nike, G-Shock, and Apple Inc, and collaborated and worn by musicians and people such as Rihanna, Alexis Jordan, Emily Deyn (Sister of Agyness Deyn), Frankie Sandford, Tinie Tempah, Jodie Connor, and Maria Falbo (Female Professional skateboarder).
