= Takeover Entertainment =

British entertainment company

Takeover Entertainment Ltd.
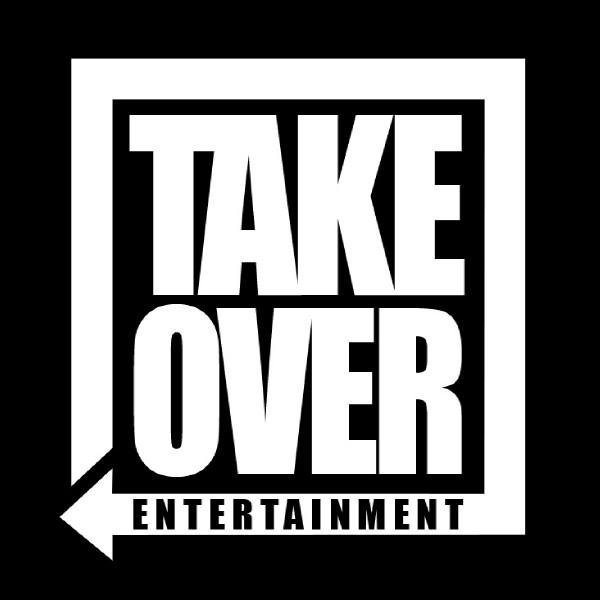
- Type: Private ownership, Private limited company
- Industry: Music industry & Fashion
- Genre: Hip hop, alternative hip hop, alternative rock, R&B, soul, neo soul, electronic, post-dubstep, dubstep, grime
- Founded: 9 February 2006
- Founder: Archie Lamb & Jack Foster
- Defunct: 22 October 2013
- Fate: Dissolved 2013
- Headquarters: 64 New Cavendish Street; London; United Kingdom; W1G 8TB
- Area served: United Kingdom
- Key people: Kwasi Danquah III (Chairman and A&R executive); Archie Lamb (President and CEO); Jack Foster (Vice President, COO and CFO)
- Products: Entertainment
- Divisions: Star in the Hood
- Subsidiaries: Takeover/Cloud 9 Takeover Roc Nation

Takeover Entertainment was a British entertainment company. The organization operated an independent record label, talent agency, a music production company, as well as its own music publishing house. The company was founded in 2006 and was run by Kwasi Danquah III (known by his pseudonym Tinchy Stryder), Archie Lamb and Jack Foster. It specialized in producing R&B, hip hop and electronic music. It was dissolved in October 2013

The first person to be signed to Takeover Entertainment was English rapper and entrepreneur Tinchy Stryder. Success followed by Stryder becoming the biggest selling UK male artist of 2009 with his second studio album, Catch 22, which spawned hits, including "Take Me Back", and #1's "Never Leave You", and the N-Dubz collaboration "Number 1".

== History ==
The company was formed on Thursday 9 February 2006 by Archie Lamb and Jack Foster. Then part-time promoters, the duo put on nightclubs in the United Kingdom that featured artists including Roll Deep and Lethal Bizzle. Upon meeting Danquah in 2006 they branched out into management, and signed him to a record deal. The Star in the Hood clothing company was founded in the same year.

In 2008 Takeover Entertainment, signed a joint venture with EMI Music Publishing to create the global music publishing company Takeover/Cloud 9, and enabled Takeover Entertainment to sign artists and songwriters and develop the signed artists and songwriters in partnership with EMI.

In 2010 Shawn "Jay-Z" Carter and Roc Nation signed a joint venture deal with Takeover Entertainment to create a European record label and entertainment company. The new company was named Takeover Roc Nation. Takeover Roc Nation is currently based in the United Kingdom, and distributes its record releases through Sony Music and partners with Live Nation for all other aspects of the business.

== People ==
Act	Year signed	Role	Reference
Agent X	2012	Audio engineer, DJ, mixing or mastering engineer, producer, songwriter	
Ayak Thiik	2010	Songwriter	
Dappy	2011-2012	Signed artist	
David Dawood	2010	Audio engineer, DJ, producer, songwriter	
Dot Rotten	2011	Managed artist	
Dirty Danger	2011	Audio engineer, producer	
Jodie Connor	2010	Signed artist, songwriter	
Giggs	2010	Managed artist	
Nathan Retro	2010	DJ, mixing or mastering engineer, producer, songwriter	
Ria Ritchie	2011	Signed artist	
Ruff Sqwad	2011	Signed artist	
DJ Sir Spyro	2011	DJ	
Prince Rapid	2011	Mixing or mastering engineer, producer	

== Concerts and tours ==
- Rollercoaster Tour, November 2011 (United Kingdom)
- The Rockstar Tour, December 2011 (United Kingdom)
- Bad Intentions Tour, 2012

== Discography ==
=== 2011 Studio album single(s) ===
Information
Jodie Connor - "Now or Never"
- Released: Thursday 13 January 2011
- Album: TBA
- UK Singles Chart position: 14
Tinchy Stryder - "Let It Rain"
- Released: Thursday 27 January 2011
- Album: Third Strike
- UK Singles Chart position: 14
Jodie Connor - "Bring It"
- Released: Sunday 20 February 2011
- Album: TBA
- UK Singles Chart position: 37
Tinchy Stryder - "Spaceship"
- Released: Sunday 12 June 2011
- Album: Full Tank
- UK Singles Chart position: 5
Dappy - "No Regrets"
- Released: Sunday 18 September 2011
- Album: Bad Intentions
- UK Singles Chart position: 1
Tinchy Stryder - "Off The Record"
- Released: Sunday 6 November 2011
- Album: Full Tank
- UK Singles Chart position: 24

=== 2012 Studio album single(s) ===
Information
Dappy - "Rockstar"
- Released: Sunday 26 February 2012
- Album: Bad Intentions
- UK Singles Chart position: 2
Tinchy Stryder - "Bright Lights"
- Released: Friday 2 March 2012
- Album: Full Tank
- UK Singles Chart position: 7
Jodie Connor - "Take You There"
- Released: Sunday 29 July 2012
- Album: TBA
Dappy - "Come with Me"
- Released: Sunday 12 August 2012
- Album: Bad Intentions
Dappy - "Good Intentions"
- Released: Sunday 16 September 2012 – Sunday 7 October 2012
- Album: Bad Intentions
- Record chart position: 12
Tinchy Stryder - "Help Me"
- Released: Sunday 30 September 2012
- Album: Full Tank
- Record chart position: TBR

=== Studio album(s) ===
Information
Dappy - "Bad Intentions"
- Released: Monday 22 October 2012
- Album: Bad Intentions
