= Oh My (Dappy song) =

2018 song by Dappy featuring Ay Em

Single by Dappy featuring Ay Em
- Released: 17 May 2018
- Genre: Hip hop
- Length: 4:08
- Label: Polydor
- Songwriter(s): Costadinos Contostavlos; Ali Magby Ahmed; Daniel George Caruana; Jonathan Lee; Alfred Millar

Dappy singles chronology
"Trill" (2017)	"Oh My" (2018)	"All We Know" (2018)

Music video
- "Oh My" on YouTube

"Oh My" is a song by English singer Dappy. The song features Ay Em. Polydor Records released it on 17 May 2018 as a single.

== Music video ==
The song was supported by a music video.

== Charts ==
Chart (2018)	Peak position
Ireland (IRMA)	94
UK Singles (OCC)	23

== Certifications ==
Region	Certification	Certified units/sales
United Kingdom (BPI)	Platinum	600,000^{‡}
^{‡} Sales+streaming figures based on certification alone.
