= Motorrolla (band) =

Ukrainian rock band from Khmelnytskyi

Motor’rolla
- Origin: Khmelnytskyi, Ukraine
- Genres: Rock
- Years active: 1994–present
- Members: Serhii "Senia" Prysiazhnyi – vocals, guitar; Ihor Lysyi – bass guitar, vocals; Serhii Kostiuk – guitar; Yaroslav Vilchyk – drums; Viktor Tsukanov – sound engineering; Bohdan Hlovatskyi – manager
- Past members: Oleksandr Budnetskyi – vocals; Illia Demba – saxophone; Andrii Zakharko – bass guitar, scratch machine; Viktor Verkhniaцьkyi – bass guitar; Kostiantyn Streletskyi – drums; Yevhen Tymoshenko – bass guitar; Serhii Lebid – drums; Oleksandr Kyryliuk – drums; Serhii Palagin – vocals; Roman Furmanchuk – keyboards; Oleh Burbela – guitar; Serhii Karnaukh – keyboards, accordion; Viktor Shchur – keyboards, accordion

Motor’rolla (Мотор'ролла) is a Ukrainian rock band from Khmelnytskyi, formed in 1994 by six members: Oleksandr Budnetskyi, Ihor Lysyi, Serhii Prysiazhnyi, Viktor Verkhniaцьkyi, Kostiantyn Streletskyi, and Illia Demba. The band's name combines the words "motorcycles" and "rock’n’roll". Over its career the group has released several studio albums, including Zabavy patriotiv (1996), Tysk (1999), …sho komu ne iasno? (2005), Koliourovi sny (2008) and Dva kroky do vesny (2015).

== History ==
=== 1990–1994: Formation ===
According to retrospective accounts of the band, the initial line‑up formed in Khmelnytskyi in the early 1990s and played their first official concert on 11 May 1994, a date they later marked as the group's birthday. In interviews, frontman Serhii Prysiazhnyi has recalled that the original name "Piractum Est" was soon abandoned in favour of "Motor’rolla", which better reflected their energetic rock style.

=== 1995–2005: Early career, Zabavy patriotiv and Tysk ===
Through the mid‑1990s Motor’rolla gained prominence via appearances at Ukrainian rock festivals such as Chervona Ruta and other regional competitions, moving beyond their local Khmelnytskyi audience. Their debut album Zabavy patriotiv ("Patriots’ Fun") appeared in 1996, followed by Tysk ("Pressure") in 1999, establishing them as part of Ukraine's post‑Soviet rock wave.

Line‑up changes during this period eventually led guitarist Serhii "Senia" Prysiazhnyi to take over as lead vocalist after the departure of original singer Oleksandr Budnetskyi around 2000.

=== 2005–2007: …sho komu ne iasno? ===
In 2005 the band released their third studio album …sho komu ne iasno? ("…what’s not clear to whom?"). The single "8-y kolir" ("The 8th Colour") became their breakthrough hit, receiving heavy rotation on Ukrainian music channels and gaining them a broader mainstream audience.

Around this time Motor’rolla frequently shared stages with other Ukrainian rock acts and appeared at major festivals, contributing to the consolidation of a new Ukrainian‑language rock scene.

=== 2008–2014: Koliourovi sny and The best of Motor’rolla ===
The 2008 album Koliourovi sny ("Colourful Dreams") continued the band's melodic rock direction and yielded several radio singles and music videos. In 2009 Motor’rolla released a CD/DVD compilation The best of Motor’rolla and supported it with a nationwide tour.

Their festival schedule during this era included performances at events such as Krayina Mrii and other open‑air rock gatherings, where they appeared alongside bands like VV, Boombox and Tartak.

=== 2014–2016: Dva kroky do vesny ===
In 2014–2015 Motor’rolla recorded and released the album Dva kroky do vesny ("Two Steps to Spring"), preceded by singles including "Tse ty" ("It’s You") and "Kartyna" ("The Painting"). Prysiazhnyi has described the record as their most mature work, noting that its "two steps to spring" metaphor refers to internal changes rather than a specific season.

The group supported the album with concerts across Ukraine, including performances near the front line during the war in Donbas.

=== 2016–present: later work ===
From 2016 onward Motor’rolla released a series of singles, including "LOVE", "Liniia" and "Nadykhai", which continued their melodic rock style while incorporating more contemporary production. The band's later festival appearances have included MRPL City in Mariupol, and they have continued to perform club shows across Ukraine.

In the early 2020s Motor’rolla prepared material for a new album titled My ne vtomylys, syly my maiemo ("We Are Not Tired, We Have Strength"), which they presented on the military radio station Army FM in 2025.

== Band members ==
=== Current members ===
- Serhii "Senia" Prysiazhnyi – vocals, guitar
- Ihor Lysyi – bass guitar, vocals
- Serhii Kostiuk – guitar
- Yaroslav Vilchyk – drums
- Viktor Tsukanov – sound engineering
- Bohdan Hlovatskyi – manager

== Discography ==
=== Selected studio albums ===
- Zabavy patriotiv (1996)
- Tysk (1999)
- …sho komu ne iasno? (2005)
- Koliourovi sny (2008)
- Dva kroky do vesny (2015)
- My ne vtomylys, syly my maiemo (2024)

=== Selected singles ===
- "8-y kolir" (2005)
- "LOVE" (2016)
- "Nadykhai" (2018)

== Music videos ==
Motor’rolla have released numerous music videos since the 1990s, including clips for "8-y kolir", "Do tebe, myla", "Moia voda", "LOVE" and "Nadykhai", which have appeared on Ukrainian music television and online platforms.
