= Spaceship (Tinchy Stryder and Dappy song) =

Single by Tinchy Stryder and Dappy
- B-side: "Oh No"
- Released: 12 June 2011
- Recorded: 2011
- Genre: Electronic; hip hop; R&B
- Length: 3:33
- Label: Takeover Entertainment
- Composer(s): Kwasi Danquah III
- Lyricist(s): Dino Contostavlos; TMS
- Producer(s): TMS

Tinchy Stryder singles chronology
"Bring It" (2011)	"Spaceship" (2011)	"Off the Record" (2011)

Dappy singles chronology
"Number 1" (2009)	"Spaceship" (2011)	"No Regrets" (2011)

Music video
- "Spaceship" on YouTube

"Spaceship" is a song by rapper Tinchy Stryder and hip hop vocalist Dappy. It was meant to be the first single released from his fourth studio album entitled, Full Tank but Full Tank was scrapped making it a non-album single. It was released on 12 June 2011 as a digital download. The single features vocals from Rapper/singer Dappy of N-Dubz, as well as uncredited back up vocals from Tulisa Contostavlos, also from N-Dubz. This is Tinchy Stryder's first top five single since 2009.

== Critical reception ==
Lewis Corner of Digital Spy gave the song three stars out of five, stating that Stryder "and the Grime music trio's frontman/serial "Dappy hat's" offender Dappy split rhymes that reminisce on how far they've come in the biz [...] over a watery stew of club beats and pulsating synths that lack any real oomph or lyrical resonance. Not to worry, Tinch, there's always that rainy day fund, right?"

== Music video ==
The music video was filmed in Portofino, Liguria, North-Western Italy, by United Kingdom directors Kwasi Danquah III, Luke Monaghan & James Barber, to accompany the release of "Spaceship". British fashion model and 2010 Miss England finalist, Pascal Craymer, makes a cameo in the video. The video was premiered on Tinchy Stryder's YouTube channel on 25 April 2011 and reached 1 million views on 8 May 2011. The video has now reached nearly 6 million .

== Track listing ==
Digital single track listing
No.	Title	Length
1.	"Spaceship" (Album Version)	3:33
2.	"Spaceship" (7Th Heaven Clean Radio Edit)	4:05
3.	"Spaceship" (Club Junkies Radio Edit)	3:25
4.	"Oh No"	3:29
Total length:		14:32

== Chart performance ==
=== Weekly charts ===
Weekly chart performance for "Spaceship"
Chart (2011)	Peak position
Ireland (IRMA)	45
Scotland (OCC)	5
UK Singles (OCC)	5
UK Hip Hop/R&B (OCC)	1

=== Year-end charts ===
Year-end chart performance for "Spaceship"
Chart (2011)	Position
UK Singles (Official Charts Company)	141

== Release history ==
Release history and formats for "Spaceship"
Country	Date	Format	Label
Various	12 June 2011	Digital download	Takeover Entertainment Limited; Universal Island
