= Rockstar (Dappy song) =

Single by Dappy featuring Brian May

from the album Bad Intentions
- Released: 26 February 2012
- Recorded: 2011
- Genre: Rap rock
- Length: 3:38
- Label: All Around the World; Takeover Entertainment
- Songwriter(s): Costadinos Contostavlos, Ayak Thiik, Thomas Barnes, Benjamin Kohn, Peter Kelleher
- Producer(s): TMS

Dappy singles chronology
"No Regrets" (2011)	"Rockstar" (2012)	"Explode" (2012)

Music video
- "Rockstar (feat. Brian May)" on YouTube

"Rockstar" is the second single from former N-Dubz lead rapper Dappy's debut studio album, Bad Intentions staying with the commercial pop template of his previous single, "No Regrets". It was released on 23 February 2012. The song also features Queen guitarist Brian May.

== Music video ==
A music video to accompany the release of "Rockstar" was first released onto YouTube on 18 January 2012 at a total length of three minutes and forty-eight seconds. It was directed by Colin Tilley. The video has received 16.5 million views on YouTube.

== Critical reception ==
Lewis Corner of Digital Spy gave the song a very positive review stating:

Fortunately, Dappy hasn't wandered too far away from what made his first cut so successful. Head-bopping beats and lyrical word play detail the star's turbulent relationship with the press ("If the Guardian's my angel, why's The Sun burning holes in me?"). But what sets this apart from his previous effort is May's rumbling guitar riffs which culminate in an electrifying solo at the end. Given it's something few can resist, we're confident this will be another bona fide smash..

== Chart performance ==
"Rockstar" made its first chart appearance in the week ending 8 March 2012, where it debuted at number fifteen on the Irish Singles Chart - lower than predecessor "No Regrets" (#8, September 2011). The track then debuted at number two on the UK Singles Chart with first week sales of 57,415 copies for the week ending 10 March 2012. "Rockstar" also debuted at number-one on the R&B chart, dethroning Flo Rida and Sia's "Wild Ones".

== Track listing ==
Promotional CD single
No.	Title	Length
1.	"Rockstar" (Album Version) (featuring Brian May)	3:37
2.	"Rockstar" (Instrumental Version) (featuring Brian May)	3:37
Total length:		7:14

Digital download
No.	Title	Length
1.	"Rockstar" (Album Version) (featuring Brian May)	3:37
2.	"Rockstar" (Ferrari Remix) (featuring Ferrari)	3:30
3.	"Rockstar" (TMS Vocal Mix)	4:37
4.	"Rockstar" (TMS Dub Mix)	5:09
5.	"Rockstar" (Instrumental Version) (featuring Brian May)	3:37
Total length:		20:20

== Charts ==
=== Weekly charts ===
Chart (2012)	Peak position
Belgium (Ultratip Bubbling Under Flanders)	49
Ireland (IRMA)	15
Scotland (OCC)	3
Slovakia (Rádio Top 100)	87
UK Singles (OCC)	2
UK Hip Hop/R&B (OCC)	1

=== Year-end charts ===
Chart (2012)	Position
UK Singles (Official Charts Company)	157

== Certifications ==
Region	Certification	Certified units/sales
United Kingdom (BPI)	Silver	200,000^{‡}
^{‡} Sales+streaming figures based on certification alone.

== Release history ==
Region	Date	Format	Label
United Kingdom	26 February 2012	Digital download	All Around the World; Takeover Entertainment Ltd
