= Tony Fell =

English businessman and musician (1931–2011)

- Born: 27 December 1931
- Died: 6 December 2011 (aged 79)
- Occupations: businessman and musician

Robert Anthony "Tony" Fell (27 December 1931, Liverpool – 6 December 2011) was a British businessman and musician.

Fell worked for various firms, including ICI in the 1950s, becoming managing director of Hortors Printers from 1968–74, and managing director of Boosey & Hawkes Music Publishers 1974–96.

He founded the Johannesburg Bach Choir, which he conducted 1964–74. He was Chair of the Royal Philharmonic Society 1997–2005: the Society awarded him an Honorary Membership, which it rarely bestows, in 2011.
