= No Regrets (Dappy song) =

2011 single by Dappy

Single by Dappy

from the album Bad Intentions
- Released: 18 September 2011
- Recorded: 2011
- Genre: British hip hop, R&B
- Length: 3:49
- Label: All Around the World; Takeover Entertainment
- Songwriter(s): Costadinos Contostavlos, Ayak Thiik, Thomas Barnes, Benjamin Kohn, Peter Kelleher
- Producer(s): TMS

Dappy singles chronology
"Spaceship" (2011)	"No Regrets" (2011)	"Rockstar" (2012)

Music video
- "No Regrets" on YouTube

"No Regrets" is the debut solo single by British hip hop artist Dappy, taken as the lead single from his debut studio album, Bad Intentions. The song was produced by TMS and was written by Dappy, Ayak Thiik, and TMS. It was released in the United Kingdom on 18 September 2011.

The song peaked at number one on the UK Singles Chart. The song includes many pop culture references to films such as The King's Speech, Back to the Future and The Italian Job. The track was originally recorded by N-Dubz, as part of their planned debut album in the United States with Def Jam. After parting ways with the label, Dappy decided to rerecord the song as a solo artist. The N-Dubz version was later featured on the group's compilation album, Greatest Hits. The music video has received more than 35 million views on YouTube.

== Music video ==
The music video was filmed in Los Angeles by director Benny Boom. It was first released onto YouTube on 5 August 2011, at a total length of four minutes and fourteen seconds. The video is split into four scenes. It sees Dappy name checking celebs, fictional film characters and even royalty in a number of topical references, he then proceeds with rhymes that come thick and fast backed with an athemic chorus laced with the kind of meaning that a lot of people will be able to relate to. The first scene finds Dappy in a L.A. neighbourhood, showing two friends who have gotten into gang trouble and a troubled woman dealing with a breakdown of a marriage while also aspiring to be a Nurse Practitioner. The second scene finds Dappy in a boxing gym, where it shows a boxer training and preparing for a boxing world championship fight, before fellow N-Dubz bandmate Fazer makes a cameo appearance playing on the piano. The fourth and final scene builds up to Dappy concluding the video with a track key change alongside gospel choir backing singers on top of an L.A. skyscraper.

Screenshots from "No Regrets"

Dappy in the L.A. neighbourhood scene in the music video for "No Regrets".

Dappy in the scene alongside gospel choir backing singers on top of an L.A. skyscraper in the music video for "No Regrets".

== Critical reception ==
Lewis Corner of Digital Spy gave the song a positive review stating:

"This is my king's speech, I'm nowhere near the end," Dappy announces on the opening line, proceeding to name-check no less than eight celeb mates over electro-hip-hop beats and a stirring piano riff. The result is the Big Mac of songs; you know it's no good for you, but it's thoroughly enjoyable nonetheless, and combined with an impressive vocal showing, a gospel choir and that key change that could put an X Factor winner's single to shame, Dapz's dream of a number one hit seems closer than ever before..

== Track listing ==
Digital download
No.	Title	Length
1.	"No Regrets"	3:49
2.	"No Regrets" (True Tiger Remix)	3:59
3.	"No Regrets" (Craze & Hoax Remix)	4:16
4.	"No Regrets" (Nathan Retro Remix)	6:45
5.	"No Regrets" (Acoustic Version)	6:11
Total length:		24:42

== Charts and certifications ==
=== Charts ===
Chart (2011)	Peak position
Ireland (IRMA)	8
Scotland (OCC)	1
UK Singles (OCC)	1
UK Hip Hop/R&B (OCC)	1

=== Year-end charts ===
Chart (2011)	position
UK Singles (Official Charts Company)	64

=== Certifications ===
Region	Certification	Certified units/sales
United Kingdom (BPI)	Platinum	600,000^{‡}
^{‡} Sales+streaming figures based on certification alone.

== Release history ==
Region	Date	Format	Label
Ireland	18 September 2011	Digital download	All Around the World & Takeover Entertainment Ltd
United Kingdom	18 September 2011	Digital download	All Around the World & Takeover Entertainment Ltd
