= UK Hip Hop and R&B Singles and Albums Charts =

Hip hop and R&B British music charts

The UK Hip Hop and R&B Singles Chart and the UK Hip Hop and R&B Albums Chart (also known as The Official UK Hip Hop and R&B Charts, and previously the Top 40 Hip Hop and RnB Singles and the Top 40 Hip Hop and RnB Albums, and the UK Urban Chart) are 40-position R&B and hip hop music charts compiled by the Official Charts Company (OCC) on behalf of the music industry in the United Kingdom.

During October 1994 The Official Charts Company established a chart for R&B Albums and Singles. Although the charts do not receive any airplay, their compilation is viewed on the websites of the OCC and BBC Radio 1, as well as publications such as UKChartsPlus and Music Week. The UK R&B chart is also shown regularly on music channels including Kiss, Viva UK, MTV Base and MTV Hits. Additionally, the channels regularly use The Official UK R&B Download Chart, which is shown on 4Music.

The two charts are also compiled and shown on the BBC Radio 1 website. Criteria for inclusion in the chart is unclear, since it does not necessarily rely upon the positions of R&B and hip hop songs on the UK Singles Chart.

== Current number ones ==
Logo of the UK R&B Chart, as seen on BBC Radio 1.

== See also ==
- Lists of UK R&B Singles Chart number ones
- Lists of UK R&B Albums Chart number ones
- 1Xtra Chart
