= Dappy =

British rapper and singer (born 1987)

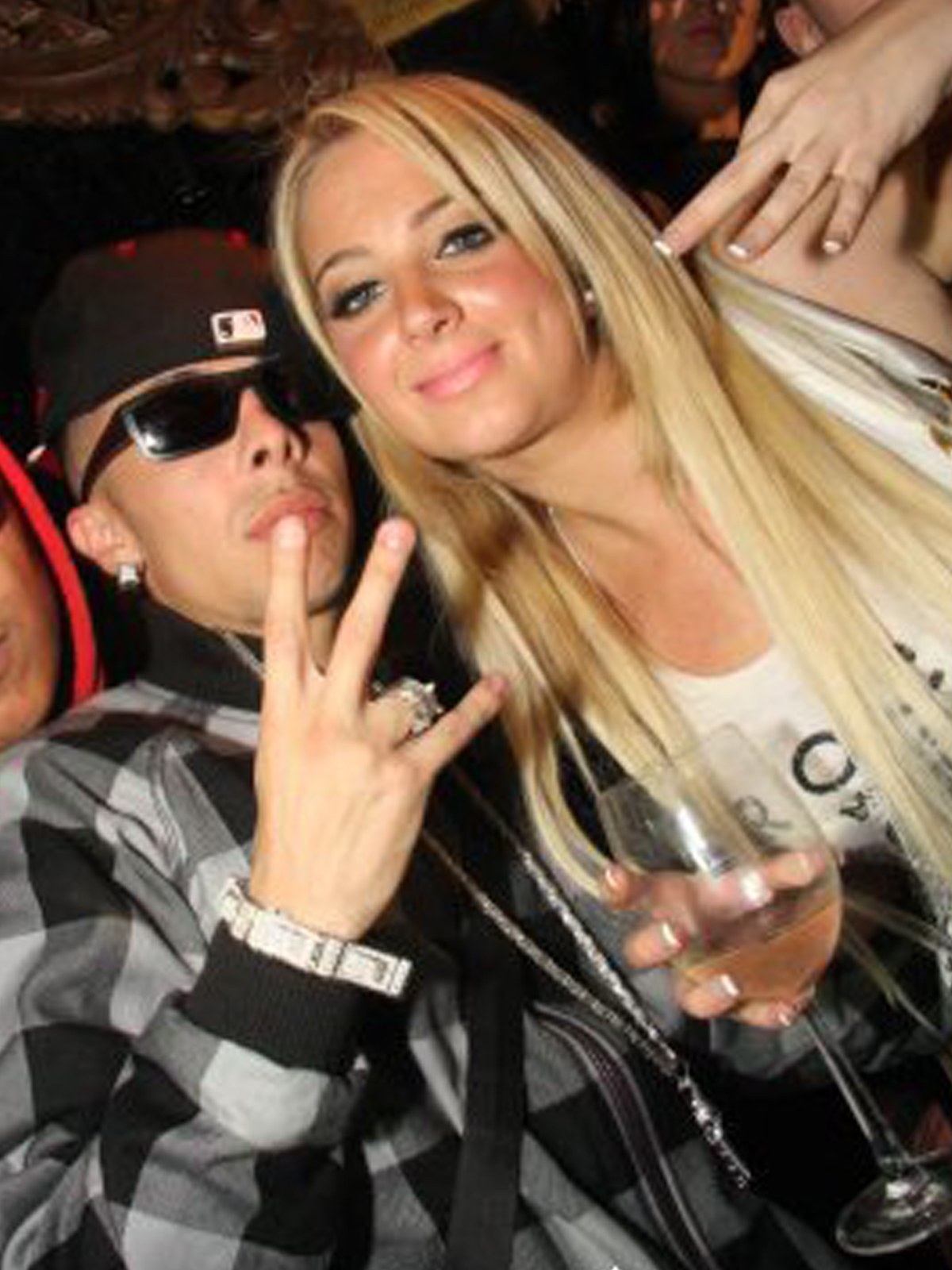
- Dappy and Tulisa Contostavlos, 2012

Background information
- Born: Costadinos Contostavlos; 11 June 1987 (age 39); London, England
- Genres: British hip-hop; grime; R&B
- Occupations: Rapper; singer; songwriter; record producer; actor
- Years active: 2000–present
- Labels: Polydor (2007–2008); AATW (2008–2015); Island (2009–2012); Takeover Ent (2012–2015); EMI (2023–present)
- Website: thedappy.com

Costadinos Contostavlos (Greek: Κωνσταντίνος Κοντόσταυλος; born 11 June 1987), better known by his stage name Dappy, is an English rapper, singer, songwriter and actor. He is the lead singer of the Camden-based hip-hop and grime trio N-Dubz, with his cousin Tulisa and Fazer. He was known for his love for what he describes as "eye-catching headwear". His trademark was wearing a selection of woolly chullos (sometimes referred to as "Dappy hats"), turning up one or both of the ear-flaps of the hat.

== Career ==
=== 2000–2011: N-Dubz era ===
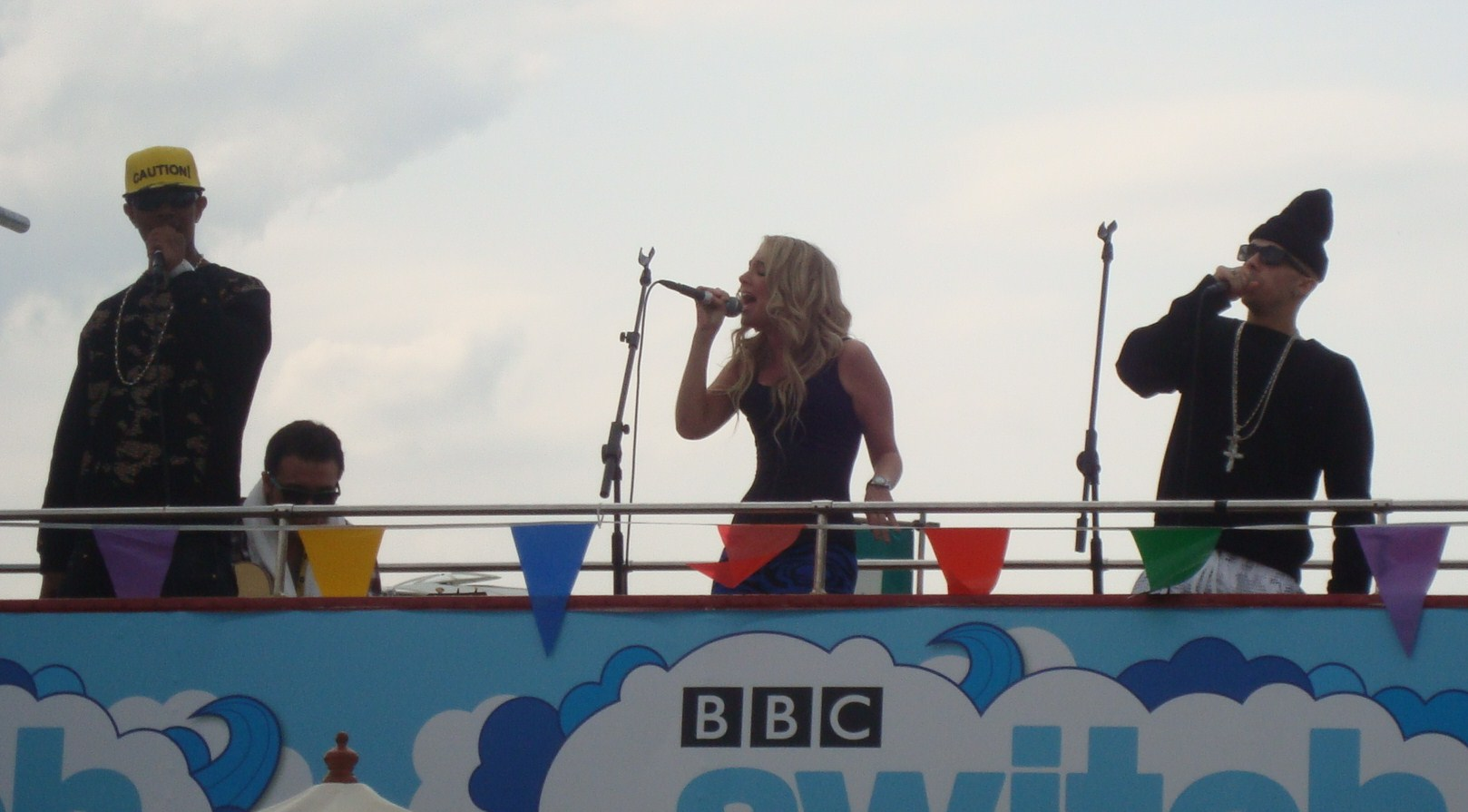
Dappy (right) performing with N-Dubz in 2009

Dappy appeared on the television show Never Mind the Buzzcocks on 29 November 2007, on Phill Jupitus' team, and wore a trademark "Dappy hat", also giving one to Simon Amstell to wear as part of the gag. Despite vowing he would not return to the show he appeared for a second time on the guest team on 4 December 2008 and for a third time, on Phill's team, which was broadcast on 18 November 2009. He is known to be a good friend of Chris Moyles and also gets on well with Tinchy Stryder after releasing a single together, called "Number 1". Dappy has made cameo appearances on K.I.G's "Head, Shoulders, Kneez and Toez" music video, Gracious K's "Migraine Skank" music video, and Chipmunk's "Chip Diddy Chip" music video, as one of Chipmunk's school friends.

=== 2011–2014: Solo projects and Bad Intentions ===
It was announced on 17 June 2011 that N-Dubz had left their American record deal, amid rumours that the band had split. These rumours began circulating again in August 2011; however, Dappy insisted the band had not split, but were simply taking a break. As such, during the band's hiatus period, all three members decided to embark upon solo careers. Before the band's split, Dappy signed a contract with Takeover Entertainment Ltd that confirmed that if the band ever split or went on hiatus, he would continue as a solo artist. His first taste of solo stardom came as a guest artist on label-mate Tinchy Stryder's single "Spaceship", which was released in June 2011. While deciding upon his debut solo single, Dappy was contacted by Def Jam, asking him what he would like done with the demos of a track N-Dubz had recorded whilst under the label, which remained unreleased. Dappy decided to re-record the track, "No Regrets", and release it as his debut solo effort. Featuring a cameo appearance from band-mate Fazer, "No Regrets" took the charts by storm, peaking at #1 in the UK and Scotland, and at #8 in Ireland.

Following the success of "No Regrets", Dappy claimed during an interview that: "With my solo stuff, I really want to earn the respect of an older audience. I don't think there's any shame in trying to write music that will be recognised by people I admire. Bono. I have big goals. I want to have two #1 singles back-to-back as a solo artist." Dappy soon succeeded, gaining praise from Queen guitarist Brian May, who was "impressed" with "No Regrets". As a result, Dappy invited May for a guest stint on his second single, which coincidentally was titled "Rockstar". "Rockstar" was released on 26 February 2012. On 29 February, Dappy revealed that the title of his album would be Bad Intentions, claiming that the album "is motivational music for people who believe they can't do nothing, a battle we have with our own mind." The album's third single was "Come with Me". Subsequently, he revealed that the fourth single will be "Good Intentions", and if "Rockstar" peaks at #1 on the UK Singles Chart, he will enlist Barbadian singer Rihanna and British superstar Adele, who will both have vocal sections on the single. He claimed that Rihanna contacted him after she was impressed with a demo tape she had heard of his music. Dappy confirmed in September 2011, before the release of "Rockstar" and "Bad Intentions", that the album's final single will be a collaboration with The Wanted, which will be released towards the end of 2012.

=== 2015–present: Eros Apollo and singles ===
Dappy's single "Beautiful Me" was released on 29 March 2015 and reached number 19 in the UK. The song captures aspects of Dappy's troubled life over the preceding years. The music video for the song premiered on 28 January 2015, documenting his financial woes, legal battles, and affairs. He followed this up with the promotional release "100 (Built for This)" in July, and the full single "Money Can't Buy" in September 2015. All three songs were set to be included on his second All Around the World album Miracles in November 2015, but the album did not eventuate and Dappy has since left All Around the World and released his first independent EP, Eros Apollo, on Christmas Day 2015.

In 2016, Dappy released the singles "Hip Hip Hooray" and "Kiss" and a Freestyle called "Messi" these songs again were released via an independent label/management partnership called LEX Music Corp

On 31 July 2017, Dappy released the single "Straight Facts". Again this was part of a new management deal with PlayDirty manager Vash who currently manages Krept and Konan . The music video was released the same day.

On 12 October 2017, Dappy released his second single under the PlayDirty management called "Spotlight"; this song charted at 56 in the UK Singles Chart.

In 2018, he released his single "Oh My" featuring fellow British rapper Ay Em. It peaked at 23 in the charts. He followed this up with the song "All We Know" which peaked at 64 and released an acoustic onto YouTube called "Count on Me".

In 2019, Dappy collaborated with Tory Lanez releasing 'Not Today'.

== Reception ==
In mid 2007, Dappy released "Love for My Slum" with fellow UK rap artist Baker Trouble, which was number one on Channel U (then Channel AKA, now Now 70s) for several weeks and was a big hit in the underground urban scene. However, it didn't do as well with the media and was heavily criticised for a scene in which Dappy is standing outside a block of expensive luxury flats with a "rich kid" who is trying to look like a gangster. The Independent wrote, "His lyrics combine jealousy with anger: 'You got too much to lose / You're in a great position... You wouldn't last a minute where I'm from / You'd go missing / So appreciate what you got / 'cos I'm still wishing.' And then he grabs the rich kid by his coat, pulls him toward him, and punches him in the face. The silent boy falls instantly to the pavement ... Do scenes like these suggest that music videos are encouraging their viewers to indulge in criminality?". Other papers put that he was "idolising thuggery". When asked in interviews about the single, following these comments he said "these people need to listen to the lyrics, they are about showing appreciation to what you've got".

== The Chris Moyles Show incident ==
On 12 January 2010, Contostavlos appeared on The Chris Moyles Show on BBC Radio 1 with Fazer and Tulisa. The show received a text message from a woman in Boston, Lincolnshire, complaining that Dappy was "vile" and "a little boy with a silly hat" and that N-Dubz were "losers". Dappy secretly copied her phone number from the studio console and, the following day, tried calling her and sent threatening messages including: "Your [sic] gonna die. U sent a very bad msg towards Ndubz on The Chris Moyels [sic] show yesterday Morning and for that reason u will never be left alone!!! u say sorry I will leave u alone u ****." The woman claimed that she continued to receive messages after declining to apologise, one of which said: "u dum f*********head u can call me names over the radio but when I call u direct u chicken out u punk!nana f******niii, Dappy". (Note: The Guardian wrote that asterisks were presumably added by The Sun, who originally reported the story.) Dappy's management later apologised on his behalf and offered free tickets to one of his concerts, but he has not apologised to the woman personally. N-Dubz were subsequently dropped from the Government's anti-bullying "R U Cyber Safe?" campaign.

== Personal life ==
Dappy is cousin to fellow band member Tulisa. He lives in St Albans. He has two sons, Gino and Milo.

Born and raised in Camden Town, North London, Contostavlos grew up with his Greek-speaking parents, Byron Contostavlos and Zoi Agorou and older brother Spiros. Byron died on 12 April 2007. His father was from Cyprus, and his mother is from Sparta.

He revealed that he is a "massive" Arsenal fan when N-Dubz appeared on Live from Studio Five, gushing "it is an honour to sit next to you" to former Arsenal striker Ian Wright who was one of three hosts on the show.

In May 2015, Dappy endorsed his manager Archie Lamb's father, Norman, in the Liberal Democrats leadership election.

=== Criminal convictions ===
Dappy was convicted of battery in 2007. In December 2008, Dappy pleaded guilty to two counts of assault at Chelmsford Magistrates Court, Essex after reportedly spitting in a woman's face while drunk on a night out. Dappy pleaded guilty to the offences and for each count received four weeks' imprisonment, suspended for 12 months, to run concurrently and 100 hours community service. He was also ordered to pay £50 compensation to the woman and her friend and £300 costs.

In January 2013, he was found guilty by a jury at Guildford Crown Court of assault and affray and given a suspended sentence of six months imprisonment. In February 2014, Dappy hit a man in Chelmsford for which, on 19 June 2014, he was convicted of common assault and fined. In September of the same year, he was convicted of an assault in Reading and given a two-month suspended prison sentence. In 2017, Dappy was convicted of possession of a bladed article in a public place following an altercation with his partner and given a suspended prison sentence.

== Discography ==
- Bad Intentions (2012)
- Fortune (2021)
