= Tulisa discography =

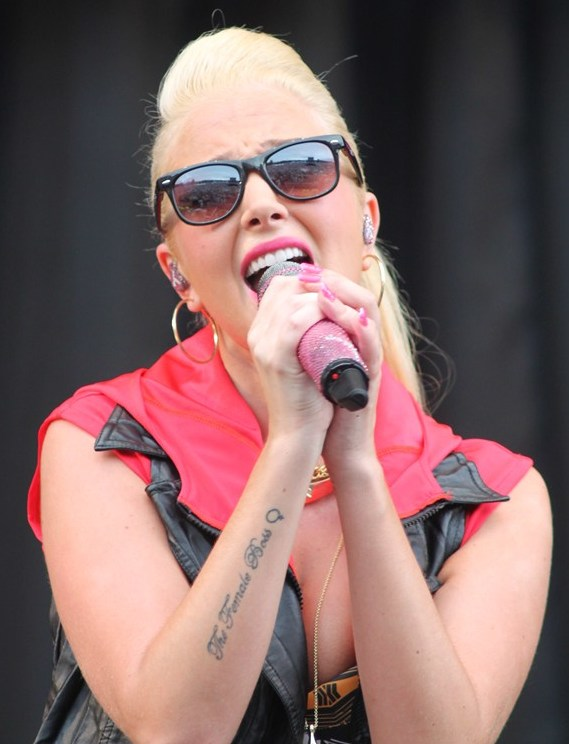
- Tulisa in 2012
- Studio albums: 1
- Singles: 7
- Music videos: 6

The discography of British singer and songwriter Tulisa consists of one studio album, seven singles and six music videos.

Tulisa's solo career began on 29 April 2012, when she released the first solo single from her debut solo album "Young". The single was released as part of a remixes EP, which charted at number 5 on the Irish Singles Chart and hit the top spot at number 1 on the UK Singles Chart. On 9 September 2012, Tulisa released her second solo single "Live It Up", which features guest vocals from American rapper Tyga. The single debuted at number 11 in the UK. Tulisa released her third and final single from the album, "Sight of You" on 2 December 2012 and charted at number 18 in the UK. On 3 December 2012, she released her debut solo album The Female Boss which peaked at number 35 on the UK Albums Chart but failed to chart in the top 40 in Ireland.

On 20 October 2014, nearly two years after her last single release, Tulisa premiered "Living Without You", the lead single from her second album. The single was set to be released 7 December 2014, before getting pushed back to 15 December 2014. The single then got pushed back a third time and was released on 4 January 2015. "Living Without You", peaked at number 44 on the UK Singles Chart but failed to chart on the Irish Singles Chart. In 2014, Tulisa announced that she would have to have had released at least four hit singles before releasing a second solo album. In 2016, Tulisa featured on the underground club DJ Carnao Beats track "Love You for Tonight" which became an urban club smash.

In April 2019, Tulisa made a comeback with the single "Daddy" after signing a record deal with Xploded Music. After releasing her comeback single "Daddy", Tulisa released the single "Sippin'" in July 2019.

In November 2024, Tulisa released "In the Air" featuring Alex Ross through Xploded Music. The release coincided with Tulisa's appearance on ITV's I'm a Celebrity, and followed the single "Charmer" (2022) and album Timeless (2023) with N-Dubz.

== Albums ==
List of albums, with selected chart positions and certifications
Title	Album details	Peak chart positions		
Title	Album details	UK	IRE	SCO
The Female Boss	Released: 3 December 2012; Label: AATW, Island; Formats: CD, digital download	35	55	46

== Singles ==
=== As lead artist ===
List of singles as lead artist with selected chart positions and certifications
Title	Year	Peak chart positions			Certifications	Album
Title	Year	UK	IRE	SCO	Certifications	Album
"Young"	2012	1	5	1	BPI: Gold	The Female Boss
"Live It Up" (featuring Tyga)	2012	11	41	14		The Female Boss
"Sight of You"	2012	18	39	17		The Female Boss
"Living Without You"	2015	44	—	23		Non-album singles
"Sweet Like Chocolate" (featuring Akelle)	2016	—	—	—		Non-album singles
"Daddy"	2019	—	—	—		Non-album singles
"Sippin'"	2019	—	—	—		Non-album singles
"In the Air" (featuring Alex Ross)	2024	—	—	—		Non-album singles
"—" denotes a recording that did not chart or was not released in that territory.

=== As featured artist ===
List of singles as featured artist with selected chart positions
Title	Year	Peak chart positions			Album
Title	Year	UK	IRE	SCO	Album
"Teardrop" (as part of The Collective)	2011	24	—	30	Non-album singles
"Love You for Tonight" (Carnao Beats featuring Tulisa)	2016	—	—	—	Non-album singles
"Bridge over Troubled Water" (as part of Artists for Grenfell)	2017	1	25	1	Non-album singles
"—" denotes a recording that did not chart or was not released in that territory.

=== Promotional singles ===
List of promotional singles with selected chart positions
Title	Year	Peak positions	Album
Title	Year	UK	Album
"Live Your Life"	2012	165	The Female Boss

== Guest appearances ==
Title	Year	Album
"Hands in the Air" (Wiley featuring Tulisa, Chip & Ice Kid)	2013	The Ascent
"Tarzan 2.75 / At It Again" (Dappy featuring Tulisa)	2015	Eros Apollo

== Music videos ==
Title	Year	Director(s)
"Teardrop"	2011	Ben Vertex and Ben Leinster
"Young"	2012	Ben Peters
"Live It Up"	2012	Colin Tilley
"Sight of You"	2012	Luke Hyams
"Living Without You"	2014	Life Garland
"Sweet Like Chocolate"	2016	Daps
"Daddy"	2019	Sesan
