= The Female Boss =

Studio album by Tulisa
- Released: 30 November 2012
- Genres: Hip-hop; grime; R&B
- Length: 58:27
- Labels: All Around the World; Island
- Producers: Terius "The-Dream" Nash; Richard "Fazer" Rawson; Patrick Jordan-Patrikios; Jean Baptiste; Stereotypes; Ryan Buendia; Toby Gad; Rico Love; Diane Warren; Eg White; STL

Singles from The Female Boss
- 1. "Young" Released: 29 April 2012; 2. "Live It Up" Released: 9 September 2012; 3. "Sight of You" Released: 2 December 2012

The Female Boss is the debut solo album by the English singer-songwriter and N-Dubz member Tulisa. It was initially released in Ireland on 30 November 2012, and released in the UK on 3 December 2012 via All Around the World and Island Records. The album's artwork was revealed on 6 October 2012 via Tulisa's official Facebook page. The Female Boss originally was to be released on 26 November but was pushed back by one week. It incorporates hip-hop, grime and R&B styles while enlisting a variety of producers The-Dream, Fazer, Stereotypes, Rico Love, Diane Warren and Ed White, among others. The album features guests appearances from British rapper Wiley, American rapper Tyga and Nines. Three singles preceded the album's release; the lead single "Young" peaked at number 1 while "Live It Up" and "Sight of You" peaked within the top 20 of the UK Singles Chart.

The Female Boss has received generally negative reviews from music critics, with many panning the themes, intro of the album, production and lyrical content, while others felt the dance songs were highlights. Commercially, the album opened with poor sales, debuting at number 35 on the UK Albums Chart, number 46 in Scotland and number 55 in Ireland.

== Background ==
The Female Boss was recorded throughout 2012. The album's second single, "Live It Up", was released on 9 September 2012, before the ballad "Sight of You" was released on 25 November 2012 as the album's third single. Tulisa revealed that her decision to release three singles prior to the album's release was to "focus on the long-term sales of the record". "Visa" was originally recorded by N-Dubz for their third studio album, Love.Live.Life in 2010 but did not make the final track list.

Tulisa said of the album in an interview with Digital Spy: "Having a number one album isn't important. Let me tell you something, do you know how many artists go to number one in the charts and they release on a certain week because they know that in that week they have more chance of going to number one? Then they drop out of the album charts a week later and they might have sold 100,000 when they could have sold 400,000. For me, just like with N-Dubz, I don't care about having a number one album, I care about going platinum. I care about the overall sales. What's the point in having a number one but people saying, 'She only sold 60,000 though'? I don't want that. Most people these days kind of drop the one single and then the album but that was one thing I said I would never do," she explained. "I have to put the background work in. I've got to give people a reason to buy it. I want to prove myself this year, more than ever, as a musician and as a solo artist."

== Reception ==
=== Critical response ===
Professional ratings
Aggregate scores
Source	Rating
Metacritic	35/100
Review scores
Source	Rating
AllMusic	1.5/5 stars
The Independent	3/5 stars
4Music	3/5 stars
MusicOMH	1/5 stars
Digital Spy	2/5 stars
The Observer	2/5 stars
Q	(mixed)

The Female Boss has received mostly negative reviews from contemporary music critics. At Metacritic, which assigns a normalized rating out of 100 to reviews from mainstream critics, The Female Boss received an average score of 35, which indicates "generally unfavourable reviews", based on 6 reviews; it is the lowest-rated album on the site by a female artist. Lewis Corner from Digital Spy was less harsh, but criticised the production with The-Dream saying "The result is an overly-considered debut that suffers from one-too-many label hook-ups for a singer who is way out of her depth." Phil Mongredien from The Observer awarded it two stars out of five believing her debut did not sound promising. Amy Gravelle from Entertainmentwise felt that the R&B and hip-hop songs were main issues on the album and felt she should stick to dance music, and criticised her "clichéd lyrics" and themes on the entire album.

Philip Matusavage from MusicOMH awarded it a single star out of five, saying "[The Female Boss] is more endurance test than anything else, with the strong sense of 'will this do?’." He panned the intro and themes, calling them "hilarious" and felt "bafflement is typical of an album which has almost no identity of its own, instead sounding like a calculated effort to target certain demographic markets." Q gave it a mixed review, feeling the album "Struggles to get to grips with the predictably generic R&B ballads." Aneet Nijjar from Allmusic rated the album one-and-a-half stars out of five. In comparison to her former band N-Dubz, she stated they had "have bags of charisma, and most important of all, the songs" but stated the album "has neither." She found that Tulisa did not "convince" her abilities of producing pop and urban music and criticised it for being "fleeting and insufficient", calling the album "a lamentable debut all round."

On a more positive review, Andy Gill from The Independent compared the album to works of Rihanna, saying that she "tries to turn adversity to her advantage, employing the incident as her own version of the familiar R&B soap-opera gambit, whereby the private life becomes the subtext," but he nevertheless felt most of the songs were bad.

=== Commercial performance ===
The Female Boss entered the UK Albums Chart lower than its midweek position of 17, debuting at number 35 with over 15,000 copies sold. The following week the album dropped out of the Top 40, falling to number 63. The album remained in the Top 100 for a further 2 weeks.

== Singles ==
"Young" was released as the album's lead single on 29 April 2012. The single went straight to number one in the United Kingdom, becoming the fastest selling debut single of the year, and the third fastest selling single overall, following the release of Cheryl Cole's "Call My Name".

"Live It Up" was released as the album's second single on 10 September 2012. The track was announced on 24 July, and features vocals from American rapper Tyga. Tulisa commented on the song, saying: "This track is me going back to being me, and trying to define myself as an artist. It's even more urban than anything else i've done before". The music video was released on 24 August 2012 and the single peaked at number 11 on the UK Singles Chart.

"Sight of You" and "Live Your Life" were released as a double A-side, and the album's third single on 25 November 2012. On 11 September, Tulisa revealed that "Sight of You" would be a "Christmassy ballad", stating "I think it's important for every artist to have that ballad that stands the test of time." "Live Your Life" (previously revealed to be "Freedom", and later re-titled) was written and produced by fellow N-Dubz musician Fazer, and is similar to her debut single, "Young". The song premiered on radio on 19 October 2012. Tulisa confirmed during an interview with KissFM that the music video would be released on 22 October. She performed the single on The X Factor on 2 December. The song entered the UK Singles Chart at number 18, becoming Tulisa's lowest-charting solo single in the UK.

== Track listing ==
Standard edition
No.	Title	Writer(s)	Producer(s)	Length
1.	"Intro"	Patrick Patrikios	Patrikios	1:18
2.	"Young"	Richard Rawson; Peter Ibsen; Ali Tennant	STL	4:12
3.	"Live It Up" (featuring Tyga)	Rico Love; Tula Contostavlos; Pierre Medor; Paul Love; Barrington Levy; Michael Stevenson	Love; Medor	3:52
4.	"Damn"	T. Contostavlos; Rawson; Jean Baptiste; Ryan Buendia	Baptiste; Renato López	3:02
5.	"British Swag" (featuring Nines)	T. Contostavlos; Courtney Freckleton; Jonathan Yip; Jeremy Reeves; Ray Romulus; Ray McCullough; Corey Gibson; Courtney Harrell	The Stereotypes; Ra Charm; Corey Gibson; Courtney Harrell	3:41
6.	"Live Your Life"	Rawson; T. Contostavlos; Ibsen; Tennant	STL	3:57
7.	"Visa" (featuring Wiley)	Costadinos Contostavlos; T. Contostavlos; Richard Cowie; Yip; Reeves; Romulus; M A E S T R O (Maestro Harrell); Ursula (Yancy)	The Stereotypes; M A E S T R O	3:31
8.	"Foreigner"	Terius Nash	The-Dream	4:50
9.	"Skeletons"	Nash	The-Dream	4:50
10.	"I'm Ready"	T. Contostavlos; Baptiste; Buendia; Michael McHenry	Baptiste; López	3:47
11.	"Steal My Breath Away"	T. Contostavlos; Toby Gad; Rachel Rabin; Tyrone Griffin, Jr.; Max Gousse	Gad	4:17
12.	"Kill Me Tonight"	T. Contostavlos; Gad; Baptiste; Rabin; Griffin, Jr.; Gousse	Baptiste	3:47
13.	"Counterfeit"	Diane Warren	Warren	4:07
14.	"Habit"	T. Contostavlos; Eg White	White	3:49
15.	"Sight of You"	Nash	The-Dream	4:39
16.	"Outro"	Patrick Patrikios	Patrikios	0:39
Total length:				58:27

Deluxe edition bonus tracks
No.	Title	Writer(s)	Producer(s) / Director(s)	Length
17.	"Live It Up" (solo acoustic mix)	Rico Love; Tula Contostavlos; Pierre Medor; Paul Love; Barrington Levy; Michael Stevenson	Andy Rogers	2:58
18.	"Young" (acoustic mix)	Rawson; Ibsen; Tennant	Andy Rogers	3:27
19.	"Skeletons" (acoustic mix)	Nash	Andy Rogers	3:54
20.	"Titanium" (acoustic mix)	Sia Furler; David Guetta; Giorgio Tuinfort; Nick Van De Wall	Andy Rogers	3:50
21.	"Young" (music video)			3:49
22.	"Live It Up" (music video)			3:41
23.	"Sight of You" (music video)			4:04
24.	"The Female Boss" (Video Interview)			3:00

== Charts ==
Chart performance for The Female Boss
Chart (2012)	Peak position
Irish Albums (IRMA)	55
Scottish Albums (Official Charts)	46
UK Albums (Official Charts)	35

== Release history ==
Release history and formats for The Female Boss
Regions	Dates	Format(s)	Label(s)
Ireland	30 November 2012	CD, digital download	All Around the World, Island
United Kingdom	3 December 2012	CD, digital download	All Around the World, Island
United States	1 January 2024	CD, digital download	All Around the World, Island
