= Living Without You (Tulisa song) =

Single by Tulisa
- Released: 4 January 2015
- Recorded: 2014
- Genre: Dance
- Label: All Around the World; Island
- Songwriter(s): Peter Ibsen; Robert McDade; Richard Rawson; Karl Michael Richards
- Producer(s): STL

Tulisa singles chronology
"Sight of You" (2012)	"Living Without You" (2015)	"Sweet Like Chocolate" (2016)

"Living Without You" is a song recorded by the British singer Tulisa on 4 January 2015, her first single in over two years.

== Background ==
On 20 October 2014, it was officially revealed that Tulisa's new single would be titled "Living Without You" with a release date of 7 December 2014. The song was premiered on the same day as the reveal, with a lyric video being uploaded to YouTube. The single artwork was revealed on 1 November 2014. The single release date was pushed back to 14 December 2014 and finally to 4 January 2015.

== Music video ==
The accompanying music video was directed by Life Garland and released on 29 October 2014.

== Live performances ==
Various promotional performances of the song were also performed, including a live show at G-A-Y on 29 November 2014. On 14 December, Tulisa appeared on This Morning and performed an acoustic version. On New Year's Eve, Tulisa performed the song on Alan Carr's New Year's Specstacular.

== Track listing ==
- Digital download
1. "Living Without You" – 3:24
- Digital download (Remixes)
1. "Living Without You" (Extended Mix) – 5:18
2. "Living Without You" (Brook Mason Remix) – 5:37
3. "Living Without You" (Fielden Club Mix) – 5:08

== Charts ==
Chart (2015)	Peak position
Belgium (Ultratip Bubbling Under Flanders)	34
Belgium Dance (Ultratop Flanders)	30
Scotland (OCC)	23
UK Singles (OCC)	44
UK Dance (OCC)	14
UK Singles Downloads (OCC)	25

== Release history ==
Region	Date	Format	Label
Ireland	4 January 2015	Digital download	All Around the World, Island
United Kingdom	4 January 2015	Digital download	All Around the World, Island
