= Live It Up (Tulisa song) =

Single by Tulisa featuring Tyga

from the album The Female Boss
- Released: 9 September 2012
- Recorded: 2012
- Genre: Hip hop; R&B
- Length: 3:36
- Label: All Around the World; Island
- Songwriters: Tulisa Contostavlos; Richard Butler; Pierre Medor; Paul Love; Barrington Levy; Micheal Nyugen Stevenson
- Producer: Rico Love

Tulisa singles chronology
"Young" (2012)	"Live It Up" (2012)	"Sight of You" (2012)

Tyga singles chronology
"Celebration" (2012)	"Live It Up" (2012)	"Do My Dance" (2012)

Live It Up is the second solo single by the English singer Tulisa, and features guest vocals from American rapper Tyga. The song is taken from her debut studio album, The Female Boss, and was released on 9 September 2012.

== Background ==
The song was announced as Tulisa's second single on 24 July 2012. When asked about the song, Tulisa told Capital FM: "This is now me going back to me and trying to define myself as an artist because I knew I wanted a number one hit as my first release. I got that with 'Young', so I went even more urban with this second single. I don't expect it to even possibly get top ten it's that urban, but you never know. The fanbase could pull through, the N-Dubletts could pull through, and it is a smash but it's an urban smash and I know that in the UK these days it is a lot tougher with urban music."

== Music video ==
The lyric video for the song premiered on 24 July 2012. The music video for the song was shot in Hawaii and is directed by Colin Tilley. The official video premiered on 20 August 2012.

== Track listing ==
Digital download

1. "Live It Up" (radio edit) – 3:36
2. "Live It Up" (album mix) – 3:50
3. "Live It Up" (explicit Mix) – 4:36
4. "Live It Up" (Big League dancehall mix) – 4:17

Promotional CD single

1. "Live It Up" (radio edit) (Featuring Tyga) – 3:36
2. "Live It Up" (radio edit)

== Charts ==
Chart (2012)	Peak position
Ireland (IRMA)	41
Scotland Singles (OCC)	14
UK Singles (OCC)	11

== Release history ==
Region	Date	Format	Label
Ireland	9 September 2012	Digital download	All Around the World
United Kingdom	9 September 2012	Digital download	All Around the World
