= Daddy (Tulisa song) =

Single by Tulisa

from the album TBA
- Released: 5 April 2019
- Genre: Dancehall; R&B
- Length: 3:17
- Label: Xploded
- Songwriter(s): Tulisa Contostavlos; David Lucius King
- Producer(s): David Lucius King

Tulisa singles chronology
| "Sweet like Chocolate" (2016) | "Daddy" (2019) | "Sippin'" (2019) |

"Daddy" is a song by British singer Tulisa, released as a single on 5 April 2019 by Xploded/Universal Music. Tulisa co-wrote the track with David Lucius King. Tulisa's first release in three years, it was called her comeback single, and is reportedly the first in a "quickfire" series of singles she will release.

== Background ==
Tulisa said that she "took some time out of the spotlight to refocus on what is important" to her, and that music is "not about chasing celebrity or chart positions" for her, but rather about releasing music that she believes in.

== Critical reception ==
NME called the track "playful" and "dancehall-flecked", as well as a return to Tulisa's "urban roots".
