= Before They Were Dubz =

- Directed by: Jessica Grace Mellor
- Written by: Arlene Dignam
- Produced by: Donna Dee
- Starring: Dappy; Tulisa; Fazer; Wretch 32; Angel; J2K
- Edited by: Donna Dee
- Production company: Victrixx Films
- Distributed by: Exile Media Group
- Release date: 30 May 2011
- Running time: 71 minutes
- Country: England
- Language: English
- Budget: £22,000

Before They Were Dubz is a Straight-to-DVD documentary film, directed by Jessica Grace Mellor, that charts the history of English hip-hop group N-Dubz, from their early days when they were as young as twelve, to the point of their major label signing in 2007 by All Around the World Records. The film features footage recorded during the early years of the band, pieced together with interviews from friends and colleagues of the group, including Wretch 32, J2K and Angel.

== Synopsis ==
The documentary film follows footage filmed by Jessica Grace Mellor, an amateur director and photographer who filmed footage of the band during their early days in 2002, in an attempt to secure them a record deal with a major label. At the time, band members Dappy, Tulisa and Fazer were fourteen, thirteen and fifteen respectively, and had begun working with Garage producer Donna Dee, who helped them create some of their very first tracks, and perform some of their first gigs, and is the person who requested that Grace Mellor film some footage of the band. Footage included in the film includes the band working with Dappy's father and Tulisa's uncle, Byron, performing and mixing material in the studio, as well as interviews with some of the band's label colleagues and well known friends, including Wretch 32, J2K and Angel. The film concludes with a short discussion on the height of the British music industry, and how the band contributed to making the British hip-hop scene better known.

== Cast ==
- Dappy - Himself
- Tulisa - Herself
- Fazer - Himself
- Wretch 32 - Himself
- J2K - Himself
- Angel - Himself
- Snakeyman - Himself
- Deekline - Himself
- Donna Dee - Herself
- Jessica Grace Mellor - Herself
- Byron Contostavlos - Himself
- Paul Contostavlos - Himself
