= Young (Tulisa song) =

Single by Tulisa

from the album The Female Boss
- Released: 29 April 2012
- Recorded: December 2011
- Genre: Dance
- Length: 4:12 (album version); 3:35 (radio edit)
- Label: All Around the World; Island
- Songwriters: Pete Ibsen; Richard Rawson; Ali Tennant
- Producers: Pete Ibsen; Richard Rawson

Tulisa singles chronology
"Teardrop" (2011)	"Young" (2012)	"Live It Up" (2012)

Music video
- "Young" on YouTube

"Young" is the debut solo single by the English singer-songwriter Tulisa from her debut album The Female Boss (2012). It was written by Pete Ibsen, Richard Rawson and Ali Tennant, while the production was handled by the former two. Upon discovering that the song was meant for another singer, Tulisa chose to record it herself. The track was originally titled "We Are Young" but was renamed to merely "Young" to avoid confusion with the 2012 Fun song of the same name. The dance song is about making mistakes while being young. "Young" was initially slated for release on 6 May 2012. However, it was only issued on 27 April in Ireland and the United Kingdom by All Around the World and Island Records for digital download and streaming.

The music video for the song was released on 23 March 2012, shortly after Tulisa was involved in a scandal regarding a sex tape leaked by an ex-boyfriend. As the video's release coincided with the leak, the latter was considered a publicity stunt by the public and critics with the intent of promoting the single. "Young" received mainly positive reviews from music critics, who praised its sound but criticised the lyrics. The song was commercially successful in the United Kingdom, debuting atop the chart and receiving a gold certification from the British Phonographic Industry (BPI). It also debuted at number one in Scotland and reached number five in Ireland. Tulisa performed it on the sixth season of Britain's Got Talent, at BBC Radio 1 and at Wireless Festival in 2012.

== Background and release ==
Tulisa was a member of British hip hop trio N-Dubz who went on hiatus in 2011 once she was given a jury spot on the British reality television music competition The X Factor. She heard "Young" in the studio and after discovering it was being developed for another singer, she was determined to record it herself. In an interview for BBC Radio 2, she recalled "they didn't even get a chance to pitch it to the [other singer], they were preparing it, it wasn't even finished and I was like, 'I'm having that song, give it to me'." Tulisa recorded the track in December 2011. In February 2012, she revealed that she recorded various potential singles and found it difficult choosing which she should release first. Talking to Capital, Tulisa said she had doubts about releasing it as she did not contribute to it but stated that "it was written in such a way that [she] could have wrote it anyway – [she] could relate to it that much".

Originally called "We Are Young", the song's title was promptly shortened ahead of its release to prevent confusion with Fun's "We Are Young" (2012). "Young" was first played on Chris Moyles's breakfast show on BBC Radio 1 on 23 March. Initially slated for release on 6 May, the track was instead released on 27 April in Ireland and the United Kingdom by All Around the World and Island Records for digital download and streaming. The album version of the track lasts for four minutes and 12 seconds, while the radio edit lasts for three minutes and 35 seconds.

== Composition ==
"Young" is a dance track which "deals with mistakes made during youth". Robert Copsey of Digital Spy noticed that Tulisa sings "I make mistakes that I learn from / 'Cause I'm young" over "a well-trodden mix of pulsing beats helmed by her former beau and bandmate, before a chorus of glorious strobing trance ensues." Jenn Selby, writing for Glamour, stated that Tulisa took inspiration from Kelly Rowland for the track. An editor for PurePeople noted that the track has a "spring break atmosphere". Speaking to The Guardian, Tulisa explained that "lyrically, musically, it had to be like – boom – here [she is] [...] And the music had to represent [her]. So even though it's got that urban edge, it's got an Ibiza edge too, because [she is] an Ibiza baby." "Young" was written by Pete Ibsen, Richard Rawson and Ali Tennant, with the former two producing it. James F. Reynolds mixed the track and Tony Dixon mastered it.

== Reception ==
"Young" received mainly positive reviews from music critics. Copsey gave the song a positive review, writing "musically she couldn't have picked a more certain path". Selby deemed it a "dancy, summer tune". PurePeople declared that the track resembles Katy Perry's "Firework" (2010) and that it enhances Tulisa's "powerful voice" and "girl next door profile". In a mixed review, Popjustice's Brad O'Mance called it a "pretty strong pop moment" but was critical of the lyrics, stating that they "[are] designed to appeal to people who want an excuse to act like a dickhead". News.com.au considered the lyrics to "seem strange in light of the sex tape".

In the United Kingdom, "Young" debuted at number one on the UK Singles Chart for the week ending dated 12 May 2012 with first-week sales of 121,000 copies, becoming the second fastest selling single of 2012 in the country behind DJ Fresh and Rita Ora's "Hot Right Now" (2012). The song received a gold certification from the British Phonographic Industry (BPI) in 2013. The track also debuted atop the chart in Scotland. It further reached number five in Ireland and number 52 in Slovakia.

== Promotion and controversy ==
The music video for the song was released on 23 March 2012. It depicts Tulisa spending her time with friends and performing various acts such as dancing, misbehaving in a luxury hotel, stealing a goat and then eating it under a bridge, and defacing a piece of art at an exhibition. Ben Peters filmed it in Miami in February, with British rapper Chip making a cameo appearance. Prior to the video's release, Tulisa was involved in a scandal regarding a sex tape leaked by an ex-boyfriend. As the video premiered shortly after the leak, she was accused of using the leak to promote the single. A spokesperson for Tulisa denied the claims that the leak was a publicity stunt with promotional purposes, while Tulisa denied leaking the tape herself. Both PurePeople and News.com.au reviewed the video negatively in light of the scandal.

Tulisa sang "Young" during the first semi-final of the sixth season of Britain's Got Talent in May 2012, which garnered attention for the "bizarre" outfit she wore. In the same month, she performed the song at BBC Radio 1. In July, during her performance of the track at the rap music festival Wireless she raised her middle finger, which was an act towards her ex-boyfriend who posted the tape online. English singer James Arthur gave a performance of the song during the ninth season of The X Factor.

== Personnel ==
Credits adapted from the liner notes of The Female Boss.

- Tulisa – lead vocals
- Richard Rawson – songwriter, producer
- Pete Ibsen – songwriter, producer
- Ali Tennant – songwriter
- James F. Reynolds – mixing
- Tony Dixon – mastering

== Track listing ==
- Irish and UK remix EP
1. "Young" – 3:35
2. "Young" (Preditah Mix) – 3:20
3. "Young" (Breeze & Modulate Mix) – 3:38
4. "Young" (Expanda Mix) – 4:35
5. "Young" (Agent X Mix) – 3:22
- US remix EP
1. "Young" (Gregor Salto Edit) – 3:16
2. "Young" (Gregor Salto Extended) – 5:34
3. "Young" (Gregor Salto Dub) – 5:16
4. "Young" (Vice Edit) – 3:36
5. "Young" (Vice Extended) – 6:00
6. "Young" (Vice Instrumental) – 6:00
7. "Young" (Expanda Remix Edit) – 3:29
8. "Young" (Expanda Remix) – 4:33
9. "Young" (Expanda Remix Instrumental) – 4:33
10. "Young" (Hector Fonseca Edit) – 4:03
11. "Young" (Hector Fonseca Club) – 6:02
12. "Young" (Hector Fonseca Dub) – 5:32

== Charts ==
=== Weekly charts ===
Weekly chart performance for "Young"
Chart (2012)	Peak position
Belgium (Ultratip Bubbling Under Flanders)	53
Belgium Dance (Ultratip Wallonia)	8
Ireland (IRMA)	5
Scottish Singles Sales (Official Charts)	1
Slovakia (Rádio Top 100)	52
UK Singles (Official Charts)	1

=== Year-end charts ===
Year-end chart performance for "Young"
Chart (2012)	Position
UK Singles (OCC)	43

== Certifications ==
Certifications for "Young"
Region	Certification	Certified units/sales
United Kingdom (BPI)	Gold	498,000

== Release history ==
Release dates and formats for "Young"
Region	Date	Format	Label	Ref.
Ireland	29 April 2012	Remix EP; digital download; streaming	All Around the World; Island	
United Kingdom	29 April 2012	Remix EP; digital download; streaming	All Around the World; Island	
United States	17 July 2012	Remix EP; digital download; streaming	All Around the World; Island	
