= Sight of You =

Single by Tulisa

from the album The Female Boss
- B-side: "Live Your Life"
- Released: 2 December 2012
- Recorded: 2012
- Genre: R&B
- Label: All Around the World; Island
- Songwriter: Terius Nash
- Producer: The-Dream

Tulisa singles chronology
"Live It Up" (2012)	"Sight of You" (2012)	"Living Without You" (2015)

"Sight of You" is the third single released from English singer-songwriter and N-Dubz member Tulisa's debut studio album, The Female Boss. The single was released on 2 December 2012, a day before the release of the album. The single was released alongside another brand new track, "Live Your Life", was written by fellow N-Dubz member Richard "Fazer" Rawson.

== Background ==
On 11 September 2012 Tulisa revealed that her new single would be a "Christmassy ballad" that would "stand the test of time", without revealing the track's title. Shortly after the announcement, she visited the BBC Radio 1 Live Lounge, where she performed album track and fellow ballad, "Skeletons". Thus, it was assumed that Skeletons was to be the single that Tulisa was describing. However, on 8 October 2012, press images captured on the set of her new music video confirmed the title of the single to be "Sight of You" and not "Skeletons". This was confirmed by Tulisa herself when she invited the contestants from her category on The X Factor to join her at the video shoot, and behind the scenes footage of the shoot was featured on the show. Shortly after, on 21 October 2012, the full official music video premiered via Tulisa's official VEVO account on YouTube. The video features Tulisa standing on a bridge with a city view, performing the song whilst traffic flows beneath her. Other scenes portray a heatbreaking relationship between Tulisa and her boyfriend, played by her short-term real life boyfriend Jody Latham. The single was then confirmed for release on 25 November 2012, a day before the album's release.

On 25 October, former N-Dubz bandmate Fazer announced that "Sight of You" would be released as a double A-side alongside one of the songs he had penned for her, entitled "Freedom". Shortly after, however, the single's track listing was revealed, and it was discovered that "Freedom" had in fact been re-titled "Live Your Life". Tulisa later performed "Sight of You" at G-A-Y on 17 November 2012, making it her first live performance of the track. On 19 November 2012 Tulisa stated in an interview: "I really feel like "Sight of You" is one of those power songs. I hope it touches people". It was then revealed just days before the album's release that both the album and single had been put back by a week, to 2 and 3 December respectively. As such, a planned performance of the track The X Factor was also pushed back by a week, and the performance was broadcast on 2 December 2012, despite being pre-recorded before the show's live broadcast. The single, along with "Live Your Life" and a number of remixes, was released on 2 December 2012.

== Track listing ==
- Digital download EP
1. "Sight of You" (Album Version) - 4:37
2. "Live Your Life" (Clean Version) - 3:58
3. "Sight of You" (Sticky Edit) - 3:37
4. "Sight of You" (TS7 Remix) - 5:31
5. "Sight of You" (Rudedog Remix) - 6:05
6. "Sight of You" (Music Video - Director's Cut) - 4:00
- Promotional CD single
1. "Sight of You" (Radio Edit) - 3:54
2. "Live Your Life" (Clean Radio Edit) - 3:18

== Charts ==
Chart (2012)	Peak position
Ireland (IRMA)	39
Scottish Singles Sales (Official Charts)	17
UK Singles (Official Charts)	18
UK Singles Downloads (Official Charts)	18

== Release history ==
Region	Date	Format	Label
Ireland	2 December 2012	Digital download, CD single	All Around the World, Island
United Kingdom	2 December 2012	Digital download, CD single	All Around the World, Island
