= The X Factor (British TV series) series 9 =

Season of television series

The X Factor
- Series 9
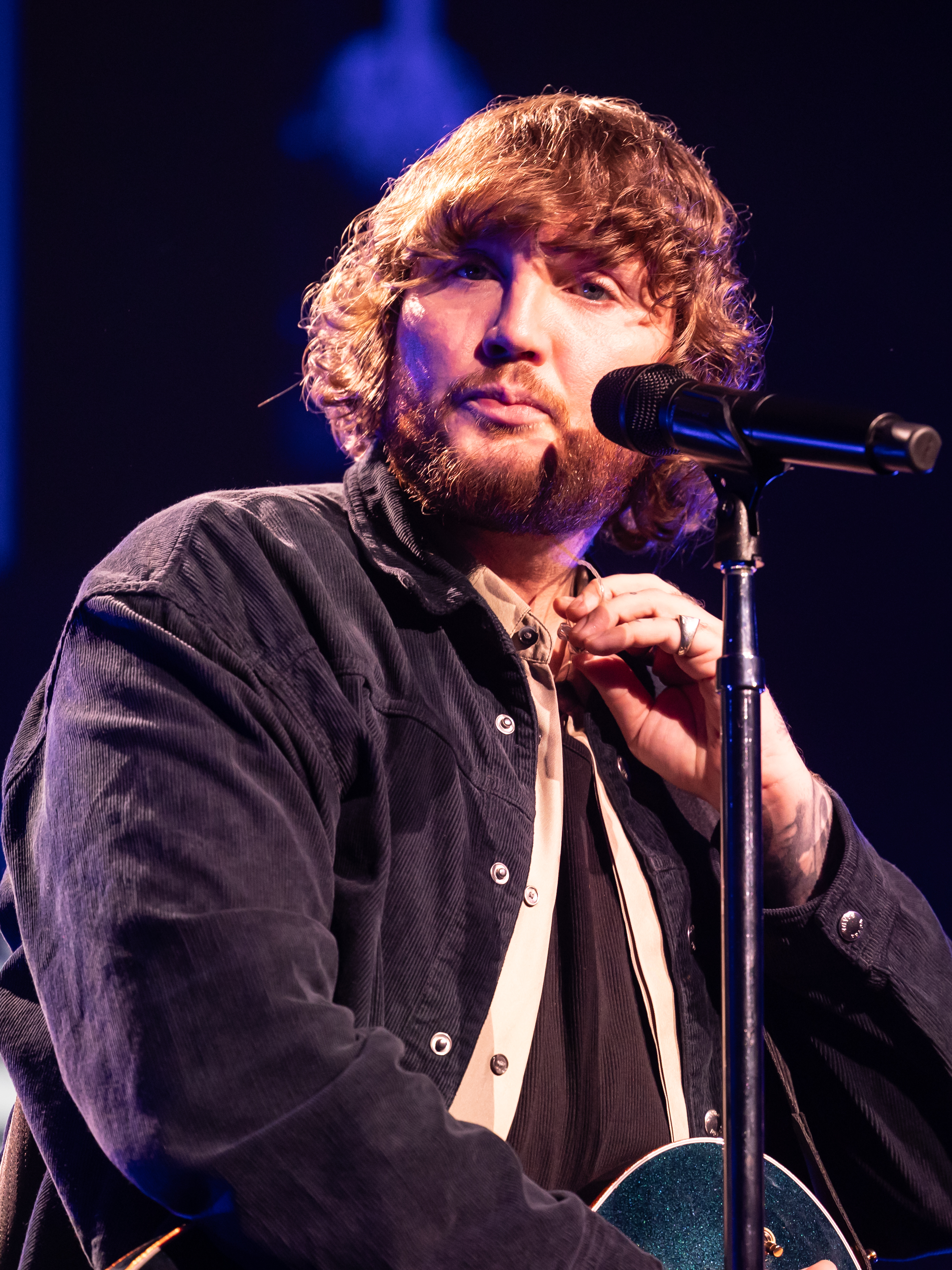
- James Arthur performing at the SWR3 New Pop Festival in 2023.
- Hosted by: Dermot O'Leary (ITV)
- Judges: Nicole Scherzinger (Guest for London auditions day 4, permanent from Newcastle auditions); Gary Barlow; Tulisa; Louis Walsh; Leona Lewis (London auditions day 1 and day 3 evening); Geri Halliwell (Liverpool auditions); Rita Ora (London auditions day 2 and day 3 morning); Mel B (Manchester auditions); Anastacia (Glasgow auditions)
- Winner: James Arthur
- Winning mentor: Nicole Scherzinger
- Runner-up: Jahméne Douglas
- Finals venue: Manchester Central

Release
- Original network: ITV; ITV2 (The Xtra Factor)
- Original release: 18 August – 9 December 2012

Series chronology
- ← Previous; Series 8 Next → Series 10

The X Factor is a British television music competition to find new singing talent. The ninth series began airing on ITV on 18 August 2012 and ended on 9 December 2012. Dermot O'Leary returned as presenter of the main show on ITV, whilst Caroline Flack and Olly Murs returned to co-present The Xtra Factor on ITV2. Louis Walsh, Gary Barlow and Tulisa returned as judges. Nicole Scherzinger was confirmed as the fourth permanent judge after Geri Halliwell, Leona Lewis, Rita Ora, Mel B, Anastacia and Scherzinger herself stood in as guest judges for the vacant position left by Kelly Rowland. After the show of 8 December, two of Scherzinger's acts, James Arthur and Jahméne Douglas, became the top two, meaning that Scherzinger was guaranteed to win. Arthur was announced as the winner on 9 December (the first winner in the show's history to have previously been in the bottom two), and released a cover of Shontelle's "Impossible" as his winner's song. As of 2016, it is the most successful winner's single in the show's history.

Auditions for the series took place between 23 May and 25 June 2012, in Liverpool, London, Manchester, Glasgow, Newcastle and Cardiff. Bootcamp took place in Liverpool for three days, between 19 and 22 July. Barlow mentored the over 28s, Scherzinger had the boys, Tulisa mentored the girls and Walsh had the groups. They selected their final three acts during judges' houses, which took place in Boughton House in Northamptonshire, Dubai, Saint Lucia and Las Vegas. The 12 finalists were joined by a 13th wildcard, voted for by the public after each judge picked one of their rejected to return. The live shows started on 6 October. The final was held at Manchester Central.

The trailer for the series, entitled "Whose Time Is Now?", premiered on 30 July, featuring former contestants Lewis, Alexandra Burke, JLS, Murs, One Direction and Little Mix talking about their time on The X Factor and how it had changed their lives. It was criticised by series 2 winner Shayne Ward because he was not included. The series was beset by several controversial issues throughout its run. In the auditions, these included Zoe Alexander, who swore at judges, accusing them of forcing her to sing a Pink song; Alison Brunton, whose audition was believed to have "caused unnecessary distress or anxiety" to her children; and Lorna Bliss, who gave Walsh a lap dance. The live shows were controversial for the eliminations of Carolynne Poole (after which Gary Barlow walked off the stage) and Ella Henderson, the fact that the voting lines opened before the contestants had performed, and also comments made by the judges—Tulisa using the term "MILF", Barlow insulting Tulisa's breath, and Scherzinger saying "effing". This series' launch was the lowest rated since 2006, and the show was often beaten in the ratings by other programmes such as Strictly Come Dancing, Downton Abbey and I'm a Celebrity...Get Me Out of Here!. The final received the lowest ratings of an X Factor final since 2005, until the following year's series final attracted worse ratings.

Within four-and-a-half months of the final, six of the series' finalists—Arthur, Douglas, Henderson, Christopher Maloney, Union J and Lucy Spraggan—had been signed to record labels.

== Judges, Presenters and Other Personnel ==
Judges and Presenter(s) for The X Factor Series 9

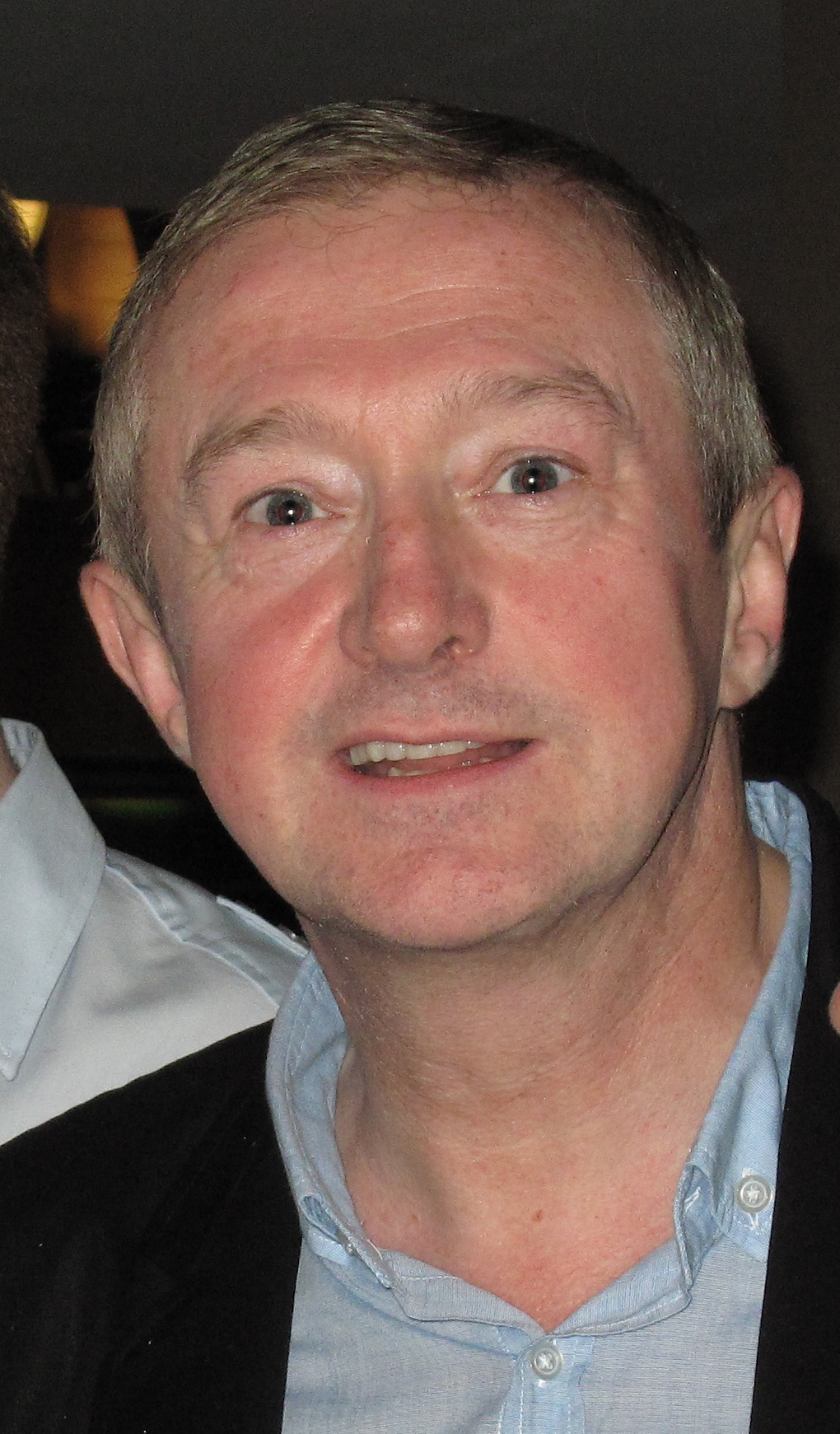
Louis Walsh

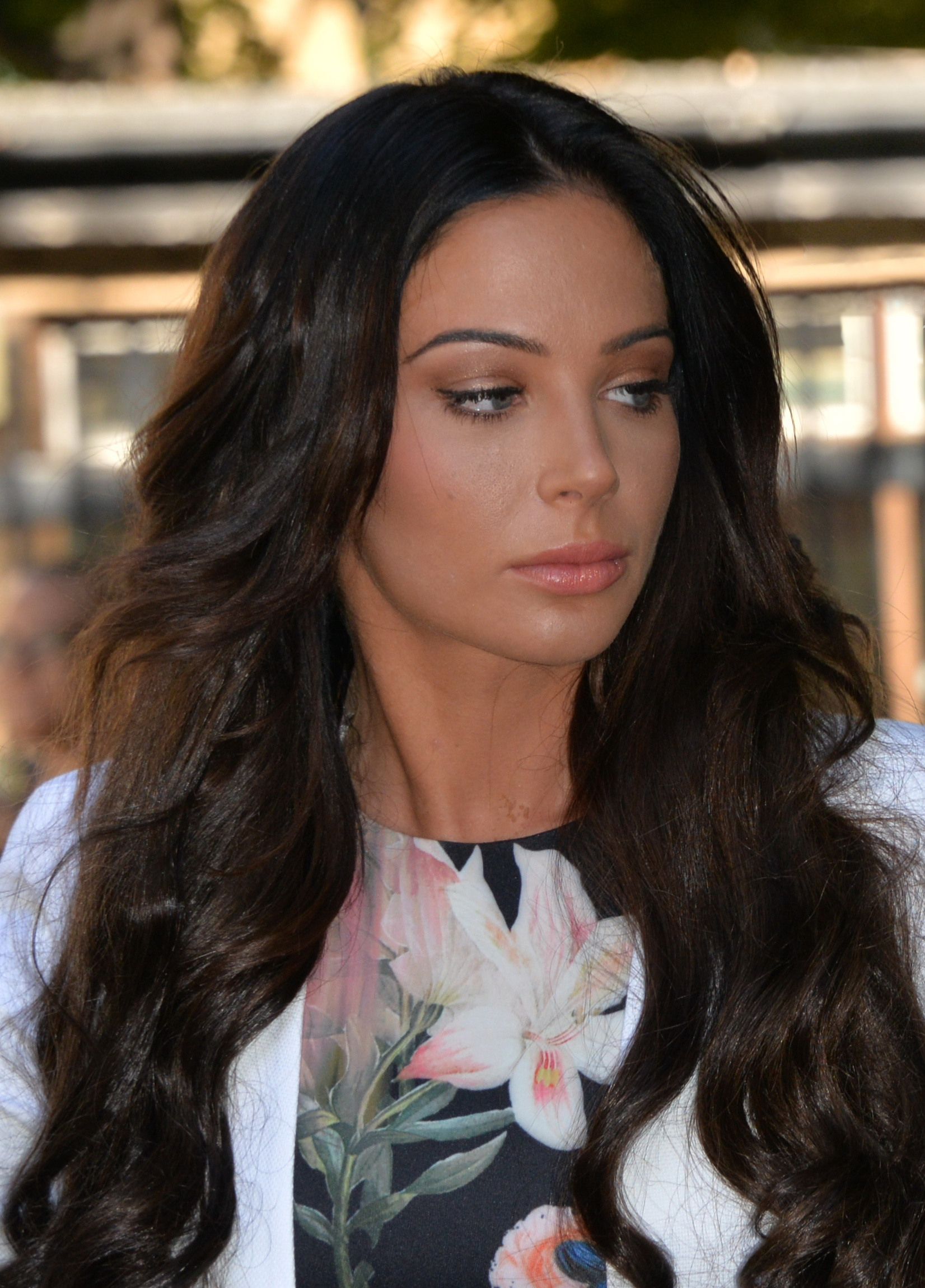
Tulisa

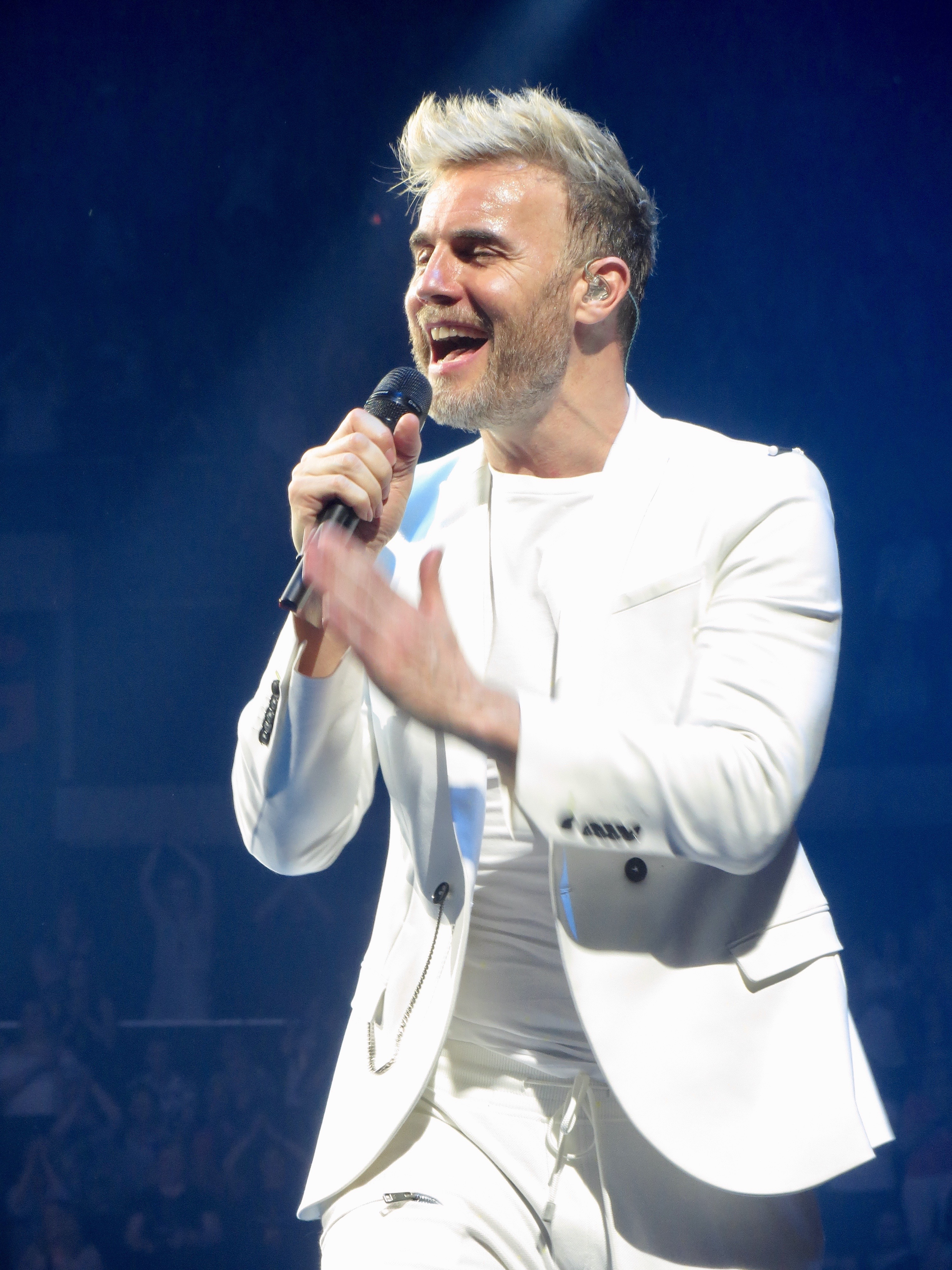
Gary Barlow

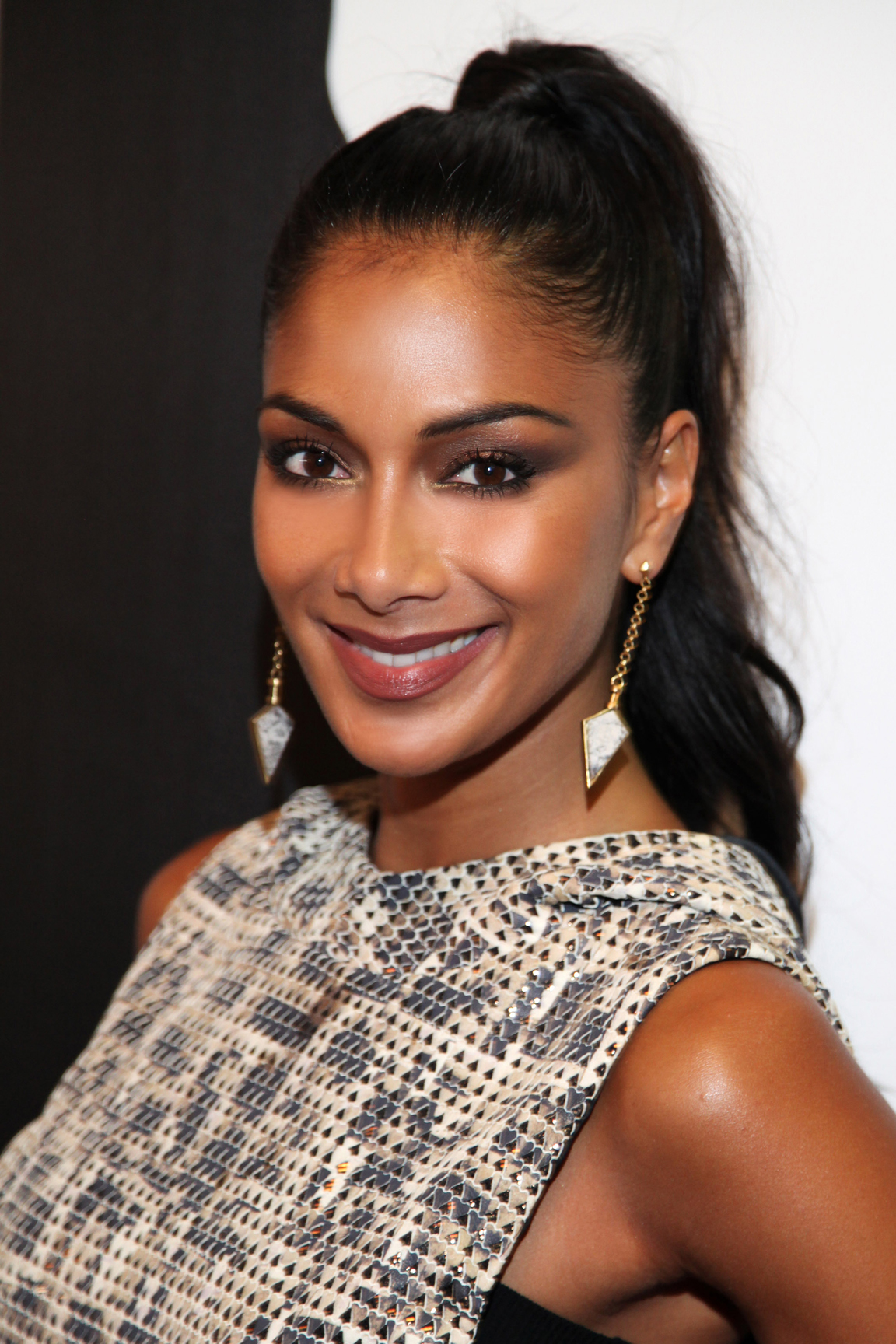
Nicole Scherzinger

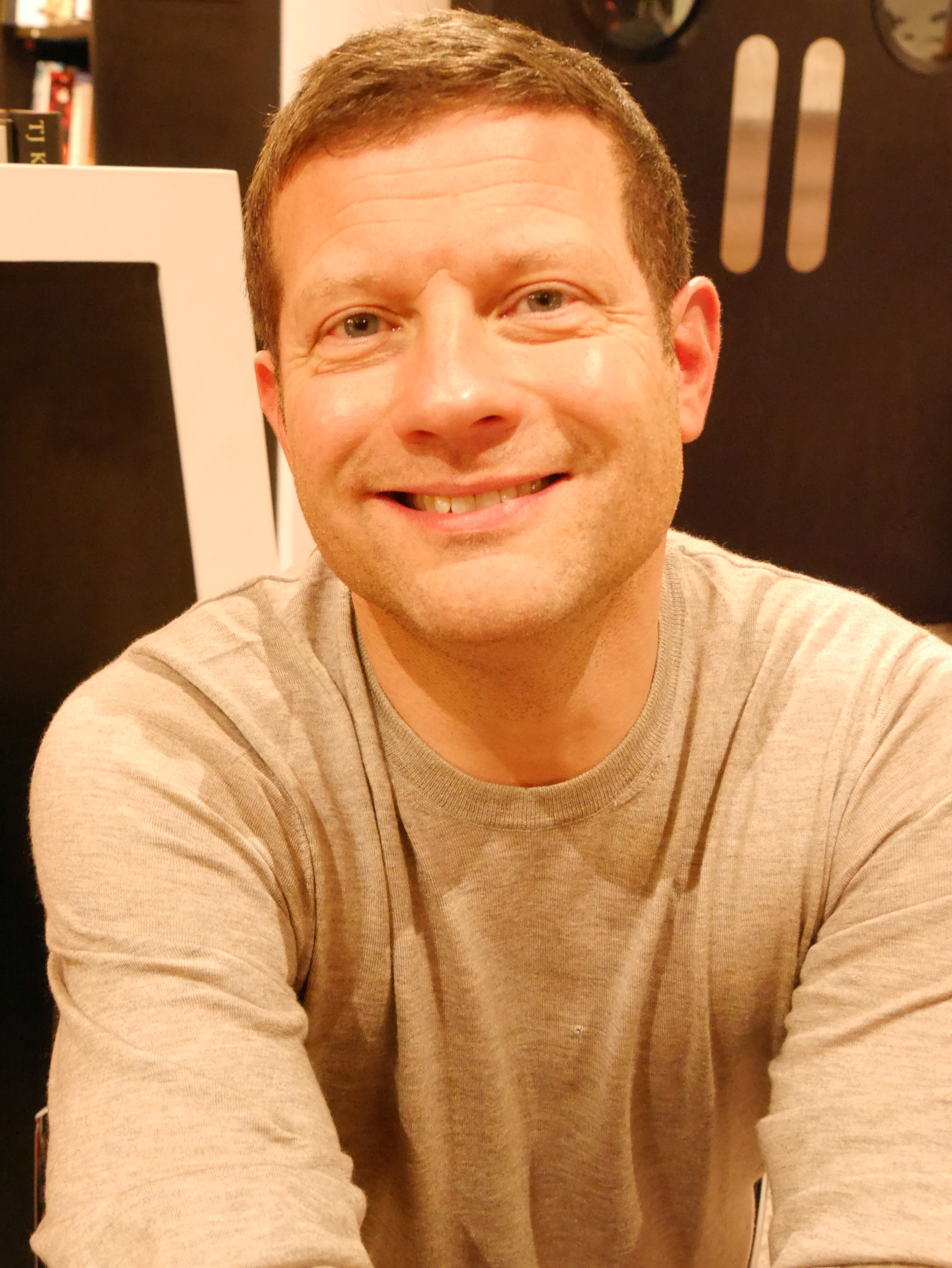
Dermot O'Leary (ITV1)

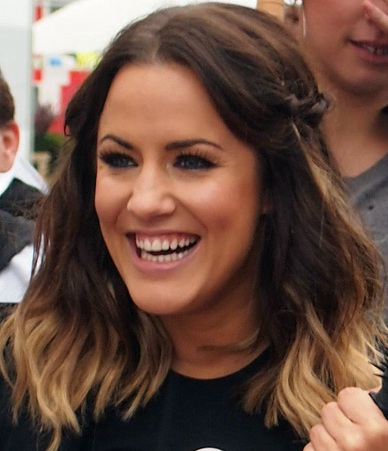
Caroline Flack (ITV2)

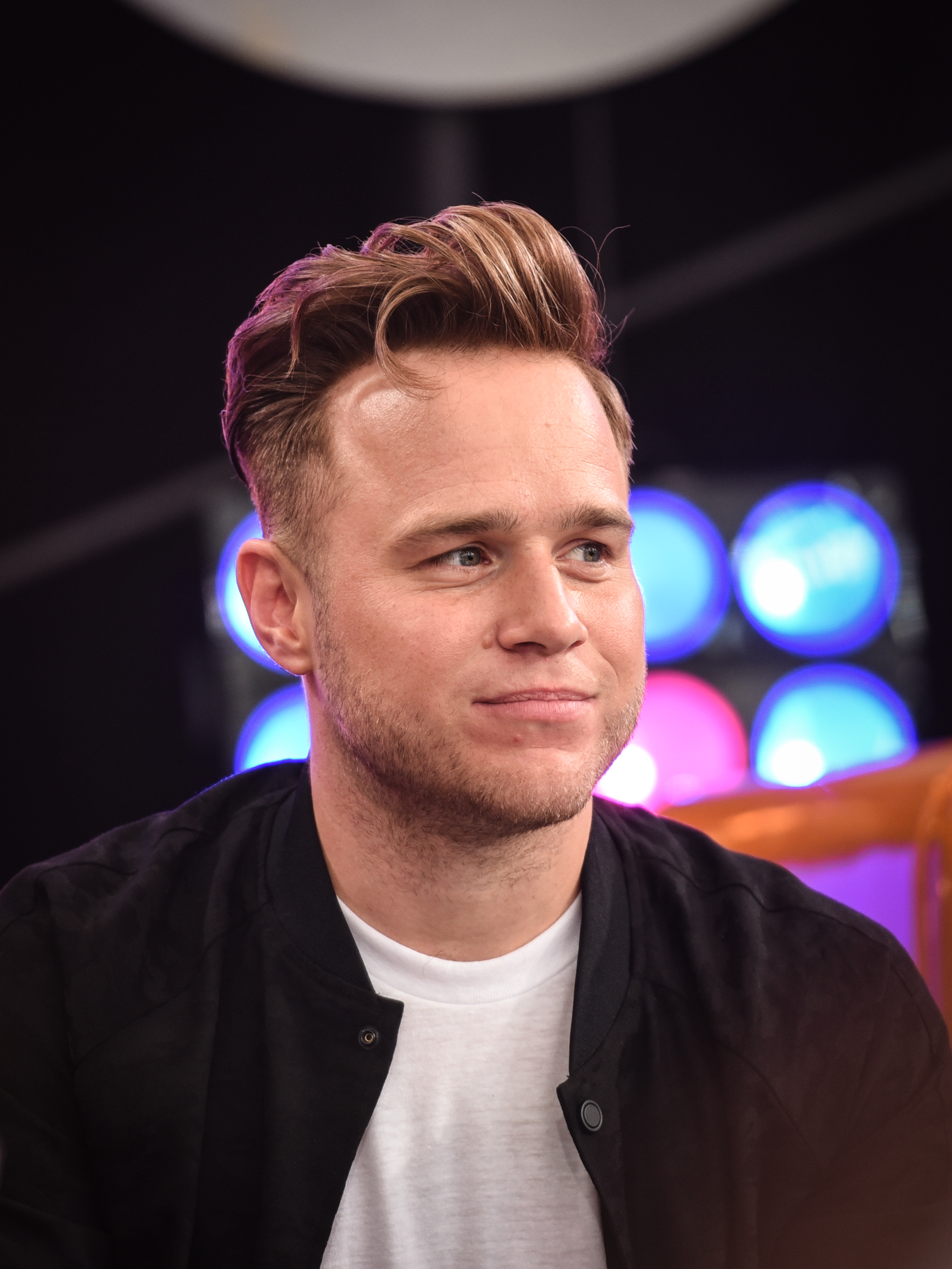
Olly Murs (ITV2, Live Shows Only)

On 17 April 2012, Gary Barlow was confirmed to be returning to the judging panel, and on 3 May it was announced that Louis Walsh would also return for his ninth year as a judge. Tulisa was also confirmed to be returning, but Kelly Rowland did not return due to other commitments. However, Rowland transferred to the USA show where she would become a judge to replace L.A. Reid for the 2013 USA season. Individuals rumoured to be permanently replacing Rowland included Alesha Dixon, and Rochelle Wiseman and Frankie Sandford. Former judge, Dannii Minogue,, as well as Katy Perry and Rihanna, were said to have declined the role. As a fourth permanent judge was not confirmed in time for the start of the auditions, guest judging roles were brought in. They were filled by Halliwell, series 3 winner Leona Lewis, Rita Ora, former judge and Over 30s runner-up mentor of The X Factor USA, Nicole Scherzinger, judge of The X Factor Australia, Mel B and Anastacia. Scherzinger was announced as the fourth permanent judge on 15 June 2012, filling the fourth chair from the Newcastle auditions onwards. During bootcamp, Scherzinger and Barlow swapped seats.

Dermot O'Leary returned to present the main show on ITV for his sixth series, while Caroline Flack and Olly Murs returned to co-present companion show The Xtra Factor on ITV2, but Murs was absent for the auditions, bootcamp and judges' houses as he was on tour with One Direction in America. In Murs' absence, Flack was joined by guest presenters such as Jedward, JLS and Westlife. Brian Burke returned as creative director, but Elizabeth Honan did not. Brian Friedman, who left as creative director on the show after series 7 in 2010, returned this year, but left after the third live show to work on the live shows of the 2012 season of the USA show. Also, Natalya Nair, head of make-up, did not have her contract renewed. Yvie Burnett and Annabel Williams gave vocal coaching during the live shows. This was the final series for Tulisa as a main judge; she left after this series, but reappeared in 2014 to assist Walsh in choosing his groups during judges' houses in series 11, then once more as a guest judge during the final.

== Selection process ==
=== Applications and auditions ===
Cities that auditions were held in.

This series, for the first time, applicants were able to audition online via Facebook. The show's producers also sent a "mobile audition van" to 18 locations throughout the UK and Ireland to audition singers who could not make the arena auditions. The mobile auditions began in Plymouth and ended 18 days later in Brighton. The van visited a different location every day except when it spent two days in Dublin on 28 and 29 April. The other towns and cities it visited were Aberystwyth, Bangor, Blackpool, Carlisle, Edinburgh, Inverness, Aberdeen, Dundee, Middlesbrough, Wakefield, Derby, Norwich, Colchester, Southend-on-Sea and Chatham. Producers also had researchers invite certain people to audition, who had not applied to audition. There were several rule changes in relation to the auditions: acts with current management deals were allowed to audition for the first time, in a bid to "[broaden] the net and [open] it up so that everybody gets an opportunity." Also, singers could perform their own compositions and play instruments.

The judges' auditions—originally supposed to start in Cardiff on 15 May 2012 but postponed due to delays in signing up a new permanent fourth judge—began on 23 May in Liverpool (Echo Arena) and continued from 26 to 30 May in London (The O_{2} Arena). From 5–7 June, auditions moved to Manchester (EventCity), and on 11 June, they took place in Glasgow (SEC Centre). Further auditions took place on 18 June in Newcastle (Metro Radio Arena) and concluded on 25 June in Cardiff (Motorpoint Arena Cardiff).

Halliwell was the first guest judge, attending the Liverpool auditions. Guest judges in London were Lewis, Ora, and Scherzinger. Mel B filled the guest judging role in Manchester and Anastacia judged in Glasgow. On 13 June, Scherzinger was announced to be returning as a guest judge for the Newcastle auditions, before being announced as the new permanent fourth judge two days later.

The first episode of auditions was broadcast on 18 August 2012, and featured auditions from London (with Scherzinger), Cardiff and Manchester. The second episode featured auditions from London (with Ora), Manchester and Newcastle. More Manchester auditions, along with those from Glasgow, were shown on 1 September, while The Xtra Factor additionally included auditions from Newcastle. The episode broadcast on 8 September included auditions from Liverpool and more from Manchester, with the corresponding episode of The Xtra Factor featured auditions from London (with Scherzinger). 9 September episode showcased auditions from London (with Lewis and Scherzinger), and The Xtra Factor featured more auditions from London (with Lewis and Scherzinger). On 15 September, auditions from London (with Ora and Lewis), Manchester and Glasgow were shown. The final episode of auditions was shown on 16 September, and included more of London (with Ora), Cardiff, Liverpool and Manchester.

Notable auditionees included Lucy Spraggan, whose self-released single "Last Night", which she performed at her audition, entered the UK Singles Chart at number 11 following the episode broadcast; Britt Love from the band Mini Viva; glamour model and television personality Bianca Gascoigne; TV presenter, stage actor and former Popstars and Pop Idol contestant Hayley Evetts; Big Brother 9 housemate Stephanie McMichael (in the group Poisonous Twin) and singer and former Big Brother: Celebrity Hijack housemate Nathan Fagan-Gayle. Returning auditionees included Joe Cox, Jade Richards, Melanie McCabe and Carolynne Poole, who all reached judges' houses in series 8.

Summary of auditions
Date(s)	City	Venue	Judge(s)			
23 May 2012	Liverpool	Echo Arena	Geri Halliwell	Gary Barlow	Tulisa	Louis Walsh
26 May 2012	London	The O_{2} Arena	Leona Lewis	Gary Barlow	Tulisa	Louis Walsh
28 May 2012	London	The O_{2} Arena	Rita Ora	Gary Barlow	Tulisa	Louis Walsh
29 May 2012	London	The O_{2} Arena	Rita Ora (Morning)	Gary Barlow	Tulisa	Louis Walsh
29 May 2012	London	The O_{2} Arena	Leona Lewis (Evening)	Gary Barlow	Tulisa	Louis Walsh
30 May 2012	London	The O_{2} Arena	Nicole Scherzinger	Gary Barlow	Tulisa	Louis Walsh
5–7 June 2012	Manchester	EventCity	Mel B	Gary Barlow	Tulisa	Louis Walsh
11 June 2012	Glasgow	SEC Centre	Anastacia	Gary Barlow	Tulisa	Louis Walsh
18 June 2012	Newcastle	Metro Radio Arena	Nicole Scherzinger	Gary Barlow	Tulisa	Louis Walsh
25 June 2012	Cardiff	Motorpoint Arena Cardiff	Nicole Scherzinger	Gary Barlow	Tulisa	Louis Walsh

=== Bootcamp ===
Bootcamp was held outside London for the first time in the show's history, due to London hosting the 2012 Summer Olympics. It took place at the Echo Arena in Liverpool over three days, starting on Thursday 19 July, and was broadcast on 22 and 23 September. Simon Cowell promised that this bootcamp would be "the toughest yet". The age ranges of the categories were changed for this series during bootcamp; the over 25s became the over 28s (as in series 7), so the boys and girls categories contain contestants aged 16–27, rather than 16–24. It was reported that the reason for this was because the series 8 contestants were considered too young, and contestants in their late 20s did not make it into the over 25s category because of "quirky older" contestants.

211 acts reached bootcamp. On the first day, judges reviewed the audition tapes and sent home 60 acts before they had a chance to sing. The remaining contestants were then put into groups and they took part in a sing-off. Contestants had a choice of the following songs to perform: "Stronger (What Doesn't Kill You)", "Respect", "Moves like Jagger", "Are You Gonna Go My Way", "Crazy in Love", "Next to Me", "She Said", "Use Somebody" and "How to Save a Life". After each performance, the judges decided which acts to keep and which to eliminate. The number of acts was reduced to 70: 21 girls, 22 boys, 12 over 28s and 15 groups. The following day, the remaining acts each performed one song for the judges in front of a live audience, and the day after, the judges decided which acts to put through to judges' houses. They could not decide between groups Triple J and GMD3, so had them each perform again before making a final decision. GMD3 were eventually chosen as the final group through to judges' houses and Triple J were sent home.

=== Judges' houses and wildcards ===
The judges received news of their categories from Simon Cowell via telephone, seen during the second bootcamp episode on 23 September. Scherzinger mentored the Boys in Dubai, assisted by R&B star Ne-Yo; Tulisa took the Girls to Saint Lucia with Tinie Tempah, Barlow had the Over 28s in Northamptonshire, and Walsh had the Groups in Las Vegas and original judge Sharon Osbourne returned as his assistant. Barlow was reportedly originally planning to go to Majorca, but changed to Boughton House in Northamptonshire so that he could be close to his wife after the stillbirth of their baby. Barlow was rumoured to be joined by Robbie Williams, but was instead joined by former judge Cheryl Cole. Her arrival was surrounded in secrecy; contestants had their phones removed and Cole was hidden under a tablecloth, so that contestants could not see her sitting next to Barlow.

Rough Copy were originally put through to judges' houses, but were withdrawn from the contest after getting through bootcamp because group member Kazeem "Kaz" Ajobo had a visa application which was being considered by the UK Border Agency. There had been fears that if he travelled abroad during the judges' houses stage, the Nigerian-born 23-year-old from South London may struggle to re-enter the UK. They were replaced by Times Red and Union J (originally Triple J). The judges' houses round was broadcast on 29 and 30 September 2012.

Judges Houses Performances

- Act in bold advanced

Boys:

- **James: "I Can't Make You Love Me"**
- **Jahmene: "Titanium"**
- **Rylan: "We Found Love"**
- Adam: "SOS"
- Nathan: "Beautiful Monster"
- Jake: "Back for Good"

Girls:

- **Ella: "I Won't Give Up"**
- **Jade E: "Stand by Me"**
- **Lucy: "I Will Always Love You"**
- Amy: "Read All About It, Pt. III"
- Leanne: "Hurt"
- Jade C: "It Must Have Been Love"

Groups:

- Times Red: "Ain't No Sunshine"/ "Let's Get It Started"
- **Union J: "Call Me Maybe"**
- **MK1: "Just Be Good to Me"**
- Duke: "The Way You Make Me Feel"
- Poisonous Twin: "Freak like Me"
- Mitsotu: "Hey Ya!"
- **District3: "Bless the Broken Road"**

Over 28s:

- **Christopher: "All Out of Love" (wildcard)**
- **Kye: "Payphone"**
- **Melanie: "Every Time You Go Away"**
- Brad: "The Final Countdown"
- Nicola Marie: "Tragedy"
- **Carolynne: "When You Say Nothing at All"**

Key:

– Wildcard winner

Summary of judges' houses
Judge	Category	Location	Assistant	Acts Eliminated	Wildcards
Barlow	Over 28s	Boughton House, Northamptonshire	Cheryl Cole	Nicola Marie, Brad Shackleton	Christopher Maloney
Tulisa	Girls	Saint Lucia	Tinie Tempah	Jade Collins, Leanne Robinson	Amy Mottram
Scherzinger	Boys	Dubai	Ne-Yo	Nathan Fagan-Gayle, Jake Quickenden	Adam Burridge
Walsh	Groups	Las Vegas	Sharon Osbourne	Duke, Mitsotu, Poisonous Twin	Times Red

At the end of judges' houses, it was announced that each judge could bring back one further act back as a wildcard. The public then voted for which of the four wildcards would become the thirteenth act This left one judge with an extra act. Scherzinger chose Adam Burridge, Tulisa chose Amy Mottram, Barlow chose Christopher Maloney and Walsh chose Times Red. Maloney was revealed as the winner on the first live show on 6 October 2012. When the voting statistics were announced at the end of the series, Maloney was revealed to have received 63.5% of the vote to return, while Mottram received 17.8%, Times Red received 12.5% and Burridge received 6.2%.

== Acts ==
The acts were announced during the episode broadcast on 30 September 2012. The winner of the wildcard vote was revealed on the first live show on 6 October 2012 as Christopher Maloney. The group GMD3 decided to change their name before the live shows, with viewers able to suggest names, and on 5 October, the day before the first live show, they announced their new name, District3.

Key:

– Winner
– Runner-Up
– Withdrew
– Wildcard (Live Shows)

Act	Age(s)	Hometown	Category (mentor)	Result
James Arthur	24	Saltburn-by-the-Sea	Boys (Scherzinger)	Winner
Jahméne Douglas	21	Swindon	Boys (Scherzinger)	Runner-Up
Christopher Maloney	34	Liverpool	Over 28s (Barlow)	3rd Place
Union J	19–24	Various	Groups (Walsh)	4th Place
Rylan Clark	24	Stepney	Boys (Scherzinger)	5th Place
Ella Henderson	16	Grimsby	Girls (Tulisa)	6th Place
District3	18–19	Various	Groups (Walsh)	7th Place
Kye Sones	30	Hammersmith	Over 28s (Barlow)	8th Place
Lucy Spraggan	21	Buxton	Girls (Tulisa)	9th Place
Jade Ellis	25	Charlton	Girls (Tulisa)	10th Place
MK1	20–25	Hackney	Groups (Walsh)	11th Place
Melanie Masson	44	Cathcart	Over 28s (Barlow)	12th Place
Carolynne Poole	32	Huddersfield	Over 28s (Barlow)	13th Place

== Live shows ==
The live shows started on 6 October 2012. Each week, the contestants perform on Saturday, with the voting lines opening before the performances for the first time in the history of the show. The results are announced on Sunday, with the bottom two contestants being announced and then judges choosing which of the two to eliminate after the contestants perform another song of their choice (the final showdown). If the judges' votes are tied, the result goes to deadlock and the act with the fewest public votes is eliminated. As with previous series, each live show has a different theme. The results show features a group performance by the remaining contestants and guest live performances. The live final took place in Manchester on 8 and 9 December, at Manchester Central. It is the first time the final has been hosted outside London. On 26 August, it was reported that contestants would be able to perform their own material during the live shows, after original songs proved to be popular with the crowds during the audition stages.

Each results show featured musical performances from at least two artists, while occasionally, artists performed on the main performances show. Leona Lewis and Ne-Yo performed on the first results show, while series 7 runner-up Rebecca Ferguson and Taylor Swift appeared on the second. The third results show featured Labrinth with Emeli Sandé and series 5 runners-up JLS. fun. and Robbie Williams performed the following week, and Rita Ora and No Doubt both performed in the fifth week. The sixth week included performances from series 7 contestants One Direction, Ed Sheeran and series 8 winners Little Mix. Alicia Keys and The Xtra Factor presenter and series 6 runner-up Olly Murs performed during the seventh live result show, while Rihanna and Bruno Mars performed on the eighth. The semi-final results show featured performances from Pink and judge Tulisa, who was due to perform the previous week, but due to the delay of the release of her new single, postponed her performance. The live final featured performances from Kylie Minogue, Ora and Kelly Clarkson, and the final three performed duets with their mentors, with Only Boys Aloud appearing during Douglas and Scherzinger's, while the final results show featured performances from One Direction, Sandé and Rihanna. In 2025, Ella Henderson revealed that she would’ve duetted with Adele during the final on her track Someone Like You whilst Rylan Clark revealed his planned duet partner was Minogue and their planned song was On a Night Like This.

=== Results summary ===
Colour key

Act in Boys

Act in Girls

Act in Over 25s

Act in Groups

–	Act did not face the public vote
–	Act was in the bottom two and had to sing again in the final showdown
–	Act received the fewest public votes and was immediately eliminated (no final showdown)
–	Act who withdrew from the competition
–	Act received the most public votes
–	Act was given a "Bye Week" and automatically advanced to the following week

Weekly results per act
Act	Week 1^{1}		Week 2	Week 3	Week 4	Week 5	Week 6	Week 7	Quarter-Final	Semi-Final	Final	
Act	Wildcard Vote	Elimination Vote	Week 2	Week 3	Week 4	Week 5	Week 6	Week 7	Quarter-Final	Semi-Final	Saturday Vote	Sunday Vote
James Arthur	—N/a^{1}	6th 5.6%	6th 7.4%	6th 7.4%	3rd 12.0%	6th 7.7%	3rd 14.0%	5th 13.7%	1st 40.7%	1st 41.2%	1st 51.7%	Winner; 53.7%^{4}
Jahméne Douglas	—N/a^{1}	2nd 13.2%	2nd 11.4%	2nd 15.6%	2nd 15.4%	2nd 16.9%	2nd 14.9%	2nd 17.4%	3rd 18.1%	2nd 22.0%	2nd 31.5%	Runner-Up; 38.9%^{4}
Christopher Maloney	1st 63.5%	1st 28.8%	1st 21.9%	1st 22.6%	1st 24.7%	1st 27.6%	1st 23.6%	1st 26.4%	2nd 21.0%	3rd 18.7%	3rd 16.8%	Eliminated (final)
Union J	—N/a^{1}	4th 7.3%	7th 7.1%	8th 5.9%	8th 6.3%	4th 10.4%	6th 11.7%	4th 14.7%	4th 11.8%	4th 18.1%	Eliminated (semi-final)	
Rylan Clark	—N/a^{1}	12th 3.1%	3rd 10.2%	4th 8.8%	7th 7.2%	7th 7.2%	5th 12.4%	3rd 15.7%	5th 8.4%	Eliminated (quarter-final)		
Ella Henderson	—N/a^{1}	3rd 13.1%	4th 9.5%	3rd 10.2%	6th 8.2%	5th 8.8%	4th 13.0%	6th 12.1%	Eliminated (week 7)			
District3	—N/a^{1}	8th 4.0%	11th 4.7%	5th 8.4%	4th 10.0%	3rd 14.7%	7th 10.4%	Eliminated (week 6)				
Kye Sones	—N/a^{1}	7th 4.1%	8th 5.3%	10th 4.9%	5th 10.0%	8th 6.7%	Eliminated (week 5)					
Lucy Spraggan	—N/a^{1}	5th 7.3%	5th 7.6%	7th 6.5%	Bye Week^{2}	Withdrew (week 5)						
Jade Ellis	—N/a^{1}	9th 4.0%	9th 5.2%	9th 5.1%	9th 6.2%	Eliminated (week 4)						
MK1	—N/a^{1}	10th 3.4%	10th 5.1%	11th 4.6%	Eliminated (week 3)							
Melanie Masson	—N/a^{1}	11th 3.2%	12th 4.6%	Eliminated (week 2)								
Carolynne Poole	—N/a^{1}	13th 2.9%	Eliminated (week 1)									
Amy Mottram	2nd 17.8%	Not Returned (week 1)										
Times Red	3rd 12.5%	Not Returned (week 1)										
Adam Burridge	4th 6.2%	Not Returned (week 1)										
Final Showdown	—N/a^{1}	Clark, Poole	District3, Masson	MK1, Sones	Ellis, Union J	Clark, Sones	District3, Union J	Arthur, Henderson	Clark, Union J	No final showdown or judges' votes; results were based on public votes alone		
Walsh's vote to eliminate (Groups)	—N/a^{1}	Poole	Masson	Sones	Ellis	Clark	None (abstained)	Arthur	Clark	No final showdown or judges' votes; results were based on public votes alone		
Tulisa's vote to eliminate (Girls)	—N/a^{1}	Clark	Masson	Sones	Union J	Sones	—N/a^{3}	Arthur	Clark	No final showdown or judges' votes; results were based on public votes alone		
Barlow's vote to eliminate (Over 28s)	—N/a^{1}	Clark	District3	MK1	Ellis	Clark	District3	Henderson	Clark	No final showdown or judges' votes; results were based on public votes alone		
Scherzinger's vote to eliminate (Boys)	—N/a^{1}	Poole	District3	MK1	Ellis	Sones	District3	Henderson	Union J	No final showdown or judges' votes; results were based on public votes alone		
Eliminated	—N/a^{1}	Carolynne Poole; 2 of 4 votes Deadlock	Melanie Masson; 2 of 4 votes Deadlock	MK1; 2 of 4 votes Deadlock	Jade Ellis; 3 of 4 votes Majority	Kye Sones; 2 of 4 votes Deadlock	District3; 2 of 2 votes Majority	Ella Henderson; 2 of 4 votes Deadlock	Rylan Clark; 3 of 4 votes Majority	Union J 18.1% to save	Christopher Maloney; 16.8% to save	Jahméne Douglas; 38.9% to win
Reference(s)												

- ^1 At the end of judges' houses, it was announced that each judge could bring back one further act back as a wildcard. One of the four wildcards chosen by the judges who were eliminated during the judges' houses (Adam Burridge, Christopher Maloney, Amy Mottram and Times Red) returned to the competition following a public vote. The winner of the vote was announced as Christopher Maloney with 63.5%.
- ^2 Spraggan was given a bye week for week 4 as she was too ill to perform. She withdrew during week 5.
- ^3 Tulisa was not required to vote as there was already a majority. However, she stated that she would have voted to send home Union J.
- ^4 The voting percentages in the final for the Sunday Vote do not add up to 100%, owing to the freezing of votes. Christopher Maloney received 7.4% of the final vote.

=== Live show details ===
==== Week 1 (6/7 October) ====
- Theme: Songs inspired by the Olympic Games (billed as "heroes night")
- Special guests: Olympians Laura Trott, Lizzie Armitstead, Danielle King, Joanna Rowsell, Nicola Adams, Luke Campbell, Jade Jones, Tom James, Pete Reed, Alex Gregory and Charlotte Dujardin appeared as guests in the audience, and One Direction made a brief guest appearance on Saturday's show, being interviewed by O'Leary after the first performance and giving advice to the contestants.
- Group performance: "Read All About It (Pt. III)"
- Musical guests: Leona Lewis ("Trouble") and Ne-Yo ("Let Me Love You (Until You Learn to Love Yourself)")

The result of the wildcard vote was revealed before the performances, with Christopher Maloney announced as the winner.

Acts' performances on the first live show
Act	Category (mentor)	Order	Song	Result
District3	Groups (Walsh)	1	"The Best"	Safe
James Arthur	Boys (Scherzinger)	2	"Stronger (What Doesn't Kill You)"	Safe
Melanie Masson	Over 28s (Barlow)	3	"With a Little Help from My Friends"	Safe
Lucy Spraggan	Girls (Tulisa)	4	"Mountains" (original song)	Safe
MK1	Groups (Walsh)	5	"Champion"/"Every 1's a Winner"	Safe
Christopher Maloney	Over 28s (Barlow)	6	"Hero"	Safe (Highest Votes)
Union J	Groups (Walsh)	7	"Don't Stop Me Now"	Safe
Jade Ellis	Girls (Tulisa)	8	"Hero"	Safe
Rylan Clark	Boys (Scherzinger)	9	"Gold"	Bottom Two
Kye Sones	Over 28s (Barlow)	10	"Man in the Mirror"	Safe
Ella Henderson	Girls (Tulisa)	11	"Rule the World"	Safe
Carolynne Poole	Over 28s (Barlow)	12	"Starships"	Bottom Two
Jahméne Douglas	Boys (Scherzinger)	13	"Imagine"	Safe
Final showdown details
Rylan Clark	Boys (Scherzinger)	1	"One Night Only"	Saved
Carolynne Poole	Over 28s (Barlow)	2	"There You'll Be"	Eliminated

Judges' votes to eliminate

- Scherzinger: Carolynne Poole – backed her own act, Rylan Clark, stating that she "believe[s] in him".
- Barlow: Rylan Clark – backed his own act, Carolynne Poole, stating that the decision was "easy".
- Tulisa: Rylan Clark – based on the final showdown performances; but stated that she loved Rylan "with all her heart".
- Walsh: Carolynne Poole – said that he loved both acts, and said he wanted to "keep Carolynne", but when O'Leary asked him if that meant he was sending home Clark, he said he wanted to save them both and then sent the result to deadlock. He took 2 minutes to vote as his decision was extremely hard.

With the acts in the bottom two receiving two votes each, the result went to deadlock and reverted to the earlier public vote. Poole was eliminated as the act with the fewest public votes; upon this revelation, Barlow immediately stormed off the stage.

==== Week 2 (13/14 October) ====
- Theme: "Love and heartbreak"
- Group performance: "Somebody That I Used to Know"
- Musical guests: Rebecca Ferguson ("Backtrack") and Taylor Swift ("We Are Never Ever Getting Back Together")
- Best bits song: "You've Got the Love"

Acts' performances on the second live show
Act	Category (mentor)	Order	Song	Result
Jahméne Douglas	Boys (Scherzinger)	1	"Tears Dry on Their Own"/"Ain't No Mountain High Enough"	Safe
Christopher Maloney	Over 28s (Barlow)	2	"Alone"	Safe (Highest Votes)
Union J	Groups (Walsh)	3	"Bleeding Love"/"Broken Strings"	Safe
Ella Henderson	Girls (Tulisa)	4	"Lovin' You"	Safe
James Arthur	Boys (Scherzinger)	5	"No More Drama"	Safe
Lucy Spraggan	Girls (Tulisa)	6	"Gold Digger"	Safe
District3	Groups (Walsh)	7	"I Swear"	Bottom Two
Jade Ellis	Girls (Tulisa)	8	"Love Is a Losing Game"	Safe
MK1	Groups (Walsh)	9	"I Want You Back"	Safe
Kye Sones	Over 28s (Barlow)	10	"Love the Way You Lie (Part II)"/"Thank You"	Safe
Rylan Clark	Boys (Scherzinger)	11	"Back for Good"/"Groove Is in the Heart"/"Gangnam Style"/"Pump Up the Jam"	Safe
Melanie Masson	Over 28s (Barlow)	12	"Never Tear Us Apart"	Bottom Two
Final showdown details
District3	Groups (Walsh)	1	"(Everything I Do) I Do It for You"	Saved
Melanie Masson	Over 28s (Barlow)	2	"Stay with Me"	Eliminated

Judges' votes to eliminate

- Walsh: Melanie Masson – backed his own act, District3, but said that he loved Masson "an awful lot".
- Tulisa: Melanie Masson – stated her heart was with District3.
- Barlow: District3 – backed his own act, Melanie Masson.
- Scherzinger: District3 – felt Masson's final showdown performance showed that she waited her whole life for a record deal opportunity as she was the oldest contestant.

With the acts in the bottom two receiving two votes each, the result went to deadlock and reverted to the earlier public vote. Masson was eliminated as the act with the fewest public votes.

==== Week 3 (20/21 October) ====
- Theme: Club classics
- Group performance: "Ain't Nobody"
- Musical guests: Labrinth featuring Emeli Sandé ("Beneath Your Beautiful") and JLS ("Hottest Girl in the World")
- Best bits song: "Breathe Me"

Acts' performances on the third live show
Act	Category (mentor)	Order	Song	Result
Christopher Maloney	Over 28s (Barlow)	1	"Waiting for a Star to Fall"	Safe (Highest Votes)
MK1	Groups (Walsh)	2	"Gypsy Woman (She's Homeless)"/"Pass Out"	Bottom Two
Jahméne Douglas	Boys (Scherzinger)	3	"I Say a Little Prayer"	Safe
Jade Ellis	Girls (Tulisa)	4	"Free"	Safe
James Arthur	Boys (Scherzinger)	5	"Sexy and I Know It"	Safe
Union J	Groups (Walsh)	6	"When Love Takes Over"	Safe
Rylan Clark	Boys (Scherzinger)	7	"On the Floor"/"Don't Stop the Music"/"I See You Baby"	Safe
Lucy Spraggan	Girls (Tulisa)	8	"Titanium"	Safe
Kye Sones	Over 28s (Barlow)	9	"Save the World"	Bottom Two
District3	Groups (Walsh)	10	"Beggin'"/"Turn Up the Music"	Safe
Ella Henderson	Girls (Tulisa)	11	"You Got the Love"	Safe
Final showdown details
MK1	Groups (Walsh)	1	"The Man Who Can't Be Moved"	Eliminated
Kye Sones	Over 28s (Barlow)	2	"I Can't Make You Love Me"	Saved

Judges' votes to eliminate

- Walsh: Kye Sones – backed his own act, MK1, saying he did not want to lose them.
- Barlow: MK1 – backed his own act, Kye Sones, whom he said was the reason he wanted the Over 28s category.
- Scherzinger: MK1 – based on the final showdown performances.
- Tulisa: Kye Sones – felt she had a better connection with MK1 due to their similarity to her own band N-Dubz and that MK1 were needed for the competition.

With the acts in the bottom two receiving two votes each, the result went to deadlock and reverted to the earlier public vote. MK1 were eliminated as the act with the fewest public votes.

==== Week 4 (27/28 October) ====
- Theme: Halloween
- Guest mentor: Robbie Williams gave advice to some contestants during rehearsals
- Group performance: "Without You"
- Musical guests: Fun. ("We Are Young") and Robbie Williams ("Candy")
- Best bits song: "Skyscraper"

Acts' performances on the fourth live show
Act	Category (mentor)	Order	Song	Result
Kye Sones	Over 28s (Barlow)	1	"Let Me Entertain You"	Safe
Union J	Groups (Walsh)	2	"Sweet Dreams"	Bottom Two
Rylan Clark	Boys (Scherzinger)	3	"Toxic"/"Horny"/"Poison"	Safe
Ella Henderson	Girls (Tulisa)	4	"Bring Me to Life"	Safe
Christopher Maloney	Over 28s (Barlow)	5	"(I Just) Died in Your Arms"	Safe (Highest Votes)
District3	Groups (Walsh)	6	"Every Breath You Take"/"Beautiful Monster"	Safe
Jahméne Douglas	Boys (Scherzinger)	7	"Killing Me Softly"	Safe
Jade Ellis	Girls (Tulisa)	8	"Freak like Me"	Bottom Two
James Arthur	Boys (Scherzinger)	9	"Sweet Dreams (Are Made of This)"	Safe
Lucy Spraggan	Girls (Tulisa)	Did Not Perform	Bye Week^{1}	Automatically Advanced
Final showdown details
Union J	Groups (Walsh)	1	"Perfect"	Saved
Jade Ellis	Girls (Tulisa)	2	"White Flag"	Eliminated

^1Lucy Spraggan did not perform as she was not well and automatically advanced to the following week. It was the second time this happened in the show's history, with Diana Vickers being the first in series 5.

Judges' votes to eliminate

- Walsh: Jade Ellis – backed his own act, Union J.
- Tulisa: Union J – backed her own act, Jade Ellis.
- Scherzinger: Jade Ellis – thought that Union J had been better performers overall.
- Barlow: Jade Ellis – wondered if she had the desire to succeed in the competition, and stated he was excited about where Union J could go in the future.

==== Week 5 (3/4 November) ====
- Theme: Number-ones
- Guest mentors: Gwen Stefani and Tony Kanal from No Doubt gave advice to some contestants during rehearsals
- Group performance: "Good Time"
- Musical guests: Rita Ora ("Shine Ya Light") and No Doubt ("Looking Hot")
- Best bits song: "One Day Like This"

On 3 November 2012, it was announced that Spraggan withdrew from the competition due to illness. She was not replaced and the competition went ahead as normal.

Acts' performances on the fifth live show
Act	Category (mentor)	Order	Song	Result
Rylan Clark	Boys (Scherzinger)	1	"Hung Up"/"Gimme! Gimme! Gimme! (A Man After Midnight)"	Bottom Two
Union J	Groups (Walsh)	2	"Love Story"	Safe
Kye Sones	Over 28s (Barlow)	3	"You Get What You Give"	Bottom Two
James Arthur	Boys (Scherzinger)	4	"Don't Speak"	Safe
Ella Henderson	Girls (Tulisa)	5	"Firework"	Safe
District3	Groups (Walsh)	6	"Dynamite"	Safe
Jahméne Douglas	Boys (Scherzinger)	7	"Listen"	Safe
Christopher Maloney	Over 28s (Barlow)	8	"All by Myself"	Safe (Highest Votes)
Final showdown details
Rylan Clark	Boys (Scherzinger)	1	"Kissing You"	Saved
Kye Sones	Over 28s (Barlow)	2	"I Won't Give Up"	Eliminated

Judges' votes to eliminate

- Scherzinger: Kye Sones – backed her own act, Rylan Clark.
- Barlow: Rylan Clark – backed his own act, Kye Sones, who he said was better in the final showdown.
- Walsh: Rylan Clark – stated he was doing "the right thing".
- Tulisa: Kye Sones – stated she looked forward to seeing Clark more and went with her heart.

With the acts in the bottom two receiving two votes each, the result went to deadlock and reverted to the earlier public vote. Sones was eliminated as the act with the fewest public votes.

==== Week 6 (10/11 November) ====
- Theme: Best of British
- Group performance: "Beautiful Day"
- Musical guests:
  - Saturday: One Direction ("Little Things")
  - Sunday: Little Mix ("DNA") and Ed Sheeran ("Give Me Love")
- Best bits song: "Said It All"

Acts' performances on the sixth live show
Act	Category (mentor)	Order	Song	British Artist	Result
Christopher Maloney	Over 28s (Barlow)	1	"I'm Still Standing"	Elton John	Safe (Highest Votes)
Jahméne Douglas	Boys (Scherzinger)	2	"Angels"	Robbie Williams	Safe
District3	Groups (Walsh)	3	"Tears in Heaven"	Eric Clapton	Bottom Two
Ella Henderson	Girls (Tulisa)	4	"Written in the Stars"	Tinie Tempah	Safe
Rylan Clark	Boys (Scherzinger)	5	"Say You'll Be There"/"Who Do You Think You Are"/"Wannabe"/"Spice Up Your Life"	Spice Girls	Safe
Union J	Groups (Walsh)	6	"Fix You"	Coldplay	Bottom Two
James Arthur	Boys (Scherzinger)	7	"Hometown Glory"	Adele	Safe
Final showdown details
District3	Groups (Walsh)	1	"Just the Way You Are"		Eliminated
Union J	Groups (Walsh)	2	"Set Fire to the Rain"		Saved

Judges' votes to eliminate

- Walsh abstained from voting as both acts were in his category.
- Barlow: District3 – based on the final showdown performances, adding that he felt that Union J wanted their place in the competition more.
- Scherzinger: District3 – felt that Union J were more mature and had more chance of long-term success.
- Tulisa was not required to vote since there was already a majority, but confirmed she would have voted to send home Union J due to her sharing a deep connection with District3.

==== Week 7 (17/18 November) ====
- Theme: Guilty pleasures
- Group performance: "Young"
- Musical guests: Olly Murs ("Troublemaker") and Alicia Keys ("Girl on Fire")
- Best bits song: "Read All About It"

Acts' performances on the seventh live show
Act	Category (mentor)	Order	Song	Guilty Pleasure	Result
Union J	Groups (Walsh)	1	"Call Me Maybe"	Carly Rae Jepsen	Safe
Ella Henderson	Girls (Tulisa)	2	"You're the One That I Want"	Olivia Newton-John & John Travolta	Bottom Two
James Arthur	Boys (Scherzinger)	3	"Can't Take My Eyes Off You"	Frankie Valli	Bottom Two
Rylan Clark	Boys (Scherzinger)	4	"Girls on Film"/"When Will I Be Famous?"	Duran Duran / Bros	Safe
Christopher Maloney	Over 28s (Barlow)	5	"Total Eclipse of the Heart"	Bonnie Tyler	Safe (Highest Votes)
Jahméne Douglas	Boys (Scherzinger)	6	"Don't Leave Me This Way"	Thelma Houston	Safe
Final showdown details
Ella Henderson	Girls (Tulisa)	1	"If You're Not the One"		Eliminated
James Arthur	Boys (Scherzinger)	2	"Fallin'"		Saved

Judges' votes to eliminate

- Tulisa: James Arthur – backed her own act, Ella Henderson, though she was angered by the public vote since both acts were in the bottom two.
- Scherzinger: Ella Henderson – backed her own act, James Arthur, but also stated that both acts in the bottom two was "a great tragedy".
- Walsh: James Arthur – gave no reason, though said that Arthur was a "ready-made" recording artist and Henderson had more potential; he later stated on The Xtra Factor that he voted strategically so that if Arthur was voted out, he could instantly land a record deal while Henderson could continue to advance on the show.
- Barlow: Ella Henderson – said he had "been right behind" Arthur from the very beginning.

With the acts in the bottom two receiving two votes each, the result went to deadlock and reverted to the earlier public vote. Henderson was eliminated as the act with the fewest public votes.

==== Week 8: Quarter-Final (24/25 November) ====
- Themes: Songs by ABBA; Motown songs
- Group performance: "Viva la Vida"
- Musical guests: Bruno Mars ("Locked Out of Heaven") and Rihanna ("Diamonds")
- Best bits song: "We Found Love"

For the first time this series, each act performed two songs.

Acts' performances in the quarter-final
Act	Category (mentor)	Order	ABBA Song	Order	Motown Song	Motown Artist	Result
Rylan Clark	Boys (Scherzinger)	1	"Mamma Mia"	7	"Baby Love"/"Stop! In the Name of Love"/"You Keep Me Hangin' On"	The Supremes	Bottom Two
Union J	Groups (Walsh)	2	"The Winner Takes It All"	6	"I'll Be There"	The Jackson 5	Bottom Two
Jahméne Douglas	Boys (Scherzinger)	3	"I Have a Dream"	9	"The Tracks of My Tears"	The Miracles	Safe
James Arthur	Boys (Scherzinger)	4	"SOS"	8	"Let's Get It On"	Marvin Gaye	Safe (Highest Votes)
Christopher Maloney	Over 28s (Barlow)	5	"Fernando"	10	"Dancing on the Ceiling"	Lionel Richie	Safe
Final showdown details
Rylan Clark	Boys (Scherzinger)	1	"Wires"				Eliminated
Union J	Groups (Walsh)	2	"Run"				Saved

Judges' votes to eliminate

- Scherzinger: Union J – backed her own act, Rylan Clark.
- Walsh: Rylan Clark – based on the final showdown performance and backed his own act, Union J.
- Barlow: Rylan Clark – gave no specific reason, but despite their feud praised Clark for "the best vocals so far" and for his resilience, entertainment factor and tolerance.
- Tulisa: Rylan Clark – felt Union J had more potential to sell records.

==== Week 9: Semi-Final (1/2 December) ====
- Themes: Songs for someone special (billed as "songs for you"); "songs to get you to the final" (no theme)
- Group performance: "Merry Christmas Baby" (with Rod Stewart)
- Musical guests: Tulisa ("Sight of You") and Pink ("Try")
- Best bits song: "Safe"

Acts' performances in the semi-final
Act	Category (mentor)	Order	First song	Order	Second song	Result
Christopher Maloney	Over 28s (Barlow)	1	"You Raise Me Up"	6	"Haven't Met You Yet"	Safe
Jahméne Douglas	Boys (Scherzinger)	2	"I Look to You"	5	"At Last"	Safe
Union J	Groups (Walsh)	3	"Beneath Your Beautiful"	7	"I'm Already There"	Eliminated
James Arthur	Boys (Scherzinger)	4	"One"	8	"The Power of Love"	Safe (Highest Votes)

The semi-final did not feature a final showdown and instead the act with the fewest public votes, Union J, were automatically eliminated. After their elimination, Union J reprised their week 5 performance of "Love Story".

==== Week 10: Final (8/9 December) ====
The final, held at Manchester Central, consisted of two one hour thirty minute episodes on 8 and 9 December.

8 December

- Themes: No theme; mentor duets
- Group performance: "Gangnam Style" / "Payphone" / "Titanium" / "Spectrum (Say My Name)" / "Read All About It, Pt. III" (all contestants except MK1)
- Musical guests: Kelly Clarkson ("Breakaway"), Rita Ora ("RIP" / "How We Do (Party)") and Kylie Minogue ("Can't Get You Out of My Head")

Acts' performances on the Saturday Final
Act	Category (mentor)	Order	First song	Order	Second song (Duet)	Result
Jahméne Douglas	Boys (Scherzinger)	1	"Move On Up"	4	"The Greatest Love of All" (with Nicole Scherzinger featuring Only Boys Aloud)	Safe
Christopher Maloney	Over 28s (Barlow)	2	"Flashdance... What a Feeling"	5	"Rule the World" (with Gary Barlow)	Eliminated
James Arthur	Boys (Scherzinger)	3	"Feeling Good"	6	"Make You Feel My Love" (with Nicole Scherzinger)	Safe (Highest Votes)

9 December

- Themes: Favourite performance ("song of the series"); winner's single
- Group performance: "I Wish It Could Be Christmas Everyday" / "All I Want for Christmas Is You"/ "Last Christmas" / "Santa Claus Is Coming to Town" (all contestants except Christopher Maloney, MK1 and Lucy Spraggan)
- Musical guests: One Direction ("Kiss You"), Emeli Sandé ("Clown") and Rihanna ("Stay" / "We Found Love")

Acts' performances on the Sunday Final
Act	Category (mentor)	Order	First song	Order	Second song	Result
Jahméne Douglas	Boys (Scherzinger)	1	"Angels"	3	"Let It Be"	Runner-Up
James Arthur	Boys (Scherzinger)	2	"Let's Get It On"	4	"Impossible"	Winner

== Winner's single ==
On 31 October 2012, it was reported that there would not be a charity single released by the finalists this year, as there was in the previous four years, and that the winner's single may be released for charity to give it a greater chance of reaching number one. This was confirmed by Simon Cowell on 28 November, who announced that the single would be released on 9 December and that 100% of the profits would go to children's charity Together for Short Lives. The winners' songs were revealed on 8 December 2012, with Arthur to release "Impossible" as his debut single. If he had won, Douglas would have released "Let It Be", while Christopher Maloney's winner's song would have been "The Reason", and Union J's would have been "Skyscraper". Ella Henderson and Rylan Clark revealed in a 2025 podcast interview that their winner singles would’ve been cover's of "Forever" (which was later released by 2015 winner Louisa Johnson) and "I Wanna Dance with Somebody".

== Reception ==
=== Ratings ===
This series' launch was the lowest-rated launch episode of the show since series 3, seen by 8.09 million viewers according to overnight figures, a 39.4% share of the total viewing audience at the time, on ITV1 between 8 pm and 9.15 pm and 616,000 (2.9%) on ITV1+1. It peaked with 9.2 million in the last half-hour. The average figure of 8.1 million was down 2.7 million from the previous year. The following week, the ratings increased to an average of 8.4 million, but by the fourth episode, the ratings had dropped to an overnight average of 7.7 million, 2.9 million fewer than the previous year. The fifth episode was the first broadcast on a Sunday, and ratings were still down from the previous year, though The X Factor was the most watched programme on any channel on both days. The following week, Strictly Come Dancing was launched on BBC One, and although the shows did not directly clash, The X Factor had more viewers based on average overnight figures, though Strictly Come Dancing had a higher peak rating of 9.8 million compared to The X Factor's 9.5 million. The next day, The X Factor also received more viewers than the first episode in the third series of Downton Abbey. The two bootcamp episodes performed similarly to the previous week, though the Sunday night episode received 400,000 fewer viewers than the previous week. The episode in which the final 12 contestants were revealed was watched by an overnight average of 9.46 million viewers, and was beaten by Downton Abbey for the first time.

When the live shows started, Strictly Come Dancing also started its live shows, and beat The X Factor in the ratings, according to overnight figures. The first live results show was more successful, with overnight ratings of 9.42 million, peaking at 11 million, though it was still beaten by Downton Abbey. The X Factor's second live show, on 13 October, received the same ratings as the previous week, and was again beaten by Strictly Come Dancing, reported as "its most convincing victory over The X Factor in six years". The next week, Strictly Come Dancing's lead on The X Factor increased, with The X Factor's peak rating of 9.3 million being less than Strictly Come Dancing's average rating of 9.91 million. The next day, The X Factor was beaten by Strictly Come Dancing for the first time on a Sunday, as well as Downton Abbey, though The X Factor had a higher peak rating than Strictly Come Dancing. By the fifth live show, ratings had dropped to an average of 7.6 million, the fifth Saturday in a row where The X Factor was beaten in the ratings by Strictly Come Dancing. It was reported that the ratings were the lowest for a fifth live show of The X Factor since series 1 in 2004. While Strictly Come Dancing continued to beat The X Factor on Saturday nights, The X Factor always beat it on Sundays, but continued to be beaten by Downton Abbey, based on overnight figures.

By the sixth live show, Strictly Come Dancing was more than 2 million viewers ahead of The X Factor, and the launch of the twelfth series of I'm a Celebrity...Get Me Out of Here!. While 8.8 million watched the sixth live results show, 10.3 million tuned in to watch I'm a Celebrity..., meaning that it beat The X Factor in the ratings battle for the first time since 2006. The seventh live show saw I'm a Celebrity... beat The X Factor again, with Strictly Come Dancing again being the most watched Saturday night programme, but the controversial live results show the following night, which saw Ella Henderson eliminated after ending up in the bottom two with James Arthur, produced 9.44 million for The X Factor. I'm a Celebrity... was again the highest rated show of the Sunday night, while Strictly Come Dancing just came up on top of The X Factor by a margin of less than 500,000, though The X Factor's peak of nearly 11 million was higher than Strictly Come Dancing's peak of 10.4 million. The final result received the lowest viewing figures for a final in seven years. It was beaten by Strictly Come Dancing, which was two weeks away from its final, getting 2 million more viewers than The X Factor's 10.04 million.

Summary of episode ratings
Episode	Air date	Official ITV1 rating (millions)	Weekly rank ^{1}	Share (%)	Official ITV1 HD rating (millions)	Official ITV1+1 rating (millions)	Total ITV1 viewers (millions)
Auditions 1	18 August	8.08	1	39.4	1.02	0.68	9.78
Auditions 2	25 August	8.57	1	36.1	1.05	0.51	10.13
Auditions 3	1 September	8.39	1	35.0	0.97	0.44	9.80
Auditions 4	8 September	8.03	1	33.9	0.95	0.52	9.50
Auditions 5	9 September	7.50	2	30.2	1.06	0.51	9.07
Auditions 6	15 September	8.70	3	39.5	1.03	0.58	10.31
Auditions 7	16 September	9.08	2	36.4	1.10	0.43	10.61
Bootcamp 1	22 September	9.52	3	34.9	0.94	0.44	10.90
Bootcamp 2	23 September	9.76	2	33.6	1.21	0.50	11.47
Judges' houses 1	29 September	8.44	3	35.9	1.28	0.49	10.21
Judges' houses 2	30 September	9.35	2	35.4	1.21	0.41	10.97
Live show 1	6 October	8.61	3	33.9	1.19	0.40	10.20
Live results 1	7 October	9.09	2	31.9	1.11	—N/a^{2}	10.20
Live show 2	13 October	8.47	3	36.2	1.34	0.35	10.16
Live results 2	14 October	8.83	4	35.3	1.20	—N/a^{2}	10.03
Live show 3	20 October	8.25	6	34.8	1.05	0.40	9.70
Live results 3	21 October	8.83	3	34.7	1.02	0.32	10.17
Live show 4	27 October	8.23	5	34.8	1.11	0.34	9.68
Live results 4	28 October	8.51	3	33.6	1.03	0.34	9.89
Live show 5	3 November	7.63	7	32.3	1.12	0.38	9.13
Live results 5	4 November	8.29	5	33.2	1.20	0.27	9.76
Live show 6	10 November	7.97	4	33.7	1.22	0.31	9.50
Live results 6	11 November	8.25	5	33.3	1.06	—N/a^{2}	9.31
Live show 7	17 November	7.89	11	33.8	1.06	—N/a^{2}	8.95
Live results 7	18 November	8.91	8	33.3	1.03	—N/a^{2}	9.94
Live show 8	24 November	7.65	12	33.1	1.04	—N/a^{2}	8.69
Live results 8	25 November	8.37	10	34.0	1.20	—N/a^{2}	9.57
Live show 9	1 December	7.40	13	32.3	1.06	—N/a^{2}	8.46
Live results 9	2 December	8.22	11	32.0	1.06	0.29	9.57
Live final	8 December	8.78	4	38.4	1.41	0.22	10.41
Live final results	9 December	10.04	2	39.1	1.46	—N/a^{2}	11.50
Series average		8.50	—N/a	—N/a	1.12	0.42	9.92

^{1} The rank for the ITV1 broadcast, compared with all channels for that week, from Monday to Sunday.
^{2} The ITV+1 figure for this episode is unavailable as it was outside the top 10 programmes of the week on BARB.
^{3} The average figure for ITV+1 includes only the episodes with figures available.

== Controversies ==
=== Trailer ===
On 30 July 2012, the trailer for the series premiered. Entitled "Whose Time Is Now?", it features six former The X Factor contestants—winners Lewis, Alexandra Burke and Little Mix, and runners-up JLS, Murs and One Direction—talking about their time on the show and how it changed their lives. Male winners Steve Brookstein, Shayne Ward, Leon Jackson, Joe McElderry and Matt Cardle were not included. Ward blasted this, calling the show "pathetic" for leaving him out and saying it was like he was "being erased slowly from their history." McElderry, who won in 2009, said "I'm just gonna keep doing my thing", which many fans believed to be prompted by the trailer. McElderry later admitted that he was not angry about not being included in the trailer. In an interview with the Daily Star Sunday, he said: "I'm not on Simon [Cowell]'s label so I wouldn't expect him to promote me. If they want to erase the fact I won [The] X Factor or try to hide it, I don't care. Personally I am proud I came from The X Factor. If [Cowell] doesn't feel the same then you'll have to ask him why."

=== Auditions ===
During the first auditions episode, broadcast on 18 August, one of the auditionees in Cardiff, Zoe Alexander, a Pink tribute singer, was accused of attempting to "smash" equipment after arguing with the judges. She sang "So What", but the judges then asked her to sing a second song, which was "Next to Me" by Emeli Sandé. After being given a "no" by the judges, she claimed that she was told to sing a Pink song, and threw down her microphone as she left the stage, with her father subsequently joining her. When her father brought her back on stage, she swore at the judges and Alexander angrily ran off the stage, pushing a cameraman. She then stormed backstage and in the broadcast appeared very aggressive and violent with both the judges and staff. This was later disputed heavily by Alexander as well as other participants in previous X Factor shows. This included accusations of significant manipulation at the hands of production. Executive producer with over four decades of work in television, Richard Holloway, said that every auditionee had a choice of five songs, adding: "All the contestants that go in front of the judges, they're all spoken to by the production team as they have to get all the tracks to play so the conversation takes place between them and us about what they want to sing and they go through their choices and the final decision about what they are going to sing when they walk on the stage is theirs, 100% theirs." Alexander complained to Ofcom; her complaint was not upheld. Holloway, who left his position in 2017, has maintained a stance that is in-keeping with the show's practices. Alexander, however, has come forward in 2020 with evidence to the contrary. In emails allegedly corresponding with X Factor production, the executives rejected her song selections and encouraged her to perform a song by the artist Pink. Alexander claims the show's decision to manipulate her image as a Pink copycat led to her infamous onstage breakdown and outrage. She has been very vocal regarding the dangerous mental health consequences suffered by those who participate on the X Factor programs. Alexander has also detailed that the public humiliation suffered at the hands of the show resulted in an eventual suicide attempt. Her claims have garnered a great deal of support within YouTube communities since the original airing in 2012.

Online criticism continues to draw attention to the show and its treatment of contestants like Alexander, and employees. In the same YouTube video, Alexander describes an email received from X Factor alumna Kitty Brucknell, in which Alexander alleges that Brucknell expressed threatening messages on behalf of Syco Entertainment. Brucknell has since gone on to publicly claim via Instagram Live that she is "terrified" of Simon Cowell. Continued negative allegations surrounding Syco's treatment of its artists support Alexander's claims of manipulation. While heavily covered at the time of its initial broadcast in 2012, Alexander's audition and resulting platform have contributed to mounting backlash against the show and her treatment as a contestant. This is especially evident among internet forums and social media communities.

Ofcom received 35 complaints about Alison Brunton's audition, in which she performed "The Edge of Glory", from people concerned about the impact on her two children, aged 14 and 16, who were watching from backstage. The broadcasting code states that under-18s must not be "caused unnecessary distress or anxiety by their involvement in programmes". O'Leary asked the children if they would be teased at school, to which Brunton's son said, "I'm never going to hear the end of this," though smiling at the time. An ITV spokeswoman said: "The X Factor does not include child contestants but takes the welfare of any children featured in the show very seriously. It is a well-established format and contestants regularly bring along their family to support them, as Alison did. Footage of family members is only used when appropriate consent has been obtained." Ofcom also received 34 complaints about the audition of Lorna Bliss, a Britney Spears impersonator who wore a body stocking, saying the programme may have broken guidelines on taste and decency. Bliss gave Walsh a lapdance and chased Barlow through the studio during her performance. The spokeswoman stated: "Lorna's performance and its editing was carefully considered by the producers and ITV. We do not believe her routine exceeded generally accepted standards or the expectations of the vast majority of the audience."

=== Lucy Spraggan ===
In week 4, Lucy Spraggan, who had previously been one of the favourites to win, was given a bye week automatically advanced to the following week due to illness. Some viewers felt it was unfair that she had been given "special treatment", especially as she had been on a string of "boozy nights" with fellow contestant Rylan Clark. Additionally, Jade Ellis, who was sent home that week, sang for survival despite a sore throat. A show source insisted that Spraggan had been in a far worse condition that any of the other contestants. The following week, Spraggan withdrew from the show.

In a 2023 interview, Spraggan revealed that her absence from week 4 and subsequent withdrawal had actually been the result of her being raped by a hotel staff member between the third and fourth weeks, with Spraggan accusing the production team of being unprepared to deal with an incident of such severity.

=== Christopher Maloney's absence from the Sunday Final ===
Maloney was allegedly excluded from the final group performance at the start of the live final results show on 9 December, due to being late for rehearsals, the fact that he "smelt of alcohol" and a fight that occurred between him and Carolynne Poole, during which he reportedly called her a "c**t". A spokesperson for The X Factor said: "Chris decided he no longer wanted to be part of the X Factor Final and has gone back to Liverpool." Writing on Twitter, Poole hinted at the dismay backstage, saying The X Factor "can also create monsters". Maloney responded by saying Poole was "disgraceful" and would "do anything to get a headline". He later tweeted the show and Barlow, saying, "[I] can't believe all the b******t yet again! [T]his is a witch hunt for [definite]. [T]he show is over", and claimed: "I am being bullied! [B]ig time." Maloney claimed he missed the group performance due to illness. MK1 & Lucy Spraggan were also not included in the final performance.

=== Judges' comments ===
During the second live show on 13 October, O'Leary apologised after Tulisa used the term MILF, referring to Melanie Masson's performance in an attempt to add humor to her compliment of Masson's delivery of the performance.

Barlow and Tulisa got into a spat after Maloney's performance during the fourth live show on 27 October. She criticised Barlow, Maloney's mentor, by saying, "Gary I have to ask you, how many of these [1980s] eighties classics are you going to let him keep destroying, honestly?". Without Barlow responding at that point, Tulisa further explained her frustration, "Every week he's getting the same critique of all of the judges it's always an issue. Why not change it up for him?". She continued, "I feel bad having to say the same thing to you each week. I don't think it's fair. You do the same thing over and over again with him it's not working". After Tulisa made her statement Barlow replied, "Tulisa, I don't know what's offended me more—what you've said or the fag ash breath." Tulisa retaliated to his insult by saying, "Just a note for Gary, seriously. Just a note for Gary, lay off the red wine because I can really smell that as well." Barlow later apologised for his comment and agreed that he had previously enjoyed the smell of cigarettes as he is a former smoker.

The seventh results show on 18 November attracted controversy when Scherzinger introduced Arthur for his survival performance by saying, "This is James effing Arthur!". As "effing" is an alternative way of saying the explicit word "fucking" and the show was broadcast before the watershed, Scherzinger later apologised on the following episode of The Xtra Factor: "I'm so sorry. You spend every day with these people, you spend so much time with them. Ella was the last female in the competition. I was passionate about her as well as James Arthur, who is one of the greatest human talents ever. I'm so sorry for my effing."

=== Voting ===
In the first live show, the voting lines opened before the contestants had performed, the first time this had happened in the history of the show. This was branded "money grabbing" by some viewers, and it was reported that the change to the rules could have affected the voting results, as the acts who performed first would get a "head start" in the votes. The two acts in the bottom two, Clark and Poole, had performed 9th and 12th respectively out of 13 acts. The acts performing 11th and 13th, Ella Henderson and Jahméne Douglas, were already among the favourites to win. ITV defended the change, stating it would allow viewers "to interact immediately with their favourite acts".

On 7 October, the first results show sparked major controversy when Poole was eliminated over Clark in the final showdown. First Scherzinger voted against Poole, then Barlow and Tulisa voted against Clark, which meant Walsh had the casting vote. His vote either meant that if he voted against Clark, Clark would be eliminated or if he voted against Poole, the result would go to deadlock, where the public vote would decide the result. Walsh appeared to change his mind while he was deliberating. When O'Leary asked him who he wanted to send home, Walsh deliberated for some time, before stating, "I'm going to go with Carolynne, I want to keep Carolynne.". O'Leary then asked him to clarify if his statement meant he was sending home Clark, to which Walsh responded by saying he wanted to save both Clark and Poole. O'Leary then reiterated that he needed Walsh to say who he was sending home. Walsh finally made his decision by saying, "I want to take it to deadlock!" which meant he voted against Poole. Following Walsh's decision to send the result to deadlock, O'Leary revealed that Poole had received the fewest public votes and she was voted out. Right after hearing O'Leary's revelation, Barlow, Poole's mentor, slammed his pen on the judges desk, then angrily stood up from his chair, stormed off stage, out of the studio, down the backstage corridor, and into his dressing room saying "this is a joke". Additionally, he refused to get up on stage to console Poole which is what happens when a judge loses their own act following their act's elimination during or at the conclusion of a result show. Barlow did return to the studio and consoled Poole on stage but not until a few seconds after The Xtra Factor started broadcasting. During Poole's final showdown performance, the public was also outraged when Holloway was seen approaching Walsh and whispering into his ear. This sparked rumours that Holloway told Walsh not to eliminate Clark, and that Walsh may have been conflicted as to whether to vote based on his own intentions or follow Holloway's instructions. On the episode of The Xtra Factor that followed, Barlow stated that he thought the result was "disgusting" that a talented singer had been voted out over a "joke act" who had "little talent". Several celebrities also vented their fury about the result on Twitter: Barlow's Take That bandmate Howard Donald said: "Joke decision on xfactor tonight kids. Based on the singing the wrong person was dropped from a great height. That's xfactor for you!", whilst Coleen Nolan stated: "I'm horrified!! What a joke and a total fix!!" Ofcom and ITV received more than 2,500 complaints over the events, and Ofcom said they may launch an inquiry. Holloway said in a statement: "We regularly chat to the judges during the show, they don't wear earpieces like Dermot so we have to speak to them on anything from timings to running order changes. On Sunday I was telling Louis the order the judges would vote in. We don't tell [the] judges how to vote."

On 6 November, it emerged that Maloney had been voting for himself throughout the live shows, something which he openly admitted. Maloney stated: "I have voted for myself a few times. So has everyone else—I doubt my calls have made much of a difference... If I had more credit on my phone I'd vote more." A member of production crew stated he had seen Maloney "dialling and redialling his own number over and over again." A member of production said, "You can't outlaw this sort of behaviour but it leaves a very sour taste. It's against the spirit of the show." During the VT before Maloney's performance in the live show following the reports, Maloney denied that he had been voting for himself.

The seventh results show on 18 November attracted controversy when Arthur and Henderson, who were both favourites to win the series, received the fewest public votes. This was especially shocking considering that both Clark and Union J had repeatedly been in the previous weeks' final showdown. The judges scolded the public for their votes when the time came to deciding that night's elimination, in which Henderson was eliminated after the result went to deadlock. Simon Cowell, the creator of the show, expressed his shock over the result on Twitter, whilst bookmakers Ladbrokes announced that odds for both Maloney to win outright and for the show to be axed by ITV were slashed.

=== Performances ===
Part of Clark's performance during the second live show was cut from repeats on ITV1+1 and recaps on ITV2, and the entire performance was removed from itv.com and YouTube for legal reasons, believed to be because he renamed the song "Gangnam Style" to "Rylan Style". An edited version of the performance was later put back on itv.com and YouTube.

After his performance of LMFAO's "Sexy and I Know It" on the third live show on 20 October, Arthur was accused of plagiarism. His rendition was very similar to that of YouTube star only1Noah, which was uploaded on 9 May 2012 and has since gathered over 19 million views. However, Arthur later tweeted: "Btw doesn't everyone know I was putting a spin on Noah's version? It had 13.something million hits! Was I supposed to state the obvious?"

=== Excessive promotion ===
In January 2013, Ofcom ruled that The X Factor had breached broadcasting rules by excessively promoting the hotel where the finalists stayed, saying it was mentioned in eight out of the 13 pre-recorded introduction videos for the finalists, including shots of them arriving featuring close-up shots of the hotel's sign. Ofcom found "the overall number of references to be excessive" and "therefore judged that there was insufficient editorial justification for the repeated references to the hotel during the programme." They concluded that "the cumulative effect of these references resulted in the programme as a whole giving undue prominence to the hotel."
