= Jah Screw =

Jamaican singer and record producer (b. 1955)

Paul Love, better known as Jah Screw (born in Greenwich Farm, Jamaica, 9 February 1955) is a Jamaican singer and record producer best known for his work in the 1980s and 1990s with artists such as Barrington Levy, Barry Brown, and Ranking Joe.

== Biography ==
Jah Screw started in the music business in the second half of the 1970s working as a selector on the Echo Vibration, Ray Symbolic, and (U-Roy's) King Stur-Gav Hi-Fi sound systems. By 1980, he had begun working as a record producer, initially working with his friend from sound system days, Ranking Joe, and they set up the Sharp Axe label together. The success from the label, with hots such as "Ice Cream Style" and the album Armageddon, was enough encouragement for Jah Screw to set up his own label, Time One Records.

He continued to produce Ranking Joe and also produced music for artists such as Earl 16, Tristan Palma, Dennis Brown and Barry Brown.

In 1984 he started laying rhythms in London. The version to the classic "African Beat" rhythm became the foundation for Barrington Levy's massive hit "Under Mi Sensi". Screw then produced the even more successful single "Here I Come" for Barrington, which reached number 41 in the UK Singles Chart in 1985. Levy moved on to work with Black Scorpio but returned to work with Jah Screw for several years. Jah Screw released his Harry J-produced album, Herb Base Function in 1986. Further collaborations from this era included Levy's Duets album, the 1991 reggae chart-topper "Dancehall Rock", with Levy joined by Cutty Ranks, and the 1996 hit "Living Dangerously". Ever since then Barrington and Jah Screw have had a fruitful relationship releasing music up in to the 90's with Jah Screw even turning his hand at producing Jungle remixes of Barrington's music.

Jah Screw has written, arranged, engineered and produced a lot of influential reggae music. He continued to be active as a producer until 1996, after which he said he "wasn't getting the vibes to do any more production". He has since been working on preserving his back-catalogue of productions.

== Credits ==
=== Writing ===
- King Tubby Meets Roots Radics - Dangerous Dub (1981)

=== Albums ===
- Jah Screw - Herb Base Function (1986)

=== Productions ===
- Barrington Levy - Here I Come (1985)
- Barry Brown - Right Now (198?)
- Earl Cunningham - John Tom (1984)
- Earl Sixteen - Super Duper (1982)
- King Tubby - King At The Control (1981)
- King Tubby Meets Roots Radics - Dangerous Dub (1981)
- Ranking Joe - Armageddon (1982)
- Ranking Joe - Armageddon Time (1982)
- Ranking Joe - Disco Skate (1981)
- Ranking Joe - Shaolin Temple (1980)
- Ranking Joe - Showcase (1981)
- Ranking Joe - Tribute To John Lennon (1981)
- Roots Radics Meets King Tubbys - More Dangerous Dub (1981)
- Tony Tuff - Reggae In The City (1981)
- Original Experience (1991)
- Jah Screw Presents Dancehall Glamity (1994)
