= Tulisa =

British singer (born 1988)

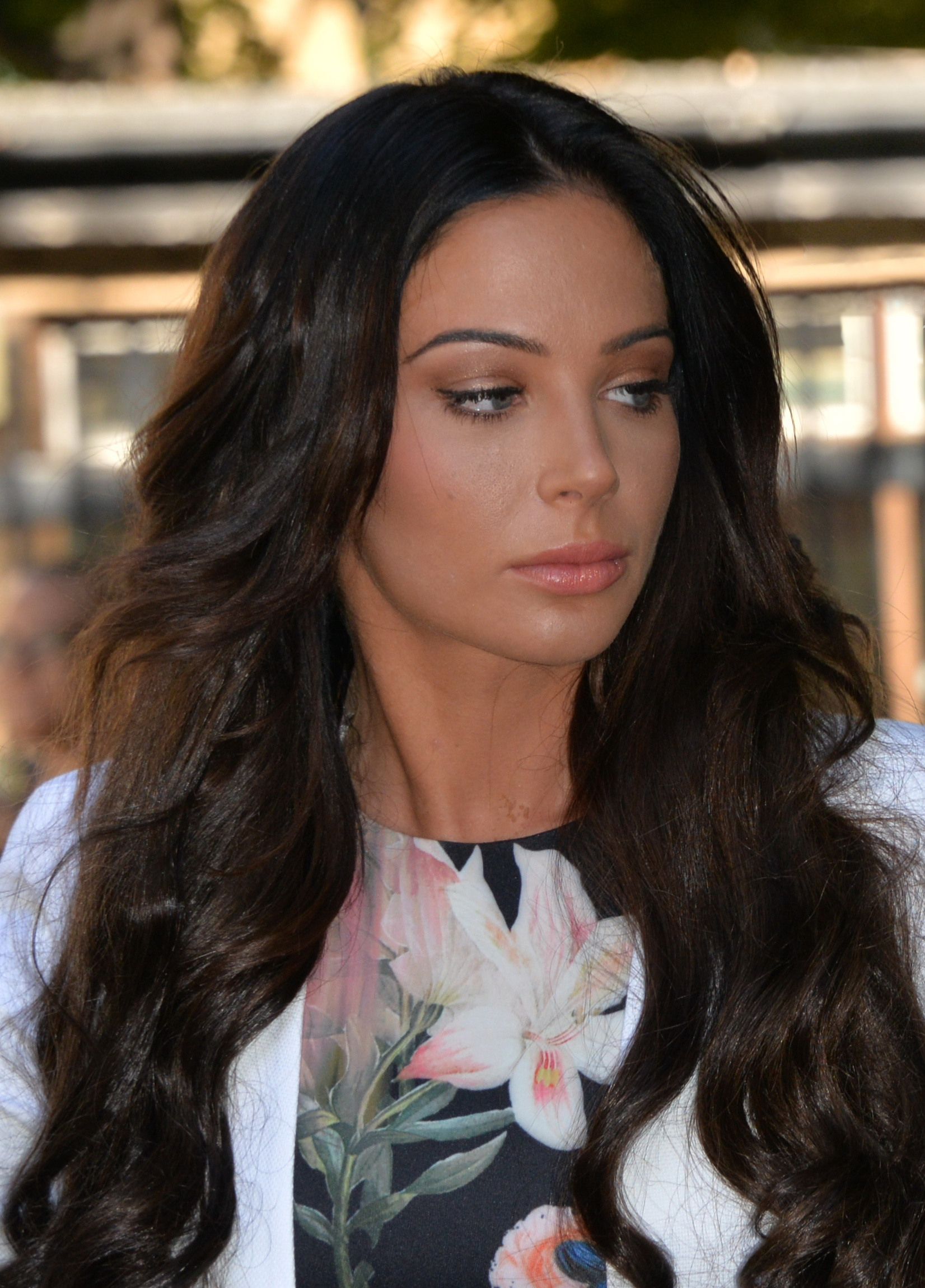
- Tulisa in 2014
- Born: Tula Paulinea Contostavlos; 13 July 1988 (age 38); Camden Town, London, England
- Occupations: Singer; songwriter; rapper; television personality; actress
- Relatives: Dappy (cousin)
- Musical career
- Genres: Pop; R&B
- Instrument: Vocals
- Years active: 2000–present
- Labels: Polydor; AATW; Island; Xploded
- Member of: N-Dubz

Tula Paulinea "Tulisa" Contostavlos (born 13 July 1988), known professionally as Tulisa, is an English singer, songwriter, rapper, and television personality. When she was part of the R&B/hip-hop group N-Dubz with her cousin Dappy and friend Fazer, they gained four platinum-certified albums, five MOBO awards, a Brit Award nomination, thirteen top 40 singles, six silver-certified singles, three gold-certified singles, two platinum-certified singles, and three Urban Music Awards.

From 2011 to 2012, Tulisa was a judge on the television talent show The X Factor UK. In 2012, she released her debut solo studio album, The Female Boss, which produced the UK number one single "Young", and the UK top-twenty singles "Live It Up" and "Sight of You". In 2024, Tulisa appeared as a contestant on the twenty-fourth series of the reality television show I'm a Celebrity...Get Me Out of Here!, finishing in tenth place. She released the memoir Judgement in 2025.

== Early life ==
Tulisa was born as Tula Paulinea Contostavlos on 13 July 1988 in Camden Town, London. Her Irish mother, Anne Byrne, was born in Churchtown, Dublin. Anne and her three sisters went on to form the 1980s big band and swing band Jeep. Tulisa's father, Plato Contostavlos, is Greek Cypriot and at one time was keyboardist with Mungo Jerry. Plato's brother, Byron Contostavlos, was bassist with Mungo Jerry and later became manager of N-Dubz.

When Tulisa was five, her mother, who has bipolar disorder and schizoaffective disorder, was sectioned under the Mental Health Act. The 2010 BBC programme, Tulisa: My Mum and Me, described Tulisa's life looking after her mother before joining N-Dubz. At age 14, with support from her uncle, Byron Contostavlos, she enrolled at Quintin Kynaston School in St John's Wood but later attended Haverstock Secondary School where she did not sit her GCSE examinations.

== Career ==
=== 2000–2011: Career beginnings with N-Dubz ===
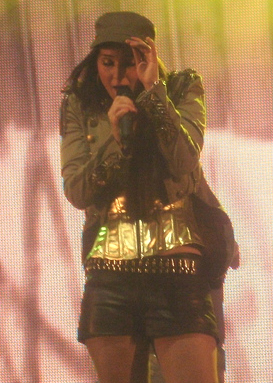
Tulisa during a concert with N-Dubz at Glastonbury Festival in June 2010

Dappy and Fazer, who had already started rapping together, decided they wanted a female voice in the group, which was called the Lickle Rinsers Crew at the time, and so invited Tulisa to be part of the group. They started performing together as a group around Camden from young ages. Performing as the Lickle Rinsers Crew, they released the singles "Bad Man Riddim" and "Life Is Getting Sicker by the Day", which became hits on pirate radio stations. After Lickle Rinsers Crew, they then became NW1, after the area they hail from, making their first music video in 2005 for the track "Everyday Of My Life", which received airplay on Channel U, recording more demos as NW1 such as "Don't Feel Like Moving", "Girl On Road" and "Livin Broke". Their first single to be released was "You Better Not Waste My Time", which was available for download only until their 2006 self-released single, "I Swear", which gained them their first mainstream notice. In 2007, the group appeared on the UK charts with "Feva Las Vegas" (also self-released), peaking at number 57.

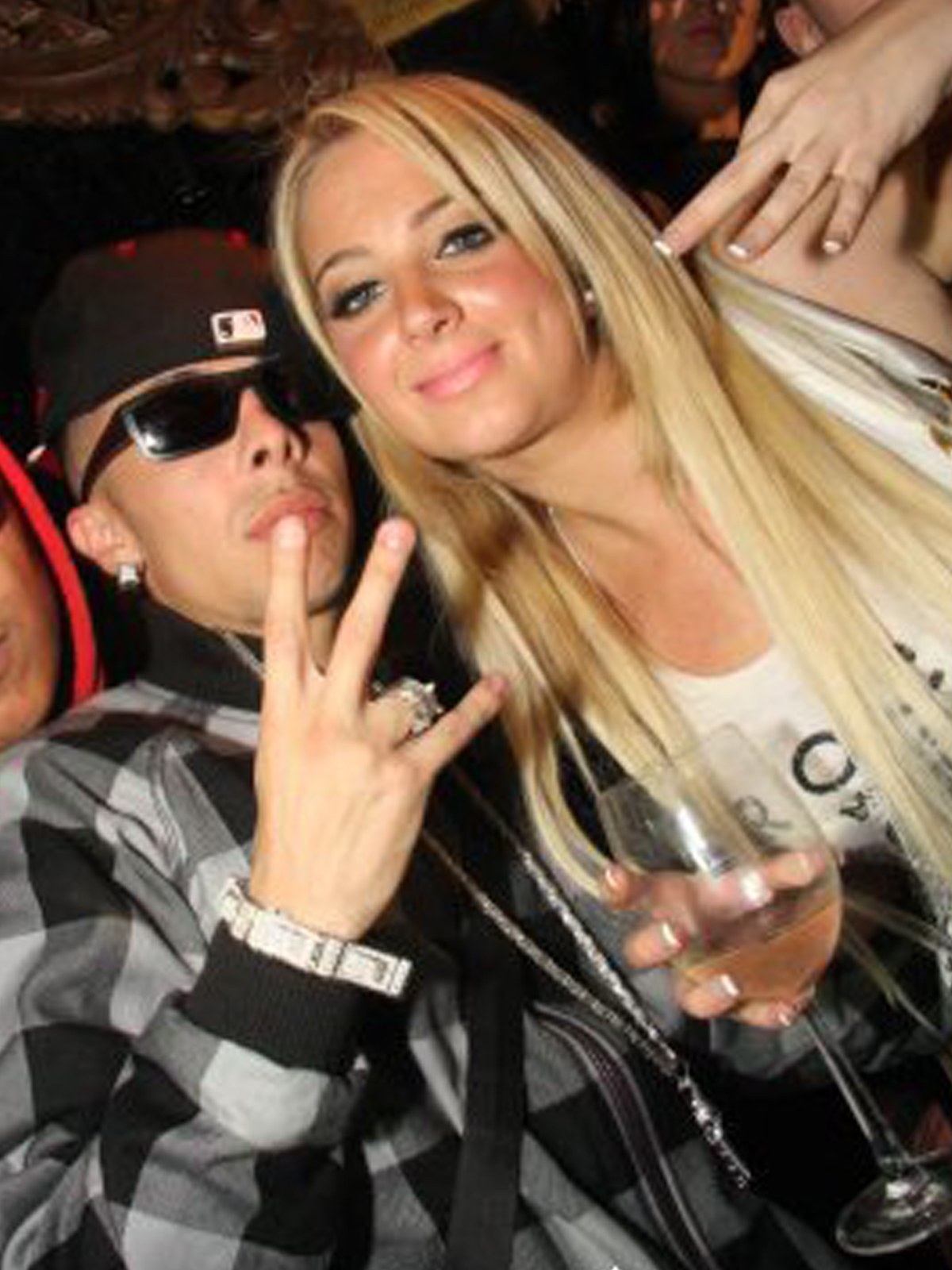
Tulisa with fellow N-Dubz member Dappy in 2012

On 6 August 2008, it was announced that the group had left Polydor Records and had signed to All Around the World records. The press release stated that the label would be releasing "Ouch" as the group's first single on the label in September 2008. The group's first album, Uncle B, was released on 17 November 2008. "Strong Again" was touted as the third single to be released from Uncle B and charted for five weeks in the UK Singles Chart, peaking highest at number 24. Due to the success of their debut album, the group embarked on their first headlining tour, Uncle B tour. The tour was supported by Stevie Hoang and Tinchy Stryder with whom N-Dubz collaborated on his number one single "Number 1". During one performance, Tulisa fainted on stage.

The lead single from the group's second album titled "I Need You" was released on 9 November 2009 and charted at number five in the UK. The album, Against All Odds, was released on 16 November 2009, and charted at number six in the UK Album Chart. It went platinum within approximately two months of release. The second single, "Playing with Fire", features R&B/pop musician, Mr Hudson, and reached number 15 in the UK charts on album downloads alone. In 2010, N-Dubz toured their album, Against All Odds, starting on 31 March and finishing on 20 April.

After much speculation, it was confirmed that US label Def Jam signed the group. The first release was N-Dubz's third studio album, Love.Live.Life. It was released in the UK on 29 November 2010. The group began recording the album following the success of Against All Odds. "We Dance On" was released on 20 May 2010, as the album's lead single. It peaked at number five in the UK. The song was also included on the soundtrack to the film Streetdance 3D. "Best Behaviour" was released on 17 October 2010 as the second single from the album. It peaked at number 10 in both the UK and Scotland and became a top 40 hit in Ireland. "Girls" was released as the album's third single on 12 December 2010. It reached number 19 in the UK.

N-Dubz parted ways with record label Def Jam in August 2011 due to creative differences. The band performed their final gig together in September, with Dappy releasing his solo single "No Regrets" soon after.

=== 2011–2012: The Female Boss and The X Factor ===
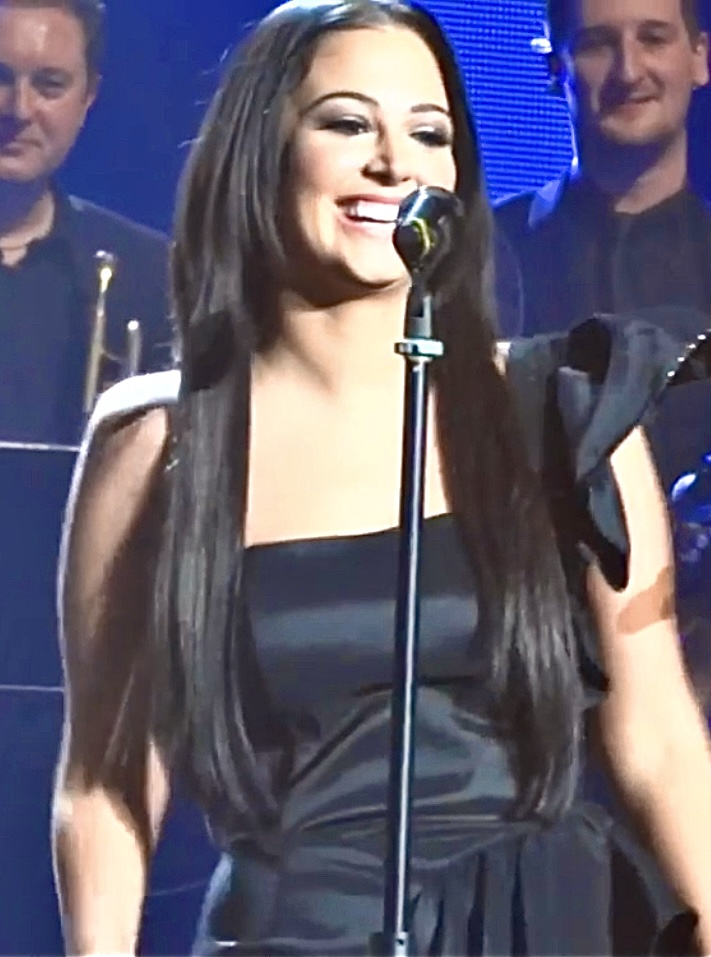
Tulisa performing on Text Santa, December 2012

In 2011, Tulisa replaced Cheryl Cole as a judge for the eighth series of The X Factor. Joining the show aged 23, Tulisa was and remained the youngest judge ever to be on the UK panel. In this series, Tulisa mentored the Groups category, which included 4-piece girlband Little Mix (formerly known as Rhythmix). Despite three of her four contestants being eliminated in the first five weeks of the competition, Little Mix went on to become the most successful girl group in X Factor history, avoiding the final showdown every week and eventually becoming the first band ever to win the competition. Tulisa returned for the ninth series in 2012. Tulisa mentored the "Girls", a category made up of female contestants aged 16–27, which included Lucy Spraggan and Ella Henderson. Contrary to her previous success in 2011, in this series, Tulisa became the first judge to lose all her contestants in the live shows, although Henderson did achieve a record deal and successful music career after leaving the competition. Tulisa did not join the tenth series of the show in 2013 and was replaced by original judge, Sharon Osbourne. Tulisa briefly returned to The X Factor for its eleventh series in 2014 as Louis Walsh's guest judge during the judges' houses stage of the competition, joining him in Bermuda. She also appeared on the first night of the series' final, temporarily filling in for Mel B who was ill.

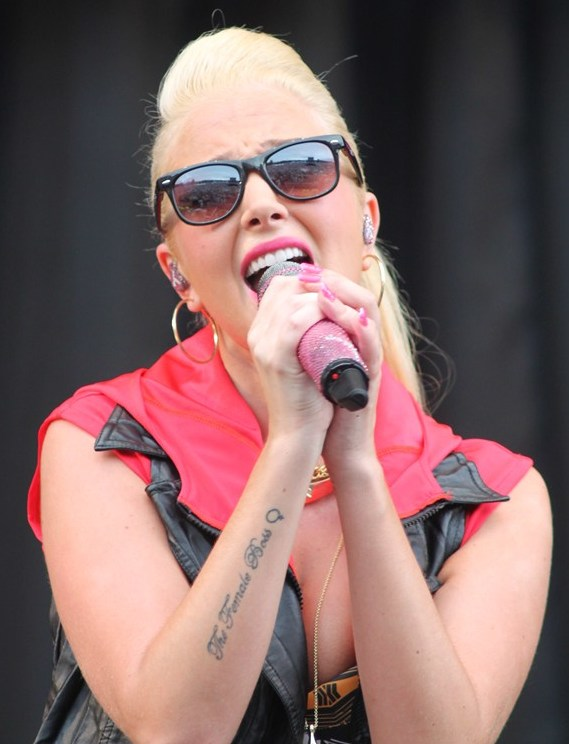
Tulisa at V Festival in 2012

Tulisa released her solo album, The Female Boss, on 3 December 2012, for which she began working on earlier that year. She described the album as having "a track for every mood," with songs meant for parties, big ballads and "UK urban music." The first single released from the album was "Young", released in April and accompanied by a promotional video filmed in Miami. The song charted at number five on the Irish Singles Chart and number one in the UK. September saw the release of the second single "Live It Up". The song debuted at number 11 in the UK. Around this time, Tulisa released an autobiography titled Honest: My Story So Far. Tulisa's third solo single "Sight of You" was released together with the album to mostly negative reviews and charted lower than expected at number 18. The album itself received negative reviews and charted at number 35. In January 2013, Tulisa stated that the album campaign had finished and that no further singles would be released.

Released in November 2012 Britney Spears and will.i.am's single "Scream & Shout" was originally co-written by Tulisa with Jean Baptiste and recorded under the title "I Don't Give a Fuck". The track was intended for Tulisa's debut album. However, the producer of the track, Lazy Jay, did not want Tulisa to have the song and gave it to will.i.am, who re-wrote the song with Spears in mind. The song became a hit, peaking at number one in the UK and number three in the US. Despite Tulisa's vocals still being heard on "Scream & Shout", she was not credited with co-writing the song upon its release, which prevented her from collecting any royalties. Tulisa filed a lawsuit against will.i.am and won in 2018, entitling her to 10% of publishing rights.

=== 2013–2022: Other projects and hiatus ===
Tulisa began working on a second album in 2013, and continued to record throughout 2014 The single, "Living Without You", was initially planned for release in December 2014, but was eventually released in January the next year. The single peaked at number 44 in the UK. That single was followed two years later by "Sweet Like Chocolate", which featured rapper Akelle.

In 2016, Tulisa signed with an agent in an attempt to begin a career as a film actress, and as of 2018, was committed to star as Sista C in the feature film Diva. She had earlier acted with roles such as the role of Laurissa, a cocaine addict who is in R&B group, in the television series Dubplate Drama (2007–09), Shaniqua in the straight-to-DVD British comedy, Big Fat Gypsy Gangster (2011), and Amber in the British slasher film Demons Never Die (2011).

In April 2019, Tulisa released her first single in three years, "Daddy", after signing to Xploded Records, which was founded by the co-founders of All Around the World. Another single, "Sippin'" was released two months later. In the same year, Tulisa performed at various gigs, including Manchester Pride.

=== 2022–present: N-Dubz return and autobiography ===
In 2022, Tulisa reunited with N-Dubz for new music and a tour. They released their fourth studio album, Timeless, in August 2023. In November 2024, Tulisa was confirmed as a contestant on the twenty-fourth series of I'm a Celebrity...Get Me Out of Here!, and was the third contestant to be eliminated, finishing in tenth place. In August 2025, Tulisa released an autobiography based on her career titled "Judgement". She performed at Manchester Pride in 2025 but focuses more on commercial activities and campaigning for more accountable press regulation.

== In the media ==
During her career, she has appeared on the cover of numerous lifestyle and fashion magazines such as UK's Glamour, Cosmopolitan, Company, Fabulous, FHM, Notebook, Stella and The Times magazine. Her first fragrance, "The Female Boss" was launched in October 2011, saying: "I want The Female Boss to be a big brand. Next I want to launch a clothing line." In October 2012, she launched a fashion line with Bank Fashion called "TFB by Tulisa."

Tulisa was named the "Ultimate TV Personality" at Cosmopolitan Ultimate Women of the Year Awards on 30 October 2012.

== Drugs trial entrapment ==
Following a tabloid newspaper sting operation, Tulisa was arrested by police on 4 June 2013 on suspicion of supplying class A drugs and bailed to a date in July 2013. Two residential properties had been searched as part of the investigation. She was formally charged on 9 December with "being concerned in the supply of Class A drugs" and appeared at Westminster Magistrates' Court on 19 December where she denied being involved with the supply of 13.9 grams of cocaine. She was granted unconditional bail and then appeared at Southwark Crown Court on 9 January 2014.

The trial date was set for 14 July 2014. The case was dismissed as the judge believed prosecution witness and undercover journalist Mazher Mahmood had lied to the court. Mahmood was later sent to prison for 15 months. In July 2014, her documentary Tulisa: The Price of Fame premiered on BBC Three to a moderate success, attracting 615,000 viewers (3.8% of the audience within its time slot). In April 2015, Justice Nicholas Kearns, President of the Irish High Court, described her as having been "cruelly deceived in a shabby sting operation", but dismissed her attempt to sue the Irish Sun for defamation.

Following the collapse of her drug trial, The Guardian's Suzanne Moore discussed her reputation, and wrote that "Tulisa is famously a working class girl made good, though of course made good is never what she is allowed to be". In Moore's opinion, "Tulisa has been branded by the media as a chav and therefore almost anything can be said about her".

On 14 August 2025, Tulisa released her book, Judgement. It is heavily centred on the year of the drugs trial and is described as "part reflection, part diary written in the eye of the storm". She elaborates on the lengths The Sun on Sunday went to entrap her, including how she was encouraged to lie about being familiar with illegal drug deals, by an undercover journalist, in order to boost the chances of securing a movie role.

== Personal life ==
Despite being baptised in her father's Greek Orthodox faith, Tulisa later became a practising Roman Catholic.

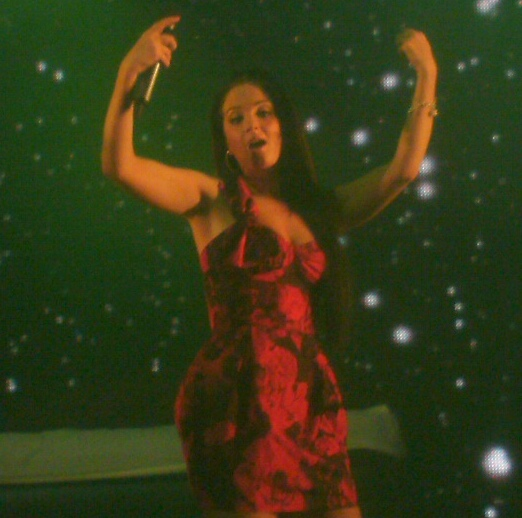
Tulisa in 2010

In March 2012, a six-minute sex tape of Tulisa and her former boyfriend Justin Edwards emerged on the internet. Tulisa was granted an injunction that legally blocks the distribution of the tape. In the aftermath she recorded a video response on her YouTube account, stating that she was both heartbroken and devastated by Edwards' release of the video. In July, she settled with Edwards but continued to pursue action against Edwards' former manager Chris Herbert, who had his job as a consultant on The X Factor suspended.

On 9 March 2020, Tulisa revealed she suffered from Bell's palsy.

In 2024, Tulisa came out as demisexual, and said she had been celibate for the last three years.

== Discography ==
- The Female Boss (2012)

== Filmography ==
=== Television ===
Year	Title	Role	Notes
2007–2009	Dubplate Drama	Laurissa	Series 2–3
2010	Tulisa: My Mum & Me	Herself	Documentary
2010–2011	Being... N-Dubz	Herself	Documentary
2010–2012	Alan Carr: Chatty Man	Herself	Guest; 3 episodes
2010–2016	Celebrity Juice	Herself	10 episodes
2011	Before They Were Dubz	Herself	Documentary
2011	Wall of Fame	Guest Panellist	1 episode
2011–2012, 2014	The X Factor	Judge	
2012	Britain's Got Talent	Performer	1 episode
2012	The Talent Show Story	Herself	
2012–2020	Loose Women	Herself	Guest; 5 episodes
2013–2015	Sweat the Small Stuff	Herself	5 episodes
2014	Tulisa: The Price of Fame	Herself	Documentary
2016	Hoff The Record	Herself	Cameo appearance
2016	Off Their Rockers	Guest Prankster	Series 4, episode 6
2018	Don't Hate the Playaz	Herself	1 episode
2024	I'm a Celebrity...Get Me Out of Here!	Contestant	

=== Podcasts ===
Year	Title	Role	Notes	Ref.
2024	Saving Grace	Guest		

=== Film ===
Year	Title	Role
2011	Demons Never Die	Amber
2011	Big Fat Gypsy Gangster	Shaniqua
