= N-Dubz discography =

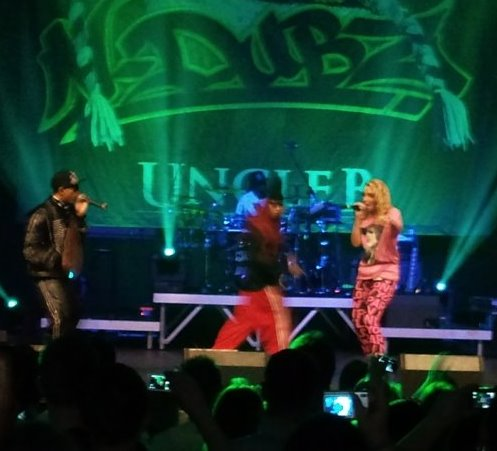
- N-Dubz performing on their Uncle B tour
- Studio albums: 4
- Extended plays: 1
- Compilation albums: 1
- Singles: 21
- Video albums: 5
- Music videos: 26

The discography of English hip hop trio N-Dubz consists of twenty-one singles, four studio albums, two extended plays, 28 music videos, five video albums and one compilation album. N-Dubz have won four MOBO awards; Best Newcomer in 2007, Best Album for their debut album Uncle B) and Best Act in 2009 and Best Song in 2010 for their single "Playing with Fire" featuring Mr Hudson. The band released their first compilation album, Greatest Hits, on 28 November 2011 after announcing indefinite hiatus so the members could focus on solo projects. Following an eleven-year hiatus, N-Dubz released their comeback single "Charmer" in 2022, which reached number thirty-two on the UK Singles Chart.

== Albums ==
=== Studio albums ===
List of albums, with chart positions and certifications
Title	Album details	Peak chart positions					Certifications
Title	Album details	UK	UK R&B	EUR	GRE	IRE	Certifications
Uncle B	Released: 17 November 2008; Label: AATW; Formats: CD, Vinyl, digital download	11	10	41	—	36	BPI: 2× Platinum
Against All Odds	Released: 13 November 2009; Label: AATW, Island; Formats: CD, digital download	6	4	25	12	39	BPI: Platinum
Love.Live.Life	Released: 29 November 2010; Label: AATW, Island; Formats: CD, digital download	7	3	—	—	33	BPI: Platinum
Timeless	Released: 4 August 2023; Label: EMI; Formats: CD, Vinyl, Cassette, digital download, Streaming	6	1	—	—	—	
"—" denotes album that did not chart or was not released

=== Compilation album ===
Title	Album details	Peak chart positions		Certifications
Title	Album details	UK	IRE	Certifications
Greatest Hits	Release: 28 November 2011; Label: AATW, Island; Formats: CD, digital download	10	99	BPI: Platinum

=== Video albums ===
- ZeeTVD: Behind the Scenes (2009)
- N-Dubz Video EP (2010)
- The Making of Love.Live.Life (2011)
- Before They Were Dubz (2011)
- Love.Live.Life Live at the O2 Arena (2011)

== Extended plays ==
Title	EP details
iTunes Festival: London 2010	Released: 20 July 2010; Label: All Around the World; Format: Digital download

== Singles ==
=== As lead artist ===
Single	Year	Peak chart positions					Certifications	Album
Single	Year	UK	UK R&B	EUR	IRE	SCO	Certifications	Album
"You Better Not Waste My Time"	2006	26	8	—	—	45		Uncle B
"I Swear"	2006	91	13	—	—	—	BPI: Gold	Uncle B
"Feva Las Vegas"	2007	57	7	—	—	46		Uncle B
"Ouch"	2008	22	—	—	—	12	BPI: Gold	Uncle B
"Papa Can You Hear Me?"	2008	19	3	55	—	23	BPI: Silver	Uncle B
"Strong Again"	2009	24	5	75	—	—	BPI: Silver	Uncle B
"Wouldn't You"	2009	64	19	—	—	—		Uncle B
"I Need You"	2009	5	—	—	22	8	BPI: Platinum	Against All Odds
"Playing with Fire" (featuring Mr Hudson)	2009	14	3	40	28	17	BPI: Platinum	Against All Odds
"Say It's Over"	2010	20	10	59	50	27	BPI: Silver	Against All Odds
"We Dance On" (featuring Bodyrox)	2010	6	5	—	9	6	BPI: Silver	Love.Live.Life
"Best Behaviour"	2010	10	—	—	32	10	BPI: Gold	Love.Live.Life
"Girls"	2010	18	4	—	48	22	BPI: Gold	Love.Live.Life
"Morning Star"	2011	52	15	*	—	46		Love.Live.Life
"Charmer"	2022	32	13	*	—	*		Non-album single
"February"	2023	— (Note: "February" did not enter the UK Top 100, but debuted at number 28 on the UK Singles Sales Chart Top 100 on 5 May 2023.)	—	*	—	*		Timeless
"Habibti"	2023	—	—	*	—	*		Timeless
"The Ick"	2023	—	—	*	—	*		Timeless
"—" denotes a recording that did not chart or was not released in that territory. "*" denotes the chart is discontinued.

=== As featured artist ===
Single	Year	Peak chart positions				Certifications	Album
Single	Year	UK	UK R&B	IRE	EUR	Certifications	Album
"Number 1" (Tinchy Stryder featuring N-Dubz)	2009	1	1	1	6	BPI: 2× Platinum	Catch 22
"I Got Soul" (as part of Young Soul Rebels)	2009	10	6	19	—		Non-album single
"Lose My Life" (Chipmunk featuring N-Dubz)	2009	77	25	—	—		I Am Chipmunk
"So Alive" (Skepta vs. N-Dubz)	2011	99	26	—	*		Doin' It Again
"Stuttering" (Loick Essien featuring N-Dubz)	2011	36	12	—	*		Non-album single
"—" denotes single that did not chart or was not released. "*" denotes the chart is discontinued.

== Music videos ==
Year	Song	Director(s)
2004	"Everyday of My Life" (as NW1)	George Burt
2006	"You Better Not Waste My Time" (first version)	N/A
2006	"I Swear"	George Burt
2006	"Love for My Slum"	Zac Steiner-Anderson
2007	"You Better Not Waste My Time" (second version)	Emil Nava
2008	"Ouch"	George Burt
2008	"Defeat You" (with Chipmunk)	Vertex & Co
2008	"Papa Can You Hear Me?"	Max & Dania
2009	"Strong Again"	Max & Dania
2009	"Wouldn't You"	Ben Peters
2009	"Number 1" (with Tinchy Stryder)	Emil Nava
2009	"I Need You"	Dale "Rage" Resteghini
2009	"I Got Soul"	
2010	"Playing With Fire"	Dale "Rage" Resteghini
2010	"Duku Man Skit"	George Burt
2010	"Say It's Over"	Ben Peters
2010	"Na Na (Boy Better Know!)"	Ben Peters
2010	"We Dance On"	Ben Peters
2010	"Let Me Be"	
2010	"Addicted to Love"	
2010	"Best Behaviour"	Ben Peters
2010	"Girls"	Dale "Rage" Resteghini
2010	"Stuttering" (with Loick Essien)	
2010	"So Alive" (with Skepta)	
2011	"Morning Star"	
2011	"Cold Shoulder"	
2022	"Charmer"	Ray Fiasco
2023	"February"	
2023	"Habibti"	
2023	"The Ick"	Reece Selvadorai

== Other appearances ==
Year	Single	Album
2009	"Papa Can You Hear Me?"	Radio 1's Live Lounge - Volume 4
2010	"The Man Who Can't Be Moved" / "Breakeven" (cover of The Script)	Radio 1's Live Lounge - Volume 5
