= N-Dubz Christmas Party =

2009 concert tour by N-Dubz

- Tour by N-Dubz
- Location: United Kingdom
- Associated album: Uncle B Against All Odds
- Start date: 17 November 2009
- End date: 13 December 2009
- No. of shows: 12

N-Dubz concert chronology
- Uncle B tour (2009); N-Dubz Christmas Party (2009); The Against All Odds Tour (2010)

N-Dubz Christmas Party was the second United Kingdom tour by English hip hop trio, N-Dubz.

== Background ==
The tour was originally to be a taster of their second studio album, "Against All Odds", but it was later revealed that the album would be released one day before the tour starts. The official album tour will be in 2010.

== Supporting acts ==
- Esmee Denters
- Master Shortie
- Tinie Tempah
- Jaya
- Mz Bratt
- Saint

== Setlist ==
1. Intro / Strong Again
2. Shoulda Put Something On
3. I Need You
4. Playing with Fire
5. N-Dubz vs. NAA / Duku Man
6. You Better Not Waste My Time
7. I Swear
8. Love for My Slum
9. Feva Las Vegas
10. Secrets
11. Ouch (explicit)
12. Don't Get Nine
13. Papa Can You Hear Me?
14. Sex
15. Wouldn't You
16. Defeat You
17. Number 1 (N-Dubz version)
18. Work Work
19. The Man Who Can't Be Moved / Breakeven

The Clubland Live 3 part of the tour had a much smaller setlist, since N Dubz were only a semi-headlining act, with Cascada headlining the tour. The dates were 26 November to 6 December. The Setlist for Clubland Live 3 was:

1. Video Intro
2. N Dubz Band Intro
3. Strong Agaian
4. Papa Can You Hear Me
5. Against All Odds Album Advert/Band Solo
6. Number 1
7. Playing with Fire
8. I Need You

== Tour dates ==
All the tours been played have been sell outs except for 17 November in Southend and 24 November in Cambridge. The Folkestone show was rescheduled and was made part of their next tour.

Halfway through the tour, the group semi-headlined the "Clubland Live 3" tour, with fellow label mates, Cascada, Headlining. 26 November to 6 December was the Clubland dates. Other acts on the tour included Skyla, Infectious, Agnes, Darren Styles, Ultrabeat, Breeze, Frisco, Flip n Fill, Alex K, Mini Viva and Cascada. It is thought that N Dubz were taken on tour with Clubland only due to being signed to AATW records, and that many fans mentioned on the clubland forum that a small set from them would have added variety to the show.

Date	City	Country	Venue
17 November 2009	Southend	England	Cliffs Pavilion
18 November 2009	Oxford	England	O2 Academy
20 November 2009	Belfast	Northern Ireland	King's Hall
21 November 2009	Norwich	England	U.E.A.
22 November 2009	Bristol	England	O2 Academy
24 November 2009	Cambridge	England	Corn Exchange
26 November 2009	Glasgow	Scotland	SECC
27 November 2009	Aberdeen	Scotland	AECC
28 November 2009	Newcastle	England	Metro Radio Arena
29 November 2009	Sheffield	England	Sheffield Arena
1 December 2009	Dublin	Ireland	The O_{2}
2 December 2009	Belfast	Northern Ireland	Odyssey Arena
4 December 2009	Manchester	England	Manchester Evening News Arena
5 December 2009	London	England	Hammersmith Apollo
6 December 2009	Birmingham	England	National Indoor Arena
8 December 2009	Hull	England	Hull University
9 December 2009	Royal Leamington Spa	England	The Assembly
10 December 2009	London	England	O_{2} Empire
12 December 2009	Clacton-on-Sea	England	The Venue
13 December 2009	Salisbury	England	City Hall
