= Greatest Hits (N-Dubz album) =

Compilation album by N-Dubz
- Released: 28 November 2011
- Length: 52:03
- Label: Universal; Island
- Producer: Fazer; Dappy; Junior Edwards; Jack Freegard; Kane Robinson; Jim Jonsin; Fraser T Smith; Mr Hudson; Jean-Baptiste; Free School; Skepta; Dr. Luke; TMS

N-Dubz chronology
Love.Live.Life (2010)	Greatest Hits (2011)	Timeless (2023)

Greatest Hits is the first compilation album released by British trio N-Dubz, released following the announcement of the group's plans to go on a two-year hiatus. It was released in the United Kingdom on 28 November 2011 by Island Records. The album contains tracks from the band's three studio albums "Uncle B" (2008), "Against All Odds" (2009) and "Love.Live.Life" (2010). It includes fourteen of the group's singles, (excluding "Feva Las Vegas" and "We Dance On"), one album track, two live lounge covers and the original N-Dubz version of Dappy's first solo single, "No Regrets". The album's release comes after the group announced an indefinite hiatus to focus on solo careers.

Following the announcement of their Reformation Tour in May 2022, the album saw a resurgence in popularity, surpassing the peak of 38 upon the album's original release, entering the top 10 at number 10 on 27 May 2022.

== Critical reception ==
Professional ratings
Review scores
Source	Rating
AllMusic	3/5 stars

Jon O'Brien From AllMusic gave the album a mixed review and felt that their "Greatest Hits feels like a cynical cash-in that's appeared way too early in the band's career to make any impact." as well as criticizing the fact there are no new songs and that it did not include the song "We Dance On" which was a top 10 hit on the UK Singles Charts.

== Track listing ==
No.	Title	Writer(s)	Producer(s)	Length
1.	"I Swear" (from Uncle B)	N-Dubz; Junior Edwards	Fazer; Dappy; Junior Edwards	4:04
2.	"Ouch" (from Uncle B)	N-Dubz	Fazer; Dappy	3:57
3.	"You Better Not Waste My Time" (from Uncle B)	N-Dubz; Jack Freegard	Fazer; Dappy; Jack Freegard	3:25
4.	"Playing with Fire" (featuring Mr Hudson, from Against All Odds)	N-Dubz; Benjamin McIldowie	Fazer; Dappy	3:47
5.	"I Need You" (from Against All Odds)	N-Dubz	Fazer; Dappy	3:20
6.	"Strong Again" (from Uncle B)	N-Dubz; Kane Robinson; Fraser T. Smith	Fazer; Kane Robinson; Fraser T. Smith	3:14
7.	"Girls" (from Love.Live.Life)	N-Dubz; Jim Jonsin; James Scheffer; Leroy Sanchez; Daniel Morris	Jim Jonsin	2:50
8.	"Number 1" (featuring Tinchy Stryder, from Catch 22 and Against All Odds)	N-Dubz; Kwasi Danquah	Fraser T. Smith	3:33
9.	"Best Behaviour" (from Love.Live.Life)	N-Dubz; Benjamin McIldowie	Fazer; Dappy	3:57
10.	"Love Live Life" (from Love.Live.Life)	Jean-Baptiste; Ryan Buendia; Charlie Gibson; Nick Marsh; Michael McHenry	Free School	3:57
11.	"So Alive" (N-Dubz vs Skepta, from Doin' It Again and Love.Live.Life)	N-Dubz; Junior Adenuga	Skepta	3:38
12.	"Wouldn't You" (from Uncle B)	N-Dubz	Fazer; Dappy	3:54
13.	"Morning Star" (from Love.Live.Life)	N-Dubz; Jean-Baptiste; Ryan Buendia; Nick Marsh; McHenry; Sylvia Gordon	Free School	3:07
14.	"Say It's Over" (from Against All Odds)	N-Dubz; Junior Edwards	Fazer; Dappy; Junior Edwards	3:44
15.	"Papa Can You Hear Me" (from Uncle B)	N-Dubz	Fazer; Dappy	4:03
16.	"The Man Who Can't Be Moved"	Mark Sheehan; Danny O'Donoghue; Steve Kipner; Terius Nash; Thaddis Harrell; Christopher Stewart; Shawn Carter	Fazer; Dappy	4:00
17.	"About You Now"	Lukasz Gottwald; Cathy Dennis	Dr. Luke	3:32
18.	"No Regrets"	Costadinos Contostavlos; Ayak Thiik; TMS	TMS	3:49

== Charts ==
Chart (2011)	Peak position
Irish Albums Chart	99
UK Albums Chart	38

Chart (2022)	Peak position
UK Albums Chart	10

== Certifications ==
Region	Certification	Certified units/sales
United Kingdom (BPI)	Platinum	300,000^{‡}
^{‡} Sales+streaming figures based on certification alone.

== Release history ==
Region	Date	Format	Label
United Kingdom	28 November 2011	Digital Download, CD	AATW, Island Records
