= Love.Live.Life =

Studio album by N-Dubz
- Released: 29 November 2010
- Recorded: 2010
- Genre: R&B
- Length: 51:29
- Labels: All Around the World; Island
- Producers: Fazer; Bodyrox; Fuego; Jean-Baptiste; Jim Jonsin; Junior Edwards; Max Gousse; Mr Hudson; Parker & James; Salaam Remi; Skepta; Soundz; Free School; Hernest Bellevue; Tyron "Ty Dolla $ign" Griffin

N-Dubz chronology
Against All Odds (2009)	Love.Live.Life (2010)	Greatest Hits (2011)

Singles from Love.Live.Life
- 1. "We Dance On" Released: 20 May 2010; 2. "Best Behaviour" Released: 17 October 2010; 3. "Girls" Released: 13 December 2010; 4. "So Alive" Released: 6 February 2011; 5. "Morning Star" Released: 14 March 2011

Love.Live.Life is the third studio album released by the English hip-hop trio N-Dubz, released on 29 November 2010, as a collaboration by All Around the World and Island Records. Following the release of the album the group announced a hiatus to focus on all three individual solo projects.

== Background ==
The group began recording the album following the success of Against All Odds. Following the success of the group's MOBO Award-winning single "Playing with Fire", the group announced that they would be embarking on a trip to the United States in an attempt to secure a record deal for themselves there. The group, however, were banned from travelling to the country because of visa issues which were later resolved in early February. Former Island Def Jam boss L.A. Reid, a big N-Dubz fan, then arranged a meeting with the group with the intention of signing the trio to his label. In May 2010, it was announced that the group had secured a five-album recording deal with Island Records. The group recorded the album with American producers Salaam Remi, Jean Baptiste and Jim Jonsin on the album. The making of the album was released on DVD.

== Singles ==
"We Dance On" was released on 20 May 2010 as the album's lead single. It peaked at #5 on the UK Singles Chart. The song was also included on the soundtrack to the film Streetdance 3D. "Best Behaviour" was released on 17 October 2010 as the second single from the album. It peaked at 10 in both the UK and Scotland, and became a top 40 hit in Ireland. The song also appears on Skepta's album Doin' It Again. "Girls" was released as the album's third single on 12 December 2010. It peaked at 19 on the UK Singles Chart. A fourth track from the album, "So Alive" was released as single on 6 February 2011. The album's fifth and final single, "Morning Star" was released on 14 March.

=== Promotional music videos ===
Music videos for "Took It All Away" and "Cold Shoulder" were recorded and released in promotion of the album. "Took It All Away" features clips from the video game LittleBigPlanet. "Cold Shoulder" features footage of the Love.Live.Life tour.

== Critical reception ==
Professional ratings
Review scores
Source	Rating
AllMusic	3.5/5 stars
Daily Mirror	3/5 stars
NME	2.5/5 stars
The Guardian	3/5 stars
The Independent	3/5 stars
The Observer	2.5/5 stars
The Scotsman	2/5 stars
Yahoo! Music	2/5 stars

The album has received mixed reviews from contemporary music critics. Gavin Martin of the Daily Mirror gave the album a three star rating, deeming it upbeat and boisterous. Martin felt that "[the album's] quality wavers but Transatlantic studio muscle and tracks like 'Toot It and Boot It' may see an advance on [N-Dubz's] U.S. ambitions." Andy Gill of The Independent deemed the album as "a fairly predictable fare", highlighting "So Alive" as its best track: "The best piece on here is 'So Alive,' blessed with bullient bonhomie which despite the lingering attitude, proves engagingly infectious." Fraser McAlpine from NME said of the album: "What N-Dubz try to express as anthemic wisdom always seems to come out braggier and shoutier than they mean to." Killian Fox of The Observer felt that for all the album's dynamism, it feels like a formula-driven move, and its insistence on having fun wears thin. While Fiona Sheperd of The Scotsman said that Love.Live.Life oscillates between processed mulch such as "Love Sick" and more successful grime crossover tracks like "So Alive". Sheperd further deemed the album as "still just kids' stuff."

== Track listing ==
No.	Title	Writer(s)	Producer(s)	Length
1.	"Intro"	N-Dubz; Zachery Anderson	Fazer	1:25
2.	"Best Behaviour"	N-Dubz; Ben Hudson	Fazer; Mr Hudson	3:57
3.	"Took It All Away"	N-Dubz; NMQ	Fazer; Martin 'NMQ' Anderson	3:39
4.	"Living for the Moment"	N-Dubz; Ursula Yancy; Kenneth Coby	Soundz; Josh Franceschi	4:54
5.	"Love Live Life"	Jean Baptiste Kouame; Ryan Buendia; Charlie Gibson; Nick Marsh; Michael McHenry	Free School	3:57
6.	"Scream My Name"	N-Dubz; Boy Reckless; Ina Wroldsen; Nate Walka; Max Gousse; Anderson	Fuego; Gousse; Mark Hoppus	3:03
7.	"Love Sick" (featuring Ny)	N-Dubz; Wroldsen; Peter Ighile; Kyle Abrahams; Dion Wardle	Parker & James	3:50
8.	"Toot It and Boot It" (featuring YG and Ty Dolla $ign)	Dappy; Kevin Jackson; Tyron Griffin; Martin Newman; Nim Lee; Tommy Bluechel	Ty Dolla $ign; Gousse; Chad Gilbert	4:03
9.	"Skit" (featuring Fearless)	Dappy; Antony Evoloko	Fazer	2:38
10.	"So Alive" (featuring Skepta)	N-Dubz; Joseph Adenuga	Skepta	3:38
11.	"Girls"	N-Dubz; Jim Jonsin; Danny Morris; Anderson	Jonsin	2:50
12.	"Cold Shoulder"	N-Dubz; Salaam Remi; Hernest Bellevue; Yancy	Remi; Bellevue	3:13
13.	"Morning Star"	Jean Baptiste; Buendia; Nick Marsh; McHenry; Simon Gordon	Free School	3:07
14.	"We Dance On" (featuring Bodyrox)	N-Dubz; Norman Bridges; Luciana Caporoso; Nick Clow; Jon Pearn	Bodyrox	2:53
15.	"Outro"	N-Dubz; Anderson	Fazer	1:30

== Additional credits ==
- Management by Jonathan Shalit and Rich Castillo for ROAR Global, London
- Represented by Rich Castillo; assisted by Dean Ondrus Coulson for ROAR 2wo7even
- A&R for IDJ – Max Gousse
- Live guitars by Martin Anderson
- Design and artwork by enjine

== Love.Live.Life.Tour ==
=== Tour dates ===
Love.Live.Life
- Tour by N-Dubz
- Location: United Kingdom
- Associated album: Love.Live.Life
- Start date: 11 April 2011
- End date: 30 July 2011
- No. of shows: 22

N-Dubz concert chronology
- The Against All Odds Tour (2010); Love.Live.Life.Tour (2011)

The Love.Live.Life. Tour commenced on 11 April 2011 in the Isle of Wight. A DVD of the tour was released on 22 August 2011. The DVD was recorded during the concert at the O2 Arena on 30 April 2011.

Date	City	Country	Venue
Europe
11 April 2011	Isle of Wight	England	Ryde Arena
12 April 2011	Margate	England	Margate Winter Gardens
13 April 2011	Grimsby	England	Grimsby Auditorium
14 April 2011	Doncaster	England	Doncaster Dome
16 April 2011	Belfast	Northern Ireland	Waterfront Hall
17 April 2011	Dublin	Ireland	Olympia Theatre
19 April 2011	Nottingham	England	Nottingham Royal Concert Hall
21 April 2011	Glasgow	Scotland	Scottish Exhibition and Conference Centre
22 April 2011	Newcastle	England	Metro Radio Arena
23 April 2011	Bournemouth	England	Bournemouth International Centre
24 April 2011	Plymouth	England	Plymouth Pavilions
26 April 2011	Brighton	England	Brighton Centre
28 April 2011	Manchester	England	Manchester Evening News Arena
29 April 2011	Birmingham	England	LG Arena
30 April 2011	London	England	The O_{2} Arena
6 May 2011	Bristol	England	O2 Academy Bristol
7 May 2011	Leicester	England	O2 Academy Leicester
8 May 2011	Leeds	England	O2 Academy Leeds
20 May 2011	Oxford	England	O2 Academy Oxford
21 May 2011	Liverpool	England	O2 Academy Liverpool
30 July 2011	Scarborough	England	Scarborough Open Air Theatre

Cancellations and rescheduled shows

9 May 2011	Liverpool, England	O2 Academy Liverpool	Rescheduled to 21 May 2011
12 May 2011	Oxford, England	O2 Academy Oxford	Rescheduled to 20 May 2011

=== Set list ===
1. "Took It All Away"
2. "Strong Again"
3. "Living for the Moment"
4. "Playing with Fire"
5. "I Swear"
6. "Girls"
7. "Toot It and Boot It"
8. "Meet Me Halfway"
9. "Down"
10. "My Name Is Tulisa"
11. "Love Sick"
12. "Scream My Name"
13. "Love.Live.Life"
14. "Morning Star"
15. "Say It's Over"
16. "Cold Shoulder"
17. "So Alive"
18. "Papa Can You Hear Me?"
19. "Defeat You"
20. "Love for My Slums"
21. "Better Not Waste My Time"
22. "Ouch"
23. "Sex"
24. "Number 1"
25. "Best Behaviour"

=== Supporting acts ===
- Starboy Nathan
- Professor Green (from 21 April)
- Fearless
- Encore
- Ny

== The band ==
- Guitar: Martin 'NMQ' Anderson
- Drums: Jonathan 'Ginger' Hamilton
- Keyboards: Gavin Powell
- Bass: Michael ' Smoove Groove' Hamilton

== Charts ==
=== Weekly charts ===
Chart (2010)	Peak position
Irish Albums (IRMA)	33
Scottish Albums (Official Charts)	17
UK Albums (Official Charts)	7
UK R&B Albums (Official Charts)	3

=== Year-end charts ===
Chart (2010)	Position
UK Albums (OCC)	60
Chart (2011)	Position
UK Albums (OCC)	186

== Certifications ==
Country	Provider	Certification
United Kingdom	BPI	Platinum

== Release history ==
Region	Date	Label
Ireland	28 November 2010	All Around the World / Island
United Kingdom	28 November 2010	All Around the World / Island
