= MOBO Awards 2009 =

British music award in Glasgow, Scotland

- Date: 30 September 2009
- Location: Scottish Exhibition and Conference Centre, Glasgow, Scotland
- Hosted by: Reggie Yates; Keri Hilson
- Website: mobo.com

Television/radio coverage
- Network: BBC Three (live coverage); BBC One (highlights)

The 2009 MOBO Awards took place on 30 September 2009 at the Scottish Exhibition and Conference Centre (SECC) in Glasgow, Scotland.

This was the first time the awards took place outside London. A tribute performance was dedicated to Michael Jackson, who was honoured with the MOBO Lifetime Achievement Award, and the Young Soul Rebels performed their charity single, "I Got Soul". Reggie Yates and Keri Hilson hosted the awards. Other guests included Rihanna who opened the show and Amir Khan who presented an award. The show was watched by an estimated 250 million viewers worldwide.

== List of nominations and winners ==
(winners in bold)

=== Best UK Act ===
- Alesha Dixon
- Bashy
- Beverley Knight
- Dizzee Rascal
- DJ Ironik
- Donae'o
- Mr Hudson
- **N-Dubz**
- Tinchy Stryder

=== Best Newcomer ===
- Alexandra Burke
- Jade Ewen
- **JLS**
- Laura Izibor
- Master Shortie
- N-Dubz

=== Best R&B/Soul Act ===
- Beverley Knight
- Ciara
- Jeremih
- **Keri Hilson**
- Lemar

=== Best Hip-Hop Act ===
- **Chipmunk**
- Dizzee Rascal
- Drake
- Eminem
- Kanye West

=== Best Music Video ===
- Dizzee Rascal - "Bonkers"
- Alesha Dixon - "The Boy Does Nothing"
- Chipmunk - "Diamond Rings" (featuring Emeli Sandé)
- **Beyoncé - "Single Ladies (Put a Ring on It)"**
- Mr. Hudson - "Supernova" (featuring Kanye West)

=== Best International Act ===
- Akon
- **Beyoncé**
- Ciara
- Mariah Carey
- Eminem
- Jay-Z
- Kanye West
- Keri Hilson
- Lady Gaga
- Drake

=== Best Song ===
- **JLS - "Beat Again"**
- Chipmunk - "Diamond Rings" (featuring Emeli Sandé)
- K.I.G. Family - "Head, Shoulders, Knees and Toes"
- Tinchy Stryder - "Number 1" (featuring N-Dubz)
- N-Dubz - "Strong Again"

=== Best Album ===
- Kanye West - 808s & Heartbreak
- Tinchy Stryder - Catch 22
- Bashy - Catch Me If You Can
- Beyoncé - I Am... Sasha Fierce
- **N-Dubz - Uncle B**

=== Best Reggae ===
- Mavado
- **Sean Paul**
- Serani
- Tarrus Riley
- Vybz Kartel
- Alamin Rahman

=== Best DJ ===
- Manny Norte
- Masterstepz
- Mistajam
- Ras Kwame
- Rickie & Melvin
- Sarah Love
- Semtex
- Shortee Blitz
- Steve Sutherland
- DJ Target
- Tim Westwood
- **Trevor Nelson**

=== Best Jazz Act ===
- Diana Krall
- Herbie Hancock
- Madeleine Peyroux
- Melody Gardot
- **Yolanda Brown**

=== Best African Act ===
- Amadou and Mariam
- Baaba Maal
- Eldee
- Femi Kuti
- K'Naan
- Lira
- Mujava
- **Nneka**
- Oumou Sangare
- Salif Keita

=== Best Gospel Act ===
- Desire to Worship God
- Kiki Sheard
- Mary Mary
- New Direction
- **Victizzle**

=== Lifetime achievement award ===
- **Michael Jackson**

== See also ==
- Music of Black Origin Awards
