= I Need You (N-Dubz song) =

Single by N-Dubz

from the album Against All Odds
- B-side: "I Need You" (Red Top Mix)
- Released: 9 November 2009
- Length: 3:20
- Label: All Around the World
- Songwriters: Dino Contostavlos; Tula Contostavlos; Richard Rawson
- Producers: Dino Contostavlos; Richard Rawson

N-Dubz singles chronology
"I Got Soul" (2009)	"I Need You" (2009)	"Playing With Fire" (2010)

Music video
- "I Need You" on YouTube

"I Need You" is a song performed, written and produced by English hip hop trio N-Dubz. The song was written by all the group members: Dappy, Fazer and Tulisa. Dappy and Fazer have been noted as the track's producers. Released through All Around The World on 9 November 2009, "I Need You" acted as the group's eighth official single as well as the lead single from their Platinum-certified second album, Against All Odds.

== Background ==
The song was written by all the members of the group, and produced by members Dappy and Fazer. "I Need You" is a hip-house song that uses club synthesisers and sirens that were described by Digital Spy as "Hawkish." Among the influences in the song include: R&B, pop, house and British hip hop. The track is composed in the key of A-minor with a tempo of 130 beats per minute. The track has a vocal structure of intro - verse - chorus - verse - chorus - bridge - chorus - outro. The intro and outro use lines from the chorus where Dappy sings and ad-libs, the outro however combines ad-libs of both Dappy and Tulisa. The first verse and chorus is sung and rapped in call-response by Dappy. The second verse is sung in call-response by Tulisa, who then joins in on call-response with Dappy in the second and final choruses. Fazer raps the song's bridge. Ad-libs are sung throughout the song by Dappy with Tulisa contributing to the ad-libs in the final chorus.

In an interview, Dappy described the song as being "up-tempo, fast, party music" as well as being "Up-to-date and about Facebook and stuff." The song lyrics follow a theme of infatuation and disappointment with each member describing their own personal experience of how they met someone they thought was 'The one' and how the person left before they were able to get the phone number. References by Dappy include how he searched on Facebook for the woman he never got a phone number from. Tulisa's story includes how she wore a "LBD" and "Bang bang shoes" when leaving her date for a moment to go to the ladies bathroom at a club and on return discovering he left her without his phone number. Despite the lyric in the song referring to searching for someone you are in love with on Facebook, in an interview with Hollyoaks, Dappy said that that is not something he does:

If I want to get in touch with someone, I'll just ring them, man. A lot of girls might be trying to find me on Facebook, but they won't. They'll find a fake one.

The single made A-list rotation on BBC Radio 1 on 21 October - making it the trio's second single to be A-listed on the station after "Strong Again" which was A-listed in early 2009. The song garnered commercial success for the group in both the United Kingdom and Ireland, where it reached peaks of #5 and #22. The song became the group's most successful single and first top ten hit as solo artists. A modern, club-scene inspired music video directed by Rage, to "I Need You" was released on 21 September 2009. N-Dubz promoted the single by performing it on various television and radio shows. Of which included: GMTV, Live Lounge and T4's Stars of 2009.

== Reception ==
=== Critical ===
David Balls of Digital Spy gave the song a positive review: "Unafraid to drop a line like "My name's Shaniqua and what?", it was only a matter of time before N-Dubz turned their large underground following into mainstream success. Now, having shifted over 500,000 copies of debut disc Uncle B and reached No.1 alongside Tinchy Stryder, the Camden trio are aiming to become leaders of the Brrap pack with second album Against All Odds. Reflecting their move up pop's pecking order, this trailer single is their biggest, most bombastic moment yet. It's got hawkish sirens and loads of clubby synths - evidently inspired by Fraser T Smith's production on the Tinchy album - but N-Dubz haven't lost their usual quirky charm, dropping in oh-so-relevant references to Facebook and LBDs (that's "little black dress", fellas). With an appeal that extends far beyond the back of the bus, 'I Need You' is – to borrow a word from the inimitable Dappy - probably best described as a "smasher"." Alt-Uk.net reviewed the track: "I Need You is an absolute fun-packed single from N-Dubz, and whilst listening to this one it really is difficult not to start singing along. N-Dubz once again demonstrates here a great knack for penning a perfect pop song, and this group certainly seems to know what it's doing when it comes to making the music as infectious as possible." Fraser McAlpine of the BBC Chart Blog also positively reviewed the song, mentioning: "It's this kind of bonkers happenstance which I love. I basically do internal bogglejumps whenever they do something like that. Pop songs are so safe, and N-Dubz seem to wander over the lines of acceptable behaviour almost as if they don't realise they are there." The Chemistry Is Dead described the single as being "much more mainstream" as well as something that would "appeal to their old fans and new fans alike." Inside Gossip labelled "I Need You" as a "club banger that has set the standards and told the world that they are here and that they are not one hit wonders."

=== Commercial ===
"I Need You" debuted and peaked at #22 on the Irish Singles Chart issued for 12 November 2009. It dropped five places to #27 the following week and on 26 November 2009 it dropped eight places to #35. The single dropped four places to #39 in its final week of charting on 3 December 2009. It spent a total of four weeks in the chart and is the group's most successful single on this chart as solo artists.

On 15 November 2009, "I Need You" debuted and peaked at #5 on the UK Singles Chart with sales of 49,615, it is the highest entry for N-Dubz on the UK Singles Chart. The single was released in the UK in a week which saw various other big-name artists competing for a position in the top ten, including Leona Lewis who debuted at #2 with her single "Happy". N-Dubz managed to outsell Britney Spears who debuted at #7 with her single "3" as well as Sugababes who debuted at #8 with their single "About a Girl." The following week, on 22 November, "I Need You" dropped four places to #9, selling 31,349 copies for that week, and in its third week on the chart, the single dropped four places to #13. On 6 December 2009 the song dropped fourteen spots to #27 before falling a further seven spots the week after to #34. For the chart issued for the week ending 26 December, the single fell ten places to #44 on its sixth week of charting. After the Christmas period of 2009 and upon the new year into 2010, the single started rebounding on the chart - climbing a place to #43 in week seven and then climbing a further seven places to re-enter the top forty at #36 in week eight. Its ninth week on the chart saw it drop out of the top forty for the second time to #47. "I Need You" has spent a total of nine weeks within the chart and has sold an estimate of over 145,000 copies. "I Need You" is N-Dubz's highest charting single as a solo artist outpeaking previous record holder, "Papa Can You Hear Me?"'s peak of #19.

In an interview with RWD Mag, Tulisa explained how she felt about the single reaching #5 on the charts:

Yeah, it was wicked but we might have gone to No.1 if it wasn't for [...] X Factor. You work so long and then someone comes up after five minutes and you feel like 'You don't deserve it like we do.' That sounds bad but that's how I feel...

== Music video ==
N-Dubz on the roof in the music video for "I Need You"

The music video for "I Need You" was filmed on 13 September 2009. It was produced by Luti Fagbenle who has produced music videos for the likes of Craig David and Mr Hudson. The video was directed by American director Dale "Rage" Resteghini and edited by John Holloway. The official music video premiered on 4music on 20 September 2009. Rage also directed the group's music video for previous single "Wouldn't You". The music video begins with the "N-Dubz" logo appearing onscreen. The group is then shown arriving at the (Battersea) London Heliport in an atmosphere of stormy weather. Dappy arrives in a personalized helicopter also with the N-Dubz logo on, Fazer arrives on a 2004 Yamaha R1 with race fairings, and Tulisa arrives in a white Lamborghini Gallardo SE. The three members then come together as a group and start performing the song at the Heliport in front of the modes of the transport they came in. This scene is continuously in a call-and-response with the scene in the nightclub. In this Dappy wears a black hoodie underneath a white Adidas pullover and black sunglasses. Tulisa sports a new hairstyle from previous music videos, with straight hair and a fringe which is tied up in this scene. She is wearing tight black pants and a blue sweater over a white shirt. Fazer is seen wearing a black leather jacket lined in white on the bottom ends, black sunglasses and a black beanie. The group are then arrive together at the Vendome nightclub in Mayfair London and cuts back to the roof throughout the video. In this scene Dappy is seen wearing his characteristic headpiece, coloured in red for the video to contrast with its black-red colour theme, he wears a red hoodie that is striped with black lines. Tulisa is seen wearing a 'LBD' and 'bang bang shoes,' with her hair untied and made-up with red lipstick. Fazer has a red hoodie on with a matching red cap. Each member is seen singing to a partner in the club, where when they leave to go somewhere and come back their partner disappears. Dappy's scene takes place on a red sofa, Tulisa's in a secluded white room and Fazer's on the dancefloor. After the group members' partners left them, they can all be seen sitting on a sofa in the dancefloor area of the nightclub singing. In one scene Dappy can be seen accessing Facebook to find his missing partner - contrasting with the song's lyric 'I've been searching all over Facebook but I can't seem to find you'. Tulisa in another scene can be seen taking a picture of herself and her partner with a mobile phone. Prominent flashing lights and neons are visible throughout the video, of which take on a red colour in the nightclub and a white colour on the rooftop and at the Heliport. The music video ends with the members walking away from the camera which then cuts to a view of city lights.

Digital Spy said of the video: "They have really upped their game and splashed the cash. One scene sees Dappy flying a personalised helicopter. He had to fly it himself with an instructor by his side and he was very nervous". In an interview with Digital Spy, Dappy described the music video as being "Big and phat" and despite the director, Rage, being American, "It still feels very British".

== Promotion ==
"I Need You" was performed by the group on 24 October on TMi. 4 November 2009 saw the trio do a mini interview and performance of the single on GMTV. The threesome also performed the track at a Shaw and Crampton school where they took part in an anti-bullying campaign. On 12 November, N-Dubz performed "I Need You" on BBC Radio 1 show, Live Lounge which also saw the group cover "The Man Who Can't Be Moved", the signature song and hit single by Irish band The Script. On 29 November, "I Need You" was performed on T4's Stars of 2009 at Earl's Court in London, also at the event were Kasabian, La Roux, Calvin Harris and Tinchy Stryder. On 5 December, N-Dubz performed the track in a set-list which included the group's other singles: "Number 1," "Papa Can You Hear Me?," "Playing With Fire" and "Strong Again" as part of Clubland 3 promotion at the Hammersmith Apollo alongside the likes of Cascada, Agnes and Mini Viva. On 5 December, N-Dubz performed the single alongside the likes of Lady Gaga, JLS and The Saturdays at Capital FM's Jingle Bell Ball.

Airplaywise, "I Need You" was strongly promoted and a great success. On 30 September 2009, it was playlisted onto BBC Radio 1 C-list. On 7 October it moved up to B-list rotation after just one week of airplay. The single remained on B-list rotation for another week on 14 October. "I Need You" was then moved up to A-list rotation on 21 October, giving N-Dubz their second A-list single after "Strong Again" was A-listed on the station in early 2009. The song spent a total of five weeks on the A-list, its last week on the playlist being the one of 18 November.

== Track listing ==
- Digital Download
1. "I Need You" - 3:22
2. "I Need You" (Red Top Mix) - 3:32
3. "I Need You" (Extended Mix) - 6:23
4. "I Need You" (DJs At War Remix) - 5:39
- CD Single
1. "I Need You" - 3:22
2. "I Need You" (Red Top Mix) - 3:32

== Charts ==
=== Weekly charts ===
Chart (2009)	Peak position
Ireland (IRMA)	22
Scottish Singles Sales (Official Charts)	8
UK Singles (Official Charts)	5
UK Dance (Official Charts)	1

=== Year-end charts ===
Chart (2009)	Position
UK Singles (OCC)	116

== Certifications ==
Region	Certification	Certified units/sales
United Kingdom (BPI)	Platinum	600,000^{‡}
^{‡} Sales+streaming figures based on certification alone.
