= Killer (Fazer song) =

Single by Fazer
- Released: 26 August 2012
- Recorded: 2011
- Genre: Electronica, dubstep, hip hop
- Length: 3:48
- Label: All Around The World
- Songwriter(s): Richard Rawson, Tom Barnes, Ben Kohn, Peter Kelleher
- Producer(s): Fazer

"Killer" is the debut solo single released by British hip hop producer and rapper Fazer, also known for his work with the hip hop trio N-Dubz. "Killer" was taken as the lead single from his untitled debut studio album. The single was released on August 26, 2012, peaking at number 17 on the UK Singles Chart. He became the only member from N-Dubz not to score a number one single with his first solo hit.

== Track listing ==
Digital download
No.	Title	Length
1.	"Killer" (Album Mix)	3:48
2.	"Killer" (Agent X Gassed Mix)	4:53
3.	"Killer" (Woz Remix)	4:37
4.	"Killer" (MNEK's Hide the Evidence Remix)	4:08
5.	"Killer" (Rudedog Remix)	6:37
Total length:		21:04

== Music video ==
The music video for the track was directed by Jack Fresh, although the concept for the video was written by Fazer. The video depicts Fazer being kidnapped by a group of girls, and then detained in a cell. He then goes wild whilst trying to free himself from a straitjacket.

== Charts ==
Chart (2012)	Peak position
UK Singles (OCC)	17

== Release history ==
Region	Date	Format	Label
United Kingdom	26 August 2012	Digital download	All Around the World; Universal Island Records
