= Feva Las Vegas =

Single by N-Dubz

from the album Uncle B
- B-side: "N-Dubz vs. NAA"
- Released: 14 May 2007
- Recorded: 2006
- Genre: British hip hop; grime
- Length: 4:22
- Label: LRC; All Around the World
- Songwriter(s): Richard Rawson; Dino Contostavlos; Tula Contostavlos
- Producer(s): Richard Rawson; Dino Contostavlos

N-Dubz singles chronology
"I Swear" (2006)	"Feva Las Vegas" (2007)	"Ouch" (2008)

"Feva Las Vegas" is the third single by English hip hop trio, N-Dubz. The song was included on their debut album Uncle B. This song, along with "We Dance On", were the only singles not to be featured on the band's 2011 Greatest Hits album.

== Track listing ==
- CD single
1. "Feva Las Vegas"
2. "N-Dubz vs. NAA"
- Digital Download
1. "Feva Las Vegas"
2. "N-Dubz vs. NAA"
3. "Feva Las Vegas" (Instrumental)
4. "Feva Las Vegas" (A cappella version)

== Charts ==
Chart (2008)	Peak Position
UK Singles (OCC)	57
