= Charmer (N-Dubz song) =

Single by N-Dubz
- Released: 19 May 2022
- Genre: Afroswing; UK rap
- Length: 3:08
- Label: Xploded
- Songwriters: Costadinos Contostavlos; Richard Rawson; Tula Contostavlos; Junior Edwards; Rodney Hwingwiri
- Producer: Rymez

N-Dubz singles chronology
"Morning Star" (2011)	"Charmer" (2022)	"February" (2023)

"Charmer" is a song by English hip hop trio N-Dubz. The song was written by the trio, Junior Edwards, and its producer Rymez. On 19 May 2022, "Charmer" premiered on BBC Radio 1Xtra and was released to streaming services through Xploded Music. It is N-Dubz's first single following an 11-year hiatus.

== Background and release ==
On 16 May 2022, a 40-second teaser trailer was shared on N-Dubz's social media showing the trio flying in a helicopter over London; as they emerge after landing, a snippet of "Charmer" is played.

== Composition ==
"Charmer" combines Afrobeats with modern UK rap through use of Auto-Tune-heavy melodies and "breezy" production.

== Charts ==
Chart performance for "Charmer"
Chart (2022)	Peak position
UK Singles (OCC)	32
UK Indie (OCC)	1
UK Hip Hop/R&B (OCC)	13
