= Being... N-Dubz =

- Being... N-Dubz Title Card
- Starring: N-Dubz
- Country of origin: United Kingdom
- No. of seasons: 2
- No. of episodes: 13

Production
- Running time: 30 minutes

Original release
- Network: 4Music
- Release: 21 June 2010 – 18 May 2011

Being... N-Dubz is a documentary series detailing the life and times of English hip-hop group N-Dubz. The series was sponsored by Adidas Originals, and broadcast on 4Music and Channel 4 from 21 June 2010 to 18 May 2011. Two seasons of the show were broadcast. The second series focuses on the group as they travel to America to meet with top American producers. The second series premiered on Channel 4 on 13 April 2011. The series was narrated by Loose Women panelist Lynda Bellingham. The first series of the show was released on DVD on 24 September 2012.

== Episodes ==
=== Series 1 ===
- Episode 1 (21 June 2010): Dappy, Tulisa and Fazer take a trip down memory lane, comfort crying fans at a book signing, and narrowly avoid a punch up at the Celebrity Soccer Six football tournament with Lee Ryan, Gordon Smart, Nathalie Emmanuel, Jamie Archer, Danyl Johnson and Lethal Bizzle.
- Episode 2 (28 June 2010): The group go to a country recording studio where they lay down a new single with Mr Hudson, and Dappy gets a visit from his son, Gino. Later, Tulisa acts alongside Rochelle from The Saturdays in a new Brit flick, Bulla, later released as Big Fat Gypsy Gangster, before finding herself in a compromising position at a gig in London.
- Episode 3 (5 July 2010): The band prepare for a trip abroad, but there's trouble in store when Dappy goes missing at the airport. Can they find him in time for their concert in Greece? Tulisa vents her anger after being thrown into the sea by the boys, and then ditches the band for a break in Ibiza, where chills out with her friends.
- Episode 4 (12 July 2010): The band run riot on the T4 set, and later have a bust-up in Greece over the lyrics of a new track. Tulisa regrets asking the boys to help paint her home, the group go to the Glastonbury Festival, and Dappy makes peace with the police.
- Episode 5 (19 July 2010): Tulisa learns how to ride a horse, and later turns her hand to boxing - much to her friends' dismay. Dappy and Fazer consider buying a house in the country, and the band perform at the T4 on the Beach festival.
- Episode 6 (26 July 2010): A look back on the highlights of the series, including a row in Greece involving the lyrics to a new track, and memorable appearances at the T4 on the Beach and Glastonbury festivals.
- Episode 7 - Christmas Special (6 December 2010): The group prepare for the release of their third album, present at the Mobo Awards and perform at T4's Stars of 2010. Fazer helps Dappy pick out Christmas presents at Hamleys with his girlfriend Kaye and his son, Gino. Tulisa goes shopping for gifts to give to young hospital patients. Also, Dappy has a forty-five-minute deadline to work out the band's album track listing, but is easily distracted from the task in hand by his remote control plane.

=== Series 2 ===
- Episode 1 (13 April 2011): The band take a trip to America to work with some top American producers. Tulisa and Fazer travel to New York, taking in the sights, later catching up with Tinie Tempah at his gig, before heading out to join Dappy in the West Coast after he arrives late due to illness.
- Episode 2 (20 April 2011): The band are still enjoying their time in Los Angeles, working in the studio and soaking up the lifestyle. Fazer hires the car of his dreams; the band have their first meeting with the vice president Def Jam records; and Tulisa wows the LA paparazzi as she hits the red carpet. When the vice president invites the band to a party at the Paramount Pictures studios, only Tulisa turns up, as Dappy and Fazer refuse to go, and decide to record a new song in the studio instead.
- Episode 3 (27 April 2011): Still on their LA mission, the trio head to the studio to create their 'three minutes of magic'. With manager Jonathan keeping close tabs, do they have what it takes? Later, Dappy shows his emotional side. The band later take a trip to Universal Studios, and Tulisa is mistaken for someone in Jersey Shore. The band later visit Venice Beach.
- Episode 4 (4 May 2011): The band head back to the United Kingdom to promote and audition dancers for their first nationwide arena tour, the Love.Live.Life tour. Dappy reveals a new tattoo, and Tulisa visits a beauty salon.
- Episode 5 (11 May 2011): With the Isle of Wight Festival on the horizon, Dappy gets struck down with a mystery bug, and Fazer misplaces the band's performance disc. With time running out, will they make it to the performance?
- Episode 6 (18 May 2011): All of the series highlights, showing Dappy, Tulisa and Fazer's time in America... and beyond, including a fall-out with the vice president of Def Jam records, and a catch-up with Tinie Tempah at his gig.
