= Timeless (N-Dubz album) =

Studio album by N-Dubz
- Released: 4 August 2023
- Recorded: 2019–2023
- Studio: Grouse Lodge Recording Studio; Otterhead Studios; Westpoint Studios; Sarm Music Village
- Genre: R&B
- Length: 48:38
- Label: EMI
- Producer: Fazer; Junior Edwards; LiTek; Whyjay; Rvchet

N-Dubz chronology
Greatest Hits (2011)	Timeless (2023)

Singles from Timeless
- 1. "February" Released: 27 April 2023; 2. "Habibti" Released: 8 June 2023; 3. "The Ick" Released: 29 June 2023

Professional ratings
Review scores
Source	Rating
i	2/5 stars
The Independent	7/10 stars

Timeless is the fourth studio album by English hip-hop trio N-Dubz. It was released on 4 August 2023 by EMI. It is the first album from the group in over 13 years.

== Background and singles ==
On 16 May 2022, following an 11-year hiatus, the band announced their reunion for an UK arena tour that year. An accompanying single titled "Charmer" was released on 19 May, reaching the top 40 of the Official UK Charts. However, it did not make the album cut.

The lead single "February" was released on 27 April 2023, their first single since signing a global deal with EMI Records. The trio announced the album on 8 June 2023 and released an album trailer. They also shared the second single "Habibti" that day. N-Dubz began recording again in 2017, while the earliest track on the record stems from 2019. They continued working on it until its release in 2023. Half of the album was recorded at Grouse Lodge Recording Studio in the Republic of Ireland. According to Fazer, the album touches on "so many different situations that are relevant to today". Dappy added that the record tackles issues such as depression, mental health and "everything that happened through COVID".

In July 2023, the trio announced a "personal" and "up close" tour to support the record in August 2023. On August 8, the album reached number one on the iTunes Album Charts.

== Track listing ==
No.	Title	Writer(s)	Producer(s)	Length
1.	"Intro"	N-Dubz; Zachary Adam Steiner-Anderson; Junior Edwards; Dereen Jafar	Fazer	1:49
2.	"The Streets"	N-Dubz; Lewis Rawson; Steiner-Anderson; Edwards; Jafar	Fazer	3:00
3.	"Play Your Part"	N-Dubz; Rawson; Steiner-Anderson; Edwards; Jafar	Junior Edwards	2:59
4.	"February"	N-Dubz; Rawson; Steiner-Anderson; Edwards	Fazer; Edwards	3:40
5.	"The Ick"	N-Dubz; Whyjay; LiTek; Rawson; Steiner-Anderson; Edwards; Stephanie Fletcher Goudie	Whyjay; LiTek	3:03
6.	"Indecisive"	N-Dubz; Edwards	Fazer	2:51
7.	"Habibti"	N-Dubz; Whyjay; LiTek; Rawson; Steiner-Anderson; Edwards; Jafar; Goudie	Whyjay; LiTek	3:13
8.	"Interlude"	N-Dubz; Whyjay; LiTek; Rawson; Steiner-Anderson; Edwards; Goudie	Whyjay; LiTek	1:52
9.	"Listen"	N-Dubz; Edwards	Edwards	4:39
10.	"London"	N-Dubz; Rawson; Steiner-Anderson; Kyle Burns; Edwards; Goudie	Fazer	3:33
11.	"The Lights"	N-Dubz; Rawson; Edwards	Fazer	3:43
12.	"Believe Me Now"	N-Dubz; Rawson; Steiner-Anderson; Edwards; Jafar	Fazer	3:23
13.	"Vendetta"	N-Dubz; Rawson; Steiner-Anderson; Kyle Burns; Edwards; Olivia Williams	Fazer	3:42
14.	"Real"	N-Dubz; Rawson; Kyle Burns; Edwards; Rvchet	Rvchet	3:17
15.	"Trust No One (Tour Bus Freestyle)"	N-Dubz; Rawson; Edwards	Fazer; Edwards	2:46
16.	"Outro"	N-Dubz; Steiner-Anderson; Edwards	Fazer	1:08

== Charts ==
Chart performance for Timeless
Chart (2023)	Peak position
Scottish Albums (OCC)	3
UK Albums (OCC)	6
UK R&B Albums (OCC)	1
