= We Dance On =

2010 single by N-Dubz

Single by N-Dubz featuring Bodyrox

from the album Love.Live.Life and StreetDance (Music From & Inspired by the Original Motion Picture)
- B-side: "Strong Again"
- Released: 20 May 2010
- Length: 3:07
- Label: All Around the World
- Songwriter(s): Dino Contostavlos; Tula Contostavlos; Richard Rawson; Jon Pearn; Nick Bridges; Luciana Caporaso; Nick Clow; Johann Pachelbel
- Producer(s): Bodyrox

N-Dubz singles chronology
"Say It's Over" (2010)	"We Dance On" (2010)	"Best Behaviour" (2010)

Bodyrox singles chronology
"Shut Your Mouth" (2009)	"We Dance On" (2010)	"Throw the Paint" (2010)

Music video
- "We Dance On" on YouTube

"We Dance On" is a song performed by British hip hop group N-Dubz, released as the group's eleventh overall single and the lead single from their third studio album, Love.Live.Life. The song was also the second single released from the soundtrack to the film StreetDance 3D. The song features English house music duo Bodyrox. The song was co-written and co-produced by the members of N-Dubz and Bodyrox. Additional vocals are provided by British recording artists Luciana and Nick Clow, both artists have also been credited as being involved in co-writing the song.

"We Dance On" was released on 20 May 2010 in Ireland and on 23 May 2010 in the United Kingdom, accompanied by a previous N-Dubz single "Strong Again" as its B-side. The song was written to portray dancing as a metaphor for working through the trials and tribulations of everyday life. Its lyrics evoke a message of resilience, overcoming prejudices and maintaining faith to pursue your dreams. "We Dance On" received positive reviews for its warm, inspirational, diverse and urban pop nature.

The song reached the top 10 in Ireland, the United Kingdom and the UK R&B Chart. It is N-Dubz's highest-peaking single in Ireland, second highest-peaking single in the United Kingdom and eighth top-10 hit on the UK R&B Chart. Despite reaching the top 10, the song missed out a place on N-Dubz's Greatest Hits album. The accompanying music video does not feature N-Dubz or Bodyrox but teenagers and young children star in resemblance of N-Dubz. N-Dubz performed the song on television programme The Dome in Stuttgart, Germany.

== Background ==
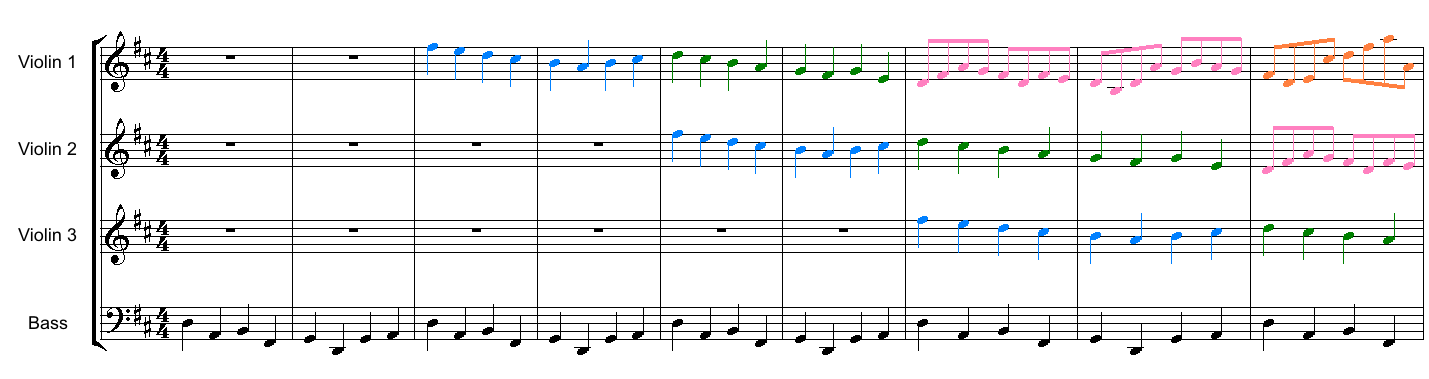
The first nine measures of the "Canon in D Major" which "We Dance On" samples. The violins play a three-voice canon over the ground bass which provides the harmonic structure. Colours highlight the individual canonic entries.

"We Dance On" was released as the official second theme from the film StreetDance 3D, following "Candy" by Aggro Santos featuring Kimberly Wyatt, and was also the first consecutive single from Love.Live.Life. The song is played at the end of the film with The Surge, played by Flawless, and The Breakpoint, played by Diversity, dancing out to it. "We Dance On" was co-written and co-produced by the members of N-Dubz and Bodyrox. The song features additional vocals and co-writing contributions from British recording artist Luciana and her partner Nick Clow. The Canon in D Major was sampled as the song's string section and orchestral backing to add "classical spice" to the diverse nature of musical styles incorporated in "We Dance On". The song was written to capture the euphoria of StreetDance 3D by lyrically being about overcoming prejudices and pursuing your dreams. While musically, the song was written to incorporate a diverse variety of styles in the same way the film incorporates a diverse variety of dance and musical styles. American singer Luciana recorded her own version of the song, which can be heard on the movie's official website. "We Dance On" was first released in Ireland on 20 May 2010, via digital download. A physical CD release was planned for 24 May 2010 in the United Kingdom. The CD single, however, failed to surface, and instead the single was released as a digital download only on 23 May 2010. A CD single was eventually released in Germany on 28 May.

== Composition ==
"We Dance On" has a distinctly faster tempo than previous N-Dubz singles. The song opens with the Baroque-styled string section sample which transitions into Dappy saying the N-Dubz trademark line "Na-na-nai". Tulisa is the most prominent contributor to the vocals in the song, with her verse "Fox on a mission" being said by critics as one of the highlights in the track. "We Dance On" was described by Gavin Martin of the Daily Mirror as having "unifying floorfiller" and crowd-pleasing attributes to it. The song's chorus "I know everything's gonna be alright/Now you're standing here by my side" and chants have been likened to the music released by reggae musician Bob Marley, namely his song "No Woman, No Cry" (1974). The sampled string section has also been interpreted as having influences from The Farm's "All Together Now" (1990). "We Dance On" is set in the time signature of common time with a metronome of 156 beats per minute. It is composed in the key of D minor. The song's backing string section follows a chord progression of D-A-Bm-F♯m-G-D-G-A. Lyrically, "We Dance On" is written in the first person and contains a theme of resilience. The track was inspired to portray dancing as a metaphor for working through the trials and tribulations of everyday life. The track refers to overcoming prejudices and maintaining faith to pursue your dreams.

== Chart performance ==
"We Dance On" debuted on 27 May 2010 on the Irish Singles Chart at number nine. It was the second highest new entry for the week behind Eminem's "Not Afraid" which debuted at number three. The single became N-Dubz' first top ten hit and highest-charting single in Ireland to-date. It went on to spend a total of six weeks on the chart after dropping out the chart's top fifty on 8 July 2010. On 5 June 2010, "We Dance On" debuted at number six on the UK Singles Chart. It in turn became N-Dubz' second highest-charting single as solo artists to date, behind "I Need You" which debuted at number five in 2009. The single spent two weeks within the top ten after dropping to number eight the following week. It has since spent a total of eight weeks within the top forty and nine weeks within the top seventy-five.

== Music video ==
N-Dubz as kids in the video.

The video takes place in a dance hall. There are teenagers and young children that resemble N-Dubz. The actual group do not have a physical appearance in the video. A young boy, (Akai Osei), that has a small part in the movie tries to join their dance crew but he is ignored because they are all watching an older boy street dance. The younger boy sits by himself and eventually gets up and starts street dancing by himself, the members of the dance crew see him and decide to watch him dance instead. The older boy shakes his hands and everyone starts cheering. Scenes from the movie are shown throughout the video, including Britain's Got Talent winners, Diversity and George Sampson and also contestants Flawless.

== Critical reception ==
Professional ratings
Review scores
Source	Rating
Digital Spy	4/5 stars
BBC	4/5 stars
Daily Mirror	3/5 stars

Robert Copsey of Digital Spy gave "We Dance On" a four out of five rating. He felt that when N-Dubz teamed up with Bodyrox for their soundtrack contribution to StreetDance 3D, they clearly took on board what the film was all about: overcoming prejudices and, the merging of diverse styles of music and dance. Copsey said, "Much like the film itself, 'We Dance On' features an assortment of different influences that might seem contradictory on paper, but inevitably work out for the best in the end." He noted that the verses about pursuing your dreams like a "fox on a mission" and "the big, Bob Marley-inspired chorus – "I know everything's gonna be alright/Now you're standing here by my side" will surely tug at the heartstrings of the song's listener. Copsey went on to say that the track "leaves you feeling warm, fuzzy and [...] better inside." BBC's Fraser McAlpine felt that "We Dance On" was capable of bringing its listener to tears with, "massive churning string section" from Johann Pachelbel's "Canon in D Major" and few "everything's gonna be alright" chants. McAlpine noted that the string section contains influences from The Farm's "All Together Now" (1990). He went on to interpret the song's chants as being inspired by Bob Marley's "No Woman, No Cry" (1974). Gavin Martin of the Daily Mirror gave "We Dance On" three out of five stars in his review of the single. He highlighted Tulisa Contostavlos' contribution in the song, saying: "Often forced to take a back seat while her male counterparts lead, N-Dubz' front lady Tulisa comes out front for this". Martin went on to describe the song as a "crowd-pleasing and unifying floor filler with a hint of classical spice."

== Track listing ==
- Digital download, German CD Single
1. "We Dance On" – 3:06
2. "Strong Again" (Dino Contostavlos, Tulisa Contostavlos, Richard Rawson, Fraser T Smith, Kieran Rogers) – 3:14

== Charts ==
Chart (2010)	Peak position
Ireland (IRMA)	9
Scotland (OCC)	6
UK Singles (OCC)	6
UK Hip Hop/R&B (OCC)	5

== Certifications ==
Certifications and sales for "We Dance On"
Region	Certification	Certified units/sales
United Kingdom (BPI)	Silver	200,000^{‡}
^{‡} Sales+streaming figures based on certification alone.

== Release history ==
Region	Date	Format	Label
Ireland	20 May 2010	Digital download	All Around the World
United Kingdom	23 May 2010	Digital download	All Around the World
Germany	28 May 2010	CD single	All Around the World
