= Haverstock School =

Coordinates: 51.544842°N 0.154355°W

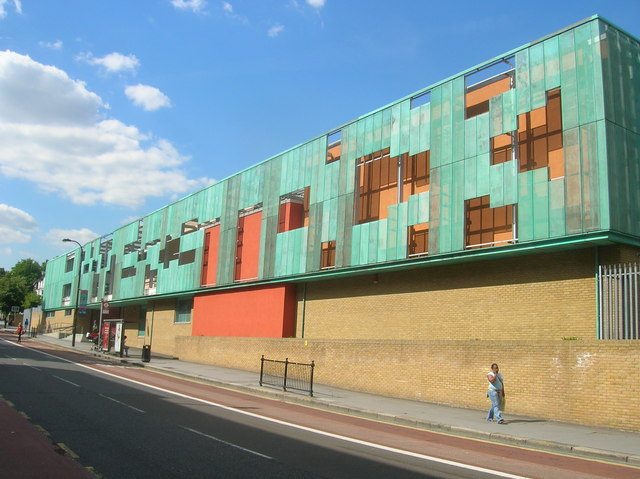

Location
- 24 Haverstock Hill; Chalk Farm, London, NW3 2BQ; England

Information
- Type: Community school
- Motto: 'Always Learning'
- Local authority: Camden
- Department for Education URN: 100049 Tables
- Ofsted: Reports
- Executive Headteacher: Nicholas John
- Gender: Coeducational
- Age: 11 to 19
- Enrolment: 1,252
- Publication: Haverstock News
- Website: https://www.haverstock.camden.sch.uk/

Haverstock School (formerly Haverstock Comprehensive School and Haverstock Hill School), is a coeducational comprehensive secondary school and sixth form located on Haverstock Hill in Haverstock, London, England. It is opposite Chalk Farm Underground station, and bounded by Prince of Wales Road and Crogsland Road.

== History ==
The original school buildings were completed by 1874. The school later became a comprehensive after World War II.

The school is Camden's first private finance initiative (PFI) school and underwent a £21 million re-build in 2006.

== Standards ==
An Ofsted inspection in 2008 resulted in a judgement of Good, and that of 2017 as requiring improvement. It then achieved a result of Good following a further inspection.

In 2018, 66% of students achieved a grade 4 (equivalent to the old C) in Maths and English—an improvement from the previous year's 31% result.

== Notable alumni ==
- John Barnes – England football international
- Tom Bentley – Politician and author
- Joe Cole – England football international
- Tulisa Contostavlos, Dino Contostavlos and Richard Rawson – N-Dubz group members
- John Duffy and David Mulcahy – rapists and serial-killers
- Julian Doyle – film-maker
- Jermaine Eluemunor – American football player for the New York Giants
- Michael Gothard – actor
- Marlon Harewood – Footballer
- Nelufar Hedayat – presenter
- Zoë Heller – journalist and Booker-prize shortlisted novelist.
- Oona King – Labour politician
- Steve McFadden – actor
- David Miliband – Former Labour Party politician, former Foreign Secretary
- Ed Miliband – Former Leader of the Labour Party
- Charlie Sloth – DJ and radio presenter
- Ben Wheatley – Film Director
- Daniel Woodgate – Drummer for English Ska band Madness
