= Girls (N-Dubz song) =

Single by N-Dubz

from the album Love.Live.Life
- Released: 12 December 2010
- Genre: Hip hop; R&B
- Length: 2:50
- Label: AATW; Island; Def Jam
- Songwriter(s): Dino Contostavlos; Tula Contostavlos; Richard Rawson; Jim Jonsin; Zachary Adam Steiner-Anderson
- Producer(s): Jim Jonsin

N-Dubz singles chronology
"Best Behaviour" (2010)	"Girls" (2010)	"Stuttering" (2011)

"Girls" is a song by British hip hop group N-Dubz. It is the third overall single taken from their third studio album, Love.Live.Life. The single was released as a digital download on 12 December 2010. The song was produced by Jim Jonsin and written by Tulisa, Dappy and Fazer, Jim Jonsin, Danny Morris, and Zachary Steiner Anderson. The single debuted on the UK Singles Chart on 5 December 2010, peaking at #23, based entirely on downloads from the album.

== Music video ==
The music video premiered on T4 on 5 December 2010. The video begins with Dappy sitting on a throne, girls queue up two by two to kiss him. We see the group singing in front of lights throughout the video. The screen cuts to Dappy with a girl with snow falling on them. After the first chorus, Tulisa is seen playing poker with a group of men, she wins the game and kisses the female dealer, who is in fact Lady Ny, a fellow singer and one of Tulisa's best friends. Fazer is then seen in front of the same backdrop as the single cover, four screens with women dancing behind them. Skepta makes a cameo in the video wearing a Boy Better Know chain. The clean version has alternate shots for when the profanity words are edited out.

== Track listing ==
- Digital download
1. "Girls" (Clean Radio Edit)
2. "Girls" (Jupiter Ace Remix)
3. "Girls" (Explicit Colorz A.M. Mix)
4. "Girls" (Ultrabeat Extended Mix)
5. "Girls" (Clean Colorz A.M. Mix)
6. "Girls" (Robsta & Oxide Remix)
7. "Girls" (Mazer Mix)
- CD single
1. "Girls" (Clean Radio Edit)

== Charts ==
Chart (2010)	Peak position
Ireland (IRMA)	48
Scotland (OCC)	22
UK Hip Hop/R&B (OCC)	4
UK Singles (OCC)	18
UK Singles Downloads (OCC)	18
