= Ouch (song) =

Single by N-Dubz

from the album Uncle B
- Released: 29 September 2008
- Genre: R&B
- Length: 3:57
- Label: All Around the World
- Songwriter(s): Dino Contostavlos; Tula Contostavlos; Richard Rawson
- Producer(s): Richard Rawson; Dino Contostavlos

N-Dubz singles chronology
"Feva Las Vegas" (2007)	"Ouch" (2008)	"Papa Can You Hear Me?" (2008)

Music video
- "Ouch" on YouTube

"Ouch" is a song performed, written and produced by the English hip hop group N-Dubz. It was released as the group's fourth overall single, first single with the record label All Around the World and the first official single for their debut Platinum-selling album, Uncle B.

== Background ==
Joseph says this single was the first digitally released on 29 September 2008 and then received as a physical single the following week. The CD single features six different versions of the song, including three remixes. "Ouch" has been defined as the response single to the group's second single "I Swear" as both songs deal with the issue of cheating within a relationship. The key difference between the two tracks is that "Ouch" involves the man in the relationship cheating whereas in "I Swear" it's the woman. In contrast the track's accompanied music video, which leaked four month's prior to the song's single release, tells the same story as the song lyrics. The song reached the B-list on BBC Radio 1. The single reached a peak of #22 on the UK Singles Chart making it the second consecutive single by the group to peak within the top thirty. "Ouch" combines elements of pop, British hip hop as well as R&B or blue-eyed soul. The song is accompanied by backing that combines both a violin and a piano melody. As with all N-Dubz songs, it was penned by the group themselves with group member, Fazer being credited for its production. The song is slow to mid-paced and features Tulisa taking on high and emotive vocals throughout the song. Dappy raps in the verses with Fazer rapping towards the end. The whole structure of the track revolves around a call-and-response argument between two lovers who in this case are played by the group members. The track is also significantly different from other N-Dubz songs in the sense that the song is opened with Tulisa singing the first verse as opposed to their regular tradition of Dappy opening the song rapping. The group planned on releasing the track much earlier than they did, but due to conflict with previous label Polydor Records they were unable to until they were signed with All Around the World.

We came to a standstill after the MOBO’s because we were having problems with the label and we weren’t agreeing on the path they chose for us. We kept bringing them singles like Ouch and they said ‘No, we don’t like it!’ and they kept trying to put us with new writers, with new producers. It was like – if you want to start doing this to us, you might as well get three little kids off the street and re-make them because that’s not why we came here.

The song's concept involves a real story of infidelity where Tulisa plays the role of the girl being cheated on by her boyfriend, which in the song's storyline is played by Dappy. Tulisa elaborated on the song's concept in an interview with FemaleFirst:

Ouch is a part two to I Swear, and it's basically the other way round to I Swear, it's me being a girl, coming home, finding my boyfriend cheating on me. And then Dappy and Fazer come from a boys point of view and they're sort of asking for me back, "it's not my fault", that kind of business. It's all about a whole debate between a woman and man after finding out the mans cheated. It's just a whole storyline, the whole aftermath of it. The video's got a whole storyline too that people can relate to.

An exclusive acoustic performance of "Ouch" was performed by the group in bathroom showroom for BBC Switch's program "Sound." The acoustic version was later made available for download on iTunes during the single's promotion period before the release of "Papa Can You Hear Me?" "Ouch" is featured as track number fourteen on the setlist for the group's "Uncle B Tour." The Jorg Schmid remix of "Ouch" features as track number three on disc number two on the compilation album "Clubland 14". The lyric "My name is Shanikwa and what?" became so much of a popular catchphrase among the group's fans that it was imprinted and made available on specialised T-shirts for fans to wear.

== Reviews ==
Fraser McAlpine of the BBC Chart Blog reviewed the song, "The focal point of the song, and the reason why it does not suck (if that is what you believe to be true), is the story and the way they deliver each line as if they actually are the people in the song. He went on to elaborate on the levels of passion, fire and proper acting included in it." IndieLondon reviewed the song: "A big Kiss FM anthem, N-Dubz Ouch begins as a moody slice of smooth groove R’n’B before trading boy-girl raps over a story of bickering lovers. A thumping back beat adds atmosphere, some shameless "ah ah ha"’s bring pop credibility, but the gritty, urban style of the vocals lend it a much harder edge". Urbanreview.co.uk complimented it as a "banger" of a song with a "solid" music video. Subba-cultcha.com described the track as "Glossy R&B balladery."

== Music video ==
The music video was released on to YouTube on 21 May 2008 and it was directed by George Burt. On 30 September 2008 an unedited version hit the popular video sharing site YouTube. The video begins with Dappy in a romantic setting with another woman whilst Tulisa is seen walking toward the house with a large suitcase after arriving from tour. Another scene then features all group members standing side-by-side in a black room with white and blue neon lights. Tulisa is visible singing on a balcony which looks over the city as wind blows through her hair. After entering the house, Tulisa walks up the staircase as she sings and uses hand gestures to perform the 'One step, two step, three step, four' lyric. She then walks into her bedroom only to find her boyfriend (not Fazer) in their bed with another woman, the woman then gets upset and shouts "Name's Shaniqua and what?" which has become a famous catchphrase for N-Dubz. Her boyfriend and Tulisa then start pushing each other around out of frustration from the situation. Tulisa starts throwing house objects at Fazer, who wears numerous types of outfits throughout the music video. Dappy is also seen performing on a rooftop. In the next scene, Tulisa takes her bag and gets into the car and starts driving whilst Fazer is holding onto the car, upset, and trying to stop her from driving away. As a result, Dappy has another new woman visit him and a romantic situation then occurs between the two of them as Shanikwa walks in on them with a response of anger. The second woman can also be seen slapping Dappy. In another scene, Tulisa can be seen singing whilst another man holds her. Tulisa also takes on a pair of black sunglasses later on, in the scene with her singing on the balcony. Fazer is featured in scenes throughout the video, and he can also be seen being slapped for infidelity. The music video received a nomination at the 2008 Urban Music Awards for 'Best Music Video' alongside the likes of Tinchy Stryder and DJ Ironik.

== Track listing ==
UK CD Single / Digital Download

1. "Ouch" (Radio Edit) - 3:57
2. "Ouch" (Wideboys Full Club Mix) - 6:51
3. "Ouch" (Original Mix) - 3:57
4. "Ouch" (Martin K Remix) - 3:50
5. "Ouch" (Wideboys Bassline Mix) - 5:24
6. "Ouch" (Jorg Schmid Remix) - 5:23

== Chart performance ==
On 5 October 2008, the song entered the UK Singles Chart at #37 on downloads alone, upon its physical release it climbed to #22, the following week it fell 9 places to #31. The next week down to #38. It spent a total of 4 weeks inside the top 40. The song then went on to spend a further five more weeks in the top 75, totaling its charting period to nine weeks. It is so far the group's fourth most successful single to-date, with the singles: "Number 1," "I Need You" and "Papa Can You Hear Me?" all outperforming it chartswise.

Chart	Peak Position
UK Singles (OCC)	22

== Certifications ==
Region	Certification	Certified units/sales
United Kingdom (BPI)	Silver	200,000^{‡}
^{‡} Sales+streaming figures based on certification alone.
