= I Swear (N-Dubz song) =

2006 single by N-Dubz

Single by N-Dubz

from the album Uncle B
- B-side: "Manufactured Bands"
- Released: 12 September 2006
- Genre: British hip hop; grime
- Length: 4:04 (album version); 4:45 (explicit single version); 4:15 (clean single version)
- Label: LRC Records; Polydor Records
- Songwriter(s): Dino Contostavlos; Tula Contostavlos; Richard Rawson
- Producer(s): Dino Contostavlos; Junior Edwards; Richard Rawson

N-Dubz singles chronology
"You Better Not Waste My Time" (2006)	"I Swear" (2006)	"Feva Las Vegas" (2007)

"I Swear" is the second overall single released by English hip hop trio, N-Dubz under their self-funded record label. It was released on 12 September 2006 as their first mainstream release. The track later featured on the group's debut album, Uncle B, more than two years after the single was originally released.

== Background ==
"I Swear" was written, produced and released by N-Dubz during 2006. With Jamior Edwards being credited as the track's co-producer. The general style of the song is an upbeat hip-hop backing combined with the soulful vocals of Tulisa and the intensive rapping of Dappy forming an original British hip-hop grime track which's style is reflected in the forthcoming album tracks and singles that appeared on N-Dubz's debut album "Uncle B". The song prominently features the two more common participants of N-Dubz in the singing and rapping of their songs: Tulisa and Dappy, with Fazer featuring as backing vocals and/or grunting throughout the song as well as in the final verse where he raps about how he caught his girlfriend cheating on him when he arrived home from tour. The first verse is rapped by Dappy with Tulisa in backing. This follows onto a call and response chorus between both Dappy and Tulisa. Verse two is led by Tulisa with Dappy in backing and the track is called-out with N-Dubz's signatures call-outs "It's N-Dubz N-Dubz, what ye, it's N-Dubz N-Dubz, two thousand and sexy naa naa nii" - rapped by Dappy and "Uh-oh uh-oh" sung by Tulisa. The song's general theme involves infidelity, a theme which is later followed on by the group's 2008 single "Ouch". The song, through its lyrics, tells a story about how a man discovers that after his girlfriend starts regularly giving him the cold shoulder that she's in fact cheating on him. It's mentioned that he sees his girlfriend kissing another guy under a bridge and when he arrives home from tour he suspiciously finds a pair of Nike shoes that don't belong to him whilst his girlfriend is at home. The story of the lyrics goes on into an argument between the couple and the girlfriend admits that she didn't go chillin' with her girl-friends but did, as accused cheat on him. She states her reason for this as him not giving her enough love and she however consistently apologizes to him through the progression of the song and its lyrics. "I Swear" has also been featured as the concert opening track on N-Dubz's setlist for their Uncle B Tour.

== Critical reception ==
Metro.co.uk mentioned "I Swear" as one of the stand-out tracks on Uncle B, describing it as an "indefility anthem with a clever touch". Ukmusic.com reviewed the single "I Swear" is set to ignite both underground and commercial radio alike. The track is very in your face with both Dappy and Fazer threatening the so-called 'cheater'. Tulisa however, neutralises "I Swear" with her melodic harmonies that overall make it a great tune to listen to. It certainly becomes catchier after multiple listens. Dappy's voice is truly amazing and edits a very comical essence into the chorus. Ciao.co.uk also positively reviewed the song, claiming it had a great beat and fantastic sound. N-Dubz's sound really comes into its own in this track. Their slightly crazy voices work so well on the chorus. A perfect mix of rap and vocals mean you don't get bored of it and it tells a great story of infidelity.

== Music video ==
The music video for "I Swear" premiered on YouTube on 22 November 2006. The music video begins with Tulisa lying in bed and Dappy strolling around the neighbourhood during the song's intro. It then moves onto Dappy being tied to a chair being teased by a girl, correlating with the lyrics "I miss the time when you would tie me to a chair, tease me from the back of my neck up to my ear". From this scene, which is repeated throughout the video in different ways, the video moves onto a scene under a bridge where a woman is kissing a man - correlating with the lyrics of Dappy's lines in the song. Furthermore, the scene then evolves into Dappy discovering the couple's secret at the scene of the crime, he is then angered by it and attacks the man. At the chorus of the song, the scene is shifted to in and around a city bridge. This is the setting for the majority of the video and mainly in the song's choruses. Tulisa then reappears wearing black sunglasses and white summer outfit. The scene is then shifted to a home for the second verse which is sung by Tulisa and features Tulisa pleading to her boyfriend and then also teasing him while he's tied to a chair. During Fazer's verse, the video showcases him walking into his home, arriving from tour, discovering a pair of Nike shoes which don't belong to him, whilst his girlfriend is in bed with another man. As Fazer walks up the stairs, his girlfriend tells the man in her bed to go hide. Just when she thinks her secret is safe, Fazer confronts her about the Nike shoes and an argument develops which later results in her secret being exposed. The chorus then features all three N-Dubz members performing on a bridge in a darker setting than that of the previous choruses in the video.

== Track listing ==
- CD Single
1. "I Swear" (Explicit Single Version) - 4:45
2. "You Better Not Waste My Time" - 5:13
3. "I Swear" (Clean Single Version) - 4:15
- Digital Download
1. "I Swear" (Explicit Single Version) - 4:45
2. "I Swear" (Clean Single Version) - 4:15
3. "You Better Not Waste My Time" - 5:13
4. "Manufactured Bands" - 4:11

== Chart performance ==
"I Swear" entered the UK Singles Chart in September 2006 at number 91 on downloads only, selling over 1,000 copies through word of 'cybermouth' only, this was the last and only week the single spent on the chart due to it having limited promotion and funding under LRC at the time. It did however become the group's first of fifteen top 100 hits on the chart and at the time was the group's highest charting single, outpeaking debut single "You Better Not Waste My Time"s peak of number 149 before it was re-released in 2007. The other seven singles released so far make up the other seven top 100 hits. "I Swear" holds the record so far as the group's least successful and lowest charting single to-date, the second lowest charting-single being "Wouldn't You" which has so far peaked at number 64, twenty-seven places higher than "I Swear".

=== Weekly charts ===
Chart (2006)	Peak position
UK Singles (OCC)	91

== Certifications ==
Region	Certification	Certified units/sales
United Kingdom (BPI)	Silver	200,000^{‡}
^{‡} Sales+streaming figures based on certification alone.
