= Morning Star (N-Dubz song) =

Single by N-Dubz

from the album Love.Live.Life
- Released: 14 March 2011
- Recorded: 2010
- Genre: R&B
- Length: 3:07
- Label: All Around the World; Island; Def Jam
- Songwriters: Jean-Baptiste; Ryan Buendia; Nick Marsh; Sylvia Gordon; Michael McHenry
- Producer: Free School

N-Dubz singles chronology
| "Stuttering" (2011) | "Morning Star" (2011) | "Charmer" (2022) |

Music video
- "Morning Star" on YouTube

"Morning Star" is a song by British hip hop group N-Dubz. It was the final song to be released following the announcement of their two-year hiatus confirmed by the members earlier that year. The song was released via digital download on 14 March 2011. The song was produced by Free School and written by Jean Baptiste, Nick Marsh, Ryan Buendia, S. Gordon and Michael McHenry.

== Composition ==
"Morning Star" was described in The Guardian as an R&B song. The beginning of the track samples "You Get What You Give" by the New Radicals.

== Music video ==
The "N-DUBZ" font as the rest of the screen is fading into the shot of the group's silhouettes at the beginning of the video "Morning Star".

The music video was uploaded to YouTube by All Around the World on 8 February 2011. The video begins with large text saying: "N-DUBZ" in capital letters, a change from their traditional logo. Inside it, we see a silhouette of the group and the rest of the screen fades to the shot, the silhouettes then fade into the full appearance of the group. The group sing in front of a plain backdrop, occasionally in front of special effects. Throughout the video, shots of space and shooting stars are seen, as well as a female dancer.

== Track listing ==
1. "Morning Star" (Radio Edit) – 3:07

== Credits and personnel ==
- Lead vocals – N-Dubz
- Producers – Free School
- Lyrics – Jean Baptiste, Ryan Buendia, Nick Marsh, S. Gordon, Michael McHenry
- Label: AATW, Island, Def Jam

== Charts ==
| Chart (2011) | Peak position |
|---|---|
| UK Hip Hop/R&B (OCC) | 15 |
| UK Singles (OCC) | 52 |
