= You Better Not Waste My Time =

"Better Not Waste My Time"

Single by N-Dubz

from the album Uncle B
- Released: 19 August 2006
- Recorded: 2006
- Genre: British hip hop
- Length: 3:40
- Label: Polydor
- Songwriter(s): Richard Rawson; Dino Contostavlos; Tulisa Contostavlos; Jack Freegard
- Producer(s): Dino Constostavlos; Richard Rawson; Jack Freegard

N-Dubz singles chronology
"Better Not Waste My Time" (2006)	"I Swear" (2006)

"You Better Not Waste My Time" also known as "Better Not Waste My Time" is the debut single by British MOBO-award winning hip hop group N-Dubz. It was released on 19 August 2006 as a digital download only single, whilst the group was still self-funded. It was then later re-released on 22 October 2007, this time with a physical release and under the group's new record label at the time – Polydor Records. The single was later featured on N-Dubz's Platinum-selling debut album Uncle B which was released in November 2008.

== Background ==
"You Better Not Waste My Time" is a mid-paced track which features an upbeat rhythm consisting of lightly placed keys, horns and strong bass. It is both written and produced by the group and Jack Freegard. The song features vocals and rapping by all three of N-Dubz's members: Dappy, Tulisa and Fazer. The song's intro and chorus are rapped by Dappy and Tulisa is involved in the backing vocals and reply verse of the song. The song then ends off with a verse rapped by Fazer. The general theme of the song is about growing up, the difficulties of it and how to use it to make you stronger. The lyrics involve stereotyping and the discriminating of "untalented" scholars or kids who never completed their school career. Examples of this include Dappy's verse, "Just because I neva went to school don't mean I can't be perfect". Tulisa's reply verse involves the difficulty that girls face during their school years and how jealousy more often than not results in conflict in competitive situations at school with lyrics such as "So much hate, lies an deceit" describing the extent of the conflict of these situations between girls at school. The second half of the song is aimed to inspiring the song's listener, from the personal experience of the group, to not take notice of the difficulties of life but rather to rise above it despite what people say. An example of this is found in the line "I love my Nike Air, but now movin onto Gucci and Prada". The single was released and re-released before making the group's debut album, "Uncle B" and therefore didn't have an effect on the album's sales which were first boosted by the group's later single "Ouch" in 2008. The re-release of the song featured a significantly shorter version of the original; the re-release version being 03:30 long and the original 05:10. Tulisa's view on the re-release of the song:

I think re-releasing "Better Not Waste My Time" was a mistake Polydor made because they weren't aiming at our main fanbase, they were reaching out for a new fanbase. It did gain us new fans, but at the same time, we missed out on how many thousands of fans we already had, because we didn't bring out a fresh track.

"You Better Not Waste My Time" is featured as the second track on N-Dubz's setlist for their Uncle B Tour.

== Reception ==
=== Critical ===
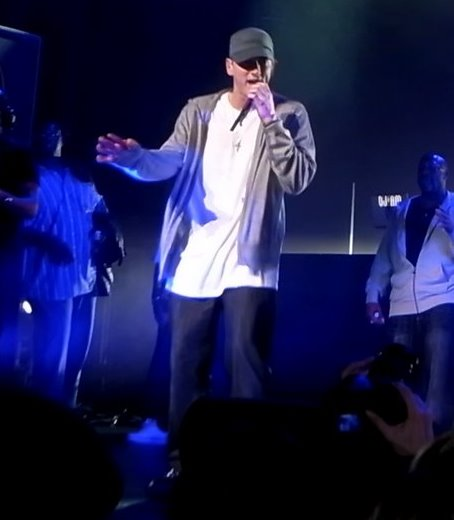
Digital Spy's Alex Fletcher compared Dappy's rapping on the track to that of American rapper Eminem (pictured).

A writer for the Manchester Evening News praised the track's slick production and deemed its central hook as "one to die for," adding, "This single has a real sense of urgency about it and gets right in your head within seconds." The writer went on to mention that the song's combination of rap and "superb vocals" is what lifts it as a complete product, concluding that Tulisa's Fergie-like harmony is the track's most essential component. The newspaper's writer was however critical of N-Dubz' sound, opining that they are a "teen version of The Black Eyed Peas" sonically, but, "You'd rather your kids listened to this than Samanda, surely?" Emma Warren from The Guardian positively reviewed "You Better Not Waste My Time" writing, "This pop-friendly slice of MC culture riffs on well trodden topics but it does so in such ebullient style that it hardly matters." Warren went on to highlight the song's target market, mentioning, "Currently being played at tinny top volume by kids on buses nationwide. Fraser McAlpine of the BBC felt that the song was "very good" and that he "will certainly be buying a copy [of the single]". Digital Spy's Alex Fletcher awarded "You Better Not Waste My Time" a three (out of five)-star rating, deeming the group's "cock-sure" attitude and bravado as one that "makes a refreshing change from the twee and retiring indie chaps that generally clog the nations airwaves." Fletcher felt that the song manifested the group's ear for a decent tune, adding, "The haunting piano line and reverberating bass thumps should find themselves on a million kids' ringtones." He went on to liken Dappy's rapping on the track to American rapper Eminem, writing, "the Eminem-aping rap patter is certainly impressive, even though it lacks the wit and intelligence of the US star." Fletcher was however critical of the song's lyrical content, opining, "the bitter lyrics about disparaging school teachers are not attractive, " and felt that the group's "brand of grimy, haunting garage is somewhere between the So Solid Crew, Blazin' Squad comic book gangster nonsense of a few years back and the far more acceptable sounds of UK hip-hop stars Kano and Sway."

=== Commercial ===
"You Better Not Waste My Time" originally peaked at number 141 on the UK Singles Chart on 11 November 2006, following its independent release on LRC Records. Upon its re-release through Polydor Records, the single re-entered the UK Singles Chart at number 96 on 27 October 2007, it then climbed 70 places to reach a peak of number 26 the following week, becoming N-Dubz' first top 40 hit in the United Kingdom. It spent a total of five consecutive weeks in the chart's top 100, and is now the trio's 11th highest-peaking single to-date.

== Music video ==
N-Dubz created two music videos for "You Better Not Waste My Time". The first and original video was self-funded by the group by themselves but as part of the single's re-release promotion under Polydor Records a new video was remade, making it the second and official music video for the track. The first was uploaded onto YouTube on 15 March 2007 and the second was uploaded onto YouTube on 22 September 2007. The first video is 5:18 long; the second video is considerably shorter at 3:40 long. The first video features Dappy in a series of comic costumes and all three members performing in a pool. The explicit version of the song is used in this version of the video. The second video starts off with a dancer dancing in the dark, then Dappy lighting a match. He then throws it away and you see that all members of N-Dubz are sitting on the floor. Dappy gets up and walks off, stage lights turn off and shows that some dancers are performing. It then goes pitch black and all you can see is Dappy. It then shows a person screaming on stage, then a ninja jumps down, then Dappy sits on a chair and gets touched up. Then it shows all three members of N-Dubz dancing together, then it goes pitch black and all you can see is Tulisa, then the stage lights turn on and you can see the performance on stage. Then it goes close to Tulisa who is sitting down, then she walks off, she joins the rest of N-Dubz, then it goes pitch black. Tulisa and Dappy walk off and you can only see Fazer, he then walks off. The stage lights come on and you can see the performance again, but then it goes dark. Then it shows Dappy with a teddy bear. Then it shows N-Dubz performing together, then it ends with them performing and the dancers dancing around them. Despite the single's limited commercial release in 2006, the music video spent seven weeks at No. 1 on the UK's Channel U.

== Track listing ==
- 2006 Digital Download
1. "You Better Not Waste My Time" – 5:10
- 2007 Digital Download / CD Single
1. "You Better Not Waste My Time" (2007 Edit) – 3:40
2. "You Better Not Waste My Time" (Naughty Boy Remix) – 3:24

== Charts ==
Chart (2006–07)	Peak position
UK Singles (OCC)	26
