= Papa Can You Hear Me? =

Single by N-Dubz

from the album Uncle B
- Released: 24 November 2008 (UK)
- Recorded: 2008
- Venue: Tools
- Genre: Pop-garage; hip hop; R&B
- Length: 4:02
- Label: All Around the World
- Songwriters: Richard Rawson; Dino Contostavlos; Tula Contostavlos
- Producers: Richard Rawson; Dino Contostavlos; Tula Contostavlos

N-Dubz singles chronology
| "Ouch" (2008) | "Papa Can You Hear Me?" (2008) | "Strong Again" (2009) |

Music video
- "Papa Can You Hear Me?" on YouTube

"Papa Can You Hear Me?" is a song by British hip hop trio, N-Dubz. The song is dedicated to the group's former manager Byron Contostavlos, who died shortly before the band were signed to new label All Around the World. The song later became their second top 40 hit in the UK.

== Critical reception ==
David Balls, writing for Digital Spy, wrote the following review: "N-Dubz seem proud to be a band who sell as many ringtones as they do actual tracks. 'Remember that boy driving you mad every morning on the No.42? He's listening to our music,' they proclaim on their MySpace page. Whether that's a good thing probably depends on your age, but anyone would find it tough to fathom the appeal of their latest pop-garage single. Though it feels a bit harsh to knock 'Papa Can You Hear Me', which is dedicated to the band's late relative and former manager Byron Contostavlos, N-Dubz push any goodwill to the limit here. The mix of uber-serious rapping and abrasive beats is fundamentally awkward, while their lyrics are as crass as they are heartfelt. By showing their softer side, the Camden collective are probably hoping to win some new fans, but they should probably stick to making hip-hop bangers in the futureside."

== Music video ==
The music video was premiered by the All Around the World label on their website on 13 October 2008. It includes Dappy holding onto a door knob after falling through singing in the air, Fazer running away and Tulisa floating in mid-air.

== Track listing ==
- Digital Download
1. "Papa Can You Hear Me?" (Album Version) - 4:02
2. "Papa Can You Hear Me?" (Single Version) - 4:07
3. "Papa Can You Hear Me?" (The Studio Allstars V Festival Tribute To N-Dubz) - 4:09
4. "Papa Can You Hear Me?" (Live From BBC Radio Live Lounge) - 4:33
- CD Single
1. "Papa Can You Hear Me?" (Album Version) - 4:02

== Charts ==
On 23 November 2008, the song entered the UK Singles Chart at #30 on downloads alone. It became their second biggest hit peaking at #19, and at number #17 in the download chart. Following the single's success, it started falling down the Top 40, before climbing to #33 again, and finally falling to #47, where it stayed for 2 weeks. The song also peaked at #3 on the official R&B chart.

| Chart (2008) | Peak Position |
|---|---|
| European Hot 100 Singles | 55 |
| UK Singles (Official Charts) | 19 |

=== Year-end charts ===
| Chart (2008) | Position |
|---|---|
| UK Singles (OCC) | 185 |
