= Against All Odds (N-Dubz album) =

Studio album by N-Dubz
- Released: 13 November 2009
- Recorded: 2008–2009
- Genre: Hip-hop; pop-rap; R&B
- Length: 44:23
- Label: All Around the World
- Producer: Fazer; Dappy; Junior Edwards; Fraser T. Smith; Evangelis Klemis

N-Dubz chronology
Uncle B (2008)	Against All Odds (2009)	Love.Live.Life (2010)

Singles from 'Against All Odds'
- 1. "I Need You" Released: 9 November 2009; 2. "Playing with Fire" Released: 18 January 2010; 3. "Say It's Over" Released: 19 April 2010

Against All Odds is the second studio album by English hip hop group N-Dubz. It was released in Ireland on 13 November 2009 and was released on 16 November 2009 in the UK.

== Background ==
Following the release of Uncle B (2008), Tulisa told the Daily Star: "We have just taken a quick break. We're having fun since our return to the studio, and the album is sounding good." She revealed that the group have adopted unusual work patterns while making the new record: "We normally work till 5am - I come alive at midnight, like a vampire." She added that the group had recorded a song called "Shoulda Put Something On", a track about teenage pregnancy, for the album. "It is about a young couple arguing whether to keep their unplanned baby. It's not something any of us have been through personally. But everyone knows someone who has. The three of us wrote down our different perspectives and we based the song around that. It's our favourite track on the album." The group were rumoured to be recording a song with Kylie Minogue for the album, after she expressed praise for their debut album Uncle B, however, Tulisa denied the rumours. The group announced that the album would be released on November 16, 2009, before revealing the album title. When covering for Semtex on BBC Radio 1Xtra, Fazer and Tulisa stated that their former manager, Dappy's father (Byron Contostavlos), wanted Against All Odds to be the title of their debut album, but after his death, they changed it to Uncle B in memory of him and so Against All Odds was the title for their second album. They also confirm this in the album booklet. The album includes six different collaborations, including an updated version of the Tinchy Stryder's single "Number 1". Stryder's first verse was kept, but new verses by Tulisa and Fazer were recorded. The album was mixed at The Chairworks in Castleford Yorkshire by Kelvin Avon. The album has sold over 200,000 copies.

== Critical reception ==
Professional ratings
Review scores
Source	Rating
AllMusic	3.5/5 stars
BBC	positive
Entertainment.ie	1/5 stars
The Guardian	3/5 stars
Digital Spy	4/5 stars
The Times	3/5 stars

The album had received mixed to positive reviews from critics. Entertainment.ie gave the album one star out of five. The review stated, "The problem is that their brand of music is such lowest-common-denominator stuff that it manages to offend even those that it's aimed at through its sheer awfulness. With a debut album ('Uncle B') that went platinum in less than a year, all the trio needed to do was write a quick follow-up to cash in on their popularity, and they’ve done exactly that. There's little creativity involved in these grimy tunes, smothered in layers of synthesized vocals and rapid-fire raps". The Guardian gave it a mainly positive review, although they felt the album was "hardly exploding with originality, and the various references to Facebook, their beef with Swag Blanket and how many records they've sold do grate". It finished by saying that "N-Dubz are bound to be inescapable in 2010 – most probably because they will be being blasted out of a mobile phone on the bus". Digital Spy gave the album a solid 4/5 review, stating "The Camden crew's impressive second album positions them at the forefront of British pop music".

== Track listing ==
Against All Odds
No.	Title	Writer(s)	Producer(s)	Length
1.	"Against All Odds" (Intro)	N-Dubz	Fazer; Dappy	0:59
2.	"I Need You"	N-Dubz	Fazer; Dappy	3:20
3.	"Playing with Fire" (featuring Mr Hudson)	N-Dubz; Benjamin McIldowie	Fazer; Dappy	3:47
4.	"Say It's Over"	N-Dubz; Junior Edwards	Fazer; Dappy; Edwards	3:44
5.	"Na Na" (featuring Wiley)	N-Dubz; Richard Cowie; Edwards	Fazer; Dappy; Edwards	3:31
6.	"Shoulda Put Something On"	N-Dubz	Fazer; Dappy	3:35
7.	"Duku Man" (featuring Fearless)	Dappy; Anthony Evoloko	Fazer; Dappy; Edwards	2:24
8.	"I Don't Wanna Go To Sleep"	N-Dubz	Fazer; Dappy	3:20
9.	"Suck Yourself" (featuring Chipmunk)	Dappy; Fazer; Jahmaal Fyffe	Fazer; Dappy; Edwards	4:24
10.	"No One Knows"	N-Dubz; Gary Barlow	Fazer; Dappy	3:23
11.	"Number 1" (featuring Tinchy Stryder)	N-Dubz; Kwasi Danquah	Fraser T Smith	3:33
12.	"Comfortable"	Tulisa Contostavlos	Fazer	4:08
13.	"Let Me Be" (featuring Nivo)	N-Dubz; Evangelis Klemis	Klemis	3:39
14.	"Against All Odds" (Outro)	N-Dubz	Fazer; Dappy	0:49

== Album booklet ==
The group confirmed in an interview that the booklet will include several features along with the album If a buyer logs on the "3D" page of the N-Dubz website and faces the back of the album booklet to their webcam, the trio will appear standing on the booklet and perform "I Need You". The group call the booklet a "N-Dubz magazine", which includes the following:

- Introduction
- N-Dubz Glossary
- Exclusive Interviews
- Tour Must Haves
- We Love Our Adidas
- N-Dubz Look
- Behind The Scenes ("I Need You" and "Playing With Fire")
- Thank You's
- Family Tree
- Private Picture Gallery
- Credits
- Lyrics

== Personnel ==
Credits for Against All Odds adapted from AllMusic.

- Tim Aluo – guitar
- Amir Amor – additional production, engineer, vocal engineer
- Kelvin "Afreex" Avon – engineer, mixing
- Gary Barlow – composer
- Jason Brooks – bass
- Rich Castillo – A&R, Management
- Chipmunk – composer
- Dino Contostavlos – composer, producer
- Tula Contostavlos – composer
- Dean Coulson – Assistant
- Kwasi Danquah – composer
- Junior Edwards – composer, producer
- Engine – Artwork – design
- Anthony Evolko – composer
- Aaron "Breakbeat" Fagan – drums
- Tom Fuller – bass Engineer, Drum Engineering, Engineer, Mixing, Piano, Vocal Engineer
- Simon Gogerly – mixing
- Evangelis Klemis – composer, producer
- Ian McManus – Photography
- Mr. Hudson – composer
- James Mottershead – assistant engineer, mixing assistant
- Ross 'Dights' Parkin – engineer
- Richard Rawson – composer, producer
- Harry Rutherford – editing, engineer, guitar engineer, vocal engineer
- Jonathan Shalit – Management
- Frasier T. Smith – composer, producer
- Adam Swales – drums

== Charts ==
=== Weekly charts ===
Chart (2009)	Peak position
Greek Albums (IFPI)	12
Irish Albums (IRMA)	39
Scottish Albums (OCC)	13
UK Albums (OCC)	6
UK R&B Albums (OCC)	4

=== Year-end charts ===
Chart (2009)	Position
UK Albums (OCC)	44

== Certifications ==
Region	Certification	Certified units/sales
United Kingdom (BPI)	Platinum	300,000^{^}
^{^} Shipments figures based on certification alone.
