= Strong Again =

2009 single by N-Dubz

Single by N-Dubz

from the album Uncle B
- Released: 9 February 2009
- Length: 3:14
- Label: All Around the World
- Songwriters: Dino Contostavlos; Richard Rawson; Tula Contostavlos; Fraser T. Smith; Kane Robinson
- Producers: Fraser T. Smith; Kane Robinson

N-Dubz singles chronology
"Papa Can You Hear Me?" (2008)	"Strong Again" (2009)	"Number 1" (2009)

"Strong Again" is a song by British hip hop trio, N-Dubz. It is the sixth single from their debut album Uncle B and was produced by Kano and Fraser T Smith. It was later the B-side to "We Dance On", which would eventually be the first single from their third studio album, Love.Live.Life. Both songs were included on the StreetDance Soundtrack. On 28 January 2009, the song was added to Radio 1's A-List, becoming their first single to do so. The single was released as a digital download on 9 February 2009. The song "Wouldn't You" was originally intended to be the sixth single, however, it was later released as the seventh single instead.

== Critical reception ==
David Balls of Digital Spy wrote: "If the frequency with which their Uncle B album ad gets repeated on TV is in any way indicative of the band's popularity, N-Dubz have a very promising future ahead of them. After a spluttering start that saw them win a MOBO, then get dropped and signed again, Tulisa, Fazer and Dappy have conquered the airwaves of late and are now aiming for a fourth consecutive top 30 hit. 'Strong Again' is another urban/pop crossover track that sounds like The Black Eyed Peas just bumped into Dizzee Rascal and got on like a house on fire. With tidier production than their earlier singles, this manages to sound accessible and radio-friendly without sacrificing its all-important street cred. Expect to hear it blasted at full volume from the back of the bus very soon. In the BBC Radio version the words "punch up" are removed from the opening line; one day i had to punch up this one youth. 3/5."

== Music video ==
A behind the scenes video was released in preparation. Since then, the video started receiving airplay on music channels. The music video was released on YouTube on 1 December 2008. The video starts showing a red "N-Dubz" logo with a black background. The song then starts and features the three of them performing on a centered stage. A DJ is seen playing their album, Uncle B. Dappy stage dives into the crowd. Some shots of the video cut to black and white. The video continues with all members dancing on the stage with Tulisa the star of the video.

== Track listing ==
- Digital download
1. "Strong Again" (Radio Edit) - 3:14
2. "Strong Again" (23 Deluxe Edit) - 3:32
3. "Strong Again" (23 Deluxe Remix) - 5:04
4. "Strong Again" (Jorg Schmid Remix) - 5:24
5. "Strong Again" (Priddy Remix) - 2:29
6. "Strong Again" (Ultrabeat Remix) - 5:00

== Charts ==
On 28 December 2008, the song entered the UK Singles Chart at number 138 on downloads alone and went in at number 40 due to album downloads, the day before the digital single was released. The song reached number 25 on downloads alone, as well as position 5 on the UK R&B Chart. On 7 March 2009 the song climbed up 1 place to a new peak of number 24.

Chart (2008–2009)	Peak position
Europe (European Hot 100 Singles)	75
Romania (Romanian Top 100)	63
UK Singles (OCC)	24

=== Year-end charts ===
Chart (2009)	Position
UK Singles (OCC)	140

== Certifications ==
Region	Certification	Certified units/sales
United Kingdom (BPI)	Silver	200,000^{‡}
^{‡} Sales+streaming figures based on certification alone.

== Release history ==
Region	Date	Label	Format
United Kingdom	4 February 2009	All Around the World	Digital Download
