= Playing with Fire (N-Dubz song) =

2010 single by N-Dubz

Single by N-Dubz featuring Mr Hudson

from the album Against All Odds
- Released: 18 January 2010
- Genre: Hip hop; R&B
- Length: 3:47
- Label: All Around the World
- Songwriters: Dino Contostavlos; Tula Contostavlos; Richard Rawson; Benjamin Hudson McIldowie
- Producers: Richard Rawson; Dino Contostavlos

N-Dubz singles chronology
"I Need You" (2009)	"Playing with Fire" (2010)	"Say It's Over" (2010)

Mr Hudson singles chronology
"Young Forever" (2010)	"Playing with Fire" (2010)	"Love Never Dies (Back for the First Time)" (2010)

Music video
- "Playing with Fire" on YouTube

"Playing with Fire" is a song by English hip-hop trio N-Dubz featuring English musician Mr Hudson. The song is the second single taken from N-Dubz' second album, Against All Odds. It is a rap song with lyrics about a girl realising that her boyfriend is cheating on her and trying to get him to confess. It shows both the man and the woman's point of view. It shows their communications with each other when the woman confronts the man.

== Background and release ==
Mr Hudson announced via his Facebook site that N-Dubz and he had recorded the song and shot the video. The single was to be released on 11 January but was pushed to 25 January because the previous date was the same as the single release of Mr Hudson's other collaboration with Jay-Z, "Young Forever". It was then pushed forward to 18 January.

== Critical reception ==
Nick Levine of Digital Spy gave the song a positive review. "Their Tinchy duet's been longlisted for Best British Single, but would it have killed the Brits panel to give N-Dubz a proper nod? After all, the Camden crew are now a sufficiently mainstream concern to count Gary Barlow as a songwriting partner, spearhead a charity single, and... erm... get themselves a ticking off from the School's Secretary. Anyway, a single like 'Playing with Fire' shows why they've risen from the pirates to the Radio1 A-list. With its catchy call-and-response chorus and easily relatable lyrics - Dappy plays the no-good-cheating-sod, Tulisa the smart cookie who calls him out - it's another contemporary pop cracker from the trio. Mr Hudson even turns up for a savvy bit of fanbase-mashing. Just one thing - in the light of recent events, it's hard not to fear for Tulisa's blood pressure when she starts singing about checking Dappy's texts. Let's be honest, That Other Woman could be the least of her worries..."

== Music video ==
From left to right: Dappy, Mr Hudson, Tulisa Contostavlos and Fazer.

The video was shot by production company LUT! MED!A and director RAGE in Central London near Tower Bridge. A few seconds of the video was shown on the album advert and images from the video and behind the scenes are featured on the album booklet. The video premiered on Clubland TV on 19 November 2009. All Around the World uploaded the video on their YouTube channel the next day. The video starts with skyscrapers and a transparent "N-Dubz" logo, it then reads "Playing with Fire" with the word "Fire" in a large font on fire. We then see each member of N-Dubz with their names on the screen, we then see Mr Hudson with "featuring Mr Hudson" on the screen, it uses Mr Hudson's official logo. The video cuts to N-Dubz and Mr Hudson performing in front of Tower Bridge throughout the video. Mr Hudson sings his verses in front of a set of telephone boxes. Dappy is then seen in an apartment cheating on his girlfriend and getting caught, his girlfriend walks out the room and is then seen crying. Tulisa is in a hotel room watching her boyfriend sleep, she then takes his phone and starts reading his texts, she looks disgusted then wakes her boyfriend up, they begin to fight and Tulisa storms out of the room and gets into a limo and begins to cry. Fazer is seen driving a car with a girl in the passenger seat, they begin to fight and Fazer rings up his mates G-RYD to help solve his issues. The video ends with the N-Dubz logo. As of November 2023, the video has had over 43 million views on YouTube.

== Track listing ==
- Digital download
1. "Playing With Fire" - 3:27
2. "Playing With Fire" (Cahill Radio Edit) - 3:41
3. "Playing With Fire" (Cahill Club Mix) - 6:59
4. "Playing With Fire" (Euphonix Mix) - 3:51
5. "Playing With Fire" (KJ's Groove Mix) - 4:37
6. "Playing With Fire" (Danny Bond Remix) - 5:25
- CD single
1. "Playing With Fire" - 3:27
2. "Playing With Fire" (KJ's Groove Mix) - 4:37

== Charts ==
=== Weekly charts ===
Chart (2009–2010)	Peak position
European Hot 100 Singles	40
Ireland (IRMA)	28
Scotland Singles (OCC)	17
UK Singles (OCC)	14
UK Hip Hop/R&B (OCC)	3

=== Year-end charts ===
Chart (2009)	Position
UK Singles (OCC)	195

Chart (2010)	Position
UK Singles (OCC)	104

== Certifications ==
Region	Certification	Certified units/sales
United Kingdom (BPI)	Platinum	600,000^{‡}
^{‡} Sales+streaming figures based on certification alone.
