= N-Dubz =

English Hip hop group

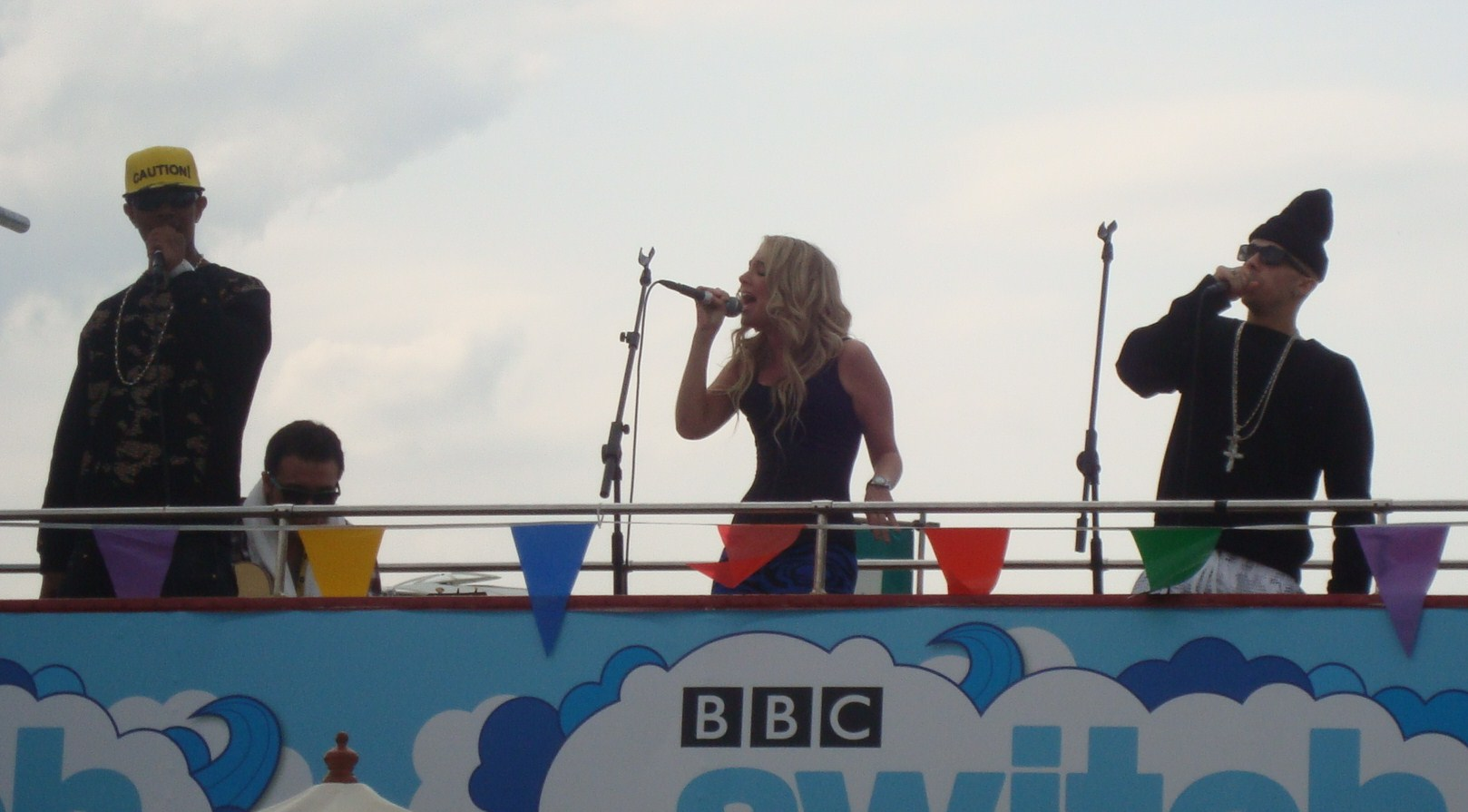
- N-Dubz performing in 2009

Background information
- Origin: Camden Town, London, England
- Genres: Hip-hop; R&B; grime
- Years active: 2000–2011 • 2022–present
- Labels: Polydor (2007–2008); All Around the World (2008–2011); Island (2009–2011); EMI (2023–present)
- Members: Dappy; Tulisa; Fazer
- Website: n-dubz.com

N-Dubz are an English hip-hop trio from Camden Town, London, England, consisting of cousins Dappy and Tulisa, and their friend Fazer. After winning a MOBO Award for Best Newcomer in 2007, N-Dubz briefly signed with Polydor Records before joining All Around the World. Released the following year, the trio's debut album, Uncle B, was certified double platinum and gave rise to four UK top-40 singles.

In 2009, N-Dubz won Best UK Act at the MOBO Awards and released their second album, Against All Odds. It charted at number six and was certified platinum, preceded by their first top-10 single "I Need You". The same year, N-Dubz achieved their first UK chart-topper, as a featured artist on Tinchy Stryder's song "Number 1". The trio's third album, Love.Live.Life (2010), charted at number seven and became their third successive platinum-selling album. It included the top-10 singles "We Dance On" and "Best Behaviour". The group then took an 11-year hiatus to pursue solo careers before they reformed in 2022, releasing the single "Charmer" and embarking on a sold-out UK arena tour.

== Career ==
=== 2000–2007: Group formation and Polydor Records ===
All three members of N-Dubz were born in Camden Town, north-west London; Fazer is of Afro-Caribbean heritage, while Dappy and Tulisa are of Irish and Greek-Cypriot heritage. They each attended several different schools, first meeting when they were about 13 at Haverstock School, and coming together as a group for the first time at about this age under the management of Dappy's father, Byron Contostavlos (formerly of Mungo Jerry), who died on 12 April 2007. They had a hard upbringing, living on tough estates and experienced a lot first-hand as teenagers, including violence, depression, drug abuse, extreme financial difficulty, bullying, and gang culture. Performing as the "Lickle Rinsers Crew", they released the singles "Bad Man Riddim" and "Life is Getting Sicker by the Day".

After "Lickle Rinsers Crew", they had planned to use the name "Hakuna Matata" ("there is no problem" in Swahili), but due to copyright conflict with Disney they chose "No Worries" instead. As there was already a group with this name, they changed briefly to "NW", which got the trio confused with Compton-based rap group N.W.A. They ultimately picked "NW1", their postcode district and a slight nod to The Lion King, and later changed it to "N-Dubz" (with "Dubz" slang for "W"). After making their first music video in 2005 for the track "Everyday of My Life", which was played on Channel U, recording more demos as NW1 such as "Don't Feel Like Moving", "Girl On Road" and "Livin Broke", their first single to be released was "You Better Not Waste My Time", which was available for download only until their 2006 self-released single, "I Swear", which gained them their first mainstream notice. It was not until 2007's "Feva Las Vegas", also self-released, that the group appeared on the UK charts, peaking at No. 57. Each member appeared on the second series of Channel 4's Dubplate Drama, after they began to get noticed as a group.

After winning a MOBO Award for Best Newcomer the group signed to Polydor Records and re-released their first single "You Better Not Waste My Time" on the label, which debuted at No. 26 on the UK singles chart. In mid-2007, Dappy released "Love for my Slum" with fellow UK artist Baker Trouble. This song was number one on Channel U for many weeks and was a big hit with the UK underground rap scene but was heavily criticised by the media for a scene in which Dappy is stood outside a block of expensive luxury flats with a "rich kid" who is trying to look like a gangster. The Independent wrote, "His lyrics combine jealousy with anger: 'You got too much to lose / You're in a great position... You wouldn't last a minute where I'm from / You'd go missing / So appreciate what you got / 'cos I'm still wishing.' And then he grabs the rich kid by his coat, pulls him toward him, and punches him in the face. The silent boy falls instantly to the pavement..."; they then went on to put "Do scenes like these suggest that music videos are encouraging their viewers to indulge in criminality?". Dappy appeared on the television show Never Mind the Buzzcocks on 29 November 2007, on Phill Jupitus's team, and wore a trademark "Dappy hat", also giving one to Simon Amstell to wear as part of the gag. Despite vowing he would not return to the show, he appeared for a second time on the guest team on 4 December 2008 and for a third time on Phill's team, broadcast on 18 November 2009.

=== 2008–2009: All Around the World records and Uncle B ===
In May 2008, a song entitled "Ouch" surfaced along with a music video. The video for "Ouch" attracted over 4 million viewers on networking site YouTube in just over a month after release. On 6 August 2008, it was announced that the group had left Polydor Records and had signed to All Around the World records. The label predominantly specialises in dance music; however, they have occasionally released hip hop records such as Ice Cube's "You Can Do It". The press release stated that the label would be releasing "Ouch" as the group's first single on the label in September 2008. The group's first album, Uncle B, was released on 17 November 2008. The album includes "You Better Not Waste My Time", "I Swear", "Feva Las Vegas", "Love for My Slums", "Ouch", "Defeat You" and "Papa Can You Hear Me?". "Strong Again" was touted as the third single to be released from the Uncle B album on 16 February 2009 and a music video was made, before the physical CD released of the song was cancelled for unknown reasons. The song charted for five weeks in the UK Singles Chart, peaking highest at number 24. Group member Dappy was featured in Tinchy Stryder's 2009 No. 1 single tentatively titled "Number 1", the video also featured cameo appearances from all N-Dubz's members. Due to the success of their debut album, the group embarked on their first headlining tour, Uncle B Tour. The tour was originally planned for 16 dates but due to high demand 5 extra dates were added. The tour was supported by Stevie Hoang and Tinchy Stryder with whom N-Dubz collaborated with on his No. 1 single "Number 1". The tour sold out within days. During one performance, Tulisa fainted on stage. Multiple news sources reported that it was due to suspected swine flu. Jonathan Shalit, the group's manager, stated that Tulisa "was taken ill on the flight out to Greece on Thursday" and that "her bandmates are all very worried about her." The group were due to perform at Radio 1's Big Weekend on 10 May 2009, but their participation was placed in doubt while Tulisa was hospitalised. It was later confirmed that Tulisa had tested negative for swine flu and the group did perform.

The song "Wouldn't You" was then announced to be the seventh, and last, single to be released from the Uncle B debut album. The song was released digitally on 25 May 2009 and peaked at No. 64 in the UK.

=== 2009–2010: Against All Odds ===
Tulisa and Dappy reprised their roles in the third and final series of the Channel 4 show Dubplate Drama. The story for the third series was mainly set around Laurissa's (Tulisa) relationship with her music manager and lead singer of an R&B group while tackling a drug addiction to cocaine. Dubplate Drama finished with Laurissa kicking her addictions and leaving in a taxi for a new life with her child.

N-Dubz appeared with other artists, including Tinchy Stryder and Pixie Lott, to record a charity song for War Child. The Noisettes, Chipmunk, MPHO, Ironik and Kid British also signed up for the project under the name The Young Soul Rebels. The music stars released "I Got Soul", a rewritten version of The Killers' "All These Things That I've Done", to raise money for marginalised children in war zones. Tulisa admitted she felt privileged to record the charity song. "It's an issue that hasn't been looked at enough. And you know, even until I found out about this event, I didn't really know that much about it, and that's saying something you know. And the fact that I'm only finding out now is not really good enough. So that was every reason for me to get involved." She told BBC Newsbeat. The group embarked on a Christmas Party Tour beginning on 17 November 2009. They visited 10 cities across the UK performing songs from both albums Uncle B and Against All Odds, as confirmed by their official MySpace page. The tour was originally to be a taster of their new album, but it was announced that the album Against All Odds would be released a day before the tour starts.

The lead single from the group's second album, I Need You, was released on 9 November 2009 and charted at No. 5 in the UK Singles Chart. The album Against All Odds, was released on 16 November 2009, and charted at No. 6 in the UK Album Chart. The album went platinum within approximately 2 months of release. The second single, "Playing with Fire" features R&B/pop musician, Mr Hudson. The song reached No. 15 in the UK Charts on album downloads alone; however, when the single was released, it fell to No. 16, reaching a new peak at No. 14 the week after.

The music video for the third single taken from the album, "Say It's Over", was released on 5 March 2010 on Channel AKA. It was announced that the single will be released on 25 April, it reached No. 27 on album downloads alone before the single was released. In late 2009, N-Dubz announced that they will tour their current album, Against All Odds in spring 2010, making it their third tour in two years, starting on 31 March and finishing on 20 April. It included 17 shows with supporting acts Skepta, Talay Riley and Ultra. On 1 April 2010, they released their first book, N-Dubz – Against All Odds: From Street Life to Chart Life, which they described as "the answer to the critics, there is a lot of bad press about N-Dubz at the moment and this is going to put the record straight about who we really are and what we're about!", saying they want to put "everything out there", and Fazer also adding "It's going to surprise you!". The book also gives access to a secret N-Dubz website.

=== 2010–2011: Love.Live.Life, Greatest Hits and disbandment ===
The group filmed a 6-part documentary, Being... N-Dubz, which premiered on 21 June 2010 on 4Music, and was later renewed for a second series in 2011. After much speculation, it was confirmed that Island Records had signed the group. The first release was the album Love.Live.Life, N-Dubz's third studio album. It was released in the UK on 29 November 2010.

Five singles were released from Love.Live.Life. The first, "We Dance On", had previously been released in May 2010 from the StreetDance soundtrack. On 1 September 2010, N-Dubz announced via Facebook that their first new single from the album would be "Best Behaviour", which was eventually released on 17 October. The music video premiered on Channel AKA and Clubland TV on 8 September and was uploaded on YouTube by AATW Records later that day.

The final three singles from Love. Life. Live were "Girls", "So Alive" and "Morning Star". Love. Life. Live became N-Dubz' third platinum selling album.

In August 2011, it emerged that N-Dubz had parted company with Island, stating that they were "Never going to co-operate with them when they decided to change what we are". With Tulisa taking up a role as a judge on series 8 of The X Factor and Dappy releasing his solo single "No Regrets", N-Dubz' gig on 18 September 2011 was described as "their final gig for the foreseeable future".

In November, Tulisa confirmed that N-Dubz were undergoing a two-year hiatus as Dappy and herself pursued solo careers. A Greatest Hits album was released on 28 November 2011. In an interview with This Morning on 24 September 2012, Tulisa said a reunion was in the works for 2013, after hers and Dappy's solo albums had been released. On 6 October 2012, during an edition of The X Factor, Tulisa once again confirmed that N-Dubz would be reforming. On 13 April 2017, when asked on the prospect of a reunion, Fazer replied, saying "100 per cent, that’s definitely going to come really soonish. Not right now, we’ve all got individual things we’re focusing on at the minute, but obviously it’s all about timing."

=== 2022-Present: Re-formation, Timeless and The Legacy Tour ===
On 16 May 2022, following an 11-year hiatus, N-Dubz announced their re-formation with new single "Charmer" and their Back to the Future Tour, a UK arena tour scheduled for November 2022. The tour sold out within minutes of release. The i further reported the same month that the band had spent six months working on a new album with Chip, Wiley and Gary Barlow.

In April 2023, the group released "February", which will be the first single off the new album. The group also announced a summer tour at open air arenas and parks across the UK and Ireland.

On 8 June 2023, N-Dubz announced the title of their fourth studio album called Timeless and released the second single "Habibti". The album was released on 4 August 2023.

On 2 October 2026 the group announced their arena tour, “The Legacy Tour” for 2027.

== Controversies ==
On 31 January 2009 Dappy and Fazer were escorted from a BA flight from Edinburgh to London by police after it touched down, after allegedly threatening other passengers. A source told The Sun "They were swearing at kids on the plane, being foul and threatening passengers. Cabin crew called ahead to the police, who were waiting when the plane landed. They were taken away by armed officers."

In late 2009, a feud started between Tulisa and Elly Jackson of La Roux who stated that all the females that do hip-hop music dress up like prostitutes. Tulisa took offence saying "she shouldn't talk about people's jobs that way... it's just wrong, where was she brought up – in a barn?", calling Jackson a "twat".

Later that month it surfaced that N-Dubz's DJ Maze had allegedly raped a young fan after a show N-Dubz had done at Butlins holiday camp in Skegness. They instead had BBC Radio 1Xtra's Twin B as their Christmas Party Tour DJ.

On 12 January 2010, N-Dubz appeared on The Chris Moyles Show on BBC Radio 1. The show received a text message from a Chloe Moody in Boston, Lincolnshire complaining that Dappy was "vile" and "a little boy with a silly hat" and that N-Dubz were "losers". Dappy secretly copied Moody's phone number from the studio console and, the following day, tried calling her and sent threatening messages including: "Your [sic] gonna die. U sent a very bad msg towards Ndubz on The Chris Moyels [sic] show yesterday Morning and for that reason u will never be left alone!!! u say sorry I will leave u alone u ****." Moody claimed that she continued to receive messages after declining to apologise but N-Dubz management later apologised on his behalf and offered free tickets to one of his concerts, although Dappy has not apologised to Moody personally. The rapper had appeared with the then-Schools Secretary Ed Balls to launch pop single "RU Cyber Safe" in November 2009, but was dropped from the campaign with Mr Balls saying: "This text message was completely unacceptable and it is right that he has not only apologised, but accepted there was no excuse for his behaviour."

In March 2010, a dispute then started between N-Dubz and Lethal Bizzle, who claimed he had written and produced N-Dubz's hit "I Need You" for them and so should be acknowledged in the credits for it, with Tulisa hitting back on Twitter that "he's jus triena boost his status, ...wat an unbelievable loser!" and N-Dubz later posted a video on their official YouTube channel through Twitter with the caption: "THE PROOF WE DIDNT STEAL S**T, WE MAKE OUR OWN HITS!" of when he had sent them the finished song and when they had actually finished the song, implying that their version was over 2 months older than his.

== Discography ==
- Uncle B (2008)
- Against All Odds (2009)
- Love.Live.Life (2010)
- Timeless (2023)

== Tours ==
=== Headlining ===
- Uncle B Tour (2009)
- N-Dubz Christmas Party (2009)
- The Against All Odds Tour (2010)
- Love.Live.Life Tour (2011)
- Reformation (2022)
- Summer UK Tour (2023)
- The Legacy Tour (2027)

=== Supporting act ===
- Clubland Live (2009)

== Bibliography ==
- 2010: Against All Odds – From Street Life to Chart Life

== Awards ==
Year	Award	Category	Result
2007	MOBO Awards	Best UK Newcomer	Won
2008	Urban Music Awards	Best Group	Nominated
2008	Urban Music Awards	Best Music Video ("Ouch")	Nominated
2009	O2 Silver Clef Awards	The Digital Award	Won
2009	MOBO Awards	Best UK Act	Won
2009	MOBO Awards	Best Album (Uncle B)	Won
2010	BRIT Awards	British Single ("Number 1")	Nominated
2010	MOBO Awards	Best Song ("Playing with Fire")	Won
2023	O2 Silver Clef Awards	Best Group	Won
