= Wouldn't You =

Single by N-Dubz

from the album Uncle B
- Released: 25 May 2009
- Recorded: 2008
- Genre: British hip hop; R&B
- Length: 3:54
- Label: All Around the World
- Songwriter(s): Dino Contostavlos; Tula Contostavlos; Richard Rawson
- Producer(s): Richard Rawson; Dino Contostavlos

N-Dubz singles chronology
"Number 1" (2009)	"Wouldn't You" (2009)	"I Got Soul" (2009)

"Wouldn't You" is a single by English hip hop trio, N-Dubz. The song was released as the seventh and final single from their double-platinum debut album Uncle B.

== Track listing ==
- Digital Download
1. "Wouldn't You" (Radio Edit)
2. "Wouldn't You" (Dom Navarra Remix)
3. "Wouldn't You" (Milk n Honey Remix)
4. "Wouldn't You" (Jorg Schmid Remix)

== Music video ==
The video for the song emerged onto YouTube on 7 April 2009 on the All Around the World official page. The video for Wouldn't You which was produced by Luti Fagbenle and Directed by Ben Peters. The video starts with a car driving up to the house, then a man gets out and Tulisa gets out as well after images off Dappy and Fazer outside and Tulisa on the bed. You then see Tulisa get out of the car and walk through the front doors whilst the man gets her bags. Throughout Tulisa's verses you see clips of her in a bedroom. You then see her and her boyfriend hold hands then notice someone. Next you see Dappy and Fazer outside as he raps his verse's. Dappy starts to flirt with a girl whilst her boyfriend fixes a car. Fazer sees two girls sitting down whilst doing work in the garden, he then goes over to one of the girls when her friend goes away. You then see Dappy and the girl kiss until the boyfriend sees them and makes him leave. When the girls friends come back Fazer retreats away from the girl. Tulisa's real boyfriend arrives and they hug as her other boyfriend leaves. You then see all three off them performing in an empty hall. Tulisa then waits at an empty bed until her boyfriend comes up, then you see Dappy enter a room which has the girl he likes in and the same with Fazer. Throughout the video the same house is used in all three situations.

== Charts ==
The song debuted at 111 on the UK Singles Chart, entering the top 100 in the following week's chart. The song has reached a peak of #64.

Chart (2009)	Peak position
UK Singles (OCC)	64
