= Uncle B =

Studio album by N-Dubz
- Released: 17 November 2008
- Recorded: 2004–2008
- Genres: Hip-hop; grime; R&B
- Length: 58:10
- Label: All Around the World
- Producers: Fazer; Dappy; Kane Robinson; Fraser T. Smith; Jack Freegard; Junior Edwards; Navid Nourizadeh; Beat Freaks

N-Dubz chronology
Uncle B (2008)	Against All Odds (2009)

Singles from Uncle B
- 1. "You Better Not Waste My Time" Released: 19 August 2006; 2. "I Swear" Released: 12 September 2006; 3. "Feva Las Vegas" Released: 14 May 2007; 4. "Ouch" Released: 29 September 2008; 5. "Papa Can You Hear Me?" Released: 24 November 2008; 6. "Strong Again" Released: 9 February 2009; 7. "Wouldn't You" Released: 20 April 2009

Uncle B is the debut studio album released by the British hip-hop group N-Dubz. The album is dedicated to former N-Dubz manager and father of Dappy, Byron Contostavlos, who died shortly before the band were signed to their second record label All Around the World. It entered the official UK Albums Chart at number 11. On 6 January 2009 it was announced on the official All Around the World website that the album had gone platinum. Seven singles have been released from the album, with the first three being released by LRC, and the last four being released by All Around the World. The album was not released until in 2008, despite recording starting in 2006. This was due to the group changing record label from LRC to All Around the World.

== Singles ==
"You Better Not Waste My Time" was released as the album's debut single, on LRC Records. The song was released as a digital download, peaking at #141 on the UK Singles Chart. The single was released physically by Polydor, in a joint deal with All Around The World, in September 2007, peaking at #26.

"I Swear" was released as the album's second single, on LRC Records. The song was released both physically and digitally, peaking at #91 on the UK Singles Chart. The single was also released in the United States, becoming their only single ever to do so.

"Feva Las Vegas" was released as the album's third single, on LRC Records. The song was released both physically and digitally, peaking at #57 on the UK Singles Chart.

"Ouch" was released as the album's fourth single, on All Around The World Records. The song peaked at #22 on the UK Singles Chart, despite being widely available for over two months before its official release.

"Papa Can You Hear Me?" was released as the album's fifth single, on All Around The World Records. The song peaked at #19 on the UK Singles Chart, becoming the group's first top 20 hit.

"Strong Again" was released as the album's sixth single, on All Around The World Records. The song peaked at #24 on the UK Singles Chart, despite being one of their highest played hits, and their first to reach the A-List Radio 1 Playlist.

"Wouldn't You" was released as the album's seventh and final single, on All Around The World Records. The song peaked at #64 on the UK Singles Chart, despite being a fan-favourite and reaching the B-List Radio 1 Playlist.

=== Promotional music videos ===
Music videos were made for four non-singles from the album - "N-Dubz vs. NAA", "Defeat You", "Sex" and "Love for My Slum". "N-Dubz vs. NAA" appeared as the b-side to "Feva Las Vegas", and there was no music video was subsequently recorded in promotion for the single. "Defeat You" was originally intended to be released a single, however, the release was cancelled in favour of "Papa (Can You Hear Me)", however, a music video was subsequently recorded before the release was cancelled. Chipmunk is featured in the video. A music video for "Sex" was recorded in promotion of a new version of the track being used in an episode of Channel 4's Shameless. The new version features an extended intro, verses by Tulisa and Fazer, and an extended outro. A music video for "Love for My Slum" was recorded to the song's popularity amongst fans.

== Critical reception ==
Professional ratings
Review scores
Source	Rating
The Guardian	3/5 stars
In the News	(9/10)
Orange	(positive)
The Observer	3/5 stars
RapReviews	(7.5/10)

Uncle B has received mixed reviews from critics. Orange gave the album a mixed review: "Slickly produced hip-hop, grime and r'n'b form the backdrop to Tulisa's better-than-most vocals and the whimsical rhymeplay of Fazer and Dappy, who touch on everything from cheating ('Ouch'), "fake" MCs ('Defeat You') to fornication. "I don't mean to be pushy, pushy/I'm just in it for the pussy, pussy," snarls Dappy on the shameless 'Sex', which deserves a government warning in its own right. Still, they're not as mean as the So Solid Crew of yesteryear, nor as good, and their faux bravado is just what you'd expect from these poster kids for urban Britannia. Parents won't be too impressed, mind you, but Uncle B will likely be lauded for its furious party jams made with the Skins generation of reckless teens in mind. All that, and it's actually quite a good listen". The Guardian also gave the album a mixed review.

== Track listing ==
Uncle B
No.	Title	Writer(s)	Producer(s)	Length
1.	"Intro"	N-Dubz	Fazer; Dappy	0:41
2.	"Wouldn't You"	N-Dubz	Fazer; Dappy	3:54
3.	"Strong Again"	N-Dubz; Fraser T. Smith; Kane Robinson	Fazer; Smith; Robinson	3:14
4.	"Don't Get Nine"	N-Dubz; Jack Freegard	Fazer; Dappy; Freegard	3:00
5.	"I Swear"	N-Dubz; Junior Edwards	Fazer; Dappy; Edwards	4:04
6.	"Ouch"	N-Dubz	Fazer; Dappy	3:57
7.	"N-Dubz Vs NAA"	N-Dubz; Solomon Wilson; Tyrone Lindo	Fazer; Dappy	2:50
8.	"Public Transport (Skit)"	N-Dubz; Harri Davies	Fazer; Dappy	0:18
9.	"Love for My Slum" (featuring Baker Trouble)	N-Dubz; Leon Baker	Fazer; Dappy	3:35
10.	"Better Not Waste My Time"	N-Dubz; Freegard	Fazer; Dappy; Freegard	3:25
11.	"Work Work"	N-Dubz	Fazer; Dappy	3:57
12.	"Feva Las Vegas"	N-Dubz	Fazer; Dappy	4:18
13.	"Defeat You" (featuring Chipmunk)	N-Dubz; Jahmaal Fyffe	Fazer; Dappy; Edwards	2:56
14.	"Sex"	N-Dubz; Navid Nourizadeh	Dappy; Nourizadeh	2:16
15.	"Secrets"	N-Dubz; Beat Freaks	Fazer; Dappy; Beat Freaks	3:48
16.	"Papa Can You Hear Me?"	N-Dubz	Fazer; Dappy	4:03
17.	"Outro"	N-Dubz	Fazer; Dappy	1:01

== Charts ==
Chart	Peak position	Certification(s)
Irish Albums Chart	36	
UK Albums Chart	11	2× Platinum
