= Number 1 (Tinchy Stryder song) =

2009 single by Tinchy Stryder

Single by Tinchy Stryder featuring N-Dubz

from the album Catch 22 and Against All Odds
- B-side: "Stuck on My Mind"
- Released: 20 April 2009
- Recorded: 2009
- Genre: Electronic; hip hop; Eurodance
- Length: 3:35
- Label: Takeover Entertainment Limited; Universal Island Records
- Songwriters: Kwasi Danquah III (composer); Dino Contostavlos (co-lyricist); James Lavelle (co-lyricist); Fraser T. Smith (co-lyricist)
- Producer: Fraser T. Smith

Tinchy Stryder singles chronology
"Take Me Back" (2009)	"Number 1" (2009)	"Never Leave You" (2009)

N-Dubz singles chronology
"Strong Again" (2009)	"Number 1" (2009)	"Wouldn't You" (2009)

Music video
- "Number 1" on YouTube

"Number 1" is a song by British rapper Tinchy Stryder featuring vocals from Dappy of N-Dubz and co-written by Dappy, James Lavelle and Fraser T. Smith, who produced the track, for Stryder's second studio album, Catch 22. The song was released as a single on 20 April 2009 from Stryder's studio album Catch 22 and a remix was later included on N-Dubz's second studio album, Against All Odds.

The version released as a single and included on Catch 22 features verses by Dappy and Stryder only; however, the version that appears on Against All Odds features new verses by Tulisa and Fazer. "Number 1" topped the UK Singles Chart, a position it maintained for three weeks. Outside the United Kingdom, "Number 1" topped the charts in Ireland and peaked within the top 40 of the charts in Denmark and Slovakia. When "Number 1" topped the UK Singles Chart, it became the first single entitled "Number 1" to peak at number one on any national singles chart in the world.

== Background ==
According to producers James Lavelle and Fraser T. Smith in an interview with HitQuarters, although Dappy was involved in the writing of the song, he had worked with an up-and-coming artist J-Rhymz and whilst in the studio with the young singer/songwriter, his appearance on the final version happened by accident.

"We’d worked with him on a track called "Strong Again" ... and we wanted to work with him more because he’s an amazing talent. So 'Number 1' came about from a co-writing session. Dappy put the hook down and it sounded so good we thought it had to stay."

== Critical reception ==
"Number 1" has received positive reviews from Digital Spy and the BBC. David Balls of Digital Spy gave the song a positive review: "A savvy collaboration with urban pop trio N-Dubz, this offering places Tinchy's distinctively gritty vocals over shimmering disco beats and even throws in a few strings for good measure. The result, while catchy enough, falls a little short of its predecessor and will no doubt leave some grime enthusiasts claiming: "I don't understand how you're number one". BBC chart blog also gave the song a positive review: "N-Dubz. Everything they do raises a grin to my chops. Dappy's insistence on throwing in a "nah-nah-naiii-hee" as soon as his microphone is switched on is a brilliant pop thing. Tinchy's singy-raps, contrasting nicely with Dappy's rappy-singing. And I use the word 'contrasting' quite wrongly there". The song was awarded a four star rating.

== Chart performance ==
"Number 1" entered at the top of the UK Singles Chart on 26 April 2009 – for the week ending dated 2 May 2009 – selling 87,000 copies in its first week and beating competition from La Roux's "In for the Kill" with over 20,000 copies, according to the All Around the World website. The song spent three weeks at number one before dropping to number two in its fourth week, replaced at number one by "Boom Boom Pow" by the Black Eyed Peas. "Number 1" spent 18 consecutive weeks in the top 40 and 38 weeks in the top 100. On BBC Radio 1's Chart Show, it was revealed that the track was the first song with the words "number one" in its title ever to reach number one on both the British and Irish charts – and, in turn, anywhere in the world. In Ireland, the song entered at number eight before rising to the top the following week. The song spent five weeks at the top.

== Promotion ==
N-Dubz and Tinchy Stryder performed the single version of the song on GMTV and on the Uncle B Tour, N-Dubz performed the version later included on Against All Odds. The artists performed the song at Radio 1's Big Weekend in the United Kingdom. They also performed the song together on BBC "Sound" in May 2009, BBC Switch Live in November 2009 and the MOBOs in Glasgow in September 2009.

== Music video ==
The music video was directed by Emil Nava and produced by Ben Pugh. The video features both Stryder and Dappy but also has cameo appearances from Tulisa and Fazer. It begins with Stryder holding a Star in the Hood necklace and then begins singing the opening credits, introducing himself and N-Dubz, with all members of N-Dubz beside him. The video continues with Stryder and Dappy dancing in front of various backgrounds while they both have various outfit changes, including Dappy in a red Adidas tracksuit. The video frequently cuts between scenes with both N-Dubz and Stryder, two provocative female dancers and a string quartet. At one point in the video it features Stryder standing in front of a giant "Number 1". Towards the end it shows both Stryder and Dappy with a background of stars.

== Track listings and formats ==
CD single (2701362)
No.	Title	Length
1.	"Number 1" (radio edit)	3:35
2.	"Number 1" (Bimbo Jones remix)	3:15
3.	"Number 1" (remix featuring Kano)	3:34
4.	"Stuck on My Mind"	3:46
Total length:		14:10

Digital download
No.	Title	Length
1.	"Number 1"	3:35
2.	"Number 1" (remix featuring Kano)	3:34
3.	"Number 1" (Bimbo Jones remix)	3:15
4.	"Number 1" (Hypasonic remix)	5:41
Total length:		16:05

== Charts ==
=== Weekly charts ===
Chart (2009)	Peak position
CIS Airplay (TopHit)	3
Denmark (Tracklisten)	37
Europe (European Hot 100 Singles)	6
Ireland (IRMA)	1
Russia Airplay (TopHit)	2
Slovakia (Rádio Top 100)	25
UK Singles (OCC)	1
UK Airplay (Music Week)	8

=== Year-end charts ===
Chart (2009)	Position
CIS (TopHit)	34
Russia Airplay (TopHit)	31
UK Singles (OCC)	11

=== Decade-end charts ===
Chart (2000–2009)	Position
UK Singles (OCC)	70

== Certifications ==
Region	Certification	Certified units/sales
United Kingdom (BPI)	2× Platinum	1,200,000^{‡}
^{‡} Sales+streaming figures based on certification alone.

== See also ==
- List of number-one singles of 2009 (Ireland)
- List of number-one singles from the 2000s (UK)
- List of UK R&B Singles Chart number ones of 2009
