= Fazer (rapper) =

British musician (born 1987)

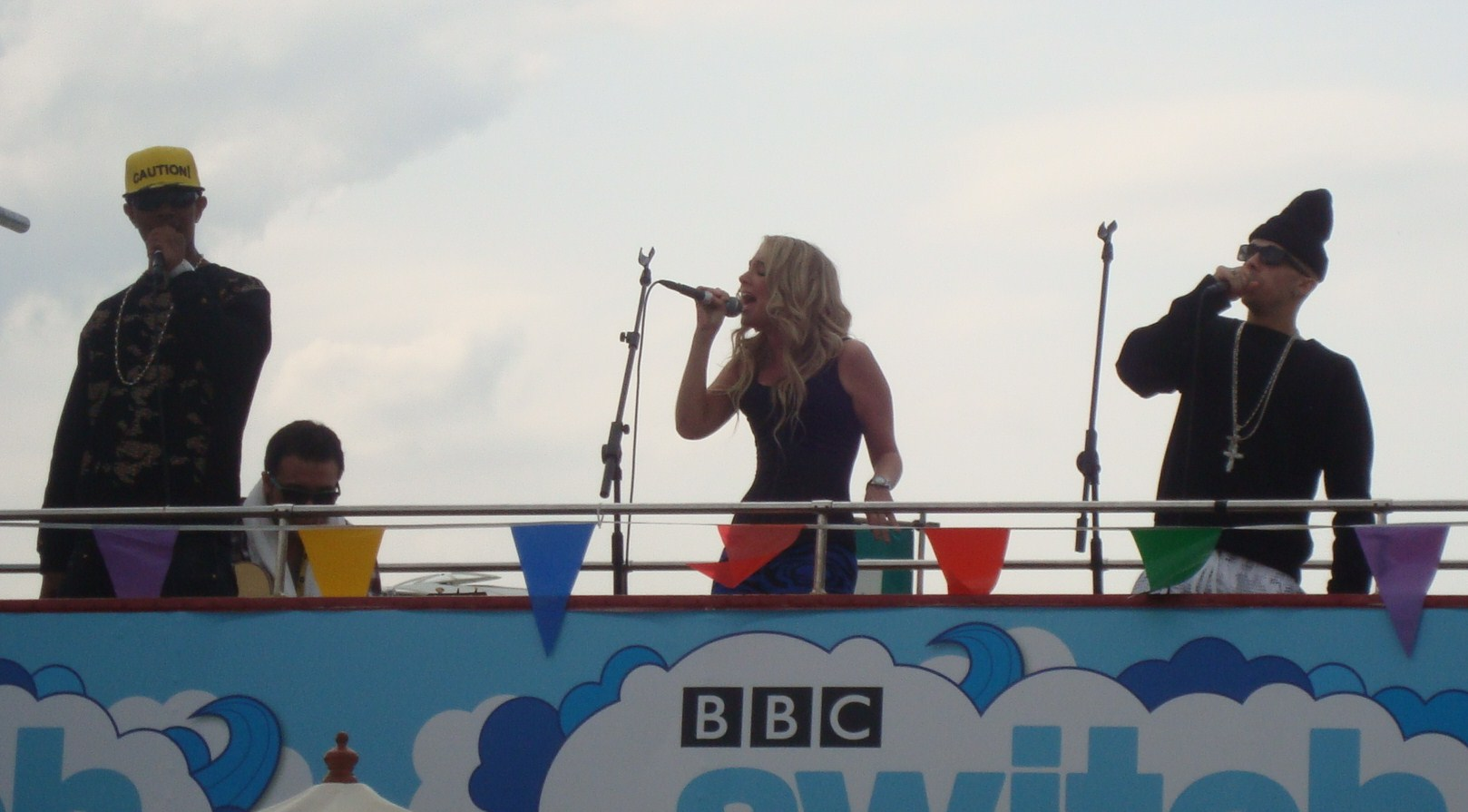
- Fazer (left) performing as part of N-Dubz in 2009

Background information
- Born: Richard Rawson; 5 February 1987 (age 39); London, England
- Genres: Hip hop; grime; dance
- Occupations: Rapper; singer; songwriter; record producer; disc jockey; actor
- Instruments: Vocals; keyboard; drums; piano; personal computer; sampler; synthesiser; music sequencer; drum machine; turntables
- Years active: 2000—present
- Labels: Polydor (2006–2008); All Around the World (2008–2014); Island (2009-2012); Sky's the Limit (2013–present); Xploded (2022–present)
- Website: iamfazer.com

Richard Rawson (born 5 February 1987), better known by his stage name Fazer, is a British rapper, singer, songwriter, record producer and DJ. He is popularly known as a member of hip hop trio N-Dubz, with whom he released four studio albums and won four MOBO Awards.

== Early life ==
Fazer is the son of an English father and Jamaican mother, and was brought up in Camden Town, London. Fazer first met Dappy when they started attending the same karate class, becoming best friends at school. They attended Haverstock School, with third member Tulisa Contostavlos (Dappy's cousin) attending the school for a while as well. It was at school that the trio became close friends and formed N-Dubz.

== Career ==
Fazer is a member of hip hop trio N-Dubz, from the age of 11. N-Dubz is known as one of the first breakthrough acts for UK Urban Music. They released three platinum-selling studio albums and won five MOBO awards. N-Dubz released their first album, Uncle B, in 2008, followed by Against All Odds in 2009, and Love.Live.Life in 2010. In 2011 the band announced a hiatus to focus on solo projects, after a hugely successful UK Arena Tour and a compilation album Greatest Hits. The group have said on many occasions that they will reunite. In May 2022 the group officially reformed announcing a UK arena tour.

On 3 March 2012, Fazer was featured on BBC One where he performed his version of Englishman in New York originally by Sting and he also performed a tribute to Whitney Houston with Skepta. About two weeks later, Fazer remixed "Somebody That I Used to Know" by Gotye. Fazer shot a video for his debut single "Killer" on 29 May 2012, released on 26 August 2012.

In 2013, Fazer and his production partner, Peter Ibsen, both announced the opening of their production company, Sky's the Limit Entertainment. Fazer released a track "6-Foot 8 (Freestyle)" under the new company's name. The pair produced songs for Fazer himself and other artists such as Tulisa, Rihanna, Rita Ora and Jessie J.

On 12 July 2013, Fazer headlined the Yahoo! stage at the Yahoo! Wireless Festival, and performed songs such as "Killer", "Fireflies", "Planetary", and an N-Dubz medley. On 10 August 2013, Fazer performed at the BBC Urban Classics Prom alongside Wretch 32. He performed "Fireflies" and "Movie". On 5 February 2014, he announced that he would now be releasing music under his real name Richard Rawson. In July 2014, Rawson released his single "Fireflies" which features vocals by Tom Parker of The Wanted. On the track, Fazer raps about his journey so far in music. The song is about hope and achieving dreams. On 24 March 2017, Fazer released a song "I Woke Up".

== Personal life ==
Rawson had a crush on Tulisa in school, until he realised that she was Dappy's cousin. The pair were in a relationship from mid-2010 until February 2012, when they broke up during a holiday together.

In January 2013, it was announced he was dating model Ashley Emma, and that she was six months pregnant. On 20 February 2013 their daughter Ava Rose Rawson was born.

On 19 February 2023, Rawson revealed on his Instagram, that his partner had given birth to twins.

== Discography ==
=== Singles ===
Single	Year	Peak chart positions	Album
Single	Year	UK	Album
"Killer"	2012	17	Non-album singles
"6foot8 freestyle"	2013	—	Non-album singles
"Fireflies" (featuring Tom Parker)	2014	—	Non-album singles
"I Woke Up"	2017	—	Non-album singles
"Bad in Real Life"	2018	—	Non-album singles
"UFO"	2019	—	Non-album singles
"Give It Away"	2019	—	Non-album singles
"You Wanna Ride"	2020	—	Non-album singles
"Money Right"	2020	—	Non-album singles
"Tears"	2022	—	Non-album singles
"—" denotes single that did not chart or was not released

=== Production and writing credits ===
==== Tulisa - The Female Boss ====
- 02. "Young"
- 04. "Damn"
- 06. "Live Your Life"
- 07. "Visa"

==== Jessie J - Alive ====
- 16. "Magnetic"

==== Tulisa - Non-album Single ====
- 01. "Living Without You"

==== BTS - Wings ====
- 10. "Lost"

=== Music videos ===
List of music in which Fazer appears in (not including N-Dubz videos)
Title	Year	Director(s)	Artist	Ref.
"No Regrets"	2011	Benny Boom	Dappy	
"Killer"	2012	Jack Fresh	Fazer	
"I'm Coming (Tarzan 2)"	2012	Morgan Keyz	Dappy	
"6foot8 (Freestyle)"	2013	Richard Rawson	Fazer	
"Tarzan 2.5"	2013	Morgan Keyz	Dappy	
"Pound Cake Freestyle"	2013	Morgan Keyz	Fazer	
"Fireflies (ft. Tom Parker)"	2014	Richard Rawson	Richard Rawson	
"Proud"	2015	Pierre Jermaine	Young Spray ft. Wretch 32 and Chip	
"At It Again (Tarzan 2.75)"	2015	Vertex	Dappy ft. Tulisa	
"I Woke Up"	2017	Aaron Smalls (360 Capture House)	Fazer	
