= List of UK top-ten singles in 2010 =

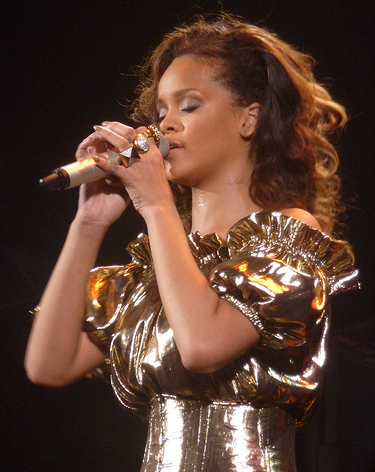
Rihanna had the biggest selling single of 2010, "Love the Way You Lie" with Eminem, which peaked at number two. It was one of six top 10 hits for Rihanna during the year, including number-ones "Only Girl (In the World)" and "What's My Name?" (which topped the chart in January 2011).

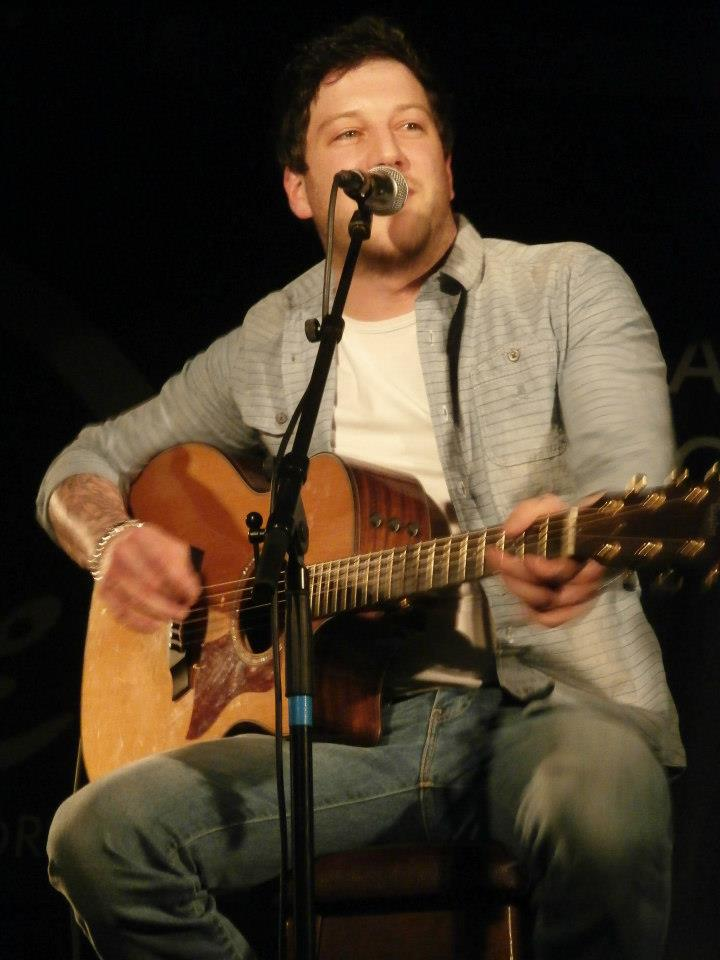
Matt Cardle, the winner of the seventh series of The X Factor, covered Biffy Clyro's "Many of Horror" under the new title "When We Collide" and it became both the second best-selling song of the year and the Christmas number-one.

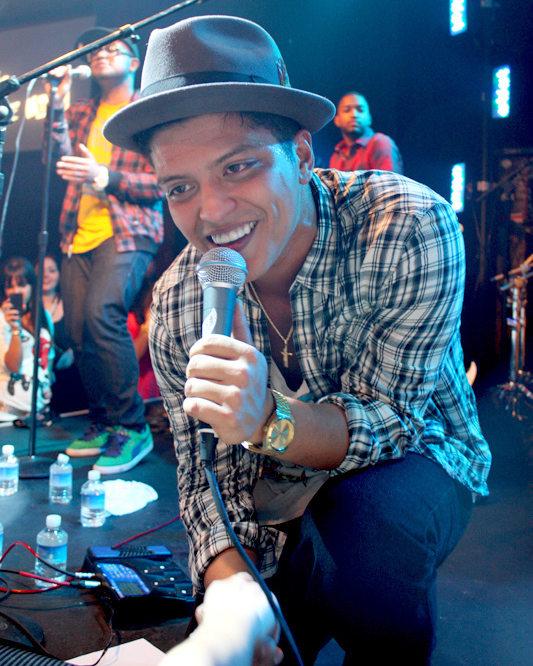
Bruno Mars made the UK top 10 for the first time in 2010 with three singles making the countdown, including the number-one hits "Nothin' on You" (with B.o.B) and "Just the Way You Are" (the third best seller of the year).

The UK Singles Chart is one of many music charts compiled by the Official Charts Company that calculates the best-selling singles of the week in the United Kingdom. Since 2004 the chart has been based on the sales of both physical singles and digital downloads, with airplay figures excluded from the official chart. This list shows singles that peaked in the Top 10 of the UK Singles Chart during 2010, as well as singles which peaked in 2009 and 2011 but were in the top 10 in 2010. The entry date is when the song appeared in the top 10 for the first time (week ending, as published by the Official Charts Company, which is six days after the chart is announced).

One-hundred and fifty-two singles were in the top ten in 2010. Nine singles from 2009 remained in the top 10 for several weeks at the beginning of the year, while "What's My Name?" by Rihanna featuring Drake" and "Who's That Chick?" by David Guetta featuring Rihanna were both released in 2010 but did not reach their peak until 2011.. "TiK ToK" by Kesha, "Starstrukk" by 3OH!3 featuring Katy Perry, "Don't Stop Believing" by Journey, "Look for Me" by Chipmunk featuring Talay Riley, "The Climb" by Joe McElderry and "3 Words" by Cheryl Cole featuring will.i.am were the singles from 2009 to reach their peak in 2010. Forty-six artists scored multiple entries in the top 10 in 2010. Ellie Goulding, Justin Bieber, Nicki Minaj, Tinie Tempah and The Wanted were among the many artists who achieved their first UK charting top 10 single in 2010.

The first number-one single of the year was "The Climb" by X Factor series 6 winner Joe McElderry. Overall, thirty-five different singles peaked at number-one in 2010, with JLS (3, including the charity single "Everybody Hurts" with Helping Haiti) having the most singles hit that position.

== Background ==
=== Multiple entries ===
One-hundred and fifty-two singles charted in the top 10 in 2010, with one-hundred and forty-five singles reaching their peak this year.

Forty-six artists scored multiple entries in the top 10 in 2010. Rihanna secured the record for most top 10 hits in 2010 with six hit singles.

=== Chart debuts ===
Seventy-one artists achieved their first top 10 single in 2010, either as a lead or featured artist. Of these, fifteen went on to record another hit single that year: B.o.B, Drake, Ellie Goulding, Emma's Imagination, Example, Florence and the Machine, Iyaz, Justin Bieber, Labrinth, Matt Cardle, Nicki Minaj, Professor Green, Roll Deep, Swedish House Mafia and The Wanted. Bruno Mars and Glee Cast scored two more top 10 singles in 2010. Tinie Tempah had three other entries in his breakthrough year.

The following table (collapsed on desktop site) does not include acts who had previously charted as part of a group and secured their first top 10 solo single.

Artist	Number of top 10s	First entry	Chart position	Other entries					
Iyaz	2	"Replay"	1	"Solo" (3)					
Sidney Samson	1	"Riverside (Let's Go!)"	2	—					
Wizard Sleeve	1	"Riverside (Let's Go!)"	2	—					
Florence and the Machine	2	"You've Got the Love"	5	"You Got the Dirtee Love" (2)					
Owl City	1	"Fireflies"	1	—					
Glee cast	3	"Don't Stop Believin'"	2	"Halo"/"Walking on Sunshine" (9), "Total Eclipse of the Heart" (9)					
Example	2	"Won't Go Quietly"	6	"Kickstarts" (3)					
Helping Haiti	1	"Everybody Hurts"	1	—					
Miley Cyrus	1	"Everybody Hurts"	1	—					
Ellie Goulding	2	"Starry Eyed"	4	"Your Song" (2)					
Tinie Tempah	4	"Pass Out"	1	"Frisky" (2), "Written in the Stars" (1), "Miami 2 Ibiza" (4)					
Naughty Boy	1	"Never Be Your Woman"	8	—	Justin Bieber	2	"Baby"	3	"Eenie Meenie" (9)
Inna	1	"Hot"	6	—					
Young Money	1	"BedRock"	9	—					
Drake	2	"BedRock"	9	"What's My Name?" (9) ^{[MM]}					
Nicki Minaj	2	"BedRock"	9	"2012 (It Ain't the End)" (9)					
Lloyd	1	"BedRock"	9	—					
Delirious?	1	"History Makers"	4	—					
Professor Green	2	"I Need You Tonight"	3	"Just Be Good to Green" (5)					
Ed Drewett	1	"I Need You Tonight"	3	—					
Selena Gomez & the Scene	1	"Naturally"	7	—					
Roll Deep	2	"Good Times"	1	"Green Light" (1)					
Aggro Santos	1	"Candy"	5	—					
Edward Maya	1	"Stereo Love"	4	—					
Vika Jigulina	1	"Stereo Love"	4	—					
Fyfe Dangerfield	1	"She's Always a Woman"	7	—					
B.o.B	2	"Nothin' on You"	1	"Airplanes" (1)					
Bruno Mars	3	"Nothin' on You"	1	"Billionaire" (3), "Just the Way You Are" (1)					
Shout for England	1	"Shout"	1	—					
James Corden	1	"Shout"	1	—					
Labrinth	2	"Frisky"	2	"Let the Sun Shine" (3)					
K'naan	1	"Wavin' Flag"	2	—					
Hayley Williams	1	"Airplanes"	1	—					
Yolanda Be Cool	1	"We No Speak Americano"	1	—					
DCUP	1	"We No Speak Americano"	1	—					
MNDR	1	"Bang Bang Bang"	6	—					
Eliza Doolittle	1	"Pack Up"	5	—					
The Wanted	2	"All Time Low"	1	"Heart Vacancy" (2)					
Swedish House Mafia	2	"One (Your Name)"	7	"Miami 2 Ibiza" (4)					
Magnetic Man	1	"I Need Air"	10	—					
Katy B	1	"Katy on a Mission"	5	—					
Pepper & Piano	1	"You Took My Heart"	7	—					
Laza Morgan	1	"Start Without You"	1	—					
Emma's Imagination	2	"This Day"	10	"Focus" (7)					
Eric Turner	1	"Written in the Stars"	1	—					
Duck Sauce	1	"Barbra Streisand"	3	—					
Mike Posner	1	"Cooler than Me"	5	—					
Alexis Jordan	1	"Happiness"	3	—					
Far East Movement	1	"Like a G6"	5	—					
The Cataracs	1	"Like a G6"	5	—					
Dev	1	"Like a G6"	5	—					
The X Factor Finalists 2010	1	"Heroes"	1	—					
Aiden Grimshaw	1	"Heroes"	1	—					
Belle Amie	1	"Heroes"	1	—					
Cher Lloyd	1	"Heroes"	1	—					
Diva Fever	1	"Heroes"	1	—					
F.Y.D.	1	"Heroes"	1	—					
John Adeleye	1	"Heroes"	1	—					
Katie Waissel	1	"Heroes"	1	—					
Mary Byrne	1	"Heroes"	1	—					
Matt Cardle	2	"Heroes"	1	"When We Collide" (1)					
Nicolo Festa	1	"Heroes"	1	—					
One Direction	1	"Heroes"	1	—					
Paije Richardson	1	"Heroes"	1	—					
Rebecca Ferguson	1	"Heroes"	1	—					
Storm Lee	1	"Heroes"	1	—					
Treyc Cohen	1	"Heroes"	1	—					
Wagner	1	"Heroes"	1	—					
Willow	1	"Whip My Hair"	2	—					
The Trashmen	1	"Surfin' Bird"	3	—					

Notes

Although Jedward scored their first top 10 hit in 2010 with "Under Pressure (Ice Ice Baby)" they were part of The X Factor series 6 finalists, who reached number-one with "You Are Not Alone". Olly Murs, who also featured on this single, had his first two top 10 entries in his own right, namely debut "Please Don't Let Me Go" and "Thinking of Me". Diana Vickers peaked at number one with "Once" in 2010 but had appeared on The X Factor in 2008 and, along with her fellow contestants, landed the top spot that same year with their cover of Mariah Carey's "Hero".

McLean had his first solo hit single, "Your Name", this year but he had a previous chart credit on "I Got Soul" with Young Soul Rebels. Matt Cardle sang on "Heroes" with his fellow X Factor series seven contestants prior to his debut solo hit "When We Collide". Cher Lloyd, One Direction and Olly Murs would both go on to record top 10 singles in later years.

Travie McCoy of Gym Class Heroes had his first independent top 10 hit, collaborating with B.o.B. on "Billionaire". Brandon Flowers had multiple top 10 singles as part of The Killers and achieved the first under his own name in 2010 with "Crossfire", reaching a number 8 peak.

=== Songs from films ===
Original songs from various films entered the top 10 throughout the year. These included "We Dance On" (from StreetDance 3D) and "Club Can't Handle Me" (Step Up 3D).

=== Charity singles ===
A number of singles recorded for charity reached the top ten in the charts in 2010. These included "Everybody Hurts" by Helping Haiti and "Heroes" by The X Factor Finalists 2010.

=== Best-selling singles ===
Eminem featuring Rihanna had the best-selling single of the year with "Love the Way You Lie". The song spent fourteen weeks in the top 10 (peaking at number two), sold over 854,000 copies and was certified platinum by the BPI. "When We Collide" by Matt Cardle came in second place, selling more than 814,000 copies and losing out by around 40,000 sales. Bruno Mars's "Just the Way You Are, "Only Girl in the World" from Rihanna and "OMG" by Usher featuring will.i.am made up the top five. Singles by Owl City, B.o.B featuring Hayley Williams, Katy Perry featuring Snoop Dogg, Yolanda Be Cool & DCUP and Tinie Tempah were also in the top ten best-selling singles of the year.

== Top-ten singles ==
Key

Symbol	Meaning
‡	Single peaked in 2009 but still in chart in 2010.
♦	Single released in 2010 but peaked in 2011.
(#)	Year-end top ten single position and rank
Entered	The date that the single first appeared in the chart.
Peak	Highest position that the single reached in the UK Singles Chart.

Entered (week ending)	Weeks in top 10	Single	Artist	Peak	Peak reached (week ending)	Weeks at peak
Singles in 2009
7 November 2009	11	"Meet Me Halfway" ‡	Black Eyed Peas	1	21 November 2009	1
14 November 2009	11	"Bad Romance" ‡	Lady Gaga	1	19 December 2009	2
14 November 2009	9	"Tik Tok"	Kesha	4	9 January 2010	1
5 December 2009	6	"Russian Roulette" ‡	Rihanna	2	12 December 2009	1
19 December 2009	3	"Look for Me" ^{[EE]}	Chipmunk featuring Talay Riley	7	16 January 2010	1
26 December 2009	2	"Killing in the Name" ‡	Rage Against the Machine	1	26 December 2009	1
26 December 2009	3	"The Climb"	Joe McElderry	1	2 January 2010	1
26 December 2009	10	"Starstrukk"	3OH!3 featuring Katy Perry	3	16 January 2010	1
26 December 2009	3	"You Know Me" ‡	Robbie Williams	6	26 December 2009	1
26 December 2009	3	"3 Words"	Cheryl Cole featuring will.i.am	4	2 January 2010	1
26 December 2009	8	"Don't Stop Believin'"	Journey	6	16 January 2010	2
Singles in 2010
16 January 2010	6	"Replay"	Iyaz	1	16 January 2010	2
16 January 2010	4	"Riverside (Let's Go!)"	Sidney Samson featuring Wizard Sleeve	2	16 January 2010	1
16 January 2010	2	"You've Got the Love"	Florence and the Machine	5	16 January 2010	1
16 January 2010	1	"Ego"	The Saturdays	9	16 January 2010	1
23 January 2010	7	"Fireflies" (#6)	Owl City	1	30 January 2010	3
23 January 2010	6	"Don't Stop Believin'"	Glee cast	2	6 February 2010	1
23 January 2010	1	"Stay Too Long"	Plan B	9	23 January 2010	1
23 January 2010	2	"Broken Heels"	Alexandra Burke	8	30 January 2010	1
30 January 2010	3	"Won't Go Quietly"	Example	6	30 January 2010	1
30 January 2010	5	"One Shot" ^{[A]}	JLS	6	6 February 2010	1
6 February 2010	8	"Empire State of Mind (Part II) Broken Down"	Alicia Keys	4	20 February 2010	1
6 February 2010	1	"Young Forever"	Jay-Z featuring Mr Hudson	10	6 February 2010	1
13 February 2010	1	"Under Pressure (Ice Ice Baby)"	Jedward featuring Vanilla Ice	2	13 February 2010	1
13 February 2010	5	"If We Ever Meet Again"	Timbaland & Katy Perry	3	13 February 2010	2
20 February 2010	3	"Everybody Hurts" ^{[B]}	Helping Haiti	1	20 February 2010	2
20 February 2010	2	"Halo"/"Walking on Sunshine"	Glee cast	9	20 February 2010	2
20 February 2010	9	"Rude Boy"	Rihanna	2	13 March 2010	2
27 February 2010	5	"You Got the Dirtee Love" ^{[C]}	Florence and the Machine & Dizzee Rascal	2	27 February 2010	2
27 February 2010	1	"The Way Love Goes"	Lemar	8	27 February 2010	1
6 March 2010	5	"In My Head"	Jason Derulo	1	6 March 2010	1
6 March 2010	5	"Starry Eyed"	Ellie Goulding	4	6 March 2010	3
6 March 2010	1	"Wear My Kiss"	Sugababes	7	6 March 2010	1
13 March 2010	7	"Pass Out" (#10)	Tinie Tempah	1	13 March 2010	2
13 March 2010	1	"Never Be Your Woman"	Naughty Boy presents Wiley featuring Emeli Sandé	8	13 March 2010	1
13 March 2010	2	"Gave It All Away" ^{[D]}	Boyzone	9	13 March 2010	1
13 March 2010	6	"Parachute"	Cheryl Cole	5	3 April 2010	1
20 March 2010	5	"Baby"	Justin Bieber featuring Ludacris	3	20 March 2010	2
20 March 2010	1	"On a Mission"	Gabriella Cilmi	9	20 March 2010	1
20 March 2010	1	"My Name"	McLean	10	20 March 2010	1
27 March 2010	5	"Telephone"	Lady Gaga featuring Beyoncé	1	27 March 2010	2
27 March 2010	5	"Hot"	Inna	6	3 April 2010	1
3 April 2010	1	"BedRock"	Young Money featuring Lloyd	9	3 April 2010	1
10 April 2010	5	"This Ain't a Love Song"	Scouting for Girls	1	10 April 2010	2
10 April 2010	8	"She Said"	Plan B	3	10 April 2010	4
10 April 2010	1	"History Makers"	Delirious?	4	10 April 2010	1
10 April 2010	9	"OMG" (#5) ^{[E]}	Usher featuring will.i.am	1	24 April 2010	1
17 April 2010	4	"Carry Out"	Timbaland featuring Justin Timberlake	6	17 April 2010	1
24 April 2010	4	"I Need You Tonight"	Professor Green featuring Ed Drewett	3	24 April 2010	1
24 April 2010	5	"Acapella"	Kelis	5	24 April 2010	1
24 April 2010	2	"Naturally"	Selena Gomez & the Scene	7	24 April 2010	1
1 May 2010	3	"Once"	Diana Vickers	1	1 May 2010	1
1 May 2010	3	"Until You Were Gone"	Chipmunk featuring Esmée Denters	3	1 May 2010	1
1 May 2010	1	"The Best" ^{[F]}	Tina Turner	9	1 May 2010	1
8 May 2010	5	"Good Times"	Roll Deep	1	8 May 2010	3
8 May 2010	2	"Dirty Picture"	Taio Cruz featuring Kesha	6	15 May 2010	1
15 May 2010	1	"Watercolour"	Pendulum	4	15 May 2010	1
15 May 2010	5	"Candy"	Aggro Santos featuring Kimberly Wyatt	5	15 May 2010	3
22 May 2010	6	"Ridin' Solo"	Jason Derulo	2	22 May 2010	2
22 May 2010	4	"Stereo Love"	Edward Maya & Vika Jigulina	4	22 May 2010	1
22 May 2010	2	"She's Always a Woman"	Fyfe Dangerfield	7	22 May 2010	1
22 May 2010	2	"All Night Long"	Alexandra Burke featuring Pitbull	4	29 May 2010	1
22 May 2010	1	"Total Eclipse of the Heart"	Glee cast featuring Jonathan Groff	9	22 May 2010	1
29 May 2010	4	"Nothin' on You"	B.o.B featuring Bruno Mars	1	29 May 2010	1
29 May 2010	1	"Leeds, Leeds, Leeds (Marching On Together)"	Leeds United & Supporters	10	29 May 2010	1
5 June 2010	2	"Dirtee Disco"	Dizzee Rascal	1	5 June 2010	1
5 June 2010	2	"Solo"	Iyaz	3	5 June 2010	1
5 June 2010	6	"Not Afraid"	Eminem	5	5 June 2010	3
5 June 2010	2	"We Dance On"	N-Dubz featuring Bodyrox	6	5 June 2010	1
5 June 2010	2	"Eenie Meenie"	Sean Kingston & Justin Bieber	9	12 June 2010	1
12 June 2010	4	"Gettin' Over You"	David Guetta & Chris Willis featuring Fergie & LMFAO	1	12 June 2010	1
12 June 2010	2	"Try Sleeping with a Broken Heart"	Alicia Keys	7	12 June 2010	1
19 June 2010	3	"Shout"	Shout For England featuring Dizzee Rascal & James Corden	1	19 June 2010	2
19 June 2010	3	"Frisky"	Tinie Tempah featuring Labrinth	2	19 June 2010	1
19 June 2010	4	"Wavin' Flag"	K'naan	2	26 June 2010	2
19 June 2010	1	"Three Lions" ^{[G]}	Baddiel, Skinner & The Lightning Seeds	10	19 June 2010	1
26 June 2010	4	"Kickstarts"	Example	3	26 June 2010	1
26 June 2010	4	"All the Lovers"	Kylie Minogue	3	10 July 2010	1
26 June 2010	1	"Dancing on My Own"	Robyn	8	26 June 2010	1
26 June 2010	4	"Alejandro"	Lady Gaga	7	10 July 2010	1
3 July 2010	7	"California Gurls" (#8)	Katy Perry featuring Snoop Dogg	1	3 July 2010	2
3 July 2010	14	"Love the Way You Lie" (#1)	Eminem featuring Rihanna	2	31 July 2010	4
10 July 2010	9	"Airplanes" (#7)	B.o.B featuring Hayley Williams	1	24 July 2010	1
10 July 2010	4	"I Like It"	Enrique Iglesias featuring Pitbull	4	10 July 2010	1
10 July 2010	1	"Commander"	Kelly Rowland featuring David Guetta	9	10 July 2010	1
17 July 2010	3	"The Club Is Alive"	JLS	1	17 July 2010	1
17 July 2010	9	"We No Speak Americano" (#9)	Yolanda Be Cool & DCUP	1	31 July 2010	1
17 July 2010	3	"My First Kiss"	3OH!3 featuring Kesha	7	17 July 2010	1
24 July 2010	2	"Just Be Good to Green"	Professor Green featuring Lily Allen	5	24 July 2010	1
24 July 2010	2	"Bang Bang Bang"	Mark Ronson & The Business Intl.	6	24 July 2010	1
24 July 2010	6	"Pack Up"	Eliza Doolittle	5	31 July 2010	1
7 August 2010	4	"All Time Low"	The Wanted	1	7 August 2010	1
7 August 2010	6	"Billionaire"	Travie McCoy featuring Bruno Mars	3	7 August 2010	1
7 August 2010	8	"Club Can't Handle Me"	Flo Rida featuring David Guetta	1	21 August 2010	1
7 August 2010	2	"One (Your Name)"	Swedish House Mafia featuring Pharrell Williams	7	7 August 2010	1
7 August 2010	1	"I Need Air"	Magnetic Man	10	7 August 2010	1
14 August 2010	4	"Beautiful Monster"	Ne-Yo	1	14 August 2010	1
21 August 2010	2	"Missing You"	The Saturdays	3	21 August 2010	1
21 August 2010	1	"In My System"	Tinchy Stryder	10	21 August 2010	1
28 August 2010	3	"Green Light"	Roll Deep	1	28 August 2010	1
4 September 2010	7	"Dynamite"	Taio Cruz	1	4 September 2010	1
4 September 2010	6	"Katy on a Mission"	Katy B	5	4 September 2010	1
4 September 2010	1	"Crossfire"	Brandon Flowers	8	4 September 2010	1
11 September 2010	3	"Please Don't Let Me Go"	Olly Murs	1	11 September 2010	1
11 September 2010	6	"Teenage Dream"	Katy Perry	2	11 September 2010	2
11 September 2010	1	"You Took My Heart"	Pepper & Piano	7	11 September 2010	1
18 September 2010	4	"Start Without You"	Alexandra Burke featuring Laza Morgan	1	18 September 2010	2
18 September 2010	4	"For the First Time"	The Script	4	18 September 2010	2
18 September 2010	1	"Party Girl"	McFly	6	18 September 2010	1
18 September 2010	1	"This Day"	Emma's Imagination	10	18 September 2010	1
25 September 2010	2	"DJ Got Us Fallin' in Love" ^{[H]}	Usher featuring Pitbull	7	25 September 2010	1
25 September 2010	2	"Impossible"	Shontelle	9	2 October 2010	1
2 October 2010	8	"Just the Way You Are" (#3)	Bruno Mars	1	2 October 2010	2
2 October 2010	1	"Focus"	Emma's Imagination	7	2 October 2010	1
2 October 2010	1	"I'm in Love (I Wanna Do It)"	Alex Gaudino	10	2 October 2010	1
9 October 2010	5	"Written in the Stars"	Tinie Tempah featuring Eric Turner	1	9 October 2010	1
9 October 2010	3	"Let the Sun Shine"	Labrinth	3	9 October 2010	1
9 October 2010	4	"Make You Feel My Love" ^{[I]}	Adele	4	9 October 2010	1
9 October 2010	2	"Heartbeat"	Enrique Iglesias featuring Nicole Scherzinger	8	9 October 2010	1
16 October 2010	6	"Forget You"	CeeLo Green	1	16 October 2010	2
16 October 2010	2	"Shame"	Robbie Williams & Gary Barlow	2	16 October 2010	1
16 October 2010	3	"Miami 2 Ibiza"	Swedish House Mafia vs. Tinie Tempah	4	23 October 2010	1
16 October 2010	1	"Radioactive"	Kings of Leon	7	16 October 2010	1
23 October 2010	4	"Barbra Streisand"	Duck Sauce	3	23 October 2010	2
23 October 2010	1	"Ambitions"	Joe McElderry	6	23 October 2010	1
23 October 2010	5	"Cooler than Me"	Mike Posner	5	6 November 2010	1
30 October 2010	2	"Heart Vacancy"	The Wanted	2	30 October 2010	1
30 October 2010	9	"Firework" ^{[L]}	Katy Perry	3	20 November 2010	1
30 October 2010	1	"2012 (It Ain't the End)"	Jay Sean featuring Nicki Minaj	9	30 October 2010	1
30 October 2010	1	"Best Behaviour"	N-Dubz	10	30 October 2010	1
6 November 2010	3	"Promise This"	Cheryl Cole	1	6 November 2010	1
6 November 2010	11	"Only Girl (In the World)" (#4)	Rihanna	1	13 November 2010	2
6 November 2010	2	"Just a Dream"	Nelly	8	6 November 2010	2
13 November 2010	3	"Happiness"	Alexis Jordan	3	13 November 2010	1
13 November 2010	1	"Higher"	The Saturdays featuring Flo Rida	10	13 November 2010	1
20 November 2010	6	"The Flood" ^{[K]}	Take That	2	20 November 2010	2
20 November 2010	2	"Shine a Light"	McFly featuring Taio Cruz	4	20 November 2010	1
27 November 2010	3	"Love You More" ^{[CC]}	JLS	1	27 November 2010	1
27 November 2010	7	"Your Song"	Ellie Goulding	2	4 December 2010	2
27 November 2010	6	"Like a G6" ^{[L]}	Far East Movement featuring The Cataracs & Dev	5	11 December 2010	1
27 November 2010	8	"The Time (Dirty Bit)" ^{[J]}	Black Eyed Peas	1	18 December 2010	1
27 November 2010	1	"Safe"	Westlife	10	27 November 2010	1
4 December 2010	3	"Heroes"	The X Factor Finalists 2010	1	4 December 2010	2
4 December 2010	4	"Thinking of Me"	Olly Murs	4	4 December 2010	2
4 December 2010	9	"What's My Name?" ♦	Rihanna featuring Drake	1	15 January 2011	1
11 December 2010	2	"Poison"	Nicole Scherzinger	3	11 December 2010	1
11 December 2010	4	"Who's That Chick?" ♦	David Guetta featuring Rihanna	6	22 January 2011	1
18 December 2010	4	"Whip My Hair"	Willow	2	18 December 2010	1
25 December 2010	5	"When We Collide" (#2)	Matt Cardle	1	25 December 2010	3
25 December 2010	1	"Surfin' Bird"	The Trashmen	3	25 December 2010	1
25 December 2010	1	"Many of Horror"	Biffy Clyro	8	25 December 2010	1
25 December 2010	1	"Hold My Hand"	Michael Jackson & Akon	10	25 December 2010	1

== Entries by artist ==
The following table shows artists who achieved two or more top 10 entries in 2010, including singles that reached their peak in 2009 or 2011. The figures include both main artists and featured artists, while appearances on ensemble charity records are also counted for each artist. The total number of weeks an artist spent in the top ten in 2010 is also shown.

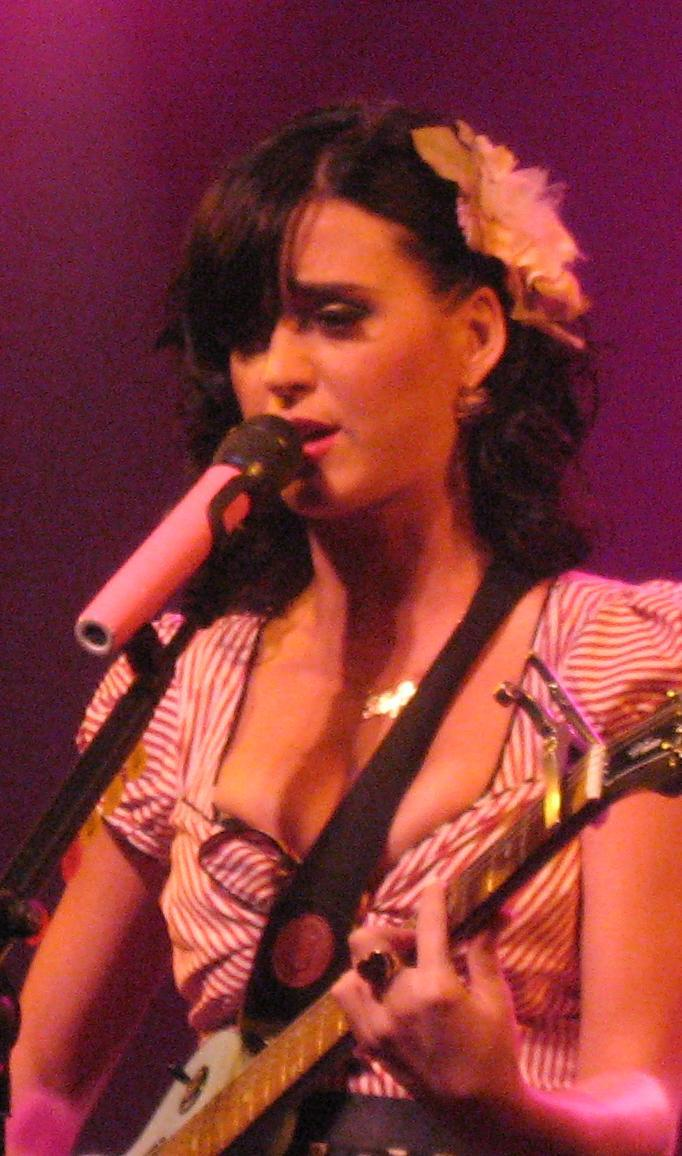
Katy Perry had five UK top 10 singles this year, the most successful of which was the number-one hit "California Gurls", which features guest vocals from Snoop Dogg.

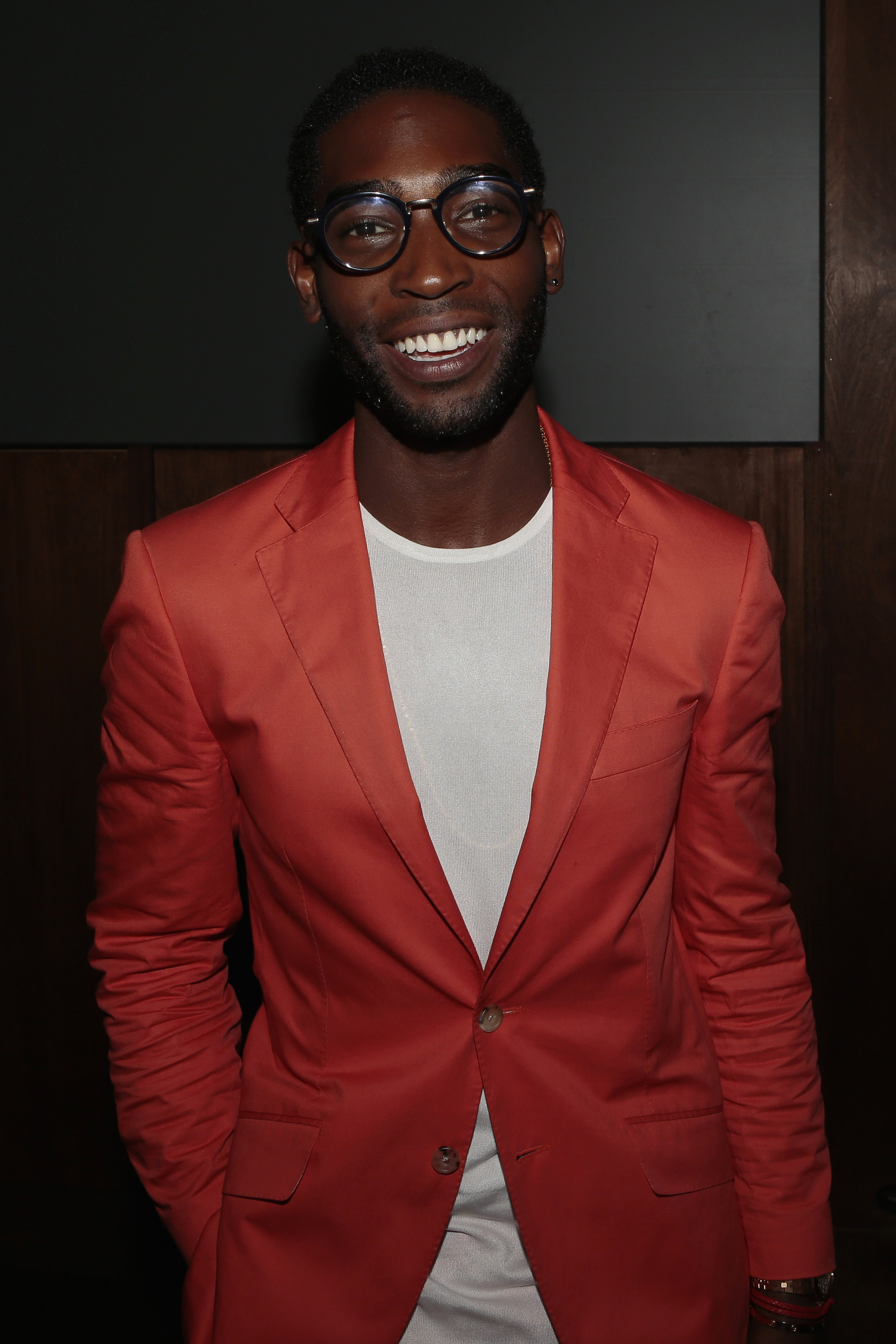
Tinie Tempah made his UK top 10 debut in 2010 with four singles making the countdown. Two of these reached number-one: "Pass Out" and "Written in the Stars" (which features vocals from American singer Eric Turner).

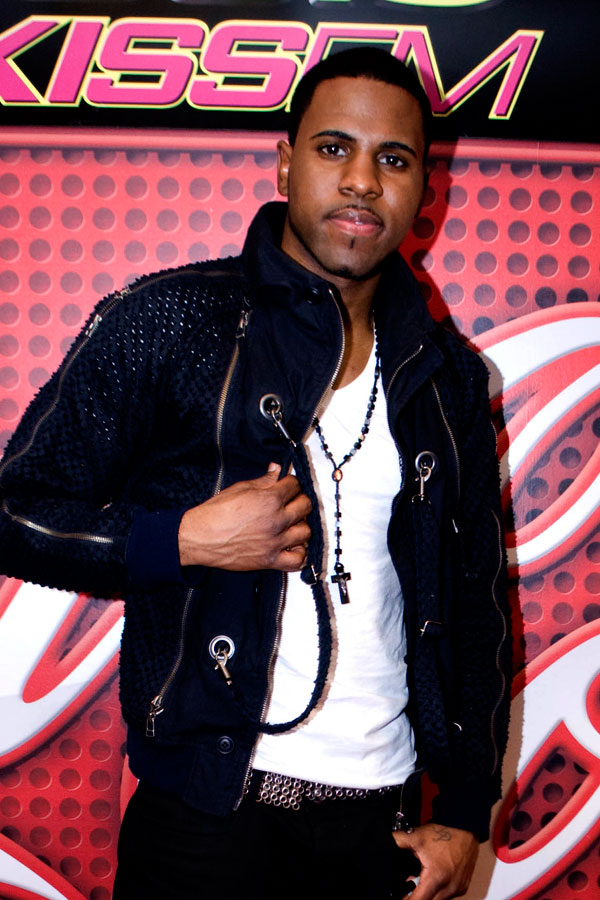
American singer Jason Derulo scored two top 10 entries this year, including "In My Head", which became his first UK number-one single.

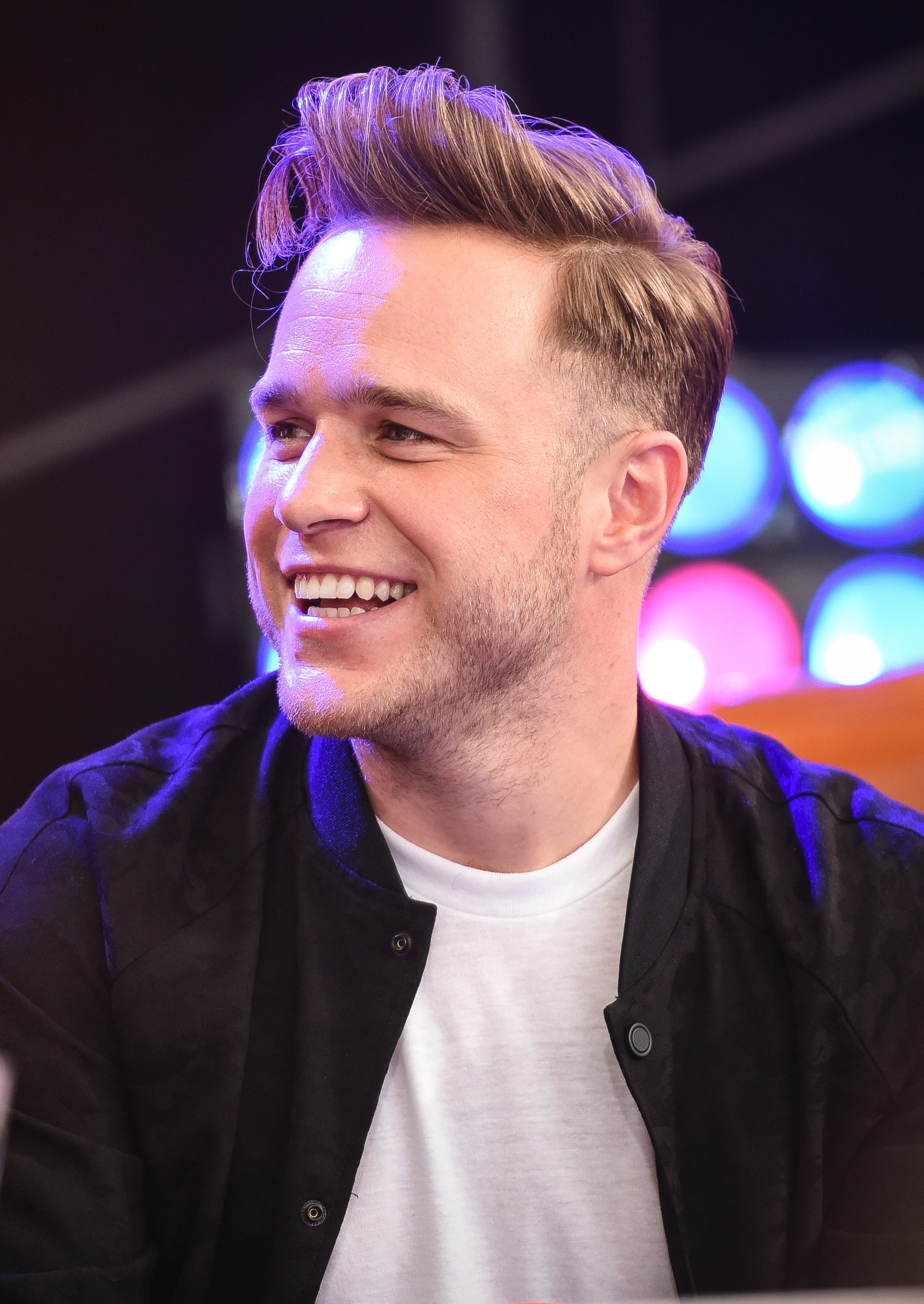
Olly Murs, who finished runner-up in the sixth series of The X Factor, made the UK top 10 for the first time this year, scoring two entries, including his debut single "Please Don't Let Me Go", which reached number-one in September.

Entries	Artist	Weeks	Singles
6	Rihanna ^{[M]}^{[V]}^{[W]}	40	"Love the Way You Lie", "Only Girl (In the World)", "Rude Boy", "Russian Roulette", "What's My Name?", "Who's That Chick?"
5	Katy Perry ^{[N]}^{[DD]}	36	"California Gurls", "Firework", "If We Ever Meet Again", "Starstrukk", "Teenage Dream"
4	Alexandra Burke ^{[O]}	11	"All Night Long", "Broken Heels", "Everybody Hurts", "Start Without You"
4	Cheryl Cole ^{[O]}^{[V]}^{[DD]}	14	"3 Words", "Everybody Hurts", "Parachute", "Promise This"
4	David Guetta ^{[AA]}	16	"Club Can't Handle Me", "Commander", "Gettin' Over You", "Who's That Chick?"
4	JLS ^{[O]}	14	"The Club is Alive", "Everybody Hurts", "Love You More", "One Shot"
4	Robbie Williams ^{[O]}^{[BB]}	13	"Everybody Hurts", "The Flood", "Shame", "You Know Me"
4	Tinie Tempah ^{[P]}	18	"Frisky", "Miami 2 Ibiza", "Pass Out", "Written in the Stars"
4	will.i.am ^{[V]}^{[X]}^{[Y]}^{[DD]}	19	"3 Words", "Meet Me Halfway", "OMG", "The Time (Dirty Bit)"
3	Bruno Mars ^{[Q]}	18	"Billionaire", "Just the Way You Are", "Nothin' on You"
3	Dizzee Rascal ^{[R]}^{[Z]}	10	"Dirtee Disco", "Shout", "You Got the Dirtee Love"
3	Fergie	12	"Gettin' Over You", "Meet Me Halfway", "The Time (Dirty Bit)"
3	Gary Barlow ^{[O]}^{[BB]}	11	"Everybody Hurts", "The Flood", "Shame"
3	Glee cast	9	"Don't Stop Believin'", "Halo"/"Walking on Sunshine", "Total Eclipse of the Heart"
3	Joe McElderry ^{[O]}^{[DD]}	6	"Ambitions", "The Climb", "Everybody Hurts"
3	Kesha ^{[S]}^{[DD]}	7	"Dirty Picture", "My First Kiss", "TiK ToK"
3	Lady Gaga ^{[V]}	13	"Alejandro", "Bad Romance", "Telephone"
3	Pitbull ^{[T]}	8	"All Night Long", "DJ Got Us Fallin' in Love", "I Like It"
3	The Saturdays	4	"Ego", "Higher", "Missing You"
3	Taio Cruz ^{[U]}	11	"Dirty Picture", "Dynamite", "Shine a Light"
2	3OH!3	12	"My First Kiss", "Starstrukk"
2	Alicia Keys	10	"Empire State of Mind (Part II) Broken Down", "Try Sleeping with a Broken Heart"
2	B.o.B	13	"Airplanes", "Nothin' on You"
2	Black Eyed Peas	8	"Meet Me Halfway", "The Time (Dirty Bit)"
2	Chipmunk ^{[DD]}	5	"Look for Me", "Until You Were Gone"
2	Drake ^{[FF]}^{[II]}	3	"BedRock", "What's My Name?"
2	Ellie Goulding	10	"Starry Eyed", "Your Song"
2	Eminem	20	"Love the Way You Lie", "Not Afraid"
2	Emma's Imagination	2	"Focus", "This Day"
2	Enrique Iglesias	6	"Heartbeat", "I Like It"
2	Example	7	"Kickstarts", "Won't Go Quietly"
2	Flo Rida ^{[JJ]}	9	"Club Can't Handle Me", "Higher"
2	Florence and the Machine	7	"You Got the Dirtee Love", "You've Got the Love"
2	Iyaz	8	"Replay", "Solo"
2	Jason Derulo	11	"In My Head", "Ridin' Solo"
2	Justin Bieber	7	"Baby", "Eenie Meenie"
2	Kylie Minogue ^{[O]}	7	"All the Lovers", "Everybody Hurts"
2	Labrinth ^{[KK]}	6	"Frisky", "Let the Sun Shine"
2	Matt Cardle ^{[GG]}	4	"Heroes", "When We Collide"
2	McFly	3	"Party Girl", "Shine a Light"
2	N-Dubz	3	"Best Behaviour", "We Dance On"
2	Nicki Minaj ^{[FF]}^{[HH]}	2	"2012 (It Ain't the End)", "BedRock"
2	Nicole Scherzinger ^{[LL]}	4	"Heartbeat", "Poison"
2	Olly Murs	7	"Please Don't Let Me Go", "Thinking of Me"
2	Plan B	9	"She Said", "Stay Too Long"
2	Professor Green	6	"I Need You Tonight", "Just Be Good to Green"
2	Roll Deep	8	"Good Times", "Green Light"
2	Swedish House Mafia	5	"Miami 2 Ibiza", "One (Your Name)"
2	Take That ^{[O]}	9	"Everybody Hurts", "The Flood"
2	Timbaland	9	"Carry Out", "If We Ever Meet Again"
2	Usher	11	"DJ Got Us Fallin' in Love", "OMG"
2	The Wanted	6	"All Time Low", "Heart Vacancy"
2	Westlife ^{[O]}	4	"Everybody Hurts", "Safe"

== Notes ==
- ^{a} "One Shot" re-entered the top 10 at number 10 on 6 March 2010 (week ending) following the physical release.
- ^{b} Released as a "Charity Single" towards the 2010 Haiti earthquake.
- ^{c} Released as a single towards The BRIT Trust.
- ^{d} "Gave It All Away" re-entered the top 10 at number 10 on 3 April 2010 (week ending).
- ^{e} "OMG" re-entered the top 10 at number 6 on 19 June 2010 (week ending) following a performance on Britain's Got Talent.
- ^{f} "The Best" originally peaked at number 5 in 1989, but re-entered the top 10 following a campaign by Rangers F.C. fans.
- ^{g} "Three Lions" originally peaked at number 1 in 1996, but re-entered the top 10 due to the World Cup.
- ^{h} "DJ Got Us Falling in Love" re-entered the top 10 at number 10 on 23 October 2010 (week ending) following a performance on The X Factor.
- ^{i} "Make You Feel My Love" re-entered the top 10 at number 9 on 19 November 2010 (week ending) following a performance from Rebecca Ferguson on The X Factor. The single re-entered for a second time on 4 December 2010 following the use of the song on The X Factor. It re-entered the top 10 for a third time at number 7 on 16 January 2011 following usage on Dancing on Ice.
- ^{j} "The Time (Dirty Bit)" re-entered the top 10 at number 6 on 11 December 2010 (week ending) following the release of the album The Beginning.
- ^{k} "The Flood" re-entered the top 10 at number 6 on 25 December 2010 (week ending) following a performance on The X Factor Final.
- ^{l} "Firework" re-entered the Top 10 at number 8 and "Like a G6" re-entered at number 10; both on 1 January 2011 (week ending).
- ^{m} Figure includes appearances on Eminem's "Love the Way You Lie" and David Guetta's "Who's That Chick?".
- ^{n} Figure includes appearances on 3OH!3's "Starstrukk" and Timbaland's "If We Ever Meet Again".
- ^{o} Figure includes appearance on the Helping Haiti charity single "Everybody Hurts".
- ^{p} Figure includes appearance on Swedish House Mafia's "Miami 2 Ibiza".
- ^{q} Figure includes appearances on B.o.B's "Nothin' on You" and Travie McCoy's "Billionaire".
- ^{r} Figure includes appearance on the 2010 FIFA World Cup song "Shout".
- ^{s} Figure includes appearances on Taio Cruz's "Dirty Picture" and 3OH!3's "My First Kiss".
- ^{t} Figure includes appearances on Alexandra Burke's "All Night Long", Enrique Iglesias' " Like It" and Usher's "DJ Got Us Fallin' in Love".
- ^{u} Figure includes appearance on McFly's "Shine a Light".
- ^{v} Figure includes song that peaked in 2009.
- ^{w} Figure includes song that peaked in 2011.
- ^{x} Figure includes two singles with the group The Black Eyed Peas.
- ^{y} Figure includes appearance on Cheryl Cole's "3 Words".
- ^{z} Figure includes appearance on Florence and the Machine's "You Got the Dirtee Love".
- ^{aa} Figure includes appearances on Flo Rida's "Club Can't Handle Me" and Kelly Rowland's "Commander".
- ^{bb} Figure includes a single with the group Take That.
- ^{cc} Released as the official single for Children in Need.
- ^{dd} Figure includes song that first charted in 2009 but peaked in 2010.
- ^{ee} "Look for Me" re-entered the top 10 at number 10 on 9 January 2010 (week ending), rising to number 7 the following week.
- ^{ff} Figure includes one top 10 single with the group Young Money.
- ^{gg} Figure includes appearance on "Heroes" as part of The X Factor UK 2010 finalists.
- ^{hh} Figure includes appearance on Jay Sean's "2012 (It Ain't the End)".
- ^{ii} Figure includes appearance on Rihanna's "What's My Name?".
- ^{jj} Figure includes appearance on The Saturday's "Higher".
- ^{kk} Figure includes appearance on Tinie Tempah's "Frisky".7
- ^{ll} Figure includes appearance on Enrique Iglesias' "Heartbeat".
- ^{mm} "What's My Name?" reached its peak of number one on 15 January 2011 (week ending).

== See also ==
- 2010 in British music
- List of UK Singles Chart number ones of the 2010s
