= 2010 in British music charts =

The British music charts are compiled by the Official Charts Company to measure sales of recorded music on compact disc and digital download.

== Summary ==
In early January, Iyaz's début single "Replay" went to number one. It became the first number one single of the 2010s; not counting Lady Gaga's "Bad Romance" which first reached number one in 2009. February saw the release of X Factor finalist Jedward's debut single, "Under Pressure (Ice Ice Baby)". Debuting at number one mid-month was the Helping Haiti single, a cover of "Everybody Hurts". The single, which was arranged by Simon Cowell, features 21 artists including Kylie Minogue, Cheryl, Leona Lewis, Robbie Williams, Mariah Carey, Rod Stewart and Susan Boyle. It recorded the biggest first-week sales of any single since 2000, selling over 453,000. All of the proceeds went to the Disasters Emergency Committee and The Sun's Helping Haiti charity.

The BRIT Awards on 16 February boosted the sales of both singles and albums; the songs performed on the BRIT Awards climbed the singles chart while the albums that won BRIT Awards climbed the albums chart. British artists received awards recognition overseas, with The Ting Tings, Adele, Seal, Imogen Heap, Pet Shop Boys and Coldplay nominated at the 52nd Grammy Awards. Also in February, the band Sade's first studio album in ten years, Soldier of Love, debuted at number one in the United States.

In March, rapper Tinie Tempah's debut single "Pass Out" entered the singles chart at number one, with sales of just over 92,000. In April, Scouting for Girls returned to the charts with their first UK number-one single "This Ain't a Love Song", the first single from their second album Everybody Wants to Be on TV. A Facebook group called Christian Music set up an Internet campaign to get Christian rock anthem "History Makers" by Delirious? to number one on Easter Sunday; it ended up getting to number four. Diana Vickers debuted at number one with "Once", and rapper Chipmunk and Dutch singer Esmée Denters secured a number-three hit with "Until You Were Gone". Tina Turner re-entered the top ten with "The Best", following an Internet campaign set up by fans of Glasgow Rangers Football Club in an attempt to get their unofficial anthem to number one.

May began with London rap collective Roll Deep releasing their first single since 2005, "Good Times", which was at number one for three weeks. Diana Vickers' debut album Songs From The Tainted Cherry Tree knocked Plan B's The Defamation of Strickland Banks off the top spot, making Vickers only the second X Factor non-winner whose debut single and album both topped their respective charts. At the end of the month, Dizzee Rascal scored his fourth number-one single with "Dirtee Disco" and Pendulum scored their first number-one album with Immersion.

June coincided with the FIFA World Cup competition, and seven World Cup-related songs entered the singles chart, including the number-one single "Shout for England" by Dizzee Rascal and James Corden, which was produced by Simon Cowell and released as a charity single. Oasis scored their seventh UK number-one album with their second compilation album, Time Flies... 1994–2009.

To begin the month of August, new British boyband The Wanted topped the UK Singles Chart with "All Time Low". The Iron Maiden album The Final Frontier was released to enormous acclaim from rock music reviewers. By September, reality television shows were starting to influence both the singles and albums charts. 2009 X Factor runner-up Olly Murs topped the singles chart with "Please Don't Let Me Go", followed by Alexandra Burke, winner of X Factor 2008, with her sixth single "Start Without You" (featuring American rapper Laza Morgan). Artists from Sky1's new reality TV show Must Be the Music achieved success during this month, including the eventual winner Emma's Imagination. Some songs used on the audition stages of X Factor 2010 also re-entered the chart, including Adele's "Make You Feel My Love" (originally recorded by Bob Dylan).

In October, Tinie Tempah repeated his initial success by topping the singles chart with "Written in the Stars" and the album chart with debut album Disc-Overy. "Ambitions" by X Factor 2009 winner Joe McElderry reached the top ten, and his album Wide Awake the top five, although sales were below expectations. The show's judge Cheryl topped the charts with "Promise This" and Messy Little Raindrops.

During November, every number-one single had been performed live on The X Factor. Take That's much anticipated comeback with Robbie Williams started successfully; new single "The Flood" reached number two, and album Progress topped the album chart for the rest of the year. The X Factor Finalists of 2010 topped the singles chart with a cover of David Bowie's "Heroes".

The winner of that show, Matt Cardle, took the Christmas number-one of 2010, with winning single "When We Collide", a cover of the Biffy Clyro song "Many of Horror". The single sold over 700,000 copies, making it the third best-selling X Factor winning single. It also prompted the re-entry of the original version of the song by Biffy Clyro. Several internet campaigns were initiated in an unsuccessful attempt to topple X Factor following the success of the Rage Against the Machine campaign in 2009.

== Number ones ==
=== Singles ===
| Chart date (week ending) | Song | Artist | Sales |
|---|---|---|---|
| 2 January | "The Climb" | Joe McElderry | 195,730 |
| 9 January | "Bad Romance" | Lady Gaga | 76,265 |
| 16 January | "Replay" | Iyaz | 106,237 |
| 23 January | "Replay" | Iyaz | 86,814 |
| 30 January | "Fireflies" | Owl City | 71,866 |
| 6 February | "Fireflies" | Owl City | 79,911 |
| 13 February | "Fireflies" | Owl City | 77,669 |
| 20 February | "Everybody Hurts" | Helping Haiti | 453,426 |
| 27 February | "Everybody Hurts" | Helping Haiti | 102,769 |
| 6 March | "In My Head" | Jason Derülo | 68,134 |
| 13 March | "Pass Out" | Tinie Tempah featuring Labrinth | 92,002 |
| 20 March | "Pass Out" | Tinie Tempah featuring Labrinth | 64,573 |
| 27 March | "Telephone" | Lady Gaga featuring Beyoncé | 65,561 |
| 3 April | "Telephone" | Lady Gaga featuring Beyoncé | 58,299 |
| 10 April | "This Ain't a Love Song" | Scouting for Girls | 71,954 |
| 17 April | "This Ain't a Love Song" | Scouting for Girls | 52,393 |
| 24 April | "OMG" | Usher featuring will.i.am | 58,385 |
| 1 May | "Once" | Diana Vickers | 69,407 |
| 8 May | "Good Times" | Roll Deep | 66,523 |
| 15 May | "Good Times" | Roll Deep | 52,376 |
| 22 May | "Good Times" | Roll Deep | 48,593 |
| 29 May | "Nothin' on You" | B.o.B featuring Bruno Mars | 85,333 |
| 5 June | "Dirtee Disco" | Dizzee Rascal | 69,757 |
| 12 June | "Gettin' Over You" | David Guetta & Chris Willis featuring Fergie and LMFAO | 48,827 |
| 19 June | "Shout" | Shout for England featuring Dizzee Rascal and James Corden | 113,258 |
| 26 June | "Shout" | Shout for England featuring Dizzee Rascal and James Corden | 84,145 |
| 3 July | "California Gurls" | Katy Perry featuring Snoop Dogg | 123,607 |
| 10 July | "California Gurls" | Katy Perry featuring Snoop Dogg | 93,363 |
| 17 July | "The Club Is Alive" | JLS | 84,283 |
| 24 July | "Airplanes" | B.o.B featuring Hayley Williams | 75,892 |
| 31 July | "We No Speak Americano" | Yolanda Be Cool & DCUP | 89,107 |
| 7 August | "All Time Low" | The Wanted | 84,173 |
| 14 August | "Beautiful Monster" | Ne-Yo | 69,387 |
| 21 August | "Club Can't Handle Me" | Flo Rida featuring David Guetta | 61,027 |
| 28 August | "Green Light" | Roll Deep | 57,411 |
| 4 September | "Dynamite" | Taio Cruz | 108,397 |
| 11 September | "Please Don't Let Me Go" | Olly Murs | 93,239 |
| 18 September | "Start Without You" | Alexandra Burke | 73,306 |
| 25 September | "Start Without You" | Alexandra Burke | 53,123 |
| 2 October | "Just the Way You Are" | Bruno Mars | 82,855 |
| 9 October | "Written in the Stars" | Tinie Tempah featuring Eric Turner | 115,073 |
| 16 October | "Fuck You" | CeeLo Green | 106,962 |
| 23 October | "Fuck You" | CeeLo Green | 76,331 |
| 30 October | "Just the Way You Are" | Bruno Mars | 116,684 |
| 6 November | "Promise This" | Cheryl | 157,210 |
| 13 November | "Only Girl (In the World)" | Rihanna | 134,540 |
| 20 November | "Only Girl (In the World)" | Rihanna | 93,426 |
| 27 November | "Love You More" | JLS | 118,551 |
| 4 December | "Heroes" | X Factor Finalists 2010 | 144,014 |
| 11 December | "Heroes" | X Factor Finalists 2010 | 70,597 |
| 18 December | "The Time (Dirty Bit)" | The Black Eyed Peas | 74,918 |
| 25 December | "When We Collide" | Matt Cardle | 439,007 |

=== Albums ===
Key
| † | Best-selling album of the year |

| Chart date (week ending) | Album | Artist | Sales |
|---|---|---|---|
| 2 January | Crazy Love | Michael Bublé | 243,226 |
| 9 January | Sunny Side Up | Paolo Nutini | 58,082 |
| 16 January | Sunny Side Up | Paolo Nutini | 49,698 |
| 23 January | Lungs | Florence + the Machine | 51,005 |
| 30 January | Lungs | Florence + the Machine | 42,360 |
| 6 February | Sunny Side Up | Paolo Nutini | 35,739 |
| 13 February | The Element of Freedom | Alicia Keys | 35,336 |
| 20 February | The Element of Freedom | Alicia Keys | 57,312 |
| 27 February | Glee: The Music, Volume 1 | Glee Cast | 62,451 |
| 6 March | The Fame Monster | Lady Gaga | 45,358 |
| 13 March | Lights | Ellie Goulding | 36,854 |
| 20 March | Brother | Boyzone | 101,096 |
| 27 March | The Fame Monster | Lady Gaga | 45,025 |
| 3 April | Brother | Boyzone | 61,886 |
| 10 April | Brother | Boyzone | 45,267 |
| 17 April | The Fame Monster | Lady Gaga | 25,211 |
| 24 April | The Defamation of Strickland Banks | Plan B | 68,173 |
| 1 May | Iron Man 2 | AC/DC | 56,936 |
| 8 May | The Defamation of Strickland Banks | Plan B | 41,001 |
| 15 May | Songs from the Tainted Cherry Tree | Diana Vickers | 35,951 |
| 22 May | Night Train | Keane | 28,063 |
| 29 May | Exile on Main St. | The Rolling Stones | 31,287 |
| 5 June | Immersion | Pendulum | 58,859 |
| 12 June | To the Sea | Jack Johnson | 27,254 |
| 19 June | Bionic | Christina Aguilera | 24,300 |
| 26 June | Time Flies... 1994–2009 | Oasis | 101,297 |
| 3 July | Recovery | Eminem | 141,023 |
| 10 July | Recovery | Eminem | 69,045 |
| 17 July | Aphrodite | Kylie Minogue | 79,153 |
| 24 July | Recovery | Eminem | 49,616 |
| 31 July | Recovery | Eminem | 41,593 |
| 7 August | Recovery | Eminem | 39,864 |
| 14 August | The Suburbs | Arcade Fire | 61,263 |
| 21 August | Recovery | Eminem | 32,097 |
| 28 August | The Final Frontier | Iron Maiden | 44,384 |
| 4 September | Recovery | Eminem | 27,081 |
| 11 September | Teenage Dream | Katy Perry | 54,176 |
| 18 September | Flamingo | Brandon Flowers | 65,518 |
| 25 September | Science & Faith | The Script | 70,816 |
| 2 October | Going Back | Phil Collins | 40,684 |
| 9 October | Science & Faith | The Script | 34,313 |
| 16 October | Disc-Overy | Tinie Tempah | 84,993 |
| 23 October | In and Out of Consciousness: The Greatest Hits 1990–2010 | Robbie Williams | 124,689 |
| 30 October | Come Around Sundown | Kings of Leon | 183,298 |
| 6 November | Come Around Sundown | Kings of Leon | 72,611 |
| 13 November | Messy Little Raindrops | Cheryl | 105,431 |
| 20 November | The Gift | Susan Boyle | 102,993 |
| 27 November | Progress † | Take That | 518,601 |
| 4 December | Progress † | Take That | 208,220 |
| 11 December | Progress † | Take That | 176,881 |
| 18 December | Progress † | Take That | 203,210 |
| 25 December | Progress † | Take That | 330,252 |

=== Compilation albums ===
| Chart date (week ending) | Album |
|---|---|
| 2 January | Now 74 |
| 9 January | Now 74 |
| 16 January | Anthems – Electronic 80s |
| 23 January | Running Trax |
| 30 January | Running Trax |
| 6 February | Hope For Haiti Now |
| 13 February | R&B Lovesongs 2010 |
| 20 February | R&B Lovesongs 2010 |
| 27 February | BRIT Awards 2010 With MasterCard |
| 6 March | BRIT Awards 2010 With MasterCard |
| 13 March | Mash Up Mix 90s |
| 20 March | Forever Friends – Mum in a Million |
| 27 March | Massive R&B – Spring 2010 |
| 3 April | Massive R&B – Spring 2010 |
| 10 April | Now 75 |
| 17 April | Now 75 |
| 24 April | Now 75 |
| 1 May | Now 75 |
| 8 May | Now 75 |
| 15 May | Now 75 |
| 22 May | Now 75 |
| 29 May | Chilled Acoustic |
| 5 June | R&B Clubland |
| 12 June | R&B Clubland |
| 19 June | The Twilight Saga – Eclipse |
| 26 June | American Anthems |
| 3 July | American Anthems |
| 10 July | Clubland 17 |
| 17 July | Clubland 17 |
| 24 July | Anthems R&B |
| 31 July | Now 76 |
| 7 August | Now 76 |
| 14 August | Now 76 |
| 21 August | Now 76 |
| 28 August | Now 76 |
| 4 September | Now 76 |
| 11 September | Now 76 |
| 18 September | Now 76 |
| 25 September | Now 76 |
| 2 October | Now 76 |
| 9 October | Now 76 |
| 16 October | R&B in the Mix 2010 |
| 23 October | R&B in the Mix 2010 |
| 30 October | Now Dance 2010 |
| 6 November | BBC Radio 1's Live Lounge – Vol 5 |
| 13 November | Dreamboats & Petticoats 4 |
| 20 November | Clubland 18 |
| 27 November | Pop Party 8 |
| 4 December | Now 77 |
| 11 December | Now 77 |
| 18 December | Now 77 |
| 25 December | Now 77 |

== Year-end charts ==
=== Best-selling singles ===
For the first time in British music history, a song that never reached number one on the weekly chart became the biggest-selling single of the year. "Love the Way You Lie", by Eminem featuring Rihanna, also sold all its singles in digital format.

| No. | Title | Artist | Peak position | Sales |
|---|---|---|---|---|
| 1 | "Love the Way You Lie" | Eminem featuring Rihanna | 2 | 854,144 |
| 2 | "When We Collide" | Matt Cardle | 1 | 814,997 |
| 3 | "Just the Way You Are" | Bruno Mars | 1 | 765,899 |
| 4 | "Only Girl (In the World)" | Rihanna | 1 | 711,819 |
| 5 | "OMG" | Usher featuring will.i.am | 1 | 675,000 |
| 6 | "Fireflies" | Owl City | 1 | |
| 7 | "Airplanes" | B.o.B featuring Hayley Williams | 1 | |
| 8 | "California Gurls" | Katy Perry featuring Snoop Dogg | 1 | |
| 9 | "We No Speak Americano" | Yolanda Be Cool vs. DCUP | 1 | |
| 10 | "Pass Out" | Tinie Tempah | 1 | |
| 11 | "Everybody Hurts" | Helping Haiti | 1 | |
| 12 | "Forget You" | Cee Lo Green | 1 | |
| 13 | "Empire State of Mind (Part II) Broken Down" | Alicia Keys | 4 | |
| 14 | "Rude Boy" | Rihanna | 2 | 551,735 |
| 15 | "Telephone" | Lady Gaga featuring Beyoncé | 1 | |
| 16 | "She Said" | Plan B | 3 | |
| 17 | "Dynamite" | Taio Cruz | 1 | |
| 18 | "Replay" | Iyaz | 1 | |
| 19 | "Firework" | Katy Perry | 3 | |
| 20 | "Club Can't Handle Me" | Flo Rida featuring David Guetta | 1 | |
| 21 | "Your Song" | Ellie Goulding | 2 | |
| 22 | "Ridin' Solo" | Jason Derulo | 2 | |
| 23 | "Billionaire" | Travie McCoy featuring Bruno Mars | 3 | 442,431 |
| 24 | "Don't Stop Believin'" | Glee cast | 2 | 438,882 |
| 25 | "Don't Stop Believin'" | Journey | 6 | 435,103 |
| 26 | "The Time (Dirty Bit)" | The Black Eyed Peas | 1 | |
| 27 | "What's My Name?" | Rihanna featuring Drake | 2 (Note: Reached number 1 in 2011) | |
| 28 | "Pack Up" | Eliza Doolittle | 5 | |
| 29 | "Starstrukk" | 3OH!3 featuring Katy Perry | 3 | |
| 30 | "Bad Romance" | Lady Gaga | 1 | |
| 31 | "Written in the Stars" | Tinie Tempah featuring Eric Turner | 1 | |
| 32 | "Teenage Dream" | Katy Perry | 2 | |
| 33 | "Cooler than Me" | Mike Posner | 5 | |
| 34 | "Not Afraid" | Eminem | 5 | |
| 35 | "The Flood" | Take That | 2 | |
| 36 | "All Time Low" | The Wanted | 1 | |
| 37 | "If We Ever Meet Again" | Timbaland featuring Katy Perry | 3 | |
| 38 | "Riverside (Let's Go!)" | Sidney Samson featuring Wizard Sleeve | 2 | |
| 39 | "Promise This" | Cheryl Cole | 1 | |
| 40 | "In My Head" | Jason Derulo | 1 | |
| 41 | "This Ain't a Love Song" | Scouting for Girls | 1 | |
| 42 | "Starry Eyed" | Ellie Goulding | 4 | |
| 43 | "Wavin' Flag" | K'naan | 2 | |
| 44 | "Kickstarts" | Example | 3 | |
| 45 | "Nothin' on You" | B.o.B featuring Bruno Mars | 1 | 367,038 |
| 46 | "Alejandro" | Lady Gaga | 7 | |
| 47 | "Baby" | Justin Bieber featuring Ludacris | 3 | |
| 48 | "Make You Feel My Love" | Adele | 4 | |
| 49 | "Parachute" | Cheryl Cole | 5 | |
| 50 | "Frisky" | Tinie Tempah featuring Labrinth | 2 | |

=== Best-selling albums ===
| No. | Title | Artist | Peak position | Sales |
|---|---|---|---|---|
| 1 | Progress | Take That | 1 | 1,841,148 |
| 2 | Crazy Love | Michael Bublé | 1 | 1,227,909 |
| 3 | The Fame/The Fame Monster | Lady Gaga | 1 | 1,051,909 |
| 4 | Loud | Rihanna | 2 (Note: Reached number 1 in 2011) | 839,608 |
| 5 | The Defamation of Strickland Banks | Plan B | 1 | |
| 6 | Sunny Side Up | Paolo Nutini | 1 | |
| 7 | The Element of Freedom | Alicia Keys | 1 | |
| 8 | Lungs | Florence and the Machine | 1 | |
| 9 | Recovery | Eminem | 1 | |
| 10 | Sigh No More | Mumford & Sons | 3 (Note: Reached number 2 in 2011) | |
| 11 | Come Around Sundown | Kings of Leon | 1 | |
| 12 | My World | Justin Bieber | 3 | |
| 13 | The Gift | Susan Boyle | 1 | 556,933 |
| 14 | In and Out of Consciousness: Greatest Hits 1990–2010 | Robbie Williams | 1 | |
| 15 | Teenage Dream | Katy Perry | 1 | |
| 16 | Greatest Hits | Bon Jovi | 2 | |
| 17 | Turn It Up | Pixie Lott | 7 (Note: Reached number 6 in 2009) | |
| 18 | Outta This World | JLS | 2 | |
| 19 | Science & Faith | The Script | 1 | |
| 20 | Olly Murs | Olly Murs | 2 | |
| 21 | Messy Little Raindrops | Cheryl Cole | 1 | |
| 22 | Glee: The Music, Volume 1 | Glee Cast | 1 | |
| 23 | The E.N.D | The Black Eyed Peas | 3 | |
| 24 | Lights | Ellie Goulding | 1 | |
| 25 | Brother | Boyzone | 1 | |
| 26 | Only Revolutions | Biffy Clyro | 3 | |
| 27 | Forever Vienna | André Rieu | 2 | |
| 28 | Rated R | Rihanna | 9 | |
| 29 | Disc-Overy | Tinie Tempah | 1 | |
| 30 | Moonlight Serenade | André Rieu and His Johann Strauss Orchestra | 4 | |
| 31 | Only By the Night | Kings of Leon | 11 (Note: Reached number 1 in 2008) | |
| 32 | Greatest Hits... So Far!!! | Pink | 5 | |
| 33 | JLS | JLS | 8 (Note: Reached number 1 in 2009) | |
| 34 | Gravity | Westlife | 3 | |
| 35 | 3 Words | Cheryl Cole | 12 (Note: Reached number 1 in 2009) | |
| 36 | Seasons of My Soul | Rumer | 3 | |
| 37 | xx | The xx | 3 | |
| 38 | Time Flies... 1994–2009 | Oasis | 1 | |
| 39 | Iron Man 2 | AC/DC | 1 | |
| 40 | Plastic Beach | Gorillaz | 2 | |
| 41 | The Wanted | The Wanted | 4 | |
| 42 | Do You Want the Truth or Something Beautiful? | Paloma Faith | 13 (Note: Reached number 9 in 2009) | |
| 43 | Overcome | Alexandra Burke | 18 (Note: Reached number 1 in 2009) | |
| 44 | Eliza Doolittle | Eliza Doolittle | 3 | |
| 45 | Aphrodite | Kylie Minogue | 1 | |
| 46 | The Beginning | The Black Eyed Peas | 8 | |
| 47 | Glee: The Music, Volume 2 | Glee Cast | 2 | |
| 48 | I Am... Sasha Fierce | Beyoncé | 15 (Note: Reached number 2 in 2009) | |
| 49 | Jason Derulo | Jason Derulo | 8 | |
| 50 | Fly Me to the Moon... The Great American Songbook Volume V | Rod Stewart | 5 | |

=== Best-selling compilation albums ===
| No. | Title | Peak position | Sales |
|---|---|---|---|
| 1 | Now 77 | 1 | 1,195,244 |
| 2 | Now 76 | 1 | |
| 3 | Now 75 | 1 | |
| 4 | American Anthems | 1 | |
| 5 | Pop Party 8: 21 Massive Hits | 1 | |
| 6 | Anthems: Electronic 80s 2 | 2 | |
| 7 | Forever Love: 20 Cool Classics | 1 | |
| 8 | 80s Groove: Old Skool Funk Soul Classics | 2 | |
| 9 | Dreamboats and Petticoats Four | 1 | |
| 10 | Radio 1's Live Lounge – Volume 5 | 1 | |

== See also ==
- List of number-one singles from 2010
- List of number-one albums from 2010
- List of UK top-ten singles in 2010
- 2010s in music
- List of 2010 albums
- 2010 in British television
