= After the Anthems =

Canadian band

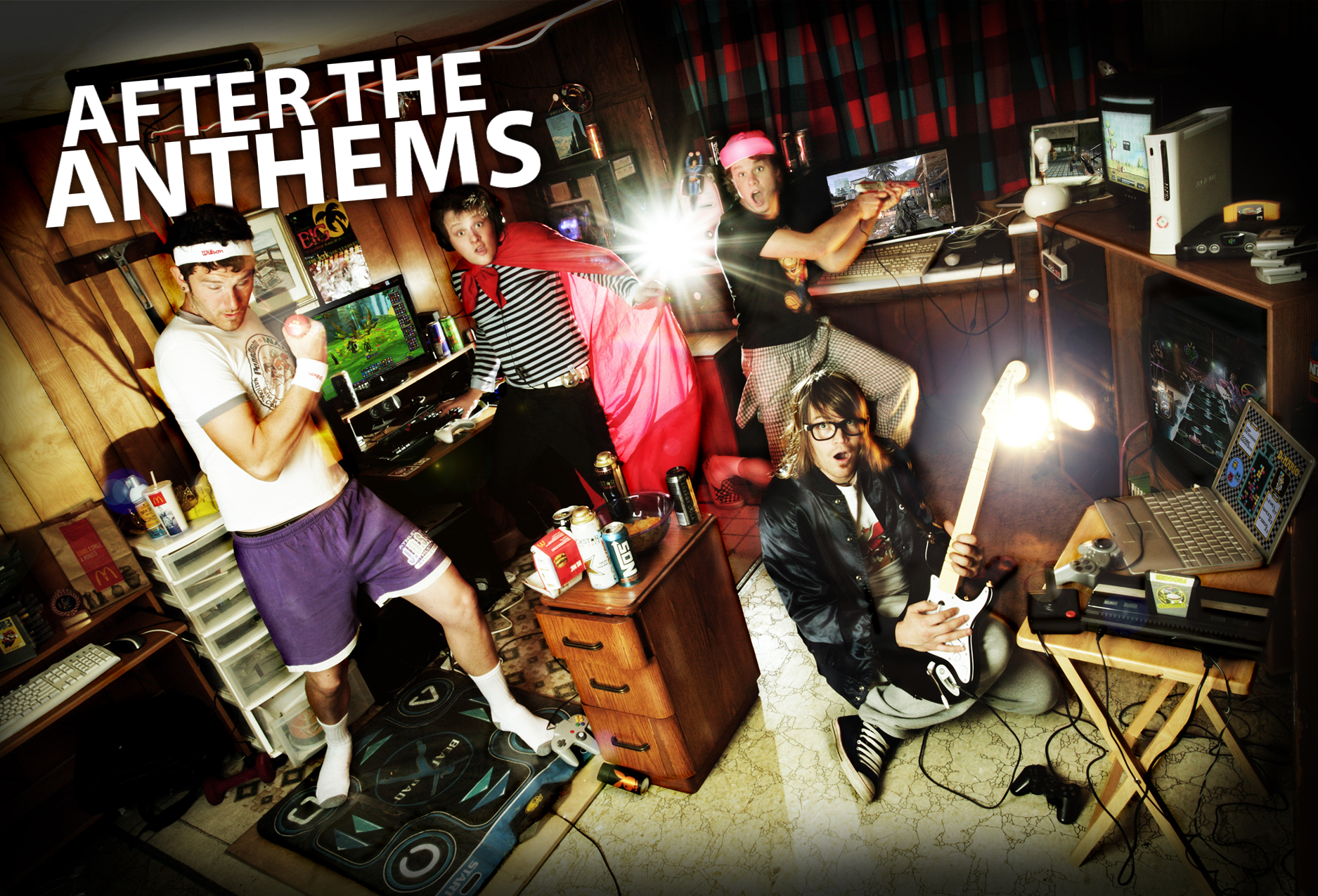
- Left to right: Krys Neerhof, Lee Zavitz, Phil Johnston, and Philip Ciufo

Background information
- Origin: Owen Sound, Ontario, Canada
- Genres: Pop rock, pop punk
- Years active: 2006–2011
- Past members: Philip Ciufo; Lee Zavitz; Phil Johnston; Dan Curry; Tim Stead; Jason Soloduik

After the Anthems was a Canadian rock band in Mississauga, Ontario, and originally from Owen Sound. The band formed in October 2006; their sound was described as 'pop/rock/punk'.

== History ==
=== Early bands and formation (2000–2006) ===
Philip Ciufo, Lee Zavitz, and Phil Johnston began playing together in 2000, in high school. When Johnston entered high school in 2000, he was recruited as their drummer. They formed the band 6 Days Late; the name was changed shortly afterward to Unidentified 6.

The band performed their first show during their junior year at their school. They played local shows and created four albums of songs collectively titled: Do Humans Look Like Their Pets?, Lights Go Out, Unaware, and Loser, as well as several untitled EPs which they distributed at their school. The band's title remained Unidentified 6 until 2004, when they changed their name to One Way Out. Up until that time, Zavitz played bass. After the name change, Tim Stead joined the trio to play bass while Zavitz switched to guitar.

One Way Out released a self-titled album in 2004 and an EP titled Salvage What's Left in 2005. Shortly after the release of their EP the band went on a short tour with John Reuben and also opened for Thousand Foot Krutch, Seventh Day Slumber, and Hawk Nelson. Stead then left the band and was replaced by long-time friend Dan Curry who played with the band until March 2006. At this time the four went on hiatus.

=== This is the Sound (2007) ===
In October 2006, Ciufo re-joined with Zavitz and Johnston to officially form After the Anthems. Over the course of 2006 and 2007, the three went on to record This is the Sound which was released in September 2007. In August, Jason Soloduik was added to the lineup to play bass. The band then went on tour throughout North America from October to December at which point Soloduik left the band.

On February 24, 2009, After the Anthems released a 6-song EP titled It's DejaVu All over Again. The album contained the cover version of the Huey Lewis and the News song "The Power of Love", as well as five new original songs. "The Power of Love" went to No. 1 on the CT20 in May 2009.

On April 29, 2010, the band released a mashup cover of three songs. One is titled "One Time I Replayed the Empire State of Mind" and is a cover of "One Time" by Justin Bieber, "Empire State of Mind" by Jay-Z and Alicia Keys, and "Replay" by Iyaz. The song was released on a new Facebook application called MuSwap. This was the first song released through MuSwap and went semi-viral receiving over 500 downloads on its first day.

=== What if the Astronauts Are Lying (2011) ===
The band released its last album on iTunes on February 19, 2011, titled What if the Astronauts are Lying?. The official release party was held at The Opera House. The first single from the album was "1623" and a music video was released via the band's website in August 2011. The entire album was given away for free via MuSwap.com; it was downloaded over 5000 times. Also, the band released over 5000 hard copies of the album to give to fans at shows.

== Discography ==
- This is the Sound (2007)
- It's DejaVu All over Again (EP, 2009)
- What if the Astronauts Are Lying (2011)
