= List of Billboard Mainstream Top 40 number-one songs of 2009 =

This is a list of songs which reached number one on the Billboard Mainstream Top 40 (or Pop Songs) chart in 2009.

During 2009, a total of 20 singles hit number-one on the charts.

== Chart history ==
Issue date	Song	Artist(s)	Ref.
January 3	"Womanizer"	Britney Spears	
January 10	"Live Your Life"	T.I. featuring Rihanna	
January 17	"Womanizer"	Britney Spears	
January 24	"Just Dance"	Lady Gaga featuring Colby O'Donis	
January 31	"Just Dance"	Lady Gaga featuring Colby O'Donis	
February 7	"Single Ladies (Put a Ring on It)"	Beyoncé	
February 14	"Single Ladies (Put a Ring on It)"	Beyoncé	
February 21	"Single Ladies (Put a Ring on It)"	Beyoncé	
February 28	"Love Story"	Taylor Swift	
March 7	"Circus"	Britney Spears	
March 14	"Gives You Hell"	The All-American Rejects	
March 21	"Gives You Hell"	The All-American Rejects	
March 28	"Gives You Hell"	The All-American Rejects	
April 4	"Gives You Hell"	The All-American Rejects	
April 11	"Right Round"	Flo Rida featuring Ke$ha	
April 18	"Right Round"	Flo Rida featuring Ke$ha	
April 25	"Poker Face"	Lady Gaga	
May 2	"Poker Face"	Lady Gaga	
May 9	"Poker Face"	Lady Gaga	
May 16	"Poker Face"	Lady Gaga	
May 23	"Poker Face"	Lady Gaga	
May 30	"Boom Boom Pow"	The Black Eyed Peas	
June 6	"Boom Boom Pow"	The Black Eyed Peas	
June 13	"Boom Boom Pow"	The Black Eyed Peas	
June 20	"Boom Boom Pow"	The Black Eyed Peas	
June 27	"Boom Boom Pow"	The Black Eyed Peas	
July 4	"Boom Boom Pow"	The Black Eyed Peas	
July 11	"Boom Boom Pow"	The Black Eyed Peas	
July 18	"Don't Trust Me"	3OH!3	
July 25	"LoveGame"	Lady Gaga	
August 1	"LoveGame"	Lady Gaga	
August 8	"Waking Up in Vegas"	Katy Perry	
August 15	"Waking Up in Vegas"	Katy Perry	
August 22	"I Gotta Feeling"	The Black Eyed Peas	
August 29	"I Gotta Feeling"	The Black Eyed Peas	
September 5	"I Gotta Feeling"	The Black Eyed Peas	
September 12	"I Gotta Feeling"	The Black Eyed Peas	
September 19	"I Gotta Feeling"	The Black Eyed Peas	
September 26	"I Gotta Feeling"	The Black Eyed Peas	
October 3	"I Gotta Feeling"	The Black Eyed Peas	
October 10	"Use Somebody"	Kings of Leon	
October 17	"Down"	Jay Sean featuring Lil Wayne	
October 24	"Down"	Jay Sean featuring Lil Wayne	
October 31	"Down"	Jay Sean featuring Lil Wayne	
November 7	"Party in the U.S.A."	Miley Cyrus	
November 14	"Paparazzi"	Lady Gaga	
November 21	"Paparazzi"	Lady Gaga	
November 28	"Whatcha Say"	Jason Derülo	
December 5	"Whatcha Say"	Jason Derülo	
December 12	"Whatcha Say"	Jason Derülo	
December 19	"Whatcha Say"	Jason Derülo	
December 26	"Replay"	Iyaz	

== See also ==
- 2009 in music
