= August Rigo =

- Born: Dan August Rigo; August 6, 1986 (age 39); Toronto, Ontario, Canada
- Genres: Pop; R&B
- Occupations: Songwriter; singer; record producer
- Years active: 2004–present
- Publishers: Alpine Music, Sony/ATV
- Website: augustrigo.com

Dan August Rigo (born August 6, 1986) is a Canadian songwriter, record producer and singer.

== Early life ==
Rigo was born on August 6, 1986, in Toronto. He became passionate about music when he watched Michael Jackson's performance of "Billie Jean" on Motown's 25th Anniversary TV Show. He taught himself to play keyboards and guitar while in his teens.

== Music career ==
He Co-wrote U Smile, "Stuck in the Moment" and "Kiss And Tell" for Justin Bieber, Solo for Iyaz and Outta this World for JLS. He is featured on Cheryl Cole's second album, Messy Little Raindrops, on the song Better To Lie. He is the executive producer of Musiq Soulchild's 2011 release of "musiqinthemagiq" and co-wrote "Anything", "SayIDo", "Silver & Gold", "WaitingStill" and "BackToWhere".

In 2010, August secured a publishing deal with Sony/ATV as well as an admin society deal with BMI. He is also signed with Island Def Jam Records.

In October 2011, August released his first single "Here Comes Trouble" featuring Busta Rhymes on Alpine Music Group/Island DefJam. He also released his promo mixtape "Too Big To Fail" online.

Rigo produced and featured on YouTube rapper D-Pryde's mixtapes "Once Again" (2012) and "Mars" (2011), as well as D-Pryde's first EP Canal&Richvale (2013)

On September 18, 2015, August Rigo released the Japanese version of his album "The Fall Out" on Manhattan Records in Japan. "The Fall Out" was released independently on Rigo's label "Summerchild Records" in Canada on November 6, 2015. The album was nominated for a Juno Award for Best R&B/Soul Recording.

In 2024 Rigo composed music for the television series Gangnam Project.

== Discography ==
=== Singles written ===
- 2010: "Solo" (Iyaz)
- 2010: "Change Positions" (Pleasure P)
- 2010: "Up & Running" (Jessica Jarrell)
- 2011: "Gotta Be You" (One Direction)
- 2011: "Party All Night (Sleep All Day)" (Sean Kingston)
- 2011: "Anything" (Musiq Soulchild)
- 2015: "Back To Sleep" (Chris Brown)
- 2017: "Back 2 U (AM 1:27)" (NCT 127)
- 2018: "1,2,3" (NCT Dream)
- 2019: "Betcha" (Baekhyun)
- 2020: "Black Swan" (BTS)
- 2020: "On" (BTS)
- 2021: "Anticipation" (Leanne and Naara)
- 2022: "Hot" (Seventeen)
- 2022: "Flying High" (JKT48)
- 2023: "Super" (Seventeen)
- 2023: "I Want You" (SB19)
- 2023: "Real Life" (NCT 127)
- 2025: "Shooting for the Stars" (SB19)

=== Songs written ===
- 2010

Justin Bieber – My World 2.0

- 3. "Stuck in the Moment"
- 4. "U Smile"
- 11. "Kiss and Tell" (iTunes bonus track)"

Iyaz – Replay

  - 2. "Solo"

JLS – Outta This World

- 3. "Outta This World"
- 5. "Work"
- 6. "I Know What She Like"
- 11. "Love at War"

Girlicious – Rebuilt

- 5. "Unlearn Me"
- 9. "Over You

Cheryl Cole – Messy Little Raindrops

- 9. "Better to Lie"

D-Pryde - "MARS"

- 13. '"Big Shot"
- 2011

Mindless Behavior – Number 1 Girl

- 3. "Future"

Musiq Soulchild – MusiqInTheMagiq

- 1. "Anything"
- 3. "Sayido"
- 5. "Silver&Gold"
- 6. "WaitingStill"
- 7. "Backtowhere"
- 13. "Clumsylove" (iTunes bonus track)
- 2014

Jesse McCartney – Have It All

- 3. "The Writer"
- 2015

Chris Brown – Royalty

- 1. "Back To Sleep"
- 2017

Kehlani - SweetSexySavage

- 2. Keep On
- 2017

Chris Brown - Heartbreak on a Full Moon

- 27. Tough Love
