= Mike Beatz =

Jamaican musician (born 1988)

Third World Don
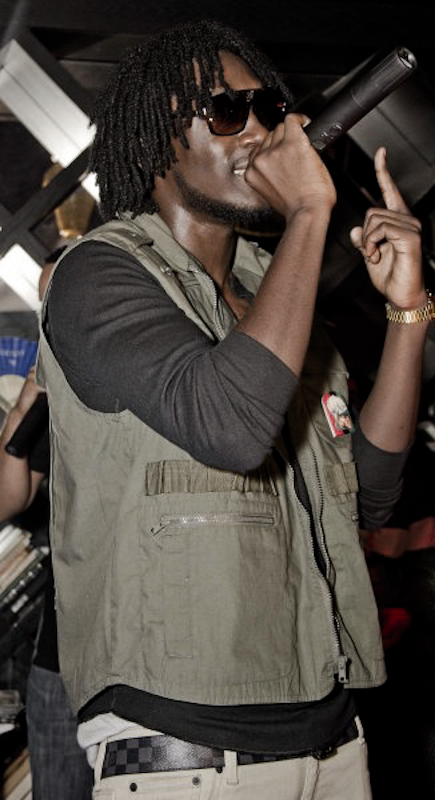
- Mike Beatz in 2011

Background information
- Also known as: Third World Don
- Born: Michael Anthony Barnett; 5 December 1988 (age 37); St. Mary, Jamaica
- Origin: Kingston, Jamaica
- Genres: Hip hop; reggae
- Occupations: Rapper; singer; songwriter; record producer
- Instruments: Vocals, sampler, keyboards
- Years active: 2006–present
- Label: UMG
- Website: www.thrdwrldgvng.com

Michael Anthony Barnett (born 5 December 1988), also known as Third World Don or Mike Beatz, is a Jamaican rapper, singer and record producer from Kingston, Jamaica. His production resume includes notable hip hop acts such as T-Pain, Trina, C-Rayz Walz & East Coast duo C-N-N.

He is a member of the Miami group Wizard Sleeve, most known for their hit single "Riverside (Let's Go!)", released by Data Records in 2010. The single entered the charts at No. 2 in the UK & Ireland and is noted as one of BBC Radio 1's top 40 singles of that era, with over 23 Million streams on the digital platform Spotify.

In 2011, he released the solo project "Boom Bap", produced entirely by Norwegian beat-maker Adonis. The 10-track EP features guest appearances from Guilty Simpson, Royce da 5'9", AZ, Termanology, Skyzoo, Sha Stimuli, Reks, and ¡Mayday! frontman Wrekonize. Don has also worked with US rappers Saigon, Sean Price, and Cappadonna from Wu-Tang Clan.

After Relocating to Los Angeles in 2017, Third World Don inked a recording contract with Strainge Entertainment, a label owned by Elliot Grainge, son of billionaire music mogul and Universal Music Group’s chairman and chief executive officer Lucian Grainge. He then released his single "Ray Charles" to much critical acclaim, amassing over 1.3 Million streams on SoundCloud alone. The song is also featured on Universal Music Group’s curated Hip Hop Alternative compilation album. Pharrell Williams, Logic, Ty Dolla $ign, Big Sean and Chance The Rapper are also featured on this compilation.

Grainge, looking to expand his reach even further, signed newcomers Trippie Redd and Tekashi 6ix9ine, adding them to the label's roster, which was subsequently shut down when Grainge was sued by Kansas City rapper Tech N9ne for trademark infringement. The 24-page lawsuit accused Grainge of violating his label Strange Music’s intellectual property rights by adapting the name Strainge, which he claimed was confusing and misleading to fans. After a lengthy court battle, Grainge sent out a press release stating he would no longer be using the name Strainge, instead operating under his new imprint called 10K Projects.

== Discography ==
=== Mixtapes ===
- 2007: Major League Presents: The Grand Larceny Mixtape – Hosted by Dj EFN & N.O.R.E (As a member of the group Major League)
- 2009: Akademiks Presents: Monsters Ink – Ink Made Me A Monster (As a member of the group Monsters Ink) 2009
- 2010: UTLM Music Group Present: The Termination Mixtape – Hosted By Dj Young Cee
- 2010: Wizard Sleeve – Gangsta Bass in the Magic City (As a member of the group Wizard Sleeve)
- 2011: Wizard Sleeve – Gangsta Bass in the Big Smoke (As a member of the group Wizard Sleeve)
- 2012: Wizard Sleeve – Gangsta Bass in Ibiza (As a member of the group Wizard Sleeve)

=== Albums ===
- 2011: Mike Beatz & Adonis Present: Boom Bap
- 2013: Third World American Dream
- 2014: Califoreigner
- 2016: Third World Don
- 2018: Trenchtown
- TBA: Trouble In Paradise
