= MTV Video Music Award Japan for Best Reggae Video =

Annual Japanese music award

Best Reggae Video (最優秀レゲエビデオ賞)

== Results ==
The following table displays the nominees and the winners in bold print with a yellow background.

=== 2000s ===
Year	Artist	Video
**2006** (5th)	**Shōnan no Kaze**	**"Karasu" (カラス)**
**2006** (5th)	Daddy Yankee	"Gasolina"
**2006** (5th)	Fire Ball	"Kishitohishito" (キットヒット～踊るカルマン～)
**2006** (5th)	Jumbomaatch featuring Takafin, Boxer Kid and Mighty Jam Rock	"Brand New Style Hi-Fi"
**2006** (5th)	Sean Paul	"We Be Burnin'"
**2007** (6th)	**Shōnan no Kaze**	**"Junrenka" (湘南乃風)**
**2007** (6th)	Lily Allen	"Smile"
**2007** (6th)	Matisyahu	"King without a Crown"
**2007** (6th)	Ryo The Skywalker	"Harewataru Oka" (晴れわたる丘)
**2007** (6th)	Sean Paul	"Temperature"
**2008** (7th)	**Shōnan no Kaze**	**"Suirenka" (睡蓮花)**
**2008** (7th)	Fire Ball	"Place in your Heart"
**2008** (7th)	Sean Kingston	"Beautiful Girls"
**2008** (7th)	Mavado	"Dreaming"
**2008** (7th)	Pushim	"Hey Boy"
**2009** (8th)	**Han-Kun**	**"Hotter Than Hot"**
**2009** (8th)	Kardinal Offishall featuring Akon	"Dangerous"
**2009** (8th)	Mighty Jam Rock	"U.P. Star"
**2009** (8th)	Natty	"Cold Town"
**2009** (8th)	Ryo the Skywalker	"Ever Green"

=== 2010s ===
Year	Artist	Video
**2010** (9th)	**Han-Kun**	**"Keep it Blazing"**
**2010** (9th)	Sean Kingston	"Fire Burning"
**2010** (9th)	Sean Paul	"So Fine"
**2010** (9th)	Pushim	"My Endless Love"
**2010** (9th)	Ryo the Skywalker	"Kokoni Aru Ima wo Tomoni Aruki Dasou" (ここにある今を 共に歩き出そう)
**2011** (10th)	**Iyaz**	**"Replay"**
**2011** (10th)	Fire Ball	"Dreamer"
**2011** (10th)	Han-Kun	"Touch The Sky"
**2011** (10th)	Nas and Damian Marley	"As We Enter"
**2011** (10th)	Ryo the Skywalker	"Taiyou Ni Naritai Yo" (太陽になりたいよ)
**2012** (11th)	**Sean Paul**	**"She Doesn't Mind"**
**2012** (11th)	Arare	"Your Puzzle" (ユアパズル)
**2012** (11th)	Pushim	"Messenger"
**2012** (11th)	SuperHeavy	"Miracle Worker"
**2012** (11th)	The Heavymanners featuring Rumi	"Breath for Speaker"
**2013** (12th)	Han-Kun	"Road to Zion"
**2013** (12th)	lecca	"Clown Love"
**2013** (12th)	Pushim	"Setting Sun" (夕陽)
**2013** (12th)	Sean Kingston featuring T.I.	"Back 2 Life (Live It Up)"
**2013** (12th)	Sean Paul featuring lecca	"Dream Girl"
