= So Big (song) =

Single by Iyaz

from the album Replay
- Released: 21 June 2010
- Recorded: 2009
- Genre: Reggae fusion; R&B
- Length: 3:19 (album version)
- Label: T.I.M.E.; Beluga Heights; Asylum; Reprise; Warner Bros.; 4th Black Street Walls
- Songwriters: J. R. Rotem; Claude Kelly
- Producer: J. R. Rotem

Iyaz singles chronology
"Pyramid" (2010)	"So Big" (2010)	"Break My Bank" (2010)

Music video
- "So Big" on YouTube

"So Big" is a song performed by British Virgin Islands recording artist Iyaz. It is the third single released from his album titled Replay and follows his singles "Replay" and "Solo", both of which reached the top 3 of the UK Singles Chart. It released as an EP in the U.S. on 21 June 2010 with a single release in the UK on September 10, 2010. "So Big" is written and produced by J. R. Rotem. Claude Kelly is the additional co-writer and also provides vocal production.

== Music video ==
The music video for "So Big" premiered on Iyaz's MySpace page on 5 August 2010 where it has received over 82,000 views. On 11 August 2010 it was added to his official YouTube account where it has currently amassed over 53 million views. American actress Francia Raisa is featured in the video.

== Formats and track listings ==
UK digital single

1. "So Big" (Album Version) – 3:19

UK digital remix single

1. "So Big" – 3:19
2. "So Big" (Jupiter Ace Remix) – 4:53
3. "So Big" (BackBeet Remix Club 12) – 5:59
4. "So Big" (BackBeet Radio Edit) – 3:15
5. "So Big" (MoonRunners Remix) – 5:29

U.S. digital EP

1. "So Big" – 3:19
2. "Replay" (Donni Hotwheel Mixshow) – 5:22
3. "Look at Me Now" – 3:05
4. "Goodbye" – 3:22

== Chart performance ==
In August 2010, "So Big" debuted at number 54 on the UK Singles Chart at 54 and peaked at 40, failing to reflect the success of "Replay" and "Solo" and it did not chart on any Billboard chart.

Chart (2010)	Peak position
Ireland (IRMA)	46
UK Singles (OCC)	40
UK R&B Chart	11

== Release history ==
Region	Date	Format	Label
United States	21 June 2010	EP – Digital download	Interscope
United Kingdom	10 September 2010	Single – Digital download	Interscope
