= Pretty Girls (Iyaz song) =

Single by Iyaz featuring Travie McCoy
- Released: 24 June 2011
- Recorded: 2011
- Genre: Pop
- Length: 3:43
- Label: Reprise; Beluga Heights; Warner Bros.
- Songwriter(s): W. Jordan; Clemm Rishad; Marty James
- Producer(s): J.R. Rotem; W. Jordan

Iyaz singles chronology
"The Mack" (2011)	"Pretty Girls" (2011)	"My Heart Broke" (2011)

Travie McCoy singles chronology
"Higher" (2010)	"Pretty Girls" (2011)	"Love Me" (2012)

"Pretty Girls" is a song performed by British Virgin Islands recording artist Iyaz, released on 24 June 2011. The song features vocals from American rapper Travie McCoy. The song peaked at number 43 on the U.S. Billboard Hot 100.

== Music video ==
A music video to accompany the release of "Pretty Girls" was first released onto YouTube on 17 August 2011. Sean Kingston and Soulja Boy Tell 'Em make cameo appearances in the video.

== Remix ==
A remix features rappers Ludacris and Mario Winans.

== Track listing ==
US digital download

1. "Pretty Girls" (featuring Travie McCoy) – 3:43

== Charts ==
Chart (2011)	Peak position
US Billboard Hot 100	43
US Mainstream Top 40 (Billboard)	18

== Release history ==
Region	Date	Format	Label
United States	June 24, 2011	Digital download	Reprise Records
