= Replay (Iyaz album) =

Studio album by Iyaz
- Released: 4 June 2010
- Recorded: 2009–2010
- Genres: R&B; reggae; hip hop
- Length: 38:14
- Labels: Beluga Heights; T.I.M.E.; Reprise
- Producers: J. R. Rotem; Mynority; David D.A. Doman

Iyaz chronology
Replay (2010)	Aurora (2015)

Singles from Replay
- 1. "Replay" Released: 11 August 2009; 2. "Solo" Released: 8 February 2010; 3. "So Big" Released: 21 June 2010

Replay is the debut studio album by British Virgin Islands R&B recording artist Iyaz, released on 4 June 2010. The album was executively produced by Iyaz's label boss J. R. Rotem.

Originally to be titled My Life, Iyaz requested the album to be retitled and postponed, in order not to compete with The Ready Set's debut album I'm Alive, I'm Dreaming (2010), also produced by Rotem. The album's lead single "Replay" was released on 11 August 2009. The album's second single "Solo" was released on 8 February 2010. "So Big" was released as the album's third single on 21 June 2010.

== Track listing ==
All tracks are written by Iyaz and produced by J. R. Rotem. Others who worked on the songs are given below.

Replay track listing
No.	Title	Writer(s)	Producer(s)	Length
1.	"Replay"	Kisean Anderson; Theron Thomas; Timothy Thomas; J. R. Rotem; Jason Desrouleaux		3:04
2.	"Solo"	Rotem; August Rigo; Deseouleaux		3:14
3.	"So Big"			3:22
4.	"OK"			3:45
5.	"Breathe"	Rotem		3:40
6.	"Heartbeat"	Rotem; David Lewis Doman	J.R. Rotem; David D.A. Doman	3:23
7.	"There You Are"			3:37
8.	"Stacy"	Thomas; Thomas		4:04
9.	"Look at Me Now"	Rotem		3:05
10.	"Friend"	Dean Martin		3:41
11.	"Goodbye"	Mynority Jose Aguirre Lopez	Mynority	3:22

UK iTunes Store bonus track
No.	Title	Writer(s)	Length
12.	"Solo" (music video)	Rotem; Rigo	3:24

International digital edition bonus track
No.	Title	Writer(s)	Producer (s)	Length
12.	"Replay" (DJ Suketu's Call to Dhol mix)	Thomas; Thomas; Rotem; Desrouleaux	DJ Suketu	4:20

Japanese CD edition bonus tracks
No.	Title	Writer(s)	Producer (s)	Length
12.	"Replay" (remix; featuring Flo Rida)	Thomas; Thomas; Rotem; Desrouleaux; Tramar Dillard		3:01
13.	"Replay" (Donni Hotwheel club mix)	Thomas; Thomas; Rotem; Desrouleaux	Donni Hotwheel	3:15
14.	"Replay" (Jason Nevins club mix)	Thomas; Thomas; Rotem; Desrouleaux	Jason Nevins	3:47
15.	"Replay" (Ruff Loaderz club mix)	Thomas; Thomas; Rotem; Desrouleaux	Ruff Loaderz	6:26
16.	"Solo" (Cahill radio mix)	Rotem; Rigo	Cahill	3:34
17.	"Solo" (Dave Audé radio mix)	Rotem; Rigo	Dave Audé	3:59

== Charts ==
Chart performance for Replay
Chart (2010)	Peak position
Belgian Albums (Ultratop Flanders)	68
Dutch Albums (Album Top 100)	61
Greek Albums (IFPI Greece)	18
Japanese Albums (Oricon)	22
Swiss Albums (Schweizer Hitparade)	35
UK Albums (Official Charts)	26
UK R&B Albums (Official Charts)	8

== Certifications ==
Certifications for Replay
Region	Certification	Certified units/sales
New Zealand (RMNZ)	Platinum	15,000^{‡}
^{‡} Sales+streaming figures based on certification alone.

== Release history ==
List of release dates, record label and format details
Country	Date	Label
Ireland	4 June 2010	Beluga Heights; Reprise
United Kingdom	7 June 2010	Beluga Heights; Reprise
United States	8 June 2010	Beluga Heights; Reprise
Japan	9 June 2010	Beluga Heights; Reprise
Brazil	19 July 2010	Beluga Heights; Warner Bros.
