= DJ Kiss =

- Origin: New York City, New York, United States
- Occupation(s): DJ, music producer, performer, model
- Years active: 2007-present
- Website: www.kissthedeejay.com

Jakissa Taylor Semple, known by the performing name DJ Kiss, is an American DJ, television personality, and fashion model. Born in Louisiana, she currently resides in New York City.

== Career ==
DJ Kiss has appeared in campaigns for the NFL, NARS Cosmetics, Nordstrom, and Farfetch.

She regularly deejays for a bevy of celebrities, corporations and high-fashion brands such as Prince, P. Diddy, Pharrell, Matt Damon, George Lucas, Alexander Wang, Coach, Ferragamo, Tiffany & Co., Diane Von Fostenberg, Beats by Dre, MTV, and NBC.

In 2014, DJ Kiss joined Oprah Winfrey on her 8-city "The Life That You Want" Tour.

DJ Kiss frequently appears Good Morning America as the Special Guest DJ. She was also featured as the music correspondent on VH1's Big Morning Buzz and MTV's “The Seven”."

In 2016, DJ Kiss, along with her husband DJ M.O.S., deejayed the 88th Academy Awards Governors Ball.
