= Solo (Iyaz song) =

2010 single by Iyaz

Single by Iyaz

from the album Replay
- Released: 8 February 2010 (U.S.); 24 May 2010 (UK)
- Recorded: 2009
- Genre: Pop; reggae pop; dancehall; R&B; hip-hop; electronic dance
- Length: 3:14 (album version); 3:37 (single version)
- Label: Konvict; Reprise; Warner; Universal; Atlantic; Cherrytree
- Songwriters: Keidran Jones; Aliaune Thiam; Ester Dean; Claude Kelly; Micheal Stevenson; The Runners
- Producers: Akon; JR Rotem; The Runners; Ester Dean; Claude Kelly; Mike Stevenson

Iyaz singles chronology
"Replay" (2009)	"Solo" (2010)	"Pyramid" (2010)

Audio sample
- file; help

Music video
- "Solo" on YouTube

"Solo" is a song by British Virgin Islands singer Iyaz, released by Beluga Heights Records on 8 June 2010 as the second single from his debut studio album, Replay (2010). It was produced by J. R. Rotem, who co-wrote the song alongside Iyaz, Jason Derulo, and August Rigo. It was released for digital download on 9 February 2010, became available for mainstream radio on 8 February 2010, and was released in the UK on 23 May 2010. The song samples Janet Jackson's 1993 single "Again"; its co-writers (Janet Jackson, Jimmy Jam and Terry Lewis) each share writing credits.

== Critical reception ==
Leah Greenblatt of Entertainment Weekly gave a review noting that the song contains samples of Janet Jackson's song "Again".

Robert Copsey of Digital Spy gave the song a positive review stating:

Following up his No.1 debut 'Replay', newcomer Keidran 'Iyaz' Jones launches a second assault on the charts with 'Solo'. However, this time his problems go deeper than a dodgy iPod – the Caribbean crooner's been ditched by his missus for reasons completely unknown to him. This, we presume, is almost as annoying as trying to work out where the niggling sample on the chorus comes from.

Of course, we didn't use Google to discover that it's actually the melody from Janet Jackson's 'Again' to which Iyaz laments: "I don't want to walk this earth if I gotta do it solo." J R Rotem is once again on production duties, and his trademark triple siren effect is sure to keep you awake on what is otherwise a thoroughly inoffensive – if perfectly pleasant – slice of summer reggae-pop. The hook may not be as infectious as 'Replay', but at the end of the day, who are we to turn down a bit of Janet?.

== Music video ==
The music video was released to MySpace on 7 April 2010, and has over 30 million views on YouTube.

The official music video for "Solo" was shot in Tortola, British Virgin Islands (Iyaz's hometown). Directed by Kai Crawford, it shows him walking around the neighborhoods of Tortola longing to find his lover. He is seen performing the song on cliffs overlooking the ocean, in a town, and on a beach, all looking very lonely and depressed. Black-and-white scenes also feature him and his girl recording the song in a studio. Every time he sees her, she disappears from his memory. Other scenes feature the pair as kids playing basketball together (a spot he eventually reaches and throws the ball alone in disbelief, missing his shot). He eventually finds her on a rock at a beach, and she accepts him back. It ends with the pair walking down the beach together again.

== Formats and track listings ==
Australian digital download

1. "Solo" – 3:14

UK digital EP

1. "Solo" (Album Version) – 3:14
2. "Solo" (Instrumental Version) – 3:14
3. "Solo" (A Cappella Version) – 3:14
4. "Solo" (Cahill Radio Mix) – 3:34
5. "Solo" (Dave Audé Radio Mix) – 3:59

=== Other versions ===
- "Solo" (Single version) – 3:25
- "Solo" (Cahill Mixshow) – 5:08
- "Solo" (Dave Aude Club Mix) – 9:05

== Chart performance ==
On 18 February 2010, "Solo" debuted at #43 on the Billboard Hot 100 Chart. After its debut it fell to #72, but rebounded to #32. This is Iyaz's second Top 40 hit, following the success of previous single "Replay". On 30 May 2010, "Solo" entered both the UK Singles Chart and the UK R&B Chart at number 3, marking Iyaz's second consecutive top three single on both charts. In it second week on the chart, "Solo" fell to number 10, marking its second week within the Top 10. On 13 June 2010, the single fell 10 places to number 20. The single also debuted on the Irish Singles Chart on 28 May 2010 at number 26, before falling to number 38 on its second week in the chart. On 11 June 2010, the single climbed 6 places to number 32.

== Charts and certifications ==
=== Weekly charts ===
Chart (2010)	Peak position
Australia (ARIA)	48
Austria (Ö3 Austria Top 40)	28
Belgium (Ultratip Bubbling Under Flanders)	4
Canada Hot 100 (Billboard)	54
Czech Republic Airplay (ČNS IFPI)	61
Euro Digital Song Sales (Billboard)	8
Euro Digital Tracks (Billboard); Album version	7
Germany (GfK)	25
Ireland (IRMA)	26
Netherlands (Dutch Top 40)	20
New Zealand (Recorded Music NZ)	35
UK Singles (Official Charts)	3
UK Hip Hop/R&B (Official Charts)	3
US Billboard Hot 100	32
US Pop Airplay (Billboard)	19

=== Certifications ===
Region	Certification	Certified units/sales
United Kingdom (BPI)	Silver	200,000^{‡}
United States (RIAA)	Gold	500,000^{*}
^{*} Sales figures based on certification alone.^{‡} Sales+streaming figures based on certification alone.

== Release history ==
Release dates and formats for "Solo"
Region	Date	Format	Label(s)	Ref.
United States	February 8, 2010	Mainstream airplay	Reprise	
