= Best Behaviour (N-Dubz song) =

2010 single by N-Dubz

Single by N-Dubz

from the album Love.Live.Life
- Released: 17 October 2010
- Recorded: 2010
- Genre: Hip hop; R&B
- Length: 3:59
- Label: All Around the World
- Songwriters: Costadinos Contostavlos; Tula Contostavlos; Richard Rawson; Benjamin McIldowie
- Producers: Richard Rawson; Costadinos Contostavlos; Benjamin McIldowie

N-Dubz singles chronology
| "We Dance On" (2010) | "Best Behaviour" (2010) | "Girls" (2010) |

"Best Behaviour" is a song by British hip hop group N-Dubz. The song was produced by Dino Contostavlos, Richard Rawson and Mr Hudson and co-written by Tula Contostavlos, Dappy, Fazer, and Mr Hudson. It was released on 17 October 2010 as the second single from N-Dubz's third studio album, Love.Live.Life. Musically, the song is a R&B ballad with prominent British hip hop characteristics. The initial writing consisted of the group being inspired to pen a song for their launch in the United States in addition to Dappy's feelings for his girlfriend, Kaye Vassell. It was inspired by the group's touring lifestyle and their enthusiastic fans. Lyrically, it is about trading one-night stands with people in favour of real love.

The song received moderately positive reviews from contemporary music critics who praised the song's cute chorus and N-Dubz's change in lyrical tone. It achieved commercial success by becoming the group's third top ten hit in both the United Kingdom and Scotland where it peaked at number ten in addition to garnering N-Dubz's fourth top forty hit in Ireland where it reached a chart position of number thirty-two. The accompanying music video for the song was directed by Ben Peters and was released on 8 September 2010. The bling-inspired video features the group disembarking a private jet, singing at a villa situated in Provence, France and on a yacht moored off St. Tropez. N-Dubz have performed the song at the 2010 MOBO Awards and on various television programmes and concerts including Daybreak and the Orange RockCorps Concert.

== Background ==
Following N-Dubz's signing with hip hop label Def Jam Recordings in the United States, the group penned "Best Behaviour" especially for their stateside launch. It was written by N-Dubz in collaboration with Mr Hudson, and produced by Fazer and Dappy. The group had previously collaborated with Mr Hudson on their single "Playing with Fire" which won them a MOBO Award for 'Best Song'. During the recording of the song, a snippet was played during the second episode of Being... N-Dubz. A live performance of the song was then shown on the fifth episode of the show. On 1 September 2010, N-Dubz announced that they had a new single, entitled "Best Behaviour" and that it will be released on 3 October 2010. The radio edit of the song premiered on BBC Radio 1Xtra and BBC Radio 1 on 5 September 2010. The release date was later pushed back to 17 October 2010. On 25 September 2010, the single was made available for pre-order.

Fans originally thought the song was titled "Love Is All I Need" before being corrected by N-Dubz themselves who clarified that the track is actually called "Best Behaviour". Tulisa originally stated that the song was the title track for their third studio album. The album, however, was later titled Love.Live.Life. Dappy revealed that the lyrics "Gonna be on my best behaviour," and "How long before you save me baby" on the song were written with his girlfriend, Kaye Vassell, in mind.

== Reception ==
=== Critical reception ===
Professional ratings
Review scores
| Source | Rating |
|---|---|
| Digital Spy | 3/5 stars |
| BBC Chart Blog | 3/5 stars |

Robert Copsey from Digital Spy felt that "Best Behaviour" was not as infectious as its predecessor, "We Dance On". Copsey, on the contrary, said that the "relatively wholesome offering" was just what was needed to keep the N-Dubz revolution on track. The song was awarded with a three out of five star rating by Fraser McAlpine of the BBC Chart Blog who said that it was: "Kind of boomy and big in a way which perhaps it doesn't need to be, as if straining for anthem status, when it's actually quite a quiet, thoughtful thing by N-Dubz's usual insane standards. But it hangs together in an agreeable fashion and the chorus is cute." McAlpine deemed the song as quite nice but lacking a brush-up lyrically.

=== Chart performance ===
In the United Kingdom, following the release of "Best Behaviour" on 17 October 2010, it was revealed that the single was at a midweek position of number six. It then slipped to a position of number ten by for the week ending 30 October 2010. It became N-Dubz's third top ten hit on the UK Singles Chart as solo artists and has since spent three consecutive weeks within the chart's top forty. Elsewhere, the single has peaked at number thirty-two in Ireland.

== Music video ==
The video was filmed on 1 September 2010 with British music video producer Ben Peters in Provence, France. Peters stated that the main story behind the video was bling. It was shot under a large budget of £75, 000, with sixteen-hour days over two days spent filming scenes at a number of locations, including: Le Castellet International Airport, a hillside villa and a yacht moored off St. Tropez. On set photographs from the shoot were then released via the group's Twitter on 3 September. The video premiered on British music television channels on 8 September 2010. An extended version of the video was later released.

From left to right: Fazer, Tulisa and Dappy exiting a private jet with Louis Vuitton luggage in the extended version of the music video for "Best Behaviour".

The music video portrays how the group has been squashed flat by a touring lifestyle. It illustrates the group looking so battered that they are not sure which way is up. The video involves a mournful disembarking from a private jet, lonely clattering around a house in the hills of Provence and wielding of Louis Vuitton luggage. In one scene, Dappy sings "When you gonna save me, baby?" while spreading his arms out wide and then crossing them over his chest. His on-screen love interest then dives into a swimming pool behind him and attempts to reach him through an aquarium-like diving glass wall.

Dappy is seen wearing shorts, a vest, a high-school letterman-like jacket and shoes with no socks. His looks aims to portray a man sorely in need of someone in his life. Fazer has a dark ensemble on with a silk scarf hanging from his belt. With regard to the men in the group sharpening up their image, Fazer stated that their new look substantiates how he and Dappy are "trying to grow up" and shed their previous image of a tracksuit-wearing group of grime-pop rebels. Fraser McAlpine of the BBC Chart Blog positively reviewed the "glamorous" video saying he felt it was impressive how Peters used clothing to capture Dappy's fragile mental state.

== Track listing ==
Digital download
| No. | Title | Length |
|---|---|---|
| 1. | "Best Behavior" (Radio Edit) | 3:29 |
| 2. | "Best Behavior" (Album Version) | 3:59 |
| 3. | "Best Behavior" (Teddy Mix) | 4:16 |
| 4. | "Best Behavior" (Christian Davies Remix) | 6:45 |
| 5. | "Best Behavior" (Jorg Schmid Remix) | 6:11 |
| Total length: | | 24:42 |

CD single
| No. | Title | Length |
|---|---|---|
| 1. | "Best Behavior" (Album Version) | 3:59 |
| 2. | "Best Behavior" (Teddy Mix) | 4:16 |
| Total length: | | 8:15 |

== Charts ==
| Chart (2010) | Peak position |
|---|---|
| Ireland (IRMA) | 32 |
| Scotland Singles (OCC) | 10 |
| UK Singles (OCC) | 10 |

== Certifications ==
| Region | Certification | Certified units/sales |
|---|---|---|
| United Kingdom (BPI) | Gold | 400,000^{‡} |
^{‡} Sales+streaming figures based on certification alone.

== Release history ==
| Region | Date | Format | Label |
|---|---|---|---|
| Ireland | 17 October 2010 | Digital download | All Around the World |
| United Kingdom | 17 October 2010 | Digital download | All Around the World |
| United Kingdom | 20 October 2010 | CD single | All Around the World |
