= Shout (Shout for England song) =

Single by Shout for England featuring Dizzee Rascal and James Corden
- Released: 9 June 2010
- Recorded: 2010
- Genre: Grime; pop-rap
- Length: 3:22
- Label: Syco
- Songwriters: Owen Ryan; Ian Stanley; Bill Withers; Teddy Riley; Richard Vick; William Stewart; Chauncey Hannibal; Lynise Walters; Dylan Mills; Ray Hedges; Nigel Butler; Blair Dreelan
- Producers: Ray Hedges; Nick Detnon; Nigel Butler

Dizzee Rascal singles chronology
"Dirtee Disco" (2010)	"Shout" (2010)	"Loca" (2010)

James Corden singles chronology
"Shout" (2010)	"Only You" (2015)

"Shout" is 2010 single by Shout for England, an ensemble featuring Dizzee Rascal and James Corden. It was an unofficial anthem of the England football team for the 2010 FIFA World Cup in South Africa. The song contains extracts from the Tears for Fears song of the same name and "No Diggity" by Blackstreet and features additional lyrics written by Rascal. It was published by Syco Music in association with the telecommunications company TalkTalk.

== Live performances & "Shout 2012" ==
"Shout" was first performed on the Series 4 finale of Britain's Got Talent on 5 June 2010 and at the Summertime Ball at Wembley Stadium the following day, ahead of its download release on 9 June. The CD single was released on 16 June. An updated version of the track was released for the UEFA Euro 2012 on 20 June 2012. It included references to England players such as Wayne Rooney and Ashley Cole.

== Chart performance ==
"Shout" debuted at number 1 on the UK Singles Chart on 13 June 2010, based on download sales alone, beating competition from "Frisky" by Tinie Tempah and fellow World Cup song "Wavin' Flag (The Celebration Mix)" by K'naan. It sold well over 100,000 copies in its first chart week despite only being available for four days (its download was released on Wednesday, and the UK chart surveys from Sunday to Saturday). All royalties from the single went to Great Ormond Street Hospital. On 17 June, it entered the Irish Singles Chart at No. 41. The song spent a second week atop the chart on 20 June. The song was knocked off the top spot by Katy Perry's "California Gurls" on 27 June. A remix of the song was released on 20 June 2012 for the Euros 2012 and peaked at number 43 on the UK iTunes chart.

Chart	Peak Position
Scotland Singles (OCC)	6
UK Singles (OCC)	1

=== Year-end charts ===
Chart (2010)	Position
UK Singles (OCC)	65
