= Riverside (song) =

Single by Sidney Samson
- B-side: "Just Shake"
- Released: 18 February 2009
- Genre: Dutch house
- Length: 3:24; 5:21 (original mix)
- Label: Sneakerz Muzik; Data Records
- Composer: Sidney Samson
- Lyricists: A.B. Abdelouahid; J. van Doeselaar; Robert Burian; Sidney Samson; T.B. Smulders
- Producer: Sidney Samson

Sidney Samson singles chronology
"Shut Up & Let It Go" (2009)	"Riverside" (2009)	"Get On The Floor" (2009)

Remix cover

"Riverside" is a house song released by Dutch DJ Sidney Samson. It was released on February 18, 2009 by Sneakerz Muzik and Data Records as a single. The "Riverside, motherfucker!" proclamation is the voice of the American rapper Tupac Shakur sampled from the American film Juice. The song is often censored during prime time, to avoid causing offence.

A vocal mix featuring American rap group Wizard Sleeve, retitled "Riverside (Let's Go!)", was released in the UK on 4 January 2010. Many British radio stations, including BBC Radio 1, added "Riverside" to their playlists, and as such the single received a high amount of radio play throughout December 2009 and January 2010, in preparation for the single's release. The song entered the UK Singles Chart at No. 2 on 10 January 2010. It also featured in some episodes of Harry Hill's TV Burp, whenever Hill would dance around the stage.

In January 2018, Samson collaborated with Tujamo to release a new version of the song titled "Riverside (Reloaded)". Later in the same year, Samson also partnered with Oliver Heldens to release another remake titled "Riverside 2099".

== Music video ==
Released May 2009, the music video features two children who have been hired by 'The Godfather' to collect a package of lollipops from two women. After delivering the goods two lollipops short, 'The Godfather' chases the younger child through the streets, as one of the children sticks 'Riverside' stickers onto various items and eventually slaps a sticker on Sidney himself. The video ends with 'The Godfather' being hit by a Hummer H2. It was filmed on location in Arnhem, the Netherlands. This is visible as there is a fire hose marked 'brandslang' during the indoor chase scene, the cars have Dutch license plates and the clip shows a Dutch Police officer. Finally, at some point in the video clip, the chase takes place on the platform of train station Arnhem Presikhaaf. An additional music video has been made for the Wizard Sleeve version, which was directed by James Copeman. It features on screen painting of people and models walking with paintbrushes. Wizard Sleeve and Sidney Samson are seen holding pictures and then the camera goes into that picture to reveal the model walking with Sidney Samson rapping in a painting behind her. It later has scenes with him and another model rapping.

== Track listing ==
1. "Riverside" (Explicit Edit) – 3:24
2. "Riverside" (Afrojack Remix) – 5:31
3. "Riverside" (Warren Clarke Remix) – 6:54
4. "Riverside (Let's Go!)" (Dirty Extended Vocal Mix) – 5:09
5. "Riverside (Let's Go!)" (Breakage Remix) – 4:11

== Chart performance ==
=== Weekly charts ===
Chart (2009–2010)	Peak position
Original version
Australia (ARIA)	10
Austria (Ö3 Austria Top 40)	50
Belgium (Ultratop 50 Flanders)	13
Czech Republic Airplay (ČNS IFPI)	24
Denmark (Tracklisten)	40
Hungary (Dance Top 40)	1
Netherlands (Dutch Top 40)	14
Netherlands (Single Top 100)	8
2010 Remix featuring Wizard Sleeve
Ireland (IRMA)	2
Scottish Singles Chart	1
UK Singles (Official Charts)	2
UK Indie (Official Charts)	1

=== Year-end charts ===
Original version

Chart (2009)	Position
Australia (ARIA)	51
Belgium (Ultratop Flanders)	100
Hungary (Dance Top 40)	6
Netherlands (Dutch Top 40)	81
Netherlands (Single Top 100)	60

Chart (2010)	Position
Hungary (Dance Top 40)	34

Remix featuring Wizard Sleeve

Chart (2010)	Position
UK Singles (Official Charts Company)	38

== Certifications ==
Certifications for "Riverside"
Region	Certification	Certified units/sales
Australia (ARIA)	Gold	35,000^{^}
United Kingdom (BPI)	Gold	400,000^{^}
^{^} Shipments figures based on certification alone.

== Release history ==
Release history and formats for "Riverside"
Region	Date	Format	Label
Netherlands	18 February 2009	CD single	Sneakerz Muzik
Netherlands	6 March 2009	Radio Mix	Sneakerz Muzik
Netherlands	23 March 2009	Remixes	Sneakerz Muzik
Australia	15 May 2009	CD single	Neon Records
Australia	15 May 2009	Remixes	Neon Records
United Kingdom	3 January 2010	Digital download	Data Records
United Kingdom	3 January 2010	Remixes	Data Records
United Kingdom	4 January 2010	CD single	Data Records
