= Replay (Iyaz song) =

2009 song by Iyaz

Single by Iyaz

from the album Replay
- Released: July 7, 2009
- Recorded: 2008
- Genre: Pop; R&B; reggae; dancehall; hip-hop; electropop
- Length: 3:01
- Label: Reprise; Beluga Heights; Konvict; Warner; Cherrytree
- Songwriters: Kisean Anderson; Timothy Thomas; Theron Thomas; Jason Desrouleaux; Jonathan Rotem; Keidran Jones; Aliaune Thiam
- Producers: JR Rotem; Sean Kingston; Akon; Sak Pase

Iyaz singles chronology
"Replay" (2009)	"Solo" (2010)

Audio sample
- file; help

Music video
- "Replay" on YouTube

"Replay" is the debut single by British Virgin Islands singer Iyaz. It is the first single released from his debut album of the same name, which was released in 2009. The official remix features American rapper Flo Rida.

The single entered at the top of the UK Singles Chart, where it remained for two weeks until it was overtaken by "Fireflies" by Owl City. Internationally, the single also topped the charts in Australia, Israel and Switzerland and peaked within the top 10 of the charts in many countries, including Finland, France and the United States. The combined figure of the official music video and prequel video on YouTube is currently over 400+ million views.

== Background and composition ==
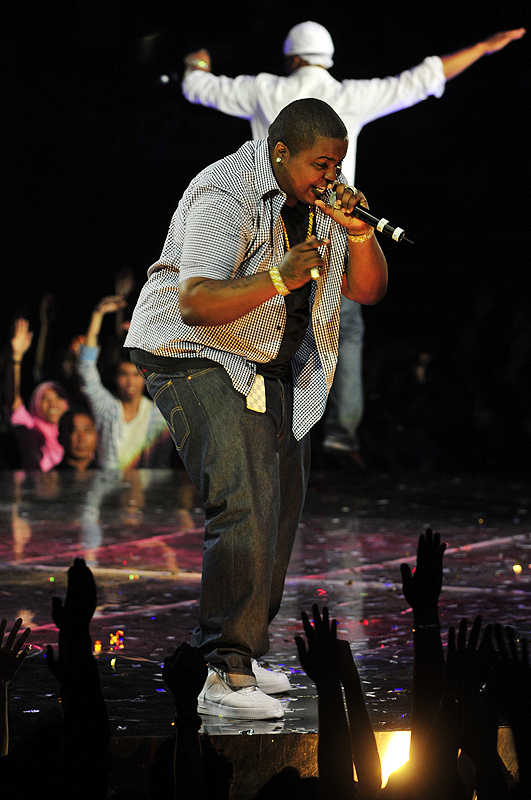
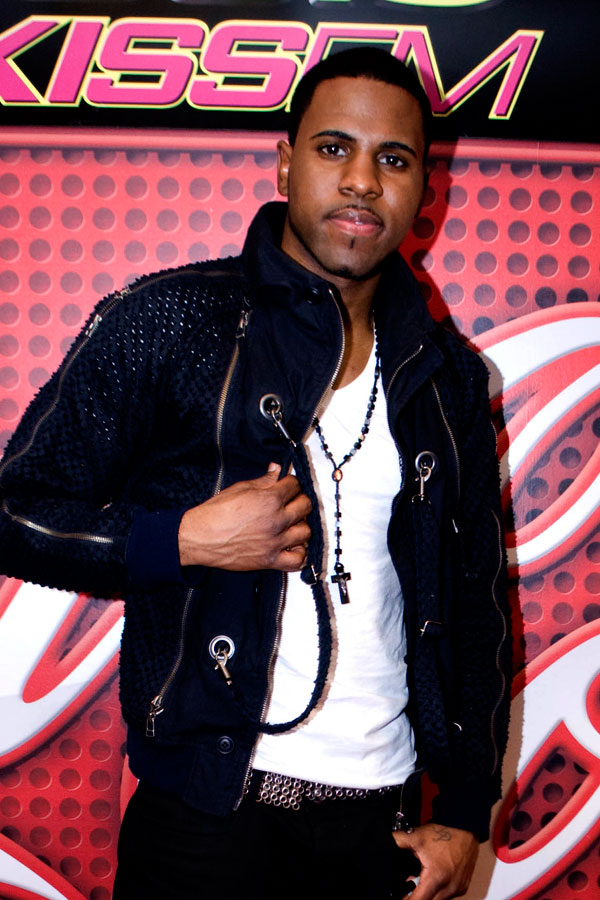
Iyaz co-wrote "Replay" with fellow singers and labelmates Sean Kingston (left) and Jason Derulo (right).

Beluga Heights labelmates Sean Kingston, Jason Derulo, co-wrote the song along with Iyaz, along with label owner J. R. Rotem and songwriting duo Planet VI (known as Rock City at the time). This was the second song that Derulo, Kingston and Rotem wrote together, the first being Derulo's own debut single, "Whatcha Say". Rotem also produced the track and credits himself at the beginning of the song via his signature "J-J-J-J-J.R." sample. The song was originally intended for Sean Kingston's album Tomorrow, but Kingston and his team rejected it.

Eleven years later, the song went viral online again in June 2020, sparking numerous memes. It is set in the key of F♯ minor, and has a tempo of 91.

== Chart performance ==
The song debuted in the UK at number one on 10 January 2010, selling over 106,000 copies in its first week, the highest sale for any new year release since Michelle McManus sold 118,000 copies of "All This Time" in the equivalent week in January 2004. After two weeks at number one on the UK Singles Chart and six weeks at the top of the UK R&B Chart, "Replay" was succeeded by Owl City's "Fireflies" and Rihanna's "Rude Boy", respectively. It was the first song released in 2010 in the UK to be certified Gold with sales in excess of 400,000. In June 2010, it was announced that "Replay" was the third highest selling single of the year in the UK at that point. It was also the first song to reach number one in the 2010s (not counting Lady Gaga's "Bad Romance" which also reached number one in 2009).

In the US, "Replay" managed to reach the number-two spot on the Hot 100 for one week, behind only Kesha's "Tik Tok". As of December 2012, Replay has sold over four million digital copies.

== Music video ==
The official music video features Iyaz wearing headphones and listening to music on a beach. Other various scenes feature Iyaz singing with a background of the British Virgin Islands' flag, and partying on the beach during the night. The video was directed by Rock Jacobs. A prequel video was also filmed, featuring the full-length beach scenes with Iyaz and his love interest, played by Panamanian model Estelita Quintero.

== Remixes ==
- "Replay" (official remix) (featuring Flo Rida)
- "Replay" (official remix #2) (featuring Sean Kingston, Nipsey Hussle, Bizzy Bone, and Rock City)
- "Replay" (DJ Suketu's Call to Dhol mix) (remixed by DJ Suketu featuring Sagar Dhote)

== Cultural impact ==
In 2017, Norwegian producer duo Davai released an EDM-inspired cover version, with new vocals by Cire. The song reached number 16 on the Norwegian Singles Chart. In 2022, the Italian rapper Shiva released the single "Pensando a lei", which contains a sample of Replay. In 2019–20, the song had gained traction as a meme as another form of rickrolling others in social settings and on the app TikTok.

== Charts ==
=== Weekly charts ===
2009–2010 weekly chart performance for "Replay"
Chart (2009–2010)	Peak position
Australia (ARIA)	1
Austria (Ö3 Austria Top 40)	3
Belgium (Ultratop 50 Flanders)	3
Belgian Airplay (Ultratop Flanders)	3
Belgium (Ultratop 50 Wallonia)	6
Canada Hot 100 (Billboard)	5
Czech Republic Airplay (ČNS IFPI)	4
Denmark (Tracklisten)	20
Euro Digital Song Sales (Billboard)	1
Euro Digital Tracks (Billboard) Album version	1
Finland (Suomen virallinen lista)	7
France (SNEP)	7
Germany (GfK)	7
Hungary (Rádiós Top 40)	28
Ireland (IRMA)	2
Israel International Airplay (Media Forest)	1
Italy (FIMI)	4
Netherlands (Dutch Top 40)	2
Netherlands (Single Top 100)	8
New Zealand (Recorded Music NZ)	2
Norway (VG-lista)	12
Romania Airplay (Media Forest)	3
Russia Airplay (TopHit)	29
Scottish Singles Sales (Official Charts)	1
Spain (Promusicae)	24
Sweden (Sverigetopplistan)	23
Switzerland (Schweizer Hitparade)	1
UK Singles (Official Charts)	1
US Billboard Hot 100	2
US Adult Pop Airplay (Billboard)	26
US Pop Airplay (Billboard)	1
US Rhythmic Airplay (Billboard)	1

2026 weekly chart performance for "Replay"
Chart (2026)	Peak position
Nigeria Bubbling Under Hot 100 (TurnTable)	8
Nigeria Airplay (TurnTable)	60

=== Year-end charts ===
2009 year-end chart performance for "Replay"
Chart (2009)	Position
US Billboard Hot 100	83

2010 year-end chart performance for "Replay"
Chart (2010)	Position
Australia (ARIA)	15
Austria (Ö3 Austria Top 40)	48
Belgium (Ultratop Flanders)	28
Belgium (Ultratop Wallonia)	35
Brazil (Crowley)	95
Canada (Canadian Hot 100)	32
European Hot 100 Singles	19
France (SNEP)	58
Germany (Official German Charts)	47
Italy (FIMI)	24
Italy Airplay (EarOne)	25
Netherlands (Dutch Top 40)	21
Netherlands (Single Top 100)	49
Romania (Romanian Top 100)	51
Russia Airplay (TopHit)	117
Switzerland (Schweizer Hitparade)	14
UK Singles (OCC)	18
US Billboard Hot 100	25
US Mainstream Top 40 (Billboard)	22
US Rhythmic (Billboard)	10

== Certifications ==
Certifications and sales for "Replay"
Region	Certification	Certified units/sales
Australia (ARIA)	3× Platinum	210,000^{^}
Austria (IFPI Austria)	Gold	15,000^{*}
Belgium (BRMA)	Gold	15,000^{*}
Denmark (IFPI Danmark)	2× Platinum	180,000^{‡}
France (SNEP)	Diamond	333,333^{‡}
Germany (BVMI)	2× Platinum	600,000^{‡}
Italy (FIMI)	Platinum	30,000^{*}
Japan (RIAJ) Digital single	Gold	100,000^{*}
New Zealand (RMNZ)	5× Platinum	150,000^{‡}
Spain (Promusicae)	Platinum	60,000^{‡}
United Kingdom (BPI)	3× Platinum	1,800,000^{‡}
United States (RIAA)	3× Platinum	3,000,000^{*}
^{*} Sales figures based on certification alone.^{^} Shipments figures based on certification alone.^{‡} Sales+streaming figures based on certification alone.

== Release history ==
Release dates and formats for "Replay"
Region	Date	Format	Label(s)	Ref.
United States	August 25, 2009	Contemporary hit radio	Reprise	

== See also ==
- List of Mainstream Top 40 number-one hits of 2009 (U.S.)
- List of number-one singles from the 2010s (UK)
- List of number-one R&B hits of 2010 (UK)
- List of number-one singles in Australia in 2010
- List of number-one hits of 2010 (Switzerland)
- List of Billboard Rhythmic number-one songs of the 2010s
