= Iyaz =

British Virgin Islands singer (born 1987)

- Born: Keidran Kenmore Jones; 15 April 1987 (age 39); Tortola, British Virgin Islands
- Genres: R&B; reggae; pop
- Occupations: Singer; songwriter
- Years active: 2008–present
- Labels: Time Is Money; Atlantic; Rekless/Warner Music; Warner Bros.; Reprise; Asylum (former)

Keidran Kenmore Jones (born 15 April 1987), better known by his stage name Iyaz (pronounced /ˈaɪjæz/ EYE-yaz), is a British Virgin Islands singer and songwriter, formerly signed with the record label Warner Music Group. He is known for his singles "Replay", "Solo", and "Pretty Girls". He released his debut album Replay in 2010.

== Life and career ==
=== 1987–2009: Early life and career beginnings ===
Keidran Jones, known by his stage name Iyaz, was born in 1987 into a musical family. He was born and raised on Tortola in the British Virgin Islands. Iyaz studied digital recording at New England Institute of Technology. He was featured on the track "Island Girls" by Out Da Box Family, which achieved radio success in the Caribbean. Brennan Sayre, an A&R consultant with 800 Agency & Beluga Heights, found Iyaz through his Myspace page in 2008 and sent his music to Tommy Rotem and Sean Kingston who would later sign him to a recording contract with Time Is Money/Beluga Heights. Kingston also introduced him to producer and Beluga Heights head J.R. Rotem.

=== 2009–present: Replay and Aurora ===
In 2009, he released "Replay" which peaked at number 2 on the Billboard Hot 100 and at number 1 in several territories, including the United Kingdom. His second single "Solo" was released in February 2010, and peaked at number 32 on the Hot 100. He also took part in recording the Haiti charity single, "We Are the World 25 for Haiti". His debut album, Replay, was released in 2010, and he was also featured on Jake Zyrus’s single "Pyramid". In an interview with HitQuarters, Rotem described Iyaz's creative perfectionism:

"Where as [sic] others might work on several songs in one day, he might sit there and work on one song for days. The end result that he gets is usually an absolute gem, so heartfelt and genuine."

Iyaz also appeared on the fourth season of Hannah Montana, Hannah Montana Forever and made a song with Miley Cyrus called "Gonna Get This", which is featured on the Hannah Montana Forever soundtrack album. In 2011, Iyaz played his part in Big Time Rush's song "If I Ruled the World". Iyaz released "Last Forever" with David Guetta as the producer, and its follow-up, "At Last". Iyaz was featured on New Boyz's single "Break My Bank" and Akon's "My Girl".

Later, Iyaz did a duet called "You're My Only Shorty" with Demi Lovato, which is from Lovato's third studio album, Unbroken. He released a song with Travie McCoy titled "Pretty Girls" and later in the year a song titled "My Heart Broke" surfaced. Iyaz uploaded a duet song named, "Christmas Time" featuring Sha Sha Jones on to YouTube, A Christmas song which his grandparents requested.

In 2013, a slew of tracks credited to Iyaz surfaced online, namely "Da Da Da", along with "Congrats", "What Is This Feeling" and "Too Sexy".

In 2014, after leaving his previous labels the year prior, Iyaz signed with new Los Angeles-based independent record label Rekless Music, which is distributed by the Alternative Distribution Alliance and Warner Music Group. Iyaz made a cover of Chris Brown's "Loyal" named "Comin' for Ya", followed by another cover months after of Magic!'s song "Rude", which he shared on SoundCloud. Iyaz tweeted in December 2014 he would release a single titled "One Million", and released a snippet of the song on SoundCloud. Iyaz released "One Million" on iTunes in Japan on 12 December 2014, the first single from his second album Aurora, released exclusively in Japan on 8 April 2015.

On 24 July 2015 Iyaz released the second single from Aurora, "Alive", featuring Nash Overstreet of Hot Chelle Rae. It was produced by J.D. "Boy Rekless" Salbego, the President/CEO of Rekless Music, Iyaz's new label, and Stuart Hart. On 23 September 2015, MTV exclusively premiered the official video of "Alive".

== Discography ==
=== Studio albums ===
List of albums, with selected chart positions
Title	Details	Peak chart positions				
Title	Details	UK	BEL	GRE	NLD	SWI
Replay	Released: 4 June 2010; Label: Beluga Heights, Reprise, Asylum; Formats: CD, digital download	26	68	18	61	35
Aurora	Released: 8 April 2015; Label: Rekless Music, ADA; Formats: CD, digital download	—	—	—	—	—

=== Extended plays ===
Title	Details	Peak chart positions
Title	Details	US Heat.
So Big	Released: 21 June 2010; Label: Interscope; Formats: Digital download	15

=== Singles ===
==== As lead artist ====
List of singles, with selected chart positions
Title	Year	Peak chart positions										Certifications	Album
Title	Year	UK	AUS	CAN	GER	IRE	NLD	NZ	NOR	SWI	US	Certifications	Album
"Replay"	2009	1	1	5	7	2	2	2	12	1	2	BPI: 2× Platinum; ARIA: 3× Platinum; BVMI: Platinum; RIAA: 4× Platinum; RMNZ: 5× Platinum	Replay
"Solo"	2010	3	48	54	25	26	20	35	—	—	32	BPI: Silver; RIAA: Gold; RMNZ: Gold	Replay
"We Are the World 25 for Haiti" (as part of Artists for Haiti)	2010	50	18	7	—	9	—	8	1	—	2		Non-album single
"So Big"	2010	40	—	—	—	46	—	—	—	—	—		Replay
"Look at Me Now"	2010	—	—	—	—	—	—	—	—	—	—		Replay
"Pretty Girls" (featuring Travie McCoy)	2011	—	—	—	—	—	—	—	—	—	43		Non-album single
"One Million"	2014	—	—	—	—	—	—	—	—	—	—		Aurora
"Alive" (featuring Nash Overstreet)	2015	—	—	—	—	—	—	—	—	—	—		Aurora
"One Puff" (with B-Case and Jowell & Randy)	2018	—	—	—	—	—	—	—	—	—	—		Non-album singles
"Destiny" (featuring Kabaka Pyramid)	2018	—	—	—	—	—	—	—	—	—	—		Non-album singles
"—" denotes a recording that did not chart or was not released in that territory.

==== As featured artist ====
Title	Year	Peak chart positions				Certifications	Album
Title	Year	UK	AUS	CAN	US	Certifications	Album
"Island Girls" (Out Da Box Family featuring Iyaz, Diction and Shotta)	2008	—	—	—	—		Non-album single
"Pyramid" (Charice featuring Iyaz)	2010	17	45	41	56		Charice
"La, La, La" (Auburn featuring Iyaz)	2010	—	—	—	51		Non-album single
"Break My Bank" (New Boyz featuring Iyaz)	2010	—	67	—	68		Too Cool to Care
"Gonna Get This" (Hannah Montana featuring Iyaz)	2010	—	75	—	66	RIAA: Gold	Hannah Montana Forever
"The Mack" (Mann featuring Iyaz and Snoop Dogg)	2011	28	68	—	—		Mann's World
"If I Ruled the World" (Big Time Rush featuring Iyaz)	2011	—	—	—	— (Note: "If I Ruled the World" did not enter the US Billboard Hot 100 but did peak at number 6 on the Bubbling Under Hot 100 extension chart.)		Elevate
"Fight for You" (Stevie Hoang featuring Iyaz)	2011	—	—	—	—		Unsigned
"Slow Motion" (Lee.M and J.Pearl featuring Iyaz and Snoop Dogg)	2012	—	—	—	—		Non-album singles
"Superhero" (DJ Kiss featuring Iyaz and Afrojack)	2016	—	—	—	—		Non-album singles
"—" denotes a recording that did not chart or was not released in that territory.

=== Other appearances ===
List of non-single guest appearances, showing year released and album name
Title	Year	Other artist(s)	Album
"Like This"	2010	Jessica Mauboy	Get 'Em Girls
"Slow Motion"	2010	Lil' Uno	Non-album single
"Runnin' Back"	2011	Mýa	K.I.S.S. (Keep It Sexy & Simple)
"You're My Only Shorty"	2011	Demi Lovato	Unbroken
"Bad Dream"	2017	Bone Thugs-n-Harmony	New Waves

== Awards and nominations ==
Year	Award show	Nomination	Result
2011	MTV Video Music Awards Japan	Best Reggae Video — "Replay"	Won
2011	BMI Awards	50 Most Performed Songs of the Year — "Replay"	Won
