= Mr Hudson discography =

- Studio albums: 2
- Singles: 15
- Music videos: 10

The discography of Mr Hudson, a British R&B and pop singer-songwriter, consists of two studio albums, 15 singles (including eight as a featured artist) and ten music videos. In 2009, he released his debut solo studio album, Straight No Chaser, which included his first top five single, "Supernova", which featured Kanye West and peaked at number two in the United Kingdom. Straight No Chaser went on to debut at number 25 on the UK Albums Chart.

== Studio albums ==
Title	Details	Peak chart positions
Title	Details	UK
Straight No Chaser	Released: 19 October 2009; Label: GOOD Music, Mercury; Formats: CD, digital download	25
When the Machine Stops	Released: 21 June 2019; Label: Mr Hudson; Formats: CD, digital download	—

== Singles ==
=== As lead artist ===
Title	Year	Peak chart positions				Album
Title	Year	UK	IRE	GER	US Bub.	Album
"Too Late Too Late"	2007	53	—	—	—	A Tale of Two Cities
"There Will Be Tears"	2008	—	—	—	—	Straight No Chaser
"Supernova" (featuring Kanye West)	2009	2	2	47	12	Straight No Chaser
"White Lies"	2009	20	—	—	—	Straight No Chaser
"Fred Astaire"	2013	—	—	—	—	Non-album singles
"Move"	2013	—	—	—	—	Non-album singles
"Step into the Shadows" (featuring Idris Elba)	2014	—	—	—	—	Non-album singles
"Dancing Thru It"	2015	—	—	—	—	Non-album singles
"Hey You"	2015	—	—	—	—	Non-album singles
"Can't Forgot You"	2017	—	—	—	—	Non-album singles
"Coldplay" (featuring Vic Mensa)	2017	—	—	—	—	Non-album singles
"Antidote"	2019	—	—	—	—	When the Machine Stops
"Chicago" (featuring Vic Mensa)	2019	—	—	—	—	When the Machine Stops
"—" denotes a recording that did not chart or was not released.

=== As featured artist ===
Title	Year	Peak chart positions										Certifications	Album
Title	Year	UK	AUS	BEL	FRA	IRE	NL	NZ	SWE	SWI	US	Certifications	Album
"Paranoid" (Kanye West featuring Mr Hudson)	2009	—	90	— (Note: "Paranoid" did not enter the Flemish Ultratop 50, but peaked at number 15 on the Ultratip chart.)	—	—	—	—	—	—	— (Note: "Paranoid" did not enter the Billboard Hot 100, but peaked at number 18 on the Bubbling Under Hot 100 Singles chart, which acts as an extension to the Hot 100.)	RIAA: Gold	808s & Heartbreak
"Young Forever" (Jay-Z featuring Mr Hudson)	2010	10	28	— (Note: "Young Forever" did not enter the Flemish Ultratop 50, but peaked at number 3 on the Ultratip chart.)	128	11	50	32	40	44	10	BPI: Platinum; RIAA: 3× Platinum; RMNZ: Gold	The Blueprint 3
"Playing with Fire" (N-Dubz featuring Mr Hudson)	2010	14	—	—	—	28	—	—	—	—	—	BPI: Platinum	Against All Odds
"Love Never Dies (Back for the First Time)" (Caspa featuring Mr Hudson)	2010	42	—	—	—	—	—	—	—	—	—		Non-album single
"Why I Love You" (Jay-Z & Kanye West featuring Mr Hudson)	2011	87	—	—	56	—	—	—	—	52	—	BPI: Silver; RMNZ: Gold	Watch the Throne
"Charge" (Sway featuring Mr Hudson)	2012	—	—	—	—	—	—	—	—	—	—		The Deliverance
"Battle" (Riddim Commission featuring Newham Generals and Mr Hudson)	2013	—	—	—	—	—	—	—	—	—	—		Riddim Commission, Vol. 1
"Real and True" (Future and Miley Cyrus featuring Mr Hudson)	2013	92	—	—	—	—	—	—	—	—	— (Note: "Real and True" did not enter the Billboard Hot 100, but peaked at number three on the Bubbling Under Hot 100 Singles chart, which acts as an extension to the Hot 100.)	RIAA: Gold	Non-album singles
"Warm Your Hands" (Paul Harris & Simon Duffy featuring Mr Hudson)	2015	—	—	—	—	—	—	—	—	—	—		Non-album singles
"21 & Jaded" (Goody Grace featuring Mr Hudson and Anthony Fantano)	2021	—	—	—	—	—	—	—	—	—	—		Don't Forget Where You Came From
"—" denotes a recording that did not chart or was not released.

== Guest appearances ==
List of non-single guest appearances, with other performing artists, showing year released and album name
Title	Year	Other performer(s)	Album
"Every Man (For Himself)"	2007	Sway	One for the Journey
"The Return (Here She Comes Again)"	2009	Malik Yusef	G.O.O.D. Morning, G.O.O.D. Night
"Angel Eyes"	2010	—N/a	—N/a
"Jaguar"	2011	Excision & Datsik	X Rated
"My Eyes"	2018	Lethal Bizzle	Best of Bizzle
"The Prize"	2012	Jakwob	The Prize
"Here Comes the Night"	2016	DJ Snake	Encore
"Almost There"	2017	Vic Mensa	The Manuscript
"Cold War"	2017	Bearson	Cold War – EP
"Cudi Montage"	2018	Kids See Ghosts	Kids See Ghosts
"Deserve It"	2018	Vic Mensa	Hooligans – EP
"I Miss You"	2019	Taylor Bennett	The American Reject

== Songwriting and production credits ==
Title	Year	Artist(s)	Album	Credits	Written with	Produced with
"Street Lights"	2008	Kanye West	808s & Heartbreak	Co-writer/Co-producer	Kanye West, Jenny-Bea Englishman, Antony Williams	Kanye West
"Heartless"	2009	The Fray	The Fray	Co-writer	Jeff Bhasker, Kanye West, Scott Mescudi, Ernest Wilson, Malik Yusef Jones	-
Best Behaviour	2010	N-Dubz	Love.Live.Life	Co-writer/Producer	Costadinos Contastavlos, Tula Contastavlos, Richard Rawson	Fazer
"Goldeneye"	2011	Frank Ocean	Nostalgia, Ultra	Co-writer/Producer	Christopher Breaux	-
"There Will Be Tears"	2011	Frank Ocean	Nostalgia, Ultra	Co-writer/Producer	Christopher Breaux	Troy Noka
"Come Get It Now"	2011	Pixie Lott	Young Foolish Happy	Co-writer/Producer	Victoria Lott, Catherine Dennis, Robin French	-
"Take Me"	2014	Paloma Faith	A Perfect Contradiction	Co-writer/Producer	Paloma Faith, John Stephens	-
"Hold On" (featuring Thabo & Groge the Poet)	2014	Idris Elba	Idris Elba presents Mi Mandela	Co-writer/Producer	Idrissa Elba, Michael Stafford, George Mpanga	Idris Elba
"Pressure Off" (featuring Janelle Monae & Nile Rodgers)	2015	Duran Duran	Paper Gods	Co-writer/Producer	John Taylor, Roger Taylor, Nicholas Rhodes, Simon le Bon, Nile Rodgers, Mark Ronson, Janelle Robinson	Duran Duran, Mark Ronson, Nile Rodgers, Josh Blair
"Paper Gods" (featuring Mr Hudson)	2015	Duran Duran	Paper Gods	Featured artist/Co-writer/Producer	John Taylor, Roger Taylor, Nicholas Rhodes, Simon le Bon	Duran Duran
"Last Night in the City" (featuring Kiesza)	2015	Duran Duran	Paper Gods	Co-writer/Producer	John Taylor, Roger Taylor, Nicholas Rhodes, Simon le Bon, Kiesa Rae Ellestad	Duran Duran, Josh Blair
"You Kill Me With Silence"	2015	Duran Duran	Paper Gods	Co-writer/Producer	John Taylor, Roger Taylor, Nicholas Rhodes, Simon le Bon	Duran Duran
"Dancephobia" (featuring Lindsay Lohan)	2015	Duran Duran	Paper Gods	Co-writer/Additional producer	John Taylor, Roger Taylor, Nicholas Rhodes, Simon le Bon, Dominic Brown	Duran Duran, Josh Blair
"What Are the Chances?" (featuring John Frusciante)	2015	Duran Duran	Paper Gods	Co-writer/Additional producer	John Taylor, Roger Taylor, Nicholas Rhodes, Simon le Bon, Dominic Brown	Duran Duran, Josh Blair
"Sunset Garage" (featuring Hollie Cook)	2015	Duran Duran	Paper Gods	Co-writer/Producer	John Taylor, Roger Taylor, Nicholas Rhodes, Simon le Bon	Duran Duran, Josh Blair
"Change the Skyline" (featuring Jonas Bjerre)	2015	Duran Duran	Paper Gods	Co-writer	John Taylor, Roger Taylor, Nicholas Rhodes, Simon le Bon	-
"Only in Dreams"	2015	Duran Duran	Paper Gods	Co-writer/Additional producer	John Taylor, Roger Taylor, Nicholas Rhodes, Simon le Bon, Nile Rodgers, Mark Ronson	Duran Duran, Nile Rodgers, Mark Ronson
"September Song"	2016	JP Cooper	Raised Under Grey Skies	Co-writer	John Paul Cooper, Teemu Brunila, Jonathan Hume	-
"Off White Limousine"	2017	Client Liaison	Diplomatic Immunity	Co-writer	Harvey Miller, Monte Morgan, Daniel Benjamin Cobbe	-
"Great Escape"	2017	Bliss n Eso	Off the Grid	Co-writer	Max MacKinnon, Jonathan Notley, Jonathan Hume	-
"She's on My Mind"	2017	JP Cooper	Raised Under Grey Skies	Co-writer	John Paul Cooper, Teemu Brunila, Jonathan Hume	-
"Beatnik Trip"	2017	Gin Wigmore	Ivory	Co-writer	Gin Wigmore, Steve Rusch	-
"Dopamine" (featuring Thief)	2017	Bliss n Eso	Off the Grid	Co-writer/Producer	Max MacKinnon, Jonathan Notley, Tarik Ejjama, Jonathan Hume, Peter "Thief" Harding	Jon Hume
"Screwed" (featuring Zoë Kravitz)	2018	Janelle Monae	Dirty Computer	Co-writer	Janelle Robinson, Nathaniel Irvin III, Roman GianArthur Irvin, Charles Joseph II	-
"I See Love" (featuring Joe Jonas)	2018	Jonas Blue	Hotel Transylvania 3: OST	Co-writer	Guy James Robin, Mitch Allan, Louis Schoorl	-
"Big Bushy Moustache"	2018	Jake Shears	Jake Shears	Co-writer	Jason Sellards, Jonathan Hume	-
"Clothes Off"	2018	Jake Shears	Jake Shears	Co-writer	Jason Sellards, Christian Hebel, Jonathan Hume	-
"Mississippi Delta (I'm Your Man)"	2018	Jake Shears	Jake Shears	Co-writer	Jason Sellards, Christian Hebel, Jonathan Hume	-

== Music videos ==
Song	Year	Director	References
"There Will Be Tears"	2008	—N/a	—N/a
"Supernova" (featuring Kanye West)	2009	Jonas Euvremer, François Rousselet	—N/a
"White Lies"	2009	Nabil Elderkin	—N/a
"Anyone But Him" (featuring Kanye West)	2009	—N/a	—N/a
"Young Forever" (Jay-Z featuring Mr Hudson)	2009	Anthony Mandler	—N/a
"Instant Messenger"	2009	—N/a	—N/a
"Playing with Fire" (N-Dubz featuring Mr Hudson)	2009	—N/a	—N/a
"Fred Astaire"	2013	Rankin, Vicky Lawton	
"Move"	2013	Rankin	
"Dancing Thru It"	2015	Kirk Edwards	—N/a

=== As Mr Hudson and the Library ===
==== Studio albums ====
Title	Details	Peak chart positions
Title	Details	UK
A Tale of Two Cities	Released: 5 March 2007; Label: Mercury; Formats: CD, digital download	69

=== As BIGkids ===
==== Studio albums ====
Title	Details
Never Grow Up	Released: 7 October 2012; Label: BIGkids Recording; Formats: CD, digital download

==== Singles ====
Single	Year	Album
"Drum in Your Chest"	2012	non-album singles
"Superhero"	2012	non-album singles
"Heart Sing"	2012	Never Grow Up
