= Say You Will (Kanye West song) =

2008 song by Kanye West

- Cover art for the remix of "Say You Will"

Song by Kanye West

from the album 808s & Heartbreak
- Released: November 24, 2008
- Recorded: 2008
- Studio: Glenwood (Burbank, California); Avex Recording (Honolulu, Hawaii)
- Genre: Hip hop; R&B
- Length: 6:17
- Label: Roc-A-Fella; Def Jam
- Songwriters: Kanye West; Jeff Bhasker; Jay Jenkins; Malik Jones; Benjamin McIldowie; Dexter Mills
- Producer: Kanye West

"Say You Will" is a song by American rapper Kanye West, released as the opening track on his fourth studio album, 808s & Heartbreak (2008). The song contains vocals from the Kadockadee Kwire featuring Glenn Jordan, Phillip Ingram, Jim Gilstrap, Romeo Johnson, Kevin Dorsey, and Will Wheaton. It also includes background vocals from Mr Hudson and Tony Williams. The song was produced by West, who co-wrote it with Jeff Bhasker, Young Jeezy, Malik Yusef, Mr Hudson, and Consequence. In 2008, the song was recorded over a time period of 15 minutes. It is a melancholy hip hop and R&B ballad, which features synth-pop production. Lyrically, the song sees West discuss struggling to detach himself from Alexis Phifer.

"Say You Will" received generally positive reviews from music critics, a number of whom named it as one of the album's highlights. Some praised the composition, while several reviewers highlighted the vocals on the song. West performed the song at the 2011 Coachella Valley Music and Arts Festival, and he later narrated a team of singers through a performance of it at Nebuchadnezzar in 2019. The song was used in a trailer for West's film Jesus Is King (2019), before subsequently being featured in the film. Mobius Band shared a cover version of it in February 2009, which samples children's voices. A remix of the song was released in October 2015 that features Caroline Shaw. On the electro–orchestral remix, the strength of the vocals is increased and violins from Shaw are added.

== Background and recording ==
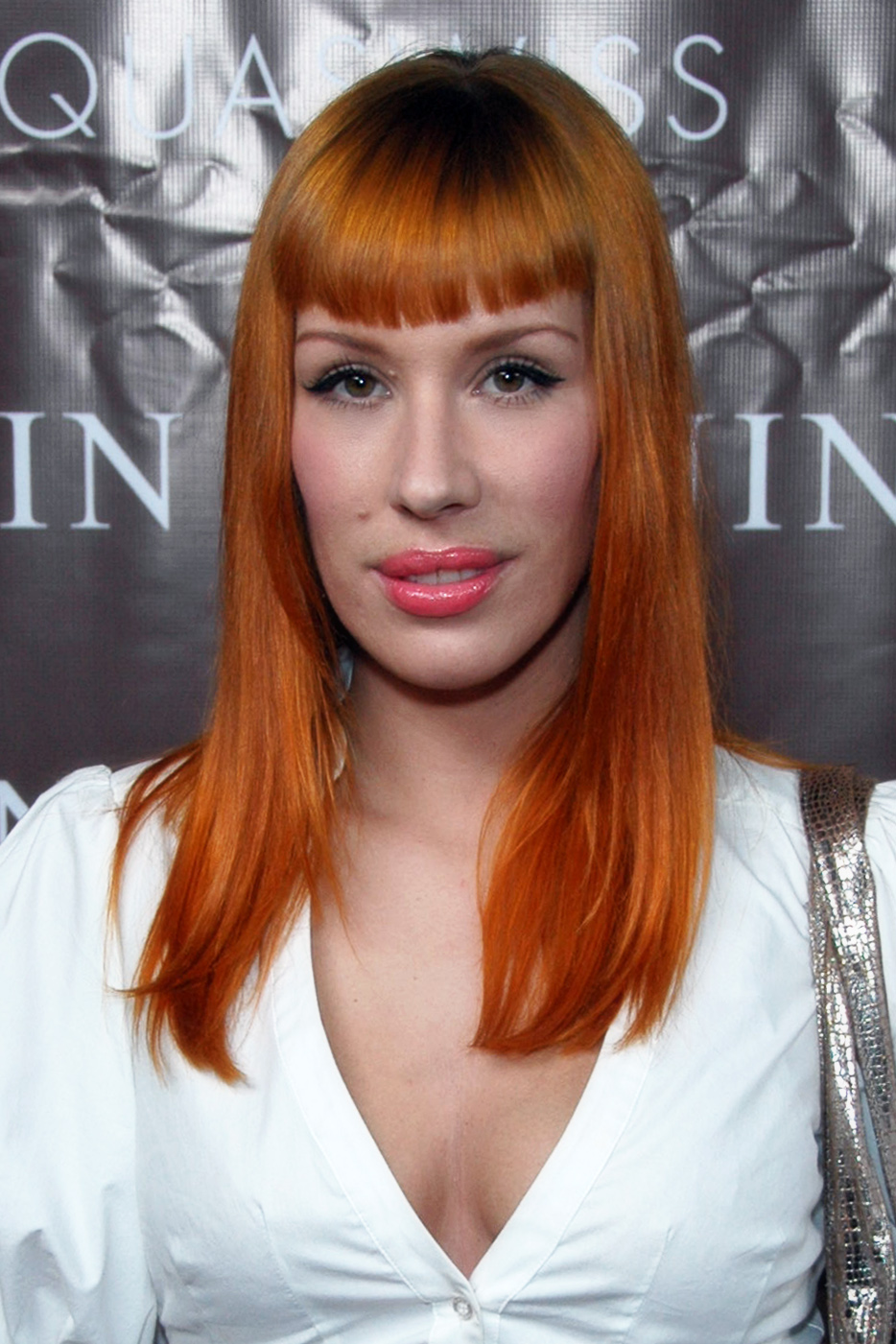
Esthero persuaded West to keep the beginning of the song's chorus, regardless of how many lyrics he re-recorded.

Outside of "Say You Will", English musician Mr Hudson co-wrote fellow 808s & Heartbreak track "Street Lights" and contributed a feature to "Paranoid". The musician was on vacation in Paris when he received a phone call from West, who was drawn in by his charm. After Mr Hudson's contributions to the album, West went on to sign him to his record label GOOD Music. The musician subsequently released his debut studio album Straight No Chaser under the label in October 2009, with West contributing vocals on the single "Supernova". "Say You Will" was solely produced by West, who served as a songwriter alongside Jeff Bhasker, Young Jeezy, Malik Yusef, Mr Hudson, and Consequence. An 11-piece orchestra contributed to the song, which was conducted by Larry Gold. (Note: See credits and personnel for the roles of the entire orchestra.)

Throughout the album, West uses Auto-Tune on his voice. During the three week period that he worked on the entirety of 808s & Heartbreak in 2008, "Say You Will" was recorded in 15 minutes. Seeking out a minimalist direction sonically, West directed his team to bring unique drum machines to Avex Recording Studio in Honolulu, Hawaii. They were sampled and reprogrammed into West's Roland TR-808 drum machine at the studio, which recording engineer Anthony Kilhoffer explained was responsible for the song's "unique sounds". West further ventured in a new musical direction, crafting buzzsaw and icy synths that are juxtaposed with sonic flourishes on "Say You Will". On the album's 10th anniversary in 2018, Canadian singer-songwriter Esthero remembered witnessing the peak of West's singing and songwriting capabilities as it was recorded and sang the line "Hey, hey, hey, hey, don't say you will" from the song's chorus. She emphasized the notes West settled on when he sang the line and recalled having begged him: "I don't care how many of these lines you re-record. I know you have to write lyrics and you're going to re-record them. That one, do not get rid of that. Please keep that. It's magic."

== Composition and lyrics ==
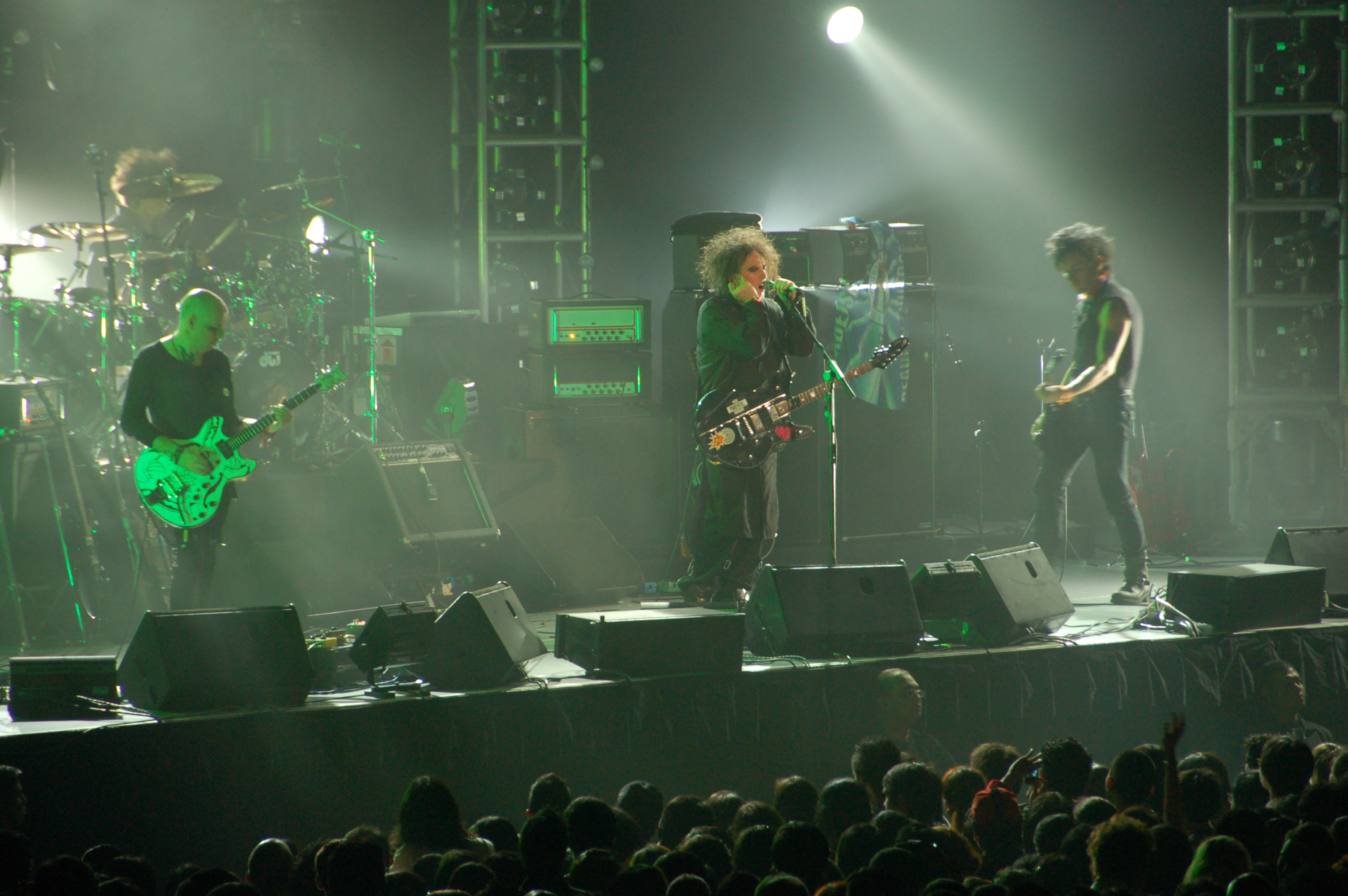
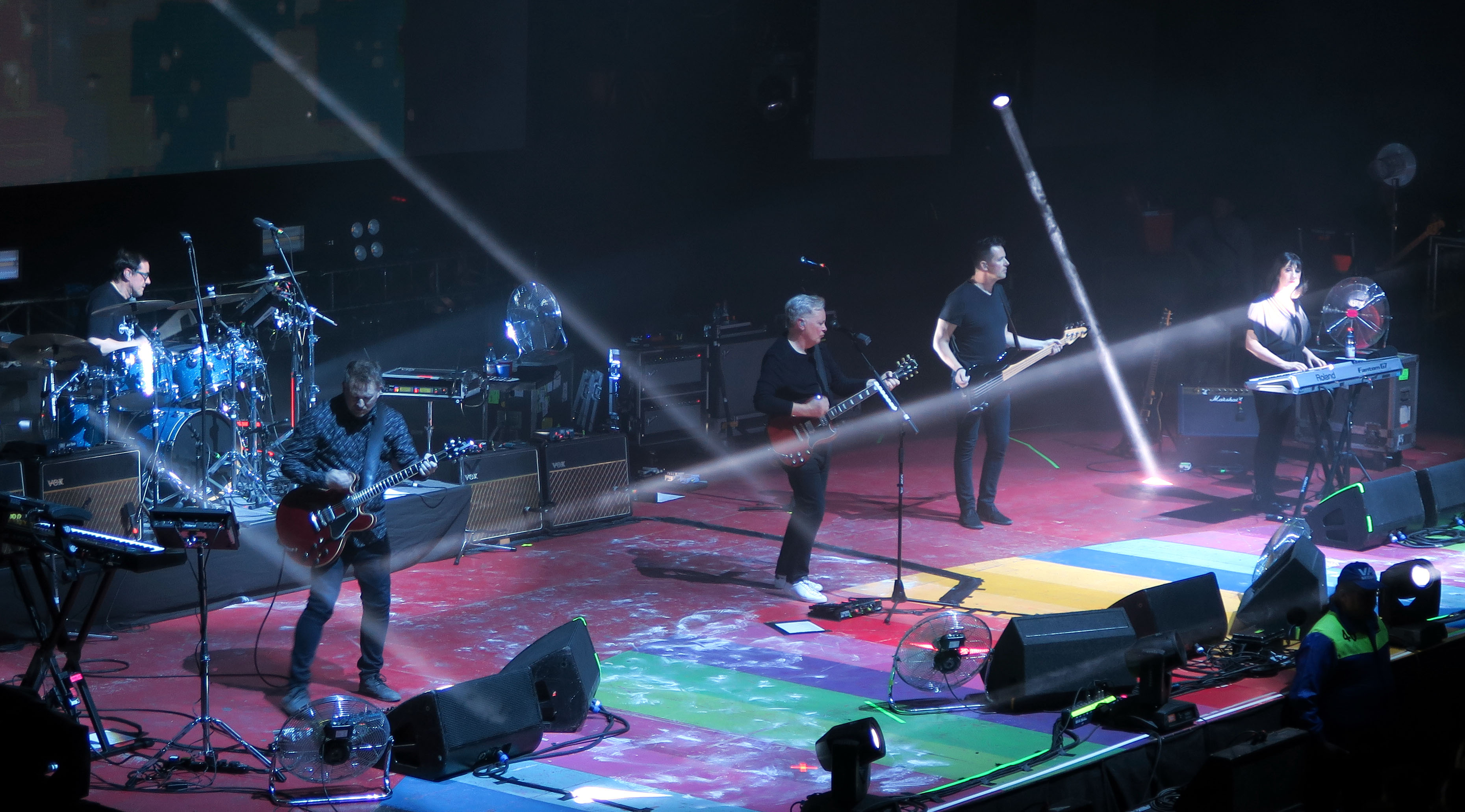
The Cure (left) and New Order (right) influenced the song's gothic and dank electronic elements, which are combined with its lead genres of hip hop and R&B.

Musically, "Say You Will" is a melancholy hip hop and R&B ballad. The song features synth-pop production, with gothic and dank electronic influences of the Cure and New Order. Contrasting with most rap and pop songs, the chorus-verse-chorus-verse structure is not used. Two icy synth notes are repeated back and forth on the song, which it primarily relies on. The notes are backed by drums, as well as vocals from monk choir the Kadockadee Kwire featuring Glenn Jordan, Phillip Ingram, Jim Gilstrap, Romeo Johnson, Kevin Dorsey, and Will Wheaton. The song also prominently features electronic buzzsaw synths, sparse percussion, and piano. Strings, violin, viola, cello, and heavy bass are included on the song. Gold arranged the strings, while Jeff Chestek engineered them with assistance from Rick Friedrich, Montez Roberts, and John Stahl. West starts to sing six seconds into the song, following a few of the notes. He utilizes Auto-Tune on his voice, singing until the song's 3 minutes and 15 seconds mark. West's performance is succeeded by an extended instrumental outro, which utilizes the Roland TR-808 and echoes choral vocals for around three minutes. Background vocals are contributed to the song by Mr Hudson and Tony Williams.

In the lyrics of the song, West speaks of being unable to pull himself away from his ex-fiancé Alexis Phifer. According to him, the song is about that "ex-girlfriend you call on Friday nights just to have sex". West begins the chorus by singing, "Hey, hey, hey, hey, don't say you will". He expresses misery on the song with the lyrics "When I grab your neck / I touch your soul".

== Release and reception ==
On November 24, 2008, "Say You Will" was included as the first track on West's fourth studio album 808s & Heartbreak. The song was met with generally positive reviews from music critics, mostly being identified by them as an album highlight. While naming the song as one of the album's tracks to be downloaded, The Washington Post's Chris Richards noted it contains "equally rich sonic detail" to "Street Lights". He analyzed, characterizing the song as sounding like slow riffing from "Kraftwerk and a choir of Gregorian monkbots" on the Beatles' "Eleanor Rigby" (1966) and observing how West "allows the beat to plink and plonk off into infinity" after his Auto-Tuned performance. Richards wrote that the "three gorgeous, wordless minutes" provide clarity of West "no longer clamoring for our undivided attention", instead "giving us enough space to step back and watch him take a brilliant left turn". Reviewing the album for The Independent, Andy Gill recommended it as one of the songs to download. Steve Jones from USA Today made the same recommendation in his review. Writing for RapReviews, Jesal 'Jay Soul' Padania named "the opening strands of the haunting 'Hey-hey-hey-hey'" on the song among the moments of 808s & Heartbreak that will remained in one's mind "for a good while". At the Chicago Sun-Times, Jim DeRogatis selected the song as one of the notable times on the album where West's formula of Auto-Tune usage "is touching and very effective". Scott Plagenhoef from Pitchfork opined that the song has one of the "biggest vocal lines" on the album, before ultimately reaching "a three-minute, table-setting outro-- a patient, defeated-sounding collection of choral vocals and drum machines".

PopMatters contributor Dave Heaton stated the song "sets the mood well" for 808s & Heartbreak with its two "simple synth notes" that repeat back and forth similarly to a ping-pong game, recognizing the "strangeness" lent by them. He further noticed that "an emotional foundation" is provided by the song's 1980s "soft-pop piano" and the "extended outro" after West's performance places emphasis on "the feeling of the song while introducing the fact that West's presence as a composer/arranger" is equally or possibly more important to the album than his microphone presence. In Hotpress, Alison Curtis called the song "six minutes of remorseful chanting". The staff of The Observer viewed the song as sounding like R. Kelly taking on the style of Kraftwerk, labeling it "a slow jam built around a simple radioactive pulse". Jozen Cummings of Vibe described the album as West "trying to get something off his chest" while he attempts "to push something through", noting how most artists do not begin their albums with a ballad like West "does with the melancholy 'Say You Will'". Cara Nash from No Ripcord viewed the song as setting the album's mood "with two synth notes beeping back and forth, desolate and bleak". Nash elaborated, saying the notes are backed by "a haunting synth choir and drums", and the song's "extended outro" serves as a reminder of West's heartbreak being "defeating and relentless". Billboard reviewer Mariel Concepcion called the subject matter of West being "unable to wrench himself away from an ex-lover" interesting, though felt that the song lacks the funness of fellow album tracks "Amazing" and "See You in My Nightmares". In a negative review for musicOMH, Adam Conner-Simons defined "Say You Will" as setting the tone for the "spaced-out synth-pop production" on 808s & Heartbreak that is simple and minimal. He continued, commenting that the song "indifferently drip-drop[s] along for more than six minutes amid thin choral arrangements and bare-bones percussion".

== Live performances ==
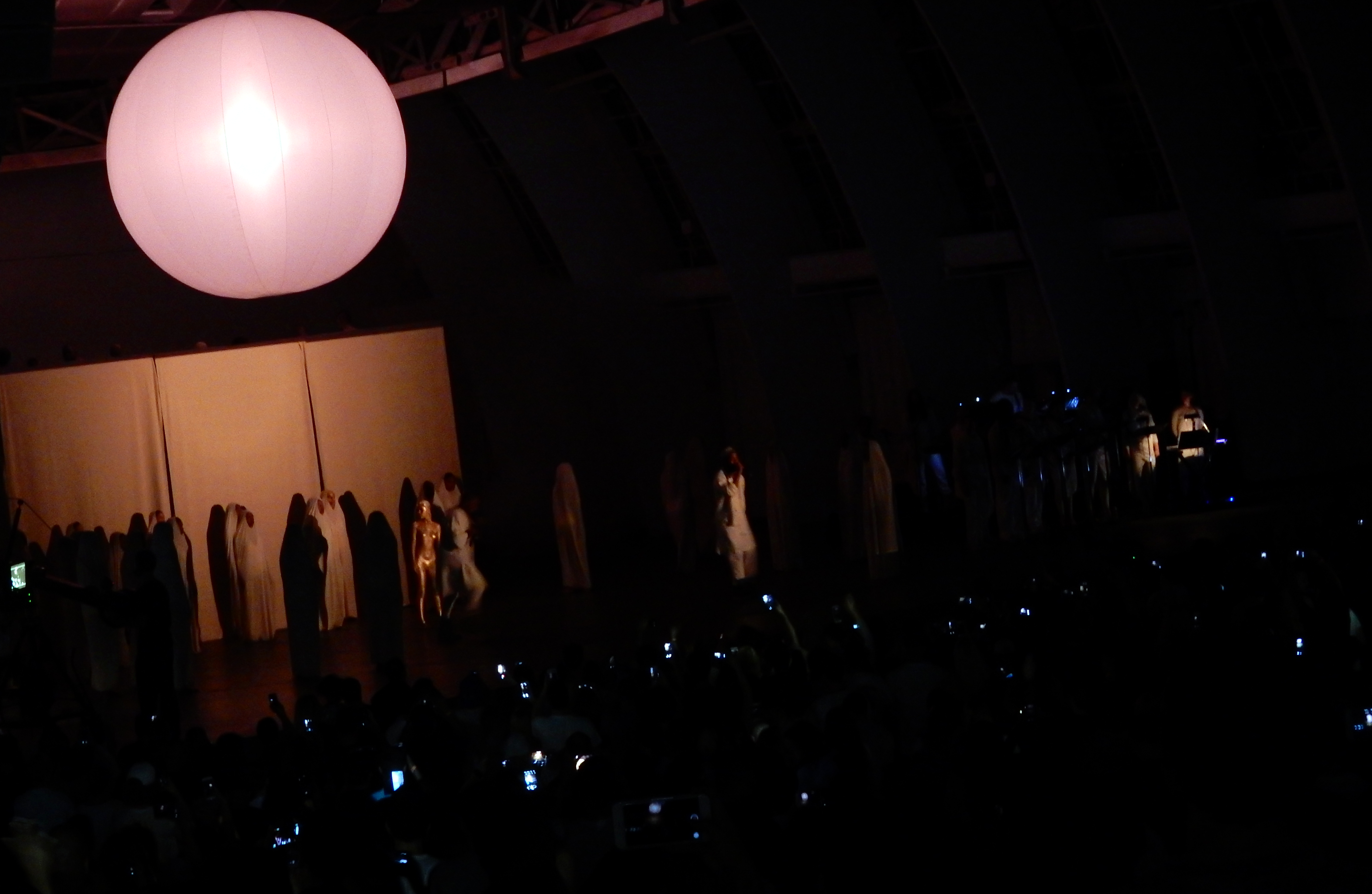
West performing the song live at the Hollywood Bowl in 2015, accompanied by a gold-painted Zoë Kravitz in the center of the lightless stage.

West performed the song for the sixth number of his February 2009 VH1 show, which was later released as his second live album VH1 Storytellers in January 2010. Spooky keyboards backed West for the performance, while he also told the story behind the song. During his headlining set for the 2009 Wireless Festival at Hyde Park in London, West followed declaring the song his favorite on 808s & Heartbreak by performing a highly emotional version of it. While performing, he wore his customary aviator shades and black suit jacket while. Kanye delivered a performance of the song for his headlining set at the 2011 Coachella Festival, which saw him declare the set his "most important" show since his mother Donda West's death. Kanye West also said during the song's performance that as he wrote "Power" (2009), he had envisioned performing it on the stage of Coachella. On February 22, 2012, West freestyled over the song for seven minutes during a concert in Melbourne, Australia. The freestyle included West recounting having contacted an ex-lover late at night; he requested her to come over and was led into believing she would take up his offer, but he was ultimately denied.

For a January 2013 concert in Abu Dhabi on The Yeezus Tour, West began to perform "Say You Will", before transitioning into both freestyling and ranting. During the concert, West wore a straitjacket. At the 2013 Governors Ball, West performed the song. For West's two night concert of 808s & Heartbreak in its entirety at the 2015 Hollywood Bowl in September, he performed the song as the first track, beginning at 9:19 p.m. West wore loose garments in white and off-white shades as he performed, while desert-trek boots served as his footwear. He was supported by a small band, a medium-sized orchestra, and backing singers. The lights went out as soon as the performance started, which was accompanied by fireworks. West sang to American actress Zoë Kravitz throughout, who was covered in gold paint and sulked in the center of the stage. He faced the direction of the orchestra and singers, rarely looking towards the crowd. Around one minute into the performance, West requested his band to restart the song. During the outro, he had a standoff of sorts with Kravitz. On November 24, 2019, West served as the offstage narrator for his debut opera Nebuchadnezzar while the song was performed by a team of singers, who sang the orchestral coda as a recurring motif.

== In popular culture ==
American trio Mobius Band released a cover version of the song on their EP Empire of Love on February 11, 2009, coinciding with Valentine's Day. The cover maintains the original's melancholic tone, though has the addition of samples of children's voices and features no Auto-Tune. Canadian musician Drake rapped over the song's beat on "Say What's Real", which was included on his third mixtape So Far Gone in February 2009. In December 2018, West tweeted a screenshot of a text message that informed him Drake had sent a clearance request for the song. Subsequently, West declined the request after ranting on Twitter and engaging in a phone call with Drake. The mixtape was later released to streaming services on its 10th anniversary in February 2019 with the song included; West ultimately granted his approval and received credit as a composer. Drake clarified via Instagram that he rapped over the beat because West "just made the best shit". In August 2016, West's wife Kim Kardashian included "Say You Will" on a playlist of her 28 favorite songs from him.

On October 17, 2019, West shared a trailer for his concert film Jesus Is King that is slightly over a minute in length. The trailer is soundtracked by a gospel reinterpretation of the song with new lyrics, which is delivered by a choir as a temple-like image is displayed. They continue to sing the reinterpretation while the image gives way to a biblical quote from the New Testament Book of Mark: "In the words of Jesus Christ, 'The time is fulfilled, and the Kingdom of God is at hand, repent and believe in the gospel.'" The film was released simultaneously with West's ninth studio album of the same name on October 25, 2019, and the former includes West and his gospel group the Sunday Service Choir performing the song as a rap hymn.

== Remix ==
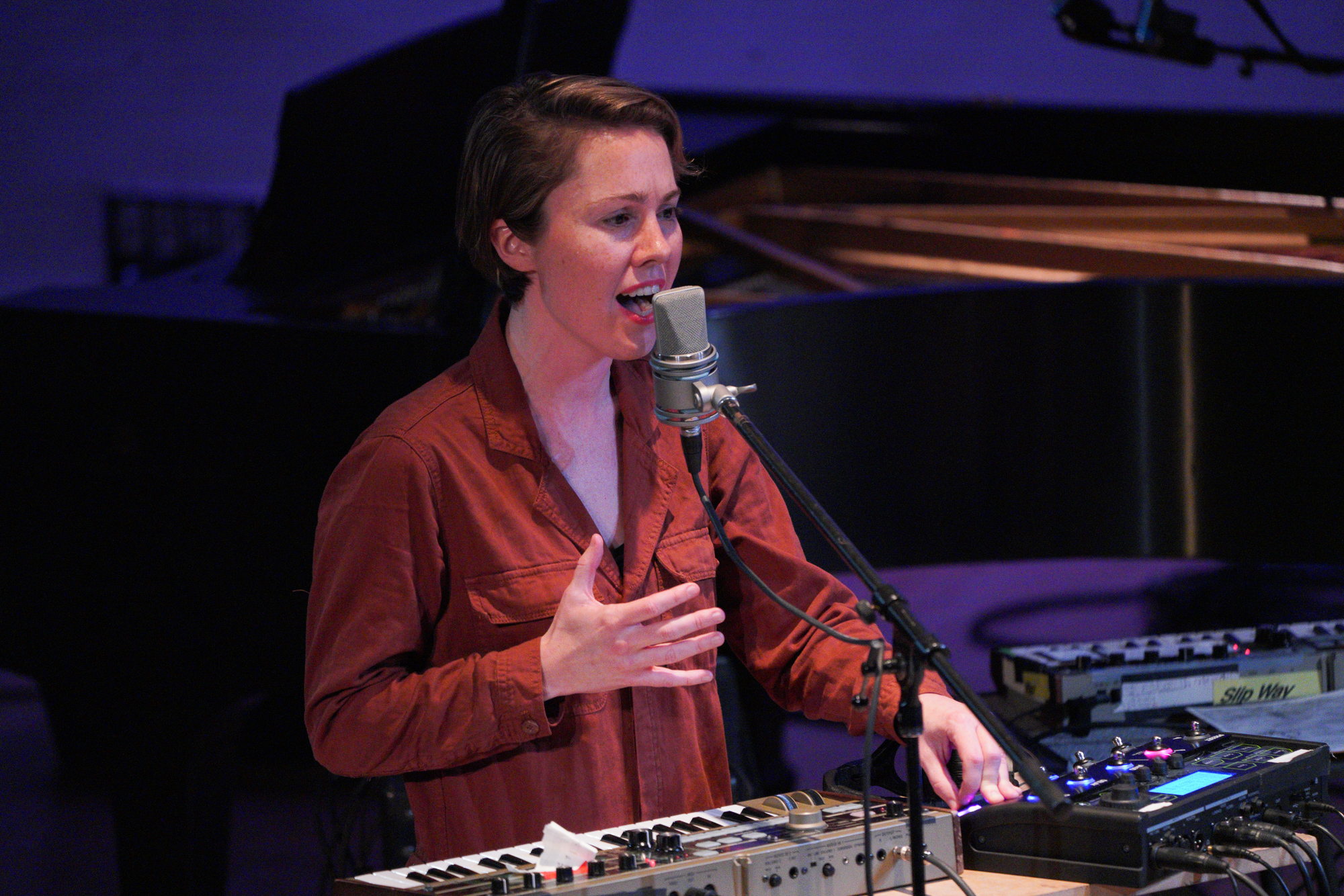
The remix features vocals from Caroline Shaw.

A remix of "Say You Will", featuring violinist and composer Caroline Shaw, was uploaded by West to his SoundCloud on October 19, 2015, alongside a remix of the Weeknd's "Tell Your Friends" under the title of "When I See It". The cover art for both is a photo of flowers, which had been used for merchandise at West's 808s & Heartbreak concert. Photographer Nick Knight released a body of large still-life images alongside his "Flora" exhibition of flowers in 2012, with the artwork being one of the images from the body. Manipulation by heat and water was used for the image's development process, creating the visual effect of melting flowers. According to Shaw, West first approached her backstage at a 2014 performance and requested her phone number. Shaw remembered starting off not overly enthusiastic about a collaboration, saying that one of West's producers "asked me if I'd be interested on working on songs for a live show with an orchestra", leading to her getting "the sense that maybe he wanted to ask me to be a composer and orchestrate something, and that wasn't something that was really interesting" due to the role being fulfilled by many people. She further recalled not doing anything "for a week or two", before taking "a deep dive into [the West album] 808s and Heartbreak", and admitted: "Say You Will is the song that hit me most." Shaw explained that the song "does something with music that I love: the last two minutes [of it], nothing happens. Absolutely nothing". The remix was recorded in the lead up to the album concert.

Musically, the remix of "Say You Will" is an electro–orchestral ballad. The remix was arranged by Shaw, who played additional violins. The remix and subsequent Hollywood Bowl remixes for West's 808s & Heartbreak concert were co-produced with Shaw and film and television composer Trevor Gureckis in his studio in New York City. Gureckis introduced Shaw to the "VoiceLive" vocoder which she used for harmonizing with a midi keyboard input. The opening is wordless, featuring Shaw recalling her earlier work by singing unconnected vowel and consonant sounds. As the remix continues, West's vocal melody changes while his voice gets louder. At the same time, the timbre of Shaw's voice opens and pizzicato strings come in. The remix reached number two on the Billboard Twitter Trending 140 chart in October 2015, being held off the summit by "When I See It".

== Credits and personnel ==
Information taken from 808s & Heartbreak liner notes.

Recording

- Recorded at Glenwood Studios (Burbank, California) and Avex Recording Studio (Honolulu, Hawaii)

Personnel

- Kanye West – songwriter, producer
- Jeff Bhasker – songwriter, keyboards
- Mr Hudson – songwriter, background vocals
- Jay Jenkins – songwriter
- Malik Jones – songwriter
- Dexter Mills – songwriter
- Andrew Dawson – recorder
- Anthony Kilhoffer – recorder
- Chad Carlisle – assistant recorder
- Isha Erskine – assistant recorder
- Gaylord Holomalia – assistant recorder
- Christian Mochizuki – assistant recorder
- Manny Marroquin – mix engineer
- Christian Plata – assistant engineer
- Erik Madrid – assistant engineer
- Jeff Chestek – string engineer
- Rick Friedrich – assistant string engineer
- Montez Roberts – assistant string engineer
- John Stahl – assistant string engineer

Additional musicians

- The Kadockadee Kwire – vocals
- Glenn Jordan – featured vocals
- Phillip Ingram – featured vocals
- Jim Gilstrap – featured vocals
- Romeo Johnson – featured vocals
- Kevin Dorsey – featured vocals
- Will Wheaton – featured vocals
- Tony Williams – background vocals
- Larry Gold – string arrangement and conducting
- Olga Konopelsky – violin
- Emma Kummrow – violin
- Luigi Mazzochi – violin
- Charles Parker – violin
- Igor Szwec – violin
- Gregory Teperman – violin
- Davis Barnett – viola
- Alexandra Leem – viola
- James J. Cooper, III – cello
- Jennie Lorenzo – cello
- Miles Davis – bass
