= Love Never Dies =

Love Never Dies may refer to:

- Love Never Dies (1916 film), an American film directed by William Worthington
- Love Never Dies (1921 film), an American silent drama directed by King Vidor
- Love Never Dies (1955 film), an Argentine romantic drama directed and written by Luis César Amadori
- "Love Never Dies" (song), a 1988 song by Belinda Carlisle
- "Love Never Dies (Back for the First Time)", a 2010 song by Caspa and Mr Hudson
- "Love Never Dies", a song from the 1996 album Kissing Rain by Roch Voisine
- Love Never Dies (musical), the 2010 sequel to The Phantom of the Opera
