= U-Sing =

2009 video game

- U-SING (Australian Packaging)
- Developer: Mindscape
- Publisher: Mindscape
- Platform: Wii
- Release: PAL: November 6, 2009
- Genre: Karaoke
- Mode: 7 game modes

U-Sing is a karaoke-style video game for the Wii published in 2009 by Mindscape and developed by their French division in partnership with Universal Music.

== Gameplay ==
Gameplay is similar to other karaoke console games currently available, such as SingStar, where the player(s) choose a song from a list of tunes on the disc. The player(s) are then to sing the tune of the song through a Logitech microphone connected to the Wii. The software then measures the player's performance in voice tonality and rhythm and scores the singer according to their accuracy.

== Features ==
In 2010, players were able to download more of tracks from the Universal Music’s catalogue, as well as tracks from other record labels. Available through the WiiWare on the Wii Shop Channel on the Wii console and could be purchased using Nintendo Points. Other features include:

- A specific playlist for each country
- 30 hits to sing with the original clips from Universal top artists
- High precision speech recognition using VoxLer Technology, accurately evaluating tune and rhythm
- 3 levels of difficulty, short and long version available for each song
- From up to 2 players with 2 microphones
- Listening from the performances
- 7 gameplays : Training, Solo, Duo, Duel, Battle, Jukebox, Medley

== Track list ==
(United Kingdom, Australia & Netherlands)

No.	Title	Length
1.	"I'm Not Gonna Teach Your Boyfriend How to Dance with You" (Black Kids)	3:37
2.	"Better (Cover)" (Boyzone)	3:35
3.	"Viva La Vida" (Coldplay)	4:02
4.	"Do you really want to hurt me (Cover)" (Daniela Procopio)	3:22
5.	"Mercy" (Duffy)	3:39
6.	"Outta Here" (Esmée Denters)	3:21
7.	"I Will Survive" (Gloria Gaynor)
8.	"ABC" (Jackson 5)	2:54
9.	"Wonderful World" (James Morrison)

1. Just Jack - The day I died
2. Keane - Somewhere Only We Know
3. Kool & the Gang - Celebration
4. La Roux - Bulletproof
5. Lady Gaga - Eh, Eh (Nothing Else I Can Say)
6. Lily Allen - 22
7. Lionel Richie - All Night Long
8. Mika - Love Today
9. Mr Hudson and the Library - Too Late, Too Late
10. Orson - No Tomorrow
11. Sam Brown - Stop
12. Snow Patrol - Crack the Shutters
13. Stereophonics - Have a Nice Day
14. Texas - I Don't Want a Lover
15. The All-American Rejects - I Wanna
16. The Cure - Boys Don't Cry
17. The Kooks - Always Where I Need To Be
18. The Mamas & the Papas - California Dreamin'
19. The Pussycat Dolls - When I Grow Up
20. The Saturdays - Issues
21. The Temptations - My Girl
