= Young Forever =

2009 single by Jay-Z

Single by Jay-Z featuring Mr Hudson

from the album The Blueprint 3
- Released: January 11, 2010
- Genre: Alternative hip hop
- Length: 4:13
- Label: Roc Nation; Atlantic
- Songwriters: Shawn Carter; Kanye West; Marian Gold; Bernhard Lloyd; Frank Mertens
- Producer: Kanye West

Jay-Z singles chronology
"I Wanna Rock (The Kings' G-Mix)" (2010)	"Young Forever" (2009)	"XXXO" (2010)

Mr. Hudson singles chronology
"White Lies" (2009)	"Young Forever" (2009)	"Playing with Fire" (2010)

Music video
- "Young Forever" on YouTube

"Young Forever" is a song by American rapper Jay-Z, released in early 2010 as the fifth single from his 2009 album The Blueprint 3 on the Roc Nation label. The song was produced by Kanye West. It is a rework of Alphaville's 1984 song "Forever Young": the original melody is retained, British singer Mr Hudson sings the original lyrics (primarily during the first verse and the chorus), and Jay-Z raps during the following verses in place of the original song's additional verses.

It was released as the third official single in the United Kingdom ("D.O.A. (Death of Auto-Tune)" was never officially released there). In that country, the song was originally scheduled to be released on the same day as Mr. Hudson's other collaboration with N-Dubz, "Playing with Fire", but the single was pushed back until January 25, 2010.

The song has been performed several times by Jay-Z accompanied by Beyoncé in place of Mr. Hudson, such as at the 2010 Coachella festival where Jay-Z was a headline act. Jay-Z brought out Beyoncé as a surprise guest and performed the closing song of the night. The couple also performed the song on New Year's Eve in 2010 at a concert at the Las Vegas Cosmopolitan Hotel. The song has also been used as the encore for both of their joint On the Run (2014) and On the Run II (2018) all-stadium tours.

== Background ==
"Young Forever" was first released in the UK on January 11, 2010. It was later serviced to Rhythm/Crossover and Top 40/Mainstream radio stations in the United States on January 26 and February 23, 2010, respectively. A solo version by Mr. Hudson was released as a bonus track on his 2009 album Straight No Chaser.

== Chart performance ==
After strong coverage on the radio throughout December 2009 and January 2010, "Young Forever" began to receive increasing digital downloads.

Following the release of the album, the song debuted at number 75 on the Billboard Hot 100 and reached number 41 due to strong digital downloads the following week. Following its release as a single, the song re-entered the Billboard Hot 100 at number 97 and went on to peak at number 10, giving Jay-Z his 17th top ten single, reaching a new record previously shared with Ludacris as the rapper with the most Top 10 hits.

In the United Kingdom, the single entered at number 27 on the UK Singles Chart. The next week, "Young Forever" climbed eight places to number 19. A few weeks later, the song peaked at number 10 on the chart.

In Ireland, the single entered at number 36 the Irish Singles Chart. A week later, "Young Forever" climbed five places in the chart to number 31. The single later climbed to its peak of #14.

The song was the world's 19th most digitally sold song of the first half of 2010 with over 1,606,000 units sold, as of July 2010 it has sold 2,050,000 copies.

"Young Forever" was certified platinum in May 2012 by the Federazione Industria Musicale Italiana. In 2014, following the performance of the song at the last two concerts in Paris on September 13 during the On the Run Tour, the song managed to debut on the French Singles Chart the following week at the position of 168.

== Music video ==
The music video was released on December 22, 2009, on Jay-Z's official YouTube channel. Directed by Anthony Mandler, the video is in black-and-white and shows various aspects of youth across America, intercut with scenes of Jay-Z and Mr. Hudson performing the song, sometimes in concert. Singer Rita Ora makes a cameo appearance in the video. Concert scenes were filmed at Alexandra Palace in London on November 4, 2009. The video is produced by Andrew Listermann of Riveting Entertainment. The peewee football team featured in the video, E.O.M (Edward O'Malley) is a South Philadelphia sports organization.

== Charts ==
=== Weekly charts ===
Weekly chart performance for "Young Forever"
Chart (2009–2010)	Peak position
Australia (ARIA)	28
Canada Hot 100 (Billboard)	21
Eurochart Hot 100	28
France (SNEP)	129
Ireland (IRMA)	11
Italy (FIMI)	5
Netherlands (Single Top 100)	50
New Zealand (Recorded Music NZ)	32
Poland Airplay (ZPAV)	1
Sweden (Sverigetopplistan)	40
Switzerland (Schweizer Hitparade)	44
UK Singles (Official Charts)	10
UK Hip Hop/R&B (Official Charts)	2
US Billboard Hot 100	10
US Hot R&B/Hip-Hop Songs (Billboard)	86
US Hot Rap Songs (Billboard)	16
US Pop Airplay (Billboard)	12

=== Year-end charts ===
2009 year-end chart performance for "Young Forever"
Chart (2009)	Position
UK Singles (OCC)	199

2010 year-end chart performance for "Young Forever"
Chart (2010)	Position
Canada (Canadian Hot 100)	71
Italy Airplay (EarOne)	39
UK Singles (OCC)	100
US Billboard Hot 100	50

== Certifications ==
Region	Certification	Certified units/sales
Italy (FIMI)	Platinum	20,000^{*}
New Zealand (RMNZ)	Gold	15,000^{‡}
United Kingdom (BPI)	Platinum	600,000^{‡}
United States (RIAA)	3× Platinum	3,000,000^{‡}
^{*} Sales figures based on certification alone.^{‡} Sales+streaming figures based on certification alone.

== Release history ==
Release dates and formats for "Young Forever"
Region	Date	Format	Label(s)	Ref.
United States	February 23, 2010	Mainstream airplay	Roc Nation	
