= White Lies (Mr Hudson song) =

Single by Mr Hudson

from the album Straight No Chaser
- Released: 12 October 2009
- Recorded: 2009
- Genre: Synth-pop; new wave; alternative R&B
- Length: 3:10
- Label: GOOD; Mercury
- Songwriters: Benjamin McIldowie; Kaywan Qazzaz; Sef Naqui
- Producer: Dave McCracken

Mr Hudson singles chronology
"Supernova" (2009)	"White Lies" (2009)	"Young Forever" (2010)

"White Lies" is a song British singer Mr Hudson, released on 12 October 2009 in the United Kingdom. It is taken from his second studio album, Straight No Chaser. The song is Hudson's third single as a solo artist. "White Lies" made the BBC Radio 1 – A List.

== Critical reception ==
Mayer Nissim of Digital Spy gave the song a positive review stating:

To put it mildly, life's changed a bit for Ben Hudson since he and his folky crossover group The Library just missed the top 40 with 'Too Late, Too Late' in 2007. The Library are no more, while Hudson himself has been taken under the wing of none other than Kanye West – producer of Jay-Z, critic of Taylor Swift and a bona fide pop superstar in his own right.

Following the number two smash 'Supernova' comes 'White Lies', which like the rest of upcoming album Straight No Chaser has been "executive produced" by West. A shameless admission of being economical with the truth in pursuit of love, it doesn't quite have the explosive pull of its predecessor. Despite that, it's still a diverting enough synth-driven track that succeeds in fusing Hudson's melodic strengths and ear for a hook with the downbeat feel of West's 808s & Heartbreak album.

The song was awarded a 3 star.

== Promotion ==
Mr Hudson performed the song at the 2009 MOBO Awards in Glasgow, Scotland. Hudson also performed the song on The Paul O'Grady Show in October 2009.

He also performed the track in the Radio 1 Live Lounge.

== Music video ==
The music video for" White Lies" showed Ben Hudson singing the song in front of a background which lights up with various colours. It also shows Hudson with black hair wearing a black jacket singing the song. It was shot in 2009.

== Chart performance ==
The song entered the UK Singles Chart on 18 October 2009 at number 20. In the song's second week it fell to #29. In its third week it fell to #70.

Chart (2009)	Peak position
UK Singles Chart	20
Scottish Singles Charts	21
