= Gotta Have It (Jay-Z and Kanye West song) =

2011 single by Kanye West and Jay-Z

Single by Jay-Z and Kanye West

from the album Watch the Throne
- Released: December 6, 2011
- Recorded: 2011
- Genre: Hip-hop
- Length: 2:20
- Label: Roc-A-Fella; Roc Nation; Def Jam
- Songwriters: Kanye West; Shawn Carter; Pharrell Williams; James Brown; Joseph Roach; Tony Pinckney; Fred Wesley
- Producers: The Neptunes; Kanye West (co.)

Jay-Z singles chronology
"Why I Love You" (2011)	"Gotta Have It" (2011)	"I Do" (2012)

Kanye West singles chronology
"Why I Love You" (2011)	"Gotta Have It" (2011)	"No Church in the Wild" (2012)

"Gotta Have It" is a song by American rappers Kanye West and Jay-Z from their collaborative album, Watch the Throne (2011). The song was produced by West and the Neptunes, and samples three original compositions by James Brown: "Don't Tell a Lie About Me and I Won't Tell the Truth About You", "People Get Up and Drive Your Funky Soul" and "My Thang". The song explores themes of wealth, decadence and the economic stature in the US. The song received positive reviews from critics who complimented the production and the clever wordplay of the two rappers.

The song was released as the sixth single from Watch the Throne on December 6, 2011. The song peaked at number 69 on the US Billboard Hot 100 entered the top 15 both the US Billboard Hot Rap Songs and Hot R&B/Hip-Hop Songs charts. The song has since been certified Platinum in the United States. Jay-Z and West performed the song as part of the set list of their Watch the Throne Tour and at the 2012 Radio 1's Big Weekend musical festival.

== Background ==
American rappers Jay-Z and Kanye West had previously collaborated on several tracks together on songs such as "Swagga Like Us", "Run This Town", and "Monster". In 2010, they began production and recording together for a collaborative record titled Watch the Throne. "Gotta Have It" was co-produced by West and the lead producers were the production duo the Neptunes. It incorporates chopped-up James Brown vocal samples and Eastern flute melodies. The song samples three different songs; "Don't Tell a Lie About Me and I Won't Tell the Truth About You", "People Get Up and Drive Your Funky Soul" and "My Thang", and was reportedly very expensive to produce. The track was released as the album's sixth single in the US, and it impacted Urban radio on December 6, 2011, and Rhythmic radio on January 31, 2012. The track was performed by West and Jay on their Watch the Throne tour. During Jay-Z's setlist at the 2012 Radio 1's Big Weekend festival, West joined Jay-Z to perform "Gotta Have It" and other Watch the Throne hits, including the singles "Niggas in Paris" and "No Church in the Wild".

== Composition ==
"Gotta Have It"
A 20 second sample of "Gotta Have It" which showcase's West's first verse of the song and the start of Jay-Z's.

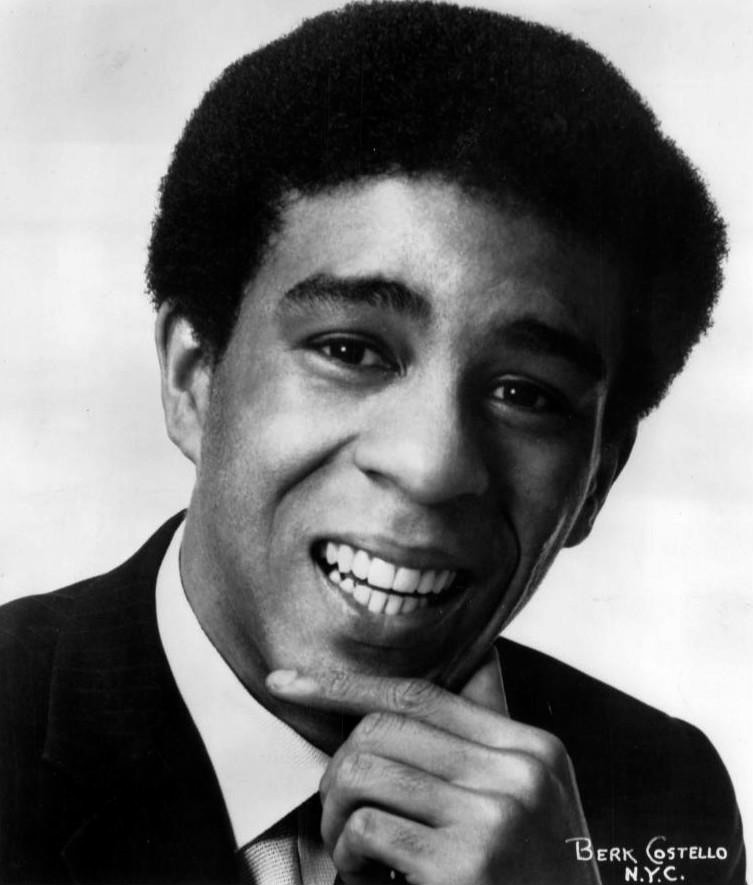
Jay-Z uses a homophone connecting the pronunciation of the words "richer" and "prior" to comedian Richard Pryor.

"Gotta Have It" unites "Kanye and the Neptunes to crazily chop up James Brown vocal samples and Eastern flute melodies." The song contains "haunting backing vocals and an accompanying tambourine" with the two rappers trading verses with the vocal riff playing over them. The song features "diced-up vocal snippets and gut-punching bass back aggressive rhymes" and includes a reference to the YC song "Racks" which is a "nod to the contemporary rap trends the track both embraces and outpaces." While some tracks on Watch the Throne give the "star rappers turns at the mic," "Gotta Have It" is "pure tag-team hip-hop, with the two trading off verses and finishing each other's lines." The song contains moments of the two rappers "finishing each others' Ferris Bueller and Miami Heat jokes over a chopped-up James Brown yelps" provided by the Neptunes.

== Reception ==
"Gotta Have It" received mostly positive reviews from music critics. Sputnikmusic's Tyler Fisher stated that "The Neptunes turn in their best beat in years on 'Gotta Have It', sampling James Brown in a realm completely removed from funk and soul." Slant Magazine's Matthew Cole stated that "the duo volleys boasts at each other on 'Otis' and do call-and-response riffing on 'Gotta Have It', sounding like a pair of hustlers who can't believe how much they've gotten away with. The chemistry between the two friends and self-described sibling rivals is conveyed perfectly on those two tracks."

David Amidon of PopMatters commented that several songs on the album are a "whirlwind of excitement, particularly 'Gotta Have It', which finds Kanye and Jay spitting such decadent, pro-Black-laden material as 'Maybachs on bachs on bachs on bachs on bachs / Who in that? / Oh, shit, it's just blacks on blacks on blacks'." Popdust's Emily Exton reported that "the two trade lines instead of verses in what results in a surefire example of what can happen when two pros team up." The song peaked at number 69 on the US Billboard Hot 100, and at numbers 14, 13 and 17 on the Billboard Hot R&B/Hip-Hop Songs, Hot Rap Songs and Rhythmic charts respectively.

== Credits and personnel ==
- Produced by the Neptunes
- Co-produced by Kanye West
- Mixed and recorded by Mike Dean and Noah Goldstein
- Recorded at Tribeca Grand Hotel, New York City
- Mixed at The Mercer Hotel
- Additional vocals: Kid Cudi

== Charts ==
=== Weekly charts ===
Chart (2011–12)	Peak position
US Billboard Hot 100	69
US Hot R&B/Hip-Hop Songs (Billboard)	14
US Hot Rap Songs (Billboard)	13
US Rhythmic Airplay (Billboard)	17

=== Year-end charts ===
Chart (2012)	Position
US Hot R&B/Hip-Hop Songs (Billboard)	60
US Hot Rap Songs (Billboard)	42

== Certifications ==
Region	Certification	Certified units/sales
New Zealand (RMNZ)	Gold	15,000^{‡}
United Kingdom (BPI)	Silver	200,000^{‡}
United States (RIAA)	Platinum	1,000,000^{‡}
^{‡} Sales+streaming figures based on certification alone.
