= Love Never Dies (Back for the First Time) =

Single by Caspa & Mr Hudson
- Released: 10 August 2010
- Recorded: 2010
- Genre: Dubstep
- Length: 3:32
- Label: Sub Soldiers
- Songwriter(s): Gary McCann; Ben McIldowie; Dwayne Marsh
- Producer(s): Caspa

Caspa singles chronology
"Terminator" (2010)	"Love Never Dies" (2010)	"Neck Snappah" (2011)

Mr Hudson singles chronology
"Playing with Fire" (2010)	"Love Never Dies (Back for the First Time)" (2010)	"Why I Love You" (2011)

"Love Never Dies (Back for the First Time)" is a song performed by British dubstep producer Caspa and singer-songwriter Mr Hudson. It was released on 16 August 2010 as a digital download in the United Kingdom. It peaked to number 42 on the UK Singles Chart. The song also features and was co-produced by D1, who was only credited in the original instrumental track.

== Music video ==
A music video to accompany the release of "Love Never Dies (Back for the First Time)" was first released onto YouTube on 12 August 2010 at a total length of three minutes and thirty-three seconds.

== Track listing ==
Digital download
No.	Title	Length
1.	"Love Never Dies (Back for the First Time)" (with Mr Hudson)	3:32
2.	"Back for the First Time" (Instrumental) (featuring D1)	4:37
3.	"Back for the First Time" (Instrumental Radio Edit) (featuring D1)	3:01
4.	"Geordie Racer" (featuring Subscape)	4:37

== Chart performance ==
Chart (2010)	Peak position
UK Singles (The Official Charts Company)	42

== Release history ==
Region	Date	Format	Label
United Kingdom	16 August 2010	Digital download	Sub Soldiers
