= Too Late Too Late =

"Too Late, Too Late"

Single by Mr Hudson and the Library

from the album A Tale of Two Cities
- B-side: "Bread + Roses"
- Released: 19 February 2007
- Recorded: 2007
- Genre: Reggae fusion
- Length: 3:09
- Label: Mercury

Mr Hudson and the Library singles chronology
| "Too Late, Too Late" (2007) | "There Will Be Tears" (2008) |

"Too Late, Too Late" is the debut single by British band Mr Hudson and the Library, from their debut album A Tale of Two Cities. It features brass by the Blackjack Horns, Nik Carter on sax, Jack Birchwood on trumpet and Steven Fuller on trombone.

It was featured in the film Mr. Bean's Holiday and the video game U-Sing.

== Track listing ==
UK CD single

1. "Too Late, Too Late" - 3:09
2. "Bread + Roses" - 3:34

== Chart positions ==
| Chart (2007) | Peak position |
|---|---|
| UK Singles Chart | 53 |
