= Why I Love You (Jay-Z and Kanye West song) =

Single by Kanye West and Jay-Z featuring Mr. Hudson

from the album Watch the Throne
- Released: September 13, 2011
- Recorded: 2011
- Genre: Pop rap
- Length: 3:21
- Label: Roc-A-Fella; Roc Nation; Def Jam
- Songwriters: Kanye West; Mike Dean; Shawn Carter; Philippe Cerboneschi; Hubert Blanc-Francard; Tony Camillo; Mary Sawyer
- Producers: Kanye West; Mike Dean

Jay-Z singles chronology
"Niggas in Paris" (2011)	"Why I Love You" (2011)	"Gotta Have It" (2011)

Kanye West singles chronology
"Niggas in Paris" (2011)	"Why I Love You" (2011)	"Gotta Have It" (2011)

Mr Hudson singles chronology
"Love Never Dies (Back for the First Time)" (2010)	"Why I Love You" (2011)	"Charge" (2012)

"Why I Love You" is a song by American rappers Kanye West and Jay-Z from their collaborative studio album, Watch the Throne (2011). The song features pop musician Mr. Hudson who is signed to West's GOOD Music label. "Why I Love You" heavily samples French house duo Cassius' 2010 single "I <3 U So", which itself is based upon a sample from the original 1971 version of "I Feel a Song (In My Heart)" by Sandra Richardson. The song almost entirely features Jay-Z rapping and only contains a few lines provided by West. Lyrically, the song is about the people who have stood in the way of Jay-Z throughout the year and expresses themes of victory and anger. The song received generally positive reviews from music critics, who normally praised the production.

The song was released as the fifth single from Watch the Throne on September 13, 2011. However, the song was only released outside the US. The song became a top 40 single on the UK R&B Chart, in Iceland and in Belgium. Kanye and Jay performed the song at all the stops on their 2011 Watch the Throne Tour.

== Background ==
Kanye West and Jay-Z are both American rappers who have collaborated on several tracks together. In 2010, they began production and recording on a collaborative record Watch the Throne. The track features Mr. Hudson, who is signed to West's GOOD Music label, singing an interpolation of Cassius's track "I <3 U So". Mike Dean and West handled the production of the song. On an initial version of the album's tracklist given out by music insider blog The DOTR, the song was titled "Why I Love You (Guilt Trip)". The "Guilt Trip" section of the track ended up being cut from the album and released as a standalone song on West's 2013 album Yeezus, with no contributions from Jay-Z. Despite the final version not having Jay-Z on it, GOOD Music-signed producer S1, who has credits on the final version of "Guilt Trip", confirmed Jay-Z did record vocals for the track, but that they were more of a freestyle than a finished product.

The artwork for "Why I Love You" features the French flag with a black third substituted for blue and is exactly the same cover used for Kanye West and Jay-Z's song "Niggas in Paris", which was sent to rhythmic radio simultaneously with "Why I Love You" on September 13, 2011. The track was performed by West and Jay on their Watch the Throne Tour. It was released as a single in the United Kingdom on November 28, 2011.

== Composition ==
"Why I Love You"
A 19 second sample of "Why I Love You", which features Kanye West and Jay-Z's trading verses during the ending of the song.

The track contains a "sledgehammer beat" which is "built around French house duo Cassius' 2010 single "I <3 U So". West, who co-produced the track, "continues in the sonic vein he introduced in My Beautiful Dark Twisted Fantasy, lacing the songs with rock dynamics, layering his beats with eerie vocal chorales, piling on proggy flourishes." "Slashing violin parts" come in on the bridge before the song ends abruptly.

Lyrically the song is about "Jay's dismay at past crewmates' betrayals." The track features lines such as "Caesar didn't see it, so he ceased to exist / So the nigga that killed him had keys to his shit" which have been interpreted as insults towards artists such as Dame Dash, Beanie Sigel and Wiz Khalifa. The song "revisits" the split-up of Roc-A-Fella Records and has Jay-Z lamenting betrayal and how his past protégés failed to maintain without him. The track makes the "trendentious point that being Shawn Carter or Kanye West can have its downsides."

== Critical reception ==
"Why I Love You" received mostly positive reviews from music critics. Rob Harvilla of Spin commented that "Why I Love You" closes out the album proper with a monster Cassius-lifted chorus." Alexis Petridis of The Guardian stated that the song is "pure pop aggrandisement", musing that "this rather enjoyable piece of maximalism feels quite at home on an album writ so large, both in sound and verse, that a planetarium was deemed the only fitting venue for its first playback." Craig Jenkins of Prefix wrote that "Mike Dean's titanic, Cassius-sampling "Why I Love You" slowly peels layers off its stuffy largess to reveal the gorgeous string accompaniment underfoot. Kanye and his team are still trafficking in proggy, kitchen-sink experimentation, and Kanye's transformation into rap's own ELO is nearly complete." Entertainment Weekly's Kyle Anderson was less enthusiastic about the track, writing that "Everything falls apart on the album-closing "Why I Love You," which cranks up West's love of prog-rock bombast so much that it sounds like guest crooner Mr Hudson is trying to sing the hook over a poorly recorded bootleg of a Muse concert."

== Chart performance ==
"Why I Love You" debuted on various charts globally on the week of the album's release. In the UK, the song reached a peak of 87 on the Singles Chart and 27 on the R&B Chart. In South Korea, the track charted at position 94. The song became a top 40 single in both Iceland and Belgium. It also charted in France at number 56, and in Switzerland at 52.

== Charts ==
Chart (2011)	Peak position
Belgium (Ultratip Wallonia)	14
France (SNEP)	56
Iceland (Lagalistinn)	30
Swiss Music Charts	52
South Korean Gaon Chart	94
UK Singles (Official Charts Company)	87
UK R&B (Official Charts Company)	24
US R&B/Hip-Hop Digital Song Sales (Billboard)	50

== Certifications ==
Certification for "Why I Love You"
Region	Certification	Certified units/sales
New Zealand (RMNZ)	Gold	15,000^{‡}
United Kingdom (BPI)	Silver	200,000^{‡}
^{‡} Sales+streaming figures based on certification alone.

== Credits and personnel ==
- Produced by Mike Dean and Kanye West
- Co-produced by Anthony Kilhoffer
- Recorded by Noah Goldstein (assisted by Mat Arnold) at Real World Studios and Barford Estate, Sydney
- Mixed by Anthony Kilhoffer and Mike Dean at (The Mercer) Hotel, New York
- Cello: Chris "Hitchcock" Chorney
- Cello arrangement: Mike Dean
