= Robin French =

English television writer

- Born: Robin Edward Mackender French; 1978 (age 47–48); Birmingham, England
- Occupations: Playwright, writer

Robin French (born 1978) is an English playwright, film and television writer and songwriter.

== Background ==
French was born in Birmingham. His father is English, his mother is from Barbados. French studied modern and medieval languages at Selwyn College, Cambridge, where he graduated with first-class honours in 2001. While at Cambridge he was active in the Cambridge Footlights and won two play-writing competitions.

== Career ==
=== Television ===
French's sitcom Cuckoo, co-created and co-written with Kieron Quirke started to air on BBC Three and BBC One in 2012, with the second series in 2014 and the third series in 2016. The series launch became BBC Three's most-watched comedy launch, beating the record set by Bad Education which debuted the previous month. Greg Davies was nominated for a BAFTA for Best Male Performance in a Comedy Programme, for his role in Cuckoo. At the British Comedy Awards, Cuckoo was nominated for Best New Comedy Programme and Greg Davies was nominated for Best TV Comedy Actor. Cuckoo stars: Andy Samberg (first series only), Greg Davies, Taylor Lautner (second series onwards), Helen Baxendale, Esther Smith (second series onwards), Tyger Drew-Honey and Tamla Kari (first series only).

French has twice been awarded the title of Hotshot (representing UK writing) by Broadcast magazine (2006 and 2008). He was writer and script editor for two series of BBC's Man Stroke Woman starring Nick Frost, Nicholas Burns (actor), Amanda Abbington and Daisy Haggard. He was co-creator of (ABC Family) US sitcom Roommates, and co-creator and co-writer of ITV2's mystery dramedy Trinity starring Charles Dance and Claire Skinner. In 2026, he co-wrote the seventh episode of Series 15 of BBC crime drama series Death in Paradise, alongside Alexandra Carruthers.

=== Film ===
French's film Crocodile, directed by Gaelle Denis, was selected for Cannes Critics’ Week 2014 and won the Canal Plus Award at the 2014 Cannes Film Festival. It was nominated by BIFA for Best British Short 2014. It was winner of the Signis Prize at Guanajuato International Film Festival, Mexico 2014. It was winner of the Channel 4 Best Short Film Award at Encounters Short Film and Animation Festival 2014

French's short film Groove is in the Heart, directed by Bijan Sheibani, was produced by The Guardian and The Royal Court Theatre. It was subsequently selected as part of the BFI film season 2015.

French is currently writing a film about David Bowie and Iggy Pop's time in Berlin.

=== Theatre ===
French is currently writer in residence at the Birmingham Repertory Theatre. His version of Henrik Ibsen's Hedda Gabler, "Heather Gardner", was produced by Birmingham Repertory Theatre in 2013. French's first play, Bear Hug, won the Royal Court Theatre Young Writers Programme and was subsequently produced at the theatre. It has since had productions in Italy, Germany, Ireland and Poland. His second play, Gilbert is Dead performed at Hoxton Hall, London, in November 2009. His play for young people The Red Helicopter was performed at the Almeida theatre, London, in August 2010. The Guardian listed French as one of the UK's "young stars in the ascendant" in 2005.

French's play Crooked Dances, inspired by the music of Erik Satie, played at The Other Place, Stratford-upon-Avon, in 2019.

=== Music ===
French spent several years as the bassist of UK band Mr Hudson and the Library. French played under the alias Maps Huxley, and co-wrote the song "One Specific Thing" from the album A Tale of Two Cities. He left the band to pursue writing in September 2007. He co-wrote the opening song of Pixie Lott's latest album Young Foolish Happy with Mr Hudson, Cathy Dennis and Pixie Lott.
