= Romeo Johnson =

American songwriter

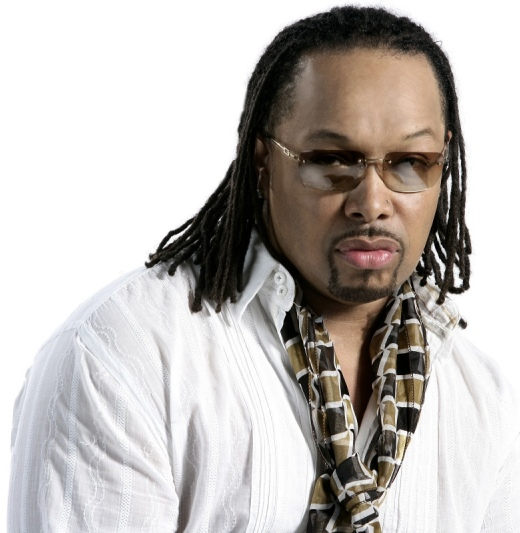
- Johnson in 2009

Background information
- Origin: Chattanooga, Tennessee, U.S.
- Genres: R&B, soul
- Years active: 1987–present
- Website: www.romeojohnson.com

Romeo Johnson is an American singer-songwriter and vocal coach. A Chattanooga, Tennessee native, Johnson attended Brainerd High School, for Music Theory, Conducting/Arranging, and Stage Band. He later attended The University of Tennessee, and studied Theater, Voice, and Dance.

== Television ==
In 2009, Johnson could be seen in two reality TV shows on MTV as the Vocal Director and Personal Vocal Coach for Sean P. Diddy Combs in "Making His Band" and the Vocal Coach and background section leader on P. Diddy's "StarMaker". Johnson helped select and vocally train Diddy's 14 aspiring singers over the course of 10 weeks. On October 26, 2009, the day after the winner was chosen, new artist for Bad Boy Records, Liz Davis stated that Johnson "had the best techniques".

== Live performances ==
Johnson began his touring career with Vesta Williams, later Johnson became a background vocalist and dancer for Jody Watley. He also played bass guitar and bass synthesizer for Sheena Easton. Johnson also toured with Millie Jackson, Rahsaan Patterson, Rufus, Teddy Riley & GUY (section leader/background vocalist), Blackstreet, Patti Austin, and Michael Jackson. In 1993, Johnson sang background vocals with Stacy Campbell and Lisa Taylor for Janet Jackson for her second worldwide tour.

In 2007-2008, Johnson was a vocalist and background section leader for Queen Latifah. His performance was mentioned by the Santa Barbara Review in an article written on November 24, 2007 by Charles Donelan stating "In this setting, early Mary J. Blige counts as a classic, and it was her song "Real Love" that provided the night's high point, an amazing succession of vocal performances by Latifah, her two female backup singers, and a wonderful musician and rip-roaring male vocalist who goes by Romeo."

In between touring, Johnson worked as a session vocalist on sound recordings with Kanye West's 808's & Heartbreak "Say You Will", Ice Cube for the CD, Essentials as a background vocalist, Snoop Dogg "Ego Trippin" and "Can't Say Goodbye", Stevie Wonder "Don't Hurt My Baby", Smashmouth "More Bounce", Nate Dogg (seven tracks on an upcoming album), Xzibit "Symphony in X Major", Macy Gray "Time of My Life", Mack 10 "Hate In Your Eyes", George Howard "I Apologize", James Ingram "Natural Man", Jennifer Holliday "Love Stories" and "Raise The Roof".

== Movie soundtracks and TV spots ==
Johnson has been on movie soundtracks such as The Cookout soundtrack as lead vocals on "The Closer I Get To You" and the "Radio" movie soundtrack as background vocals for India.Arie. Johnson's career also includes live TV performances, numerous award shows and commercial radio jingles which include Los Angeles' HOT 92 JAMZ. His voice is featured on a national commercial jingle airing for "Outlast" a CoverGirl Product featuring Queen Latifah.
