= Mr Hudson =

English musician from Birmingham

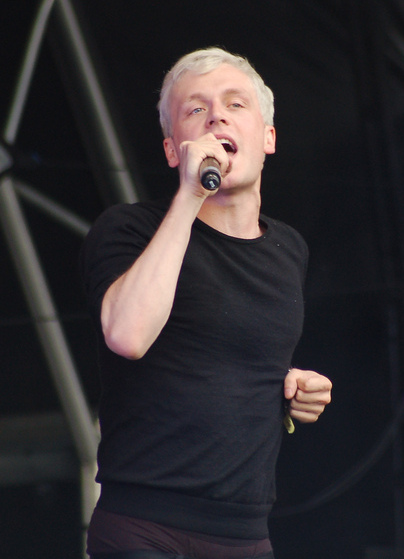
- Mr Hudson performing at Lovebox Weekender in London, 2009

Background information
- Born: Benjamin Hudson McIldowie
- Origin: Birmingham, England
- Genres: R&B; pop; rock; new wave; alternative hip-hop
- Occupations: Singer; songwriter; record producer
- Instruments: Vocals; guitar; piano
- Years active: 2006–present
- Label: Mercury
- Member of: Mr Hudson and the Library
- Website: mrhudson.com

Benjamin Hudson McIldowie, better known by his stage name Mr Hudson, is a English singer, songwriter, and record producer from Birmingham. He was the lead vocalist of the band Mr Hudson and the Library, and signed with American rapper Kanye West's record label, GOOD Music through a joint venture with Mercury Records as a solo act two years later. He is best known for his guest performance on West's 2009 single, "Paranoid", as well as for his songwriting contributions to "Say You Will" and "Street Lights", and "Heartless"; all four appeared on West's fourth album, 808s & Heartbreak (2008).

That same year, Hudson guest performed on Jay-Z's 2010 single "Young Forever", which peaked within the top ten of both the US Billboard Hot 100 and UK Singles Chart. His debut studio album, Straight No Chaser (2009) entered the UK Albums Chart at number 25 and the Scottish Albums Charts at number 33; its single, "Supernova" (featuring Kanye West) peaked at number two on the UK Singles Chart. Hudson featured on Jay-Z and Kanye West's album Watch The Throne (2011), appearing on "Why I Love You".

Hudson then began writing and producing for other acts including Paloma Faith and Duran Duran on the 2014 album Paper Gods. In 2016, Hudson collaborated with JP Cooper to write "September Song" and "She's on My Mind". Other Hudson collaborations include those with Future and Miley Cyrus, Vic Mensa and DJ Snake. He won a Grammy Award for his work on John Legend's 2020 album Bigger Love. He co-wrote and co-produced Sofia Isella's third EP, Something is a Shell, which was released 17 April 2026.

== Life and career ==
=== 1979–2006: Early life and career beginnings ===
Born in Birmingham, Hudson grew up in the Handsworth area of the city.

Before Mr Hudson formed 'Mr Hudson and the Library' he was in 'Mansize', 'The Hudson Sound' and 'Phoenix Green'. 'The Hudson Sound' and 'Phoenix Green' featured Ali Forbes, Jarvy Moss, Ben Westwood and Mr Hudson's brother Jon McIldowie. They enjoyed considerable success in the Birmingham area and elsewhere with a regular spot at Ronnie Scott's in Birmingham. 'Mansize' featured later collaborator Robin French.

=== 2006–08: The Library and A Tale of Two Cities ===
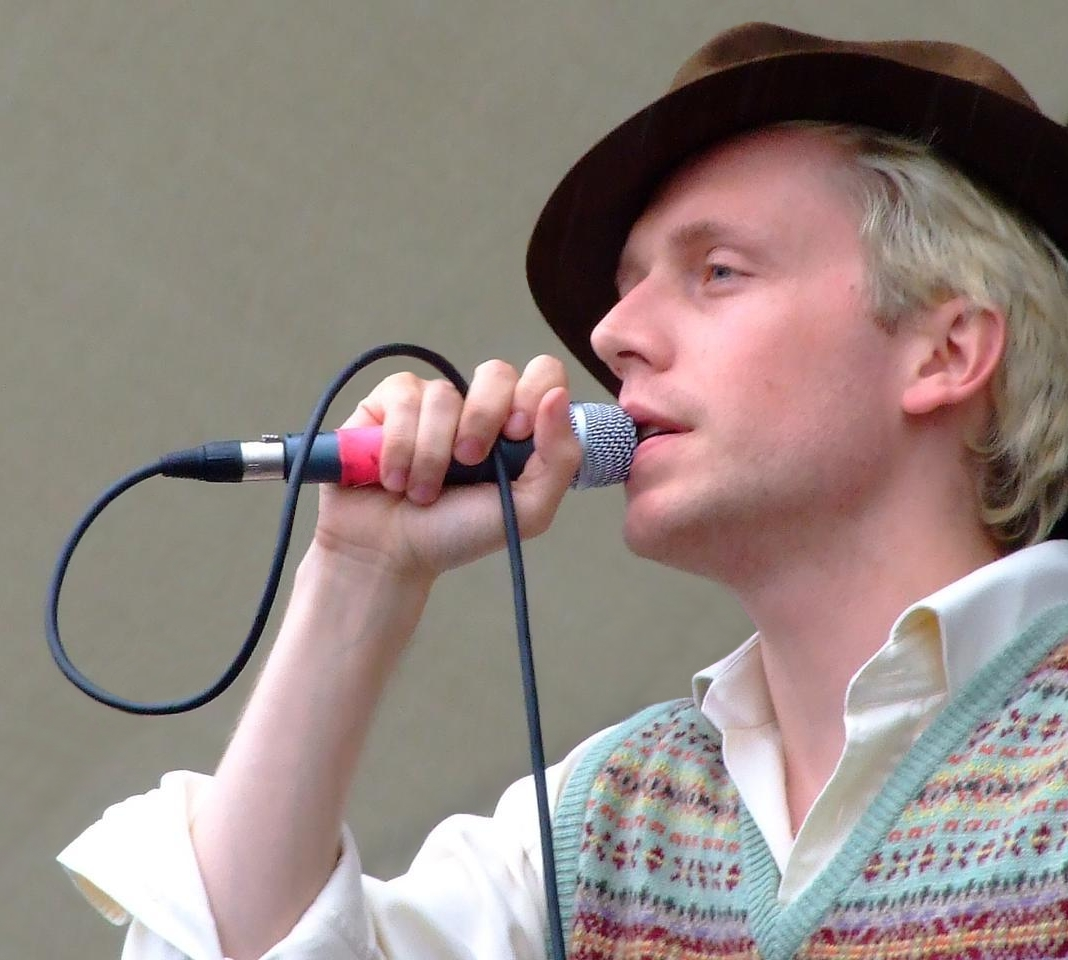
Performing with Mr. Hudson and The Library in July 2007

Hudson embarked on his music career when he formed Mr Hudson and the Library, composed of Maps Huxley aka Robin French (bass), Wilkie Wilkinson (drums), Joy Joseph (steel drums, vocals) and Torville Jones (piano). The first result, an EP entitled Bread & Roses, came out via Deal Real in October 2006. The group toured with Amy Winehouse in early 2007 in support of their debut album, A Tale of Two Cities, released through Deal Real/Mercury. Mr. Hudson was first featured on Later with Jools Holland on 8 December 2006.

The production on the band's debut album uses acoustic guitar interspersed with piano, backing vocals and bass guitar, steelpan, electric drums and unusual rhythm patterns. Two of the tracks from A Tale of Two Cities are covers; "On the Street Where You Live", is a cover of a number from the musical My Fair Lady and "Everything Happens to Me" was popularised by Frank Sinatra and Chet Baker.

In 2007, Mr Hudson and the Library embarked on a tour through twelve British libraries as part of the 'Get It Loud' initiative, and also supported Amy Winehouse on her tour, along with Paolo Nutini, Mika and Groove Armada. During the summer of 2007 they appeared at several UK festivals, including Glastonbury, T in the Park, The Big Chill, V Festival, Godiva Festival, and Bestival. In October 2007, the band played at the Millennium Stadium in Cardiff in support of The Police. They also supported Kanye West on his Europe leg of his Glow in the Dark Tour, performing in Dublin, Belfast and other European cities.

In 2008, Mr. Hudson began recording as a solo artist. Although the name 'The Library' was no longer used, these musicians formed his backing band for live performances.

=== 2009–12: Solo career, breakthrough and Straight No Chaser ===
Sessions for Straight No Chaser initially started at Gizzard Studios in Bow, East London. Ed Deegan who had previously worked at Toe Rag Studios near by was acting as engineer, but Mr. Hudson received an offer from Kanye West to produce his album. Mr. Hudson appears on Kanye West's fourth album, 808s & Heartbreak featured on "Paranoid". He also co-produced "Street Lights" as well as supplying additional vocals on "Say You Will" and "Amazing". Kanye West has stated: "I believe Mr. Hudson has the potential to be bigger than me, to be one of the most important artists of his generation". The single Supernova was premiered on 13 May 2009 on Zane Lowe's BBC Radio 1 show and then released on 19 July 2009. It debuted at Number 2 in the UK singles chart on 26 July 2009. Calvin Harris remixed the track.

Mr Hudson's new album – Straight No Chaser was released on 4 August 2009 (via GOOD Music and Mercury Records), executive produced by Kanye West. "I wanted to make a mainstream record, not structured or ornate," he explains. "The first album feels like an Escher drawing, all these layers and you don't know where you're going at any point. The way the songs are written and produced on this one is much more direct. It's not trying to reinvent the wheel. It's straight, no chaser."[10] In an interview, he was asked to describe the album: "My mission statement was to make a pop record, but not a throwaway pop record. My heroes are people like Bowie and Prince and Damon Albarn. I didn't want to do anything niche. Kanye threw down the gauntlet. He said, 'Let's see if we can make you a popstar'. I was like 'Let's have a go!'. It's a bit more widescreen, a bit more punchy, but the eclecticism of the first record's still there. There's a tune where I'm a cross between Deliverance and Sade". In 2009, Hudson guested on "Playing with Fire" by N-Dubz.

In the autumn of 2009, he supported Calvin Harris on his UK tour. Mr. Hudson's headline tour to support the album Straight No Chaser was in October 2009. Before the year was out, Hudson made a featured appearance on Jay-Z's The Blueprint 3, the track, "Young Forever", was a reworking of Alphaville's 1984 song "Forever Young". In May 2010 Mr. Hudson embarked on a sold out national UK tour, with supporting Jay Z in Birmingham & Manchester arena shows plus Isle of Wight & Wireless festivals. In 2010, Mr. Hudson collaborated with British dubstep artist Caspa on the track "Love Never Dies (Back for the First Time)", which is a new version of a previous Caspa track known simply as "Back for the First Time". Rapper Nero appeared on the remix. On 29 July it was named by BBC Radio 1 DJ Zane Lowe as his Hottest Record in the World Today. Mr. Hudson was featured on Jay-Z and Kanye West's album Watch the Throne (2011), appearing on "Why I Love You". In 2012, Hudson was featured on the UK Top 10 single "Charge", by Sway.

=== 2013–2017: Writing and Production ===
In March 2013, Mr. Hudson debuted the new single "Fred Astaire" via SoundCloud. "Fred Astaire" would later be released as a commercial single in August of the same year, with accompanying video directed by prominent English portrait and fashion photographer Rankin and photographer Vicky Lawton. Since then he has released additional tracks taken from the album: "Move" with Rankin shooting the video exclusively for Hunger TV, in December 2013 and "Step into The Shadows" featuring Idris Elba in May 2014.

In November, Epic Records recording artist Future released the track "Real and True" featuring Miley Cyrus & Mr. Hudson in the US. The track was co written by Mr. Hudson with the video shot by photographer Rankin. December 2013 saw the release of Rebecca Ferguson's album entitled Freedom with the track "Beautiful Design" which Mr. Hudson co wrote and produced. 2014 saw the release of Idris Elba's Idris Elba presents Mi Mandela on which Hudson features and co-produced. The same year Hudson collaborated with Paloma Faith on the track "Take Me" on her third studio album A Perfect Contradiction.

Hudson spent most of 2014 writing and producing Paper Gods by Duran Duran, released 11 September 2015. Lead singer Simon le Bon had this to say of Hudson's involvement: "Him coming on board was a very crucial stage actually, it glued it all together. Before we had a bunch of different songs and he brought it together and gave it a direction. He also gave us the confidence to leave each other's space, and this is the first time we have got this on an album." In October 2015, Hudson released a single titled, "Dancing Thru It", followed by the critically acclaimed "Hey You".

On 5 August 2016, his collaboration which he co-write & featured with DJ Snake, "Here Comes the Night" from Snake's debut album Encore, was released. The acoustic version was released on 7 April in the remix package 16 September 2016, Hudson's co-write for JP Cooper's "September Song" was released. On 8 January 2017, he appeared as a special guest at the Celebrating David Bowie concert at the O2 Brixton Academy with Gary Oldman & Mike Garson, singing a rendition of Bowie's "Starman". Hudson sang with Bowie's band, Mike Garson, Gail Ann Dorsey, Earl Slick and more for the 'Celebrating David Bowie' shows in London, New York and Los Angeles. He has continued to tour with the line up in 2018 in the UK, Europe and the USA.

Hudson's features and co-writes in 2017 include with Vic Mensa "Almost There" for Mensa's Masterpiece EP, "She's on My Mind" by JP Cooper, "Beatnik Trip" by Gin Wigmore and Bearson "Cold War". Hudson also released two of his own tracks late in 2017. "Can't Forget You" released on 29 September and "Coldplay" featuring Vic Mensa, world premiered on 5 December with Zane Lowe on Beats1 Radio.

=== 2018–2019: Writing, production and When the Machine Stops ===
Mr. Hudson's co-write with Alexander DeLeon 'Zombie Love' was released on 30 March followed by his track with Janelle Monáe feat Zoe Kravitz "Screwed" on 27 April, taken from the album Dirty Computer. Mr. Hudson appeared on Kanye West and Kid Cudi's collaboration album "Kids See Ghosts" where he sang the outro to the final song, "Cudi Montage". Hudson's co-write for Jonas Blue featuring Joe Jonas "I See Love" was released 29 June for the Hotel Transylvania 3 soundtrack. On 10 August Jake Shears' debut solo album was released, on which Hudson co-wrote the tracks "Clothes Off", "Mississippi Delta", and "Big Bushy Mustache". Hudson co-wrote and featured on 'Deserve It' from Vic Mensa's Hooligans EP, released on 13 December followed by his co-write with JP Cooper 'Cheerleader' on 14 December. Faustix's single "Thorns" released on 29 March by Big Beat/Atlantic was co-written by Hudson.

On 19 April 2019 Hudson revealed his first new original song in 10 years, titled "Antidote", written and produced with Jon Hume. Hudson's co-write with Hopium, "I Forget My Name", was released on 17 May followed by Hudson's second solo single "Chicago" featuring Vic Mensa. He later confirmed that both "Antidote" and "Chicago" would feature on his album When the Machine Stops, released 21 June 2019. In addition to Mensa, When the Machine Stops also features Schae, Taylor Bennett, Josh Dean, Petite Noir, and Goody Grace. In an interview with Spindle Magazine, Hudson described his influences in making the album as:

My inspirations are often non-musical. Movies like Blade Runner. TV shows like Black Mirror. And of course literature in the form of E.M. Forster's "The Machine Stops". I tend to listen to older music for inspo. I'm much more likely to be listening to Chet Baker or Nat King Cole or The Ink Spot

On 28 May 2019, Taylor Bennett's album The American Reject was released featuring a Hudson co-write and feature on the track "I Miss You". On 28 June, Hudson's co-write with Lontalius "Make My Dreams Come True" was released. Hudson's co-write with Samm Henshaw and DJ Khalil "Rise" is featured on the Godfather of Harlem soundtrack curated by Swizz Beatz.

=== 2020–present: Recent works ===
On 21 February 2020 JP Cooper's "Bits & Pieces" was released, co-written and produced by Hudson. June 2020 saw Hudson's writing and production work featured on John Legend's album Bigger Love for track "Never Break". Later on 26 June "Too Close", a song Hudson co-wrote with JP Cooper, was released as part of the EP also titled Too Close which also includes "Bits & Pieces". In December 2020 Taylor Bennett released his track "Don't Wait Up" featuring and co-written by Mr Hudson. 26 February 2021 Hudson's production and co-write with Goody Grace "21 & Jaded" was released. In March 2021 Hudson's work with John Legend on "Never Break" received a Grammy Award for Best R&B album. On 23 April 2021 Charlotte Cardin released "Je Quitte" which was co-written and produced by Hudson and in May 2022 won multiple Juno awards and reached platinum sales in Canada. In June 2021 San Holo released the album BB U OK? with the track "The Great Clown Pagliacci" sampling Hudson's "Closing Time". 13 May 2022 saw the release of Johan Lenox's interlude track "Burning Sky" co-written & featuring Hudson from the album WDYWTBWYGU.

Releases in 2022 for Hudson include The 1975 "About You" from the album Being Funny in a Foreign Language, Lloyiso "Run", Lenii "Already Famous", Henry Wagons "Cover My Eyes", Ampersounds (Fred Falke and Zen Freeman) "Nightdrive", Harry Hudson EP A Deer in Headlights, GuiltyBeatz "Universe", and Zachary Knowles "Wrong Side" Hudson's first release of 2023 was Neve's track "Should Have Been Us" followed in April by his co-write & feature "Memories" with French duo Picard Brothers. Also in April, Renao's track "Blind" featured Hudson as a co-writer, and in August, "Looping" with Charlotte Cardin was released from her Juno Award-winning album 99 nights.

In October 2023 Duran Duran released their 16th album Danse Macabre. Hudson co-wrote & produced Danse Macabre and Confessions In The Afterlife In 2024 Hudson's collaborations included releases with Stefflon Don "Dem Evil" from the album Island 54, Beth Morgan's "Shy Love" and Sofia Isella's "Sex Concept" from the EP I Can Be Your Mother. Later that same year Hudson featured on and co-wrote "Without Words", his second release with San Holo, in July "Waiting On A Blue Sky" with JP Cooper, and "Waiting Room" with Rowan Drake. In 2025, Hudson collaborated with Sofia Isella on her I’m camera. EP with the tracks, "Muse", "Dog’s Dinner", "Crowd Caffeine", "Man Made", and "Orchestrated, Wet, Verboten".

Later in 2025 his collaborations with Sofia Isella included the singles, "Out In The Garden" and "Above The Neck".

Hudson also worked with JP Cooper on the singles, "Talking To Strangers" and "Summer of Love" from his upcoming album. Some other releases include Umi's "10am", Akira Kosemura's "Always You", and Jon Wiilde's "One Man Band". In late January 2026, Sofia Isella released "Numbers 31:17-18", a co-production with Hudson. February of the same year JP Cooper's album Just a Few Folk was released, featuring five Hudson co-writes: "Intro", "Waiting On a Blue Sky", "Summer of Love", "You Give Me Life" and "The Greatest Story Ever Told".

== Discography ==
- Straight No Chaser (2009)
- Never Grow Up (with Rosie Oddie, as BIGkids) (2012)
- When the Machine Stops (2019)

== Awards and nominations ==
- Q Awards 2009
  - Q awards – Best Breakthrough Act – Won
- MOBO Awards 2009
  - Best UK Act – Nominated
  - Best Video "Supernova" – Nominated
- UMA Awards UK & France 2009
  - Best Collaboration ft Kanye West – "Supernova" – Nominated
  - Best Newcomer – Nominated
  - Best R&B Act – Nominated
- MOBO Awards 2010
  - Best Song "Playing with Fire" – Won
