= Straight No Chaser (Mr Hudson album) =

Studio album by Mr Hudson
- Released: 19 October 2009
- Recorded: 2008–2009
- Genres: Synth-pop; new wave; alternative R&B; electronic
- Length: 44:16
- Labels: GOOD; Mercury
- Producers: Mr Hudson; Dave McCracken; The Bullitts; Andrew Savours; Steve Robson

Mr Hudson chronology
Straight No Chaser (2009)	When the Machine Stops (2019)

Singles from Straight No Chaser
- 1. "There Will Be Tears" Released: 2008; 2. "Supernova" Released: 14 July 2009; 3. "White Lies" Released: 12 October 2009; 4. "Anyone But Him" Released: November 2010

Professional ratings
Aggregate scores
Source	Rating
Metacritic	63/100
Review scores
Source	Rating
AllMusic	4/5 stars
BBC	favourable
Digital Spy	4/5 stars
Drowned in Sound	8/10
NME	1/5 stars

Straight No Chaser is the second overall album by British pop musician Mr Hudson and his first as a solo artist. It is the follow-up to the last album released with his band Mr Hudson and the Library entitled A Tale of Two Cities. Straight No Chaser was released in the UK on 19 October 2009. It was released in the United States on 29 June 2010.

== Background ==
Sessions first started at Gizzard Studios in Bow, East London, with the album being engineered by Ed Deegan, however the Library (Mr Hudson's backing band) were soon fired and tapes were shelved when Mr Hudson was then flown to the Bahamas to record a new album with Kanye West. In an interview, singer Ben Hudson was asked to describe the album: "My mission statement was to make a pop record, but not a throwaway pop record. My heroes are people like Bowie and Prince and Damon Albarn. I didn't want to do anything niche. Kanye threw down the gauntlet. He said, 'Let's see if we can make you a popstar'. I was like 'Let's have a go!'. It's a bit more widescreen, a bit more punchy, but the eclecticism of the first record's still there. There's a tune where I'm a cross between Deliverance and Sade".

== Singles ==
- "There Will Be Tears" was the first single from Straight No Chaser, but failed to attract the attention of the media, something only "Supernova" achieved in chart success.
- "Supernova" was the second single from Straight No Chaser. The single features American artist Kanye West, usually a rapper, as a singer on this track. It debuted at number 2 on the UK Singles Chart, behind the number-one single "Beat Again" by JLS.
- "White Lies" was the third single from Straight No Chaser. The song was released on 12 October 2009 in the United Kingdom and reached number 20 on the UK Singles Chart.
- "Anyone But Him" was the fourth single from Straight No Chaser.

== Track listing ==
Straight No Chaser track listing
No.	Title	Writer(s)	Producer(s)	Length
1.	"Supernova" (featuring Kanye West)	Benjamin McIldowie; Kanye West	Dave McCracken; West (add.)	3:13
2.	"White Lies"	McIldowie; Kaywan Qazzaz; Sef Naqui	McCracken	3:11
3.	"Knew We Were Trouble"	McIldowie; Carl Wilkinson	Mr Hudson	3:15
4.	"Straight No Chaser"	McIldowie; Jeymes Samuel	The Bullitts; Mr Hudson (add.)	3:23
5.	"Learning to Live"	McIldowie	Mr Hudson, Andrew Savours	4:18
6.	"Instant Messenger"	McIldowie	Mr Hudson	3:44
7.	"There Will Be Tears"	McIldowie	Mr Hudson	3:47
8.	"Stiff Upper Lip"	McIldowie; Martin Brammer; Steve Robson	Mr Hudson; Steve Robson	2:52
9.	"Central Park"	McIldowie	Mr Hudson	2:53
10.	"Anyone But Him" (featuring Kanye West)	McIldowie; West	Mr Hudson	3:10
11.	"Everything Is Broken" (featuring Kid Cudi)	McIldowie; Samuel; Scott Mescudi	The Bullitts; Mr Hudson (add.)	2:44
12.	"Lift Your Head" (available only in the UK)	McIldowie	Mr Hudson	3:08
13.	"Time"	McIldowie; Samuel	Mr Hudson	3:58
Total length:				44:16

iTunes edition bonus track
No.	Title	Writer(s)	Producer(s)	Length
14.	"Supernova" (Calvin Harris Remix)	McIldowie; West; Calvin Harris	Harris	5:41
Total length:				49:57

== Personnel ==
Artists

- Mr Hudson – primary artist (all tracks)
- Kanye West – featured artist (tracks 1, 10)
- Joy Joseph – background artist (tracks 1–3, 5, 9, 12, 13)
- Sara Skeete – background artist (track 2)

Technical personnel

- Andrew Dawson – mixing (track 1)
- Manny Marroquin – mixing (tracks 1, 3, 4, 10, 13)
- Andy Savours – mixing (tracks 2, 5, 6, 8, 11, 12), recording (track 5)
- Anthony Kilhoffer – mixing (track 7)
- Catherine Marks – recording (tracks 1, 10, 11, 13)

Record producers

- Dave McCracken – production (tracks 1, 2)
- Mr Hudson – production (tracks 3, 5–10, 12, 13), additional production (tracks 4, 11)
- The Bullitts – production (tracks 4, 11)
- Andy Savours – production (track 5)
- Steve Robson – production (track 8)
- Kanye West – additional production (track 1)
- Wilkie Wilkinson – percussion (tracks 1, 2)
- Torville Jones – piano (tracks 2, 6, 12, 13), synthesizer (track 3)
- Rory Moore Jr. – organ (track 3)
- Craig Owen – strings (track 5)
- Raphael Mann – synth, acoustic guitar (track 5)

Additional personnel

- Kanye West – executive producer
- Traffic – design
- Rankin – photography (front cover)
- Colin Whitehouse – photography (inlay)
- Nabil Elderkin – photography (inside booklet
- Rachael Paley – product manager

== Charts ==
Chart performance for Straight No Chaser
Chart (2009)	Peak position
UK Albums (Official Charts)	25
Scottish Albums (Official Charts)	33
