= Supernova (Mr Hudson song) =

Single by Mr Hudson featuring Kanye West

from the album Straight No Chaser
- Released: 19 July 2009
- Genre: Synth-pop; new wave; alternative hip hop; electronic
- Length: 3:16
- Label: GOOD; Mercury
- Songwriters: Benjamin McIldowie; West
- Producers: Dave McCracken; West (co.)

Mr Hudson singles chronology
| "Paranoid" (2009) | "Supernova" (2009) | "White Lies" (2009) |

Kanye West singles chronology
| "Digital Girl" (2009) | "Supernova" (2009) | "Run This Town" (2009) |

"Supernova" is a song by British singer Mr Hudson, featuring American rapper Kanye West. It is Hudson's second single as a solo artist (after "There Will Be Tears"), and his second collaboration with West, after the single "Paranoid" (in which Hudson was the featured artist). "Supernova" was premiered on 13 May 2009, on Zane Lowe BBC Radio Show and then released through Mr Hudson's and Kanye West's blogs. The song was later remixed by Calvin Harris in a more electronic fashion. After being officially released as a single on 19 July 2009, it promptly debuted high on European charts.

== Release ==
"Supernova" was released to iTunes on 19 July 2009 after being able to pre-order throughout the previous week.

== Chart performance ==
On the Irish Singles Chart, "Supernova" debuted in the top ten, entering at number seven on the issue date of 23 July 2009. The song was the highest debut on the chart for that week. The following week it rose to number four; and it peaked at number two. It performed even better in Hudson's native United Kingdom, where it debuted at number two on the UK Singles Chart on 26 July 2009 (for the week ending date 1 August 2009)

== Music video ==
The music video for "Supernova" was shot in both London and Los Angeles, California. It was directed by French duo Jonas & François and released on 30 June 2009. It follows Mr Hudson and Kanye West in their pursuit of women, with R&B singer Estelle making a cameo appearance in the video as one of the love interests. Juxtaposed with these images is a sequence of an actual supernova, as well as a flashing light suit, featured prominently during the song's chorus.

== Track listings ==
CD single

1. "Supernova" – 3:16

UK single

1. "Supernova" – 3:13
2. "Supernova" (Calvin Harris Remix) – 5:41

== Charts ==
=== Weekly charts ===
Weekly chart performance for "Supernova"
| Chart (2009) | Peak position |
|---|---|
| Irish Singles Chart | 2 |
| Eurochart Hot 100 Singles | 9 |
| German Singles Chart | 47 |
| UK Singles Chart | 2 |
| UK R&B Chart | 2 |
| U.S. Billboard Bubbling Under Hot 100 Singles | 12 |

=== End-of-year charts ===
2009 year-end chart performance for "Supernova"
| Chart (2009) | Position |
|---|---|
| UK Singles Chart | 38 |

== Certifications and sales ==
| Region | Certification | Certified units/sales |
|---|---|---|
| United Kingdom (BPI) | Gold | 400,000^{‡} |
^{‡} Sales+streaming figures based on certification alone.

== Release history ==
Release dates and formats for "Supernova"
| Region | Date | Format | Label(s) | Ref. |
|---|---|---|---|---|
| United States | July 13, 2009 | Mainstream airplay | Island | |
