= Mr Hudson and the Library =

British music group

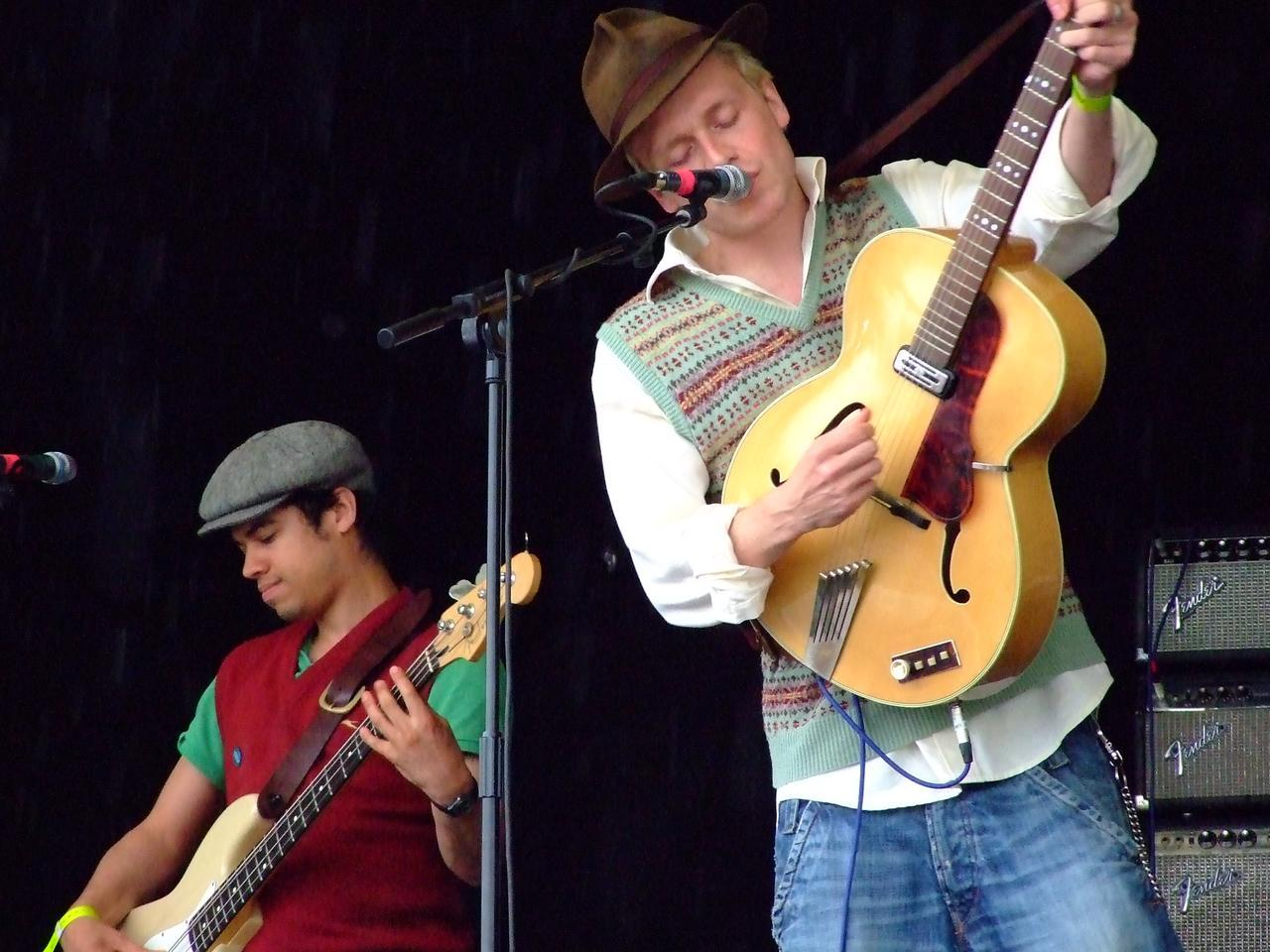
Mr Hudson and the Library performing in July 2007

Mr Hudson and the Library were a British music group active from 2006 to 2007 and composed of Mr Hudson (vocals, guitar), Joy Joseph (steelpan, percussion, vocals), Torville Jones (piano), Robin French (a.k.a. Maps Huxley) (bass) and Wilkie Wilkinson (drums). The members hailed from Birmingham and London.

Their music has been described as a fusion of old school reggae, rock and soul.

Their first EP entitled Bread & Roses was released in October 2006. This was followed by the hit single "Too Late Too Late". The band played two songs, "Too Late Too Late" and "Brave the Cold" on Later with Jools Holland on 8 December 2006.

In January 2007 the band toured a special tour of 13 UK libraries ) as part of Get It Loud In Libraries)including a date at Lancaster Library, where the support was a very young Adele

Their debut album, A Tale of Two Cities was released on 5 March 2007 on Mercury Records. The album crosses genres, combining Mr Hudson’s songwriting with hip hop-influenced drum patterns, folky acoustic guitar, reggae-influenced bass guitar, classical piano and West Indian steelpan. Two of the tracks from A Tale of Two Cities are covers; "On the Street Where You Live" from My Fair Lady and "Everything Happens to Me", as popularised by Frank Sinatra and Chet Baker.

In 2007, Mr Hudson and the Library played a number of high profile support tours, most notably on Amy Winehouse’s Back to Black tour - but have also supported Paolo Nutini, Mika and Groove Armada. They appeared at many UK festivals, including Glastonbury, T in the Park, The Big Chill, V Festival, Godiva Festival, and Bestival. On their own UK tour, they were supported by Cheap Hotel; their singer Anna Calvi went on to acclaimed solo success. In October 2007, Mr Hudson and the Library played at the Millennium Stadium in Cardiff in support of The Police. They also supported Kanye West on his Europe leg of his Glow in the Dark Tour, performing in Dublin, Belfast and other European cities.

In 2008, the band disbanded and Mr Hudson began recording as a solo artist, releasing his first solo album Straight No Chaser in 2009.
