= A Tale of Two Cities (album) =

2007 Album by Mr Hudson and the Library

Studio album by Mr Hudson and the Library
- Released: 5 March 2007
- Genres: Indie rock; reggae fusion; jazz; alternative hip hop
- Label: Mercury
- Producer: Jim Abbiss

Professional ratings
Review scores
Source	Rating
Allmusic	4/5 stars

A Tale of Two Cities is the debut and only album by British musical group Mr Hudson and the Library, released on 5 March 2007. It is named after the Charles Dickens novel of the same name.

== Track listing ==
1. "On the Street Where You Live" (Alan Jay Lerner, Frederick Loewe)
2. "Take Us Somewhere New"
3. "Too Late Too Late" (Brass by Nik Carter-Sax / Jack Birchwood-Trumpet and Steven Fuller-Trombone)
4. "Everything Happens to Me" (Tom Adair, Matt Dennis)
5. "Cover Girl"
6. "Two by Two"
7. "Bread & Roses"
8. "Ask the DJ"
9. "Picture of You"
10. "One Specific Thing" (Ben Hudson, Robin French)
11. "Ghosts"
12. "Upon The Heath/A Tale of Two Cities [Remix]"
