= 1995 New Year Honours =

British royal recognitions

The New Year Honours 1995 were appointments by most of the sixteen Commonwealth realms of Queen Elizabeth II to various orders and honours to reward and highlight good works by citizens of those countries, and honorary ones to citizens of other countries. They were announced on 31 December 1994 to celebrate the year passed and mark the beginning of 1995 in the United Kingdom, New Zealand and Cook Islands, the Bahamas, Grenada, Papua New Guinea, the Solomon Islands, Tuvalu, Saint Vincent and the Grenadines, and Belize.

The recipients of honours are displayed here as they were styled before their new honour, and arranged by honour, with classes (Knight, Knight Grand Cross, etc.) and then divisions (Military, Civil, etc.) as appropriate.

== United Kingdom ==
=== Life Peer ===
Baroness

- The Honourable Sarah Elizabeth Mary Hogg, Head of Prime Minister's Policy Unit.
- Elizabeth Margaret Smith, Widow of the Right Honourable John Smith, QC, MP.

Baron

- The Right Honourable James Arthur David Hope, Lord Justice-General of Scotland and Lord President of the Court of Session.
- The Right Honourable Robert William Brian McConnell, former Social Security Commissioner, Northern Ireland.

=== Privy Counsellor ===
- Geoffrey Denis Erskine Russell, Baron Ampthill, CBE, Deputy Speaker and formerly Chairman of Committees, House of Lords.
- Timothy John Crommelin Eggar, MP, Member of Parliament for Enfield North and Minister of State, Department of Trade and Industry.
- Michael Bruce Forsyth, MP, Member of Parliament for Stirling and Minister of State, Home Office.

=== Knight Bachelor ===
- John Derek Allen, CBE, Chairman, Housing for Wales. For services to the Housing Association Movement.
- Professor James Armour, CBE. For services to the Veterinary Profession and to Education.
- Professor Michael Richard Bond, Professor of Psychological Medicine and Vice Principal, University of Glasgow. For services to Medicine.
- Patrick Thomas Cormack, MP, Member of Parliament for Staffordshire South. For political service.
- His Honour Judge Robin Robert Daniel George David, QC, DL, Resident Judge, Chester Crown Court.
- Alastair MacTavish Dunnett, CBE. For services to Journalism and to public life in Scotland.
- The Honourable Rocco Forte, Chairman and Chief Executive, Forte plc. For services to Tourism.
- Ronald Claus Hampel, Chief Executive, Imperial Chemical Industries plc. For services to the Chemical Industry.
- Quinton Hazell, CBE, DL. For political and public service.
- Michael John Hopkins, CBE. For services to Architecture.
- Professor Laurence Colvin Hunter, CBE, Chairman, Police Negotiating Board.
- Professor Miles Horsfall Irving, Professor of Surgery, University of Manchester. For services to Medicine.
- Gavin Harry Laird, CBE, General Secretary, Amalgamated Engineering Union. For public service and services to Industrial Relations.
- The Right Honourable Peter Robert Cable Lloyd, MP, Member of Parliament for Fareham. For political service.
- John Royden Maddox, Editor, Nature. For services to Science.
- Ronald Norman, OBE, Chairman, Teesside Development Corporation. For services to Urban Regeneration.
- Christopher Hammon Paine, President, Royal College of Radiologists and Consultant in Radiotherapy and Oncology, Oxford. For services to Medicine.
- David Bruce Pattullo, CBE, Governor and Group Chief Executive, Bank of Scotland. For services to Banking and to Business.
- Ian Maurice Gray Prosser, Chairman and Chief Executive, Bass plc. For services to the Brewing Industry.
- David Terence Puttnam, CBE, Film Producer. For services to the Film Industry.
- Professor Peter Edward Lionel Russell. For services to Hispanic and Portuguese History and Literature Studies.
- The Right Honourable Timothy Alan Davan Sainsbury, MP, Member of Parliament for Hove. For political, public and charitable services.
- Robert Graham Stephens, Actor. For services to Drama.
- Professor Stewart Ross Sutherland. For services to Education.
- William Michael Vernon, Chairman, Royal National Lifeboat Institution.
- Geoffrey Henry Whalen, CBE, Non Executive Director, lately Deputy Chairman and Managing Director, Peugeot Talbot Motor Company plc. For services to the Motor Manufacturing Industry.
- Gerald Arthur Whent, CBE, Chief Executive, the Vodafone Group plc. For services to the Mobile Telecommunications Industry.
- Professor Arnold Whittaker Wolfendale, FRS, Astronomer Royal and Professor of Physics, University of Durham. For services to Astronomy.

Diplomatic Service and Overseas List

- Richard Masters Gorham, CBE, DFC. For services to the community in Bermuda.
- The Honourable John Joseph Swaine, CBE, QC, JP, President of the Legislative Council, Hong Kong.

=== Order of the Bath ===
==== Knight Grand Cross of the Order of the Bath (GCB) ====
Military Division

Royal Navy

- Admiral Sir Hugo Moresby White, KCB, CBE.

Army

- General Sir Charles John Waters, KCB, CBE, ADC (Gen.), (445998), late The Gloucestershire Regiment.

==== Knight Commander of the Order of the Bath (KCB) ====
Military Division

- Vice Admiral Michael Cecil Boyce, OBE.

Civil Division

- Austen Patrick Brown, Permanent Secretary, Department of Transport.
- Gerald Albery Hosker, CB, QC, Her Majesty's Procurator General and Treasury Solicitor.

==== Companion of the Order of the Bath (CB) ====
Military Division

Royal Navy

- Rear Admiral Neil Erskine Rankin, CBE.
- Rear Admiral John Robert Shiffner

Army

- Major General Simon William St. John Lytle (467594), late Army Air Corps.
- Major General Anthony Leslie Meier, OBE, (455061), late Royal Corps of Transport (since retired).

Royal Air Force

- Air Vice-Marshal Christopher Charles Cotton Coville, Royal Air Force.
- Air Vice-Marshal John Anthony Gerard May, CBE, Royal Air Force.

Civil Division

- Jennifer Helen Bacon, Grade 2, Health and Safety Executive, Department of Employment.
- Alastair Gordon Balls, Chief Executive, Tyne and Wear Development Corporation.
- Robin Arthur Birch, Grade 2, Department of Social Security.
- Brian Elseley Cleave, Solicitor, Inland Revenue.
- Hilary Stephen Crow, lately Chief Planning Inspector and Chief Executive, Planning Inspectorate Agency, Department of the Environment.
- Joan Margaret Firth, Grade 3, Department of Health.
- Jonathan Paul Foster, Grade 3, Foreign and Commonwealth Office.
- Rosalind Edith Jean Gilmore, lately chairman and First Commissioner, Building Societies Commission, and Chief Registrar, Registry of Friendly Societies.
- John Alexander Gordon, Grade 3, Ministry of Defence.
- Anthony Charles Hutton, Grade 2, Department of Trade and Industry.
- Stephen James Lander, Grade 3, Ministry of Defence.
- Michael Charles Malone-Lee, Grade 2, Lord Chancellor's Department.
- Keith Cameron Meldrum, Chief Veterinary Officer, Ministry of Agriculture, Fisheries and Food.
- Harold Hernshaw Mills, Grade 2, Scottish Office.
- Joseph Grant Pilling, Grade 2, Department of Health.
- Oliver Richard Siddle, OBE, General Manager Enterprises, British Council.
- John Martin Steele, OBE, TD, DL, Grade 3, Northern Ireland Office.
- Eric John Thompson, lately deputy director and Director of Statistics, Office of Population Censuses and Surveys.

=== Order of Saint Michael and Saint George ===
==== Knight Grand Cross of the Order of St Michael and St George (GCMG) ====
- Sir David Hugh Alexander Hannay, KCMG, United Kingdom Permanent Representative to the United Nations, New York.

==== Knight Commander of the Order of St Michael and St George (KCMG) ====
- John Gilbert Hanson, CBE, Director General, British Council.
- Peter William Heap, CMG, HM Ambassador, Brasilia.

==== Companion of the Order of St Michael and St George (CMG) ====
- David Robert Campbell Durie, Deputy Permanent Representative to the European Union.

Diplomatic Service and Overseas List

- Anthony Ivall Aust, Foreign and Commonwealth Office.
- David Colin Brown, Foreign and Commonwealth Office.
- Thomas Bryant, H.M. Consul-General, Zurich.
- Christopher Donald Crabbie, H.M. Ambassador, Algiers.
- James Smith-Laittan, British Trade Commission, Hong Kong.
- Michael John Peart, LVO, H.M. Ambassador, Vilnius.
- Geoffrey Alan Tantum, OBE, Foreign and Commonwealth Office.
- Anthony Richard Thomas, H.M. Ambassador, Luanda.

=== Royal Victorian Order ===
==== Dame Commander of the Royal Victorian Order (DCVO) ====
- The Right Honourable Virginia Fortune, Countess of Airlie, CVO, Lady of the Bedchamber to The Queen.
- The Right Honourable Elizabeth, The Lady Grimthorpe, CVO, Lady of the Bedchamber to Queen Elizabeth The Queen Mother.

==== Knight Commander of the Royal Victorian Order (KCVO) ====
- Thomas Raymond Dunne, Lord Lieutenant of Hereford and Worcester.
- Captain Philip Malcolm Edge, Deputy Master and Chairman, Board of Trinity House.
- David Courtenay Mansel Lewis, Lord Lieutenant of Dyfed.

==== Commander of the Royal Victorian Order (CVO) ====
- The Honourable Richard Beaumont, chairman, James Purdey & Sons Ltd.
- Sir Robert John Anderson Carnwath, lately Attorney General to the Prince of Wales.
- Lieutenant Colonel David Edward Cox, LVO, MBE, lately Director of The Prince of Wales's Committee.
- James Jesse Gardner, CBE, lately Chairman of the Trustees of The Prince's Trust.
- Nigel Ralph Southward, LVO, Apothecary to The Queen and Apothecary to the Royal Household.
- Robert Douglas Sturkey, Official Secretary to the Governor-General of Australia.

==== Lieutenant of the Royal Victorian Order (LVO) ====
- Captain Richard Ashworth de Sausmarez Cosby, Royal Navy. For services to HM Yacht Britannia.
- Geoffrey Douglas Crawford, Deputy Press Secretary to The Queen.
- Antony Reginald Kenney, lately Trustee of The Prince's Trust.
- Suzanne Marland, Assistant Private Secretary to The Duchess of Gloucester.
- Peter James Mathers, Head of Royal Matters Unit, Foreign and Commonwealth Office.
- Hugh Ashley Roberts, Deputy Surveyor of the Queen's Works of Art.
- Oliver James Bewsher Prince-White, Royal Liaison Officer at Central Office of Information.
- Commander Nicholas Peter Wright, Royal Navy. For services to HM Yacht Britannia.

==== Member of the Royal Victorian Order (MVO) ====
- John Seymour Barker, Members' Secretary, Royal Ascot.
- Anthony Burrows, Accountant to The Prince and Princess of Wales's Household.
- Donald Clews, lately Honorary Treasurer of the Cheshire Committee of The Prince's Trust.
- Sergeant Andrew Bruce Crichton, lately Royalty and Diplomatic Protection Department, Metropolitan Police.
- Kenneth Dick, lately Director, Crawfords Catering.
- Edward George Fancourt, RVM, Senior Furniture Conservator, Royal Collection Department.
- Sergeant John Robert Harding, RVM, Royalty and Diplomatic Protection Department, Metropolitan Police.
- Genevieve Sallis Holmes, lately Personal Secretary to The Prince of Wales.
- Kevin Michael McGarry, lately Tourism and Arts Officer, Royal Borough of Windsor and Maidenhead.
- Richard Edward Mole, Maintenance Manager, St James's and Kensington Palaces.
- Elizabeth Pauline Moore, Secretary, Farrer & Co.
- Sergeant Allan Ritson Peters, RVM, Royalty and Diplomatic Protection Department, Metropolitan Police.
- Warrant Officer John Pixton, Royal Air Force. For services to The Queen's Flight.
- Roger William Smith, Legal Executive, Duchy of Lancaster.
- Squadron Leader Douglas Alan Whittaker, Royal Air Force. For services to The Queen's Flight.

==== Medal of the Royal Victorian Order (RVM) ====
In Gold

- Fred Veraon Knight, RVM, Foreman Forester, Needwood Estate, Duchy of Lancaster.

In Silver

- Raymond George Frank Adams, Fencer, Crown Estate, Windsor Great Park.
- Petty Officer (Seaman) John Christopher Allen. For services to HM Yacht Britannia.
- Sergeant Graham Paul Bartlett. For services to The Queen's Flight.
- David John Beels, Associate Sales Director, Greenaways.
- Patrick Joseph Bennett, Foreman Gardener, Windsor Great Park, Crown Estate.
- Ronald Arthur John Cooper, lately Gardener, Windsor Great Park, Crown Estate.
- Chief Technician Donald Stephen McKenzie Gordon. For services to The Queen's Flight.
- Sergeant Robert Paul Haden. For services to The Queen's Flight.
- Sergeant David Brian Jones. For services to The Queen's Flight.
- William Frederick Kennedy, lately Plumber's Assistant, Balmoral Estate.
- Sergeant Reginald Frederick Lawrey. For services to The Queen's Flight.
- David Albert Michael Lay, Water Services Turncock, Windsor Castle.
- Corporal Kevin Michael Long. For services to The Queen's Flight.
- Sylvia May Palmer, Stud Manager, Raynham.
- Chief Technician Anthony Keith Robins. For services to The Queen's Flight.
- David Leslie Rogers, Hot Water Fitter, Windsor Castle.
- Constable Robert John Smith, Metropolitan Police Royal Palaces Division.
- Chief Petty Officer Cook Roger Frederick Torr. For services to HM Yacht Britannia.
- Sergeant Colin Edward Woodhouse. For services to The Queen's Flight.

Bar to the RVM (in Silver)

- James Leonard Jackson, RVM, Armourer, Royal Collection Department.

=== Order of the Companions of Honour (CH) ===
- César Milstein. For services to Molecular Biology.
- Professor Carel Victor Morlais Weight, CBE, Professor Emeritus, Royal College of Art. For services to Art.

=== Order of the British Empire ===
==== Dame Commander of the Order of the British Empire (DBE) ====
Civil Division

- Elizabeth Audrey, Lady Anson, DL, deputy chairman, Association of District Councils. For services to Local Government.

Diplomatic Service and Overseas List

- Dr Majorie Louise Bean, OBE. For services to education and the community in Bermuda.

==== Knight Commander of the Order of the British Empire (KBE) ====
Military Division

- Lieutenant General Anthony Arthur Denison-Smith, MBE, (471244), late Grenadier Guards.
- Air Marshal John Anthony Cheshire, CB, CBE, Royal Air Force.

Civil Division

- Sir Peter Leslie Crill, CBE, Bailiff of Jersey.
- The Right Honourable Nicholas Paul Scott, MBE, MP, Member of Parliament for Chelsea. For political service.
- Sir Robert Donald Wilson, chairman, North West Regional Health Authority. For services to Health Care.

==== Commander of the Order of the British Empire (CBE) ====
Military Division

Royal Navy

- Captain Christopher John Esplin-Jones, OBE.
- Commodore Alastair Boyd Ross.
- Captain Michael George Wood.

Army

- Colonel Peter Richard Barry (476454), late 17th/21st Lancers.
- Colonel (Honorary Brigadier) Charles Hendley Bond, OBE, (454986), late The Queen's Dragoon Guards (since retired).
- Colonel Sean Daniel Lambe (471296), late Royal Regiment of Artillery.
- Brigadier Christopher James Marchant-Smith (467598), late The Green Howards.
- Brigadier Edmund Philip Osborn Springfield (481111), late Intelligence Corps.

Royal Air Force

- Air Commodore Colin Ronald Adams, AFC.
- Air Commodore James Stanley Jones.
- Group Captain Peter Brett Walker.
- Air Commodore Graham Wood, (Retired).

Civil Division

- Donald James Alexander, Grade 5, Department of Finance and Personnel Development.
- Keith Douglas Anderson, Chief Education Officer for Gloucestershire. For services to Education.
- Frank Atkinson, OBE, lately Member, Museums and Galleries Commission. For services to the Development of Museums.
- Raj Bagri, Chairman, London Metal Exchange. For services to the Metal Manufacturing Industry.
- Diana Clare Banks, OBE. For political and public service.
- James Walter Barron, lately Keeper of the Registers, Scottish Office.
- Nina Mary Bawden (Mrs. Kark), Novelist. For services to Literature.
- Peter Andrew Bearpark, Grade 5, Overseas Development Administration.
- Gerald Adrian Sallis Benney, Silversmith and Goldsmith. For services to Art.
- Michael James Bentine. For services to Entertainment.
- Crawford William Beveridge, Chief Executive, Scottish Enterprise. For services to Business in Scotland.
- Professor John Peter Blandy, Vice President, Royal College of Surgeons and Emeritus Professor of Urology, London Hospital Medical College. For services to Medicine.
- Professor Martin Bobrow, Prince Philip Professor of Paediatric Research, United Medical and Dental Schools of Guy's and St Thomas' Hospitals. For services to Science.
- Sarah Ann Booth, Grade 5, Department of National Heritage.
- Paul Graham Bosonnet, Deputy Chairman, British Telecommunications plc. For services to the Telecommunications Industry.
- Jane Hope Bown, MBE, Chief Photographer, The Observer. For services to Journalism.
- Diana, Lady Brittan, Commissioner and Deputy Chairwoman, Equal Opportunities Commission. For services to Equal Opportunities.
- John Broadfoot, lately Controller, Commission (Civil Division) for Local Authority Accounts in Scotland. For services to Local Government.
- Professor Christopher Nugent Lawrence Brooke, Dixie Professor Emeritus of Ecclesiastical History, University of Cambridge. For services to History.
- John Neville Brown, President, VAT Practitioners' Group. For services to Taxation Policy.
- Peter Duncan Burgess, Grade 5, Department of Transport.
- Alan Dodds Burnett, Lord Mayor of Portsmouth. For services to the D-Day 50th Anniversary Commemorations.
- Roger John Nicholas Busby, Regional Director, Forestry Commission.
- Eileen Buttle, lately Secretary, Natural Environment Research Council. For services to Science.
- Eric Clark, Chairman, BICC Cables Ltd. For services to the Cable Industry.
- Michael Clasper, Managing Director and Vice President, Procter & Gamble Europe. For services to the Environment.
- Rosslyn Fairfax Huxley Cowen, MBE, Chairman, Rank Foundation. For charitable services.
- Professor Robert Rees Davies, Professor of History, University College of Wales. For services to History and to Education.
- Richard Johann Dunn, Chief Executive, Thames Television Ltd. For services to Broadcasting.
- Simon Dyer, Director General, the Automobile Association. For services to Motoring.
- John Wynford Evans. For services to the community in Wales.
- John Walter Douglas Ewart, DL. For political and public service.
- Professor Richard George Andrew Feachem, Dean, London School of Hygiene and Tropical Medicine. For services to International Public Health.
- Henry Rudston Fell, Member, Royal Commission on Environmental Pollution. For services to Agriculture and to the Environment.
- Alex Chapman Ferguson, OBE. For services to Association Football.
- Professor Eric Campbell Fernie, Chairman, Ancient Monuments Board for Scotland. For services to Conservation and to Architectural History.
- Ronald Hurbert Fielding. For political and public service.
- Sydney Walter Fremantle, lately Grade 5, Department of Trade and Industry.
- Pamela Jane Garside, The Chief Commissioner of the Guide Association and the Commonwealth Chief Commissioner. For services to the Guide Movement.
- Professor Robert James Gavin. For services to Higher Education.
- Brian Victor George, Executive Director, Engineering, Nuclear Electric plc. For services to the Nuclear Electricity Industry.
- George Gill, Leader, Gateshead Metropolitan Borough Council. For services to Local Government.
- Diana Goldsworthy, Grade 5, Office of Public Service and Science, Cabinet Office.
- Professor John Francis Bradshaw Goodman. For services to Industrial Relations.
- John Terence Green, lately Grade 4, Department of Social Security.
- William Maximillian Griggs, Company President, R. Griggs Group Ltd. For services to the Footwear Industry and to Export.
- Sidney Grose. For political and public service.
- David Michael Gwyther, lately Chairman, Somerset Training and Enterprise Council. For services to Training.
- David John Hardwick, lately Grade 5, Home Office.
- Geoffrey Farrar Harper, MBE. For political service.
- John William Hayes, Secretary General, The Law Society. For services to the Law.
- Jonathan Hopkin Hill, Political Secretary to the Prime Minister.
- Kenneth Harvard Hind. For political service.
- John Holland, DL, Chief Commoner, the Corporation of London. For services to the City of London.
- Roger Grahame Hood, Reader in Criminology and Director, Centre for Criminological Research, University of Oxford. For services to the Study of Criminology.
- John Stewart Horsnell, lately Chief Executive, Isle of Wight County Council. For services to Local Government.
- Peter James Howarth, Managing Director, Royal Mail, the Post Office.
- Donald William Insall, OBE, Architect and Planning Consultant. For services to Conservation.
- Norman MacFarlane Irons, Lord Provost and Lord Lieutenant of the City of Edinburgh. For services to Local Government.
- Lewis Carter-Jones. For services to disabled people.
- Felicity Ann Kendal, Actress. For services to Drama.
- Paul Bolingbroke Kent, Grade 5, Her Majesty's Board of Customs and Excise.
- Graham Kinder, Chairman, Babtie Group Ltd. For services to Engineering and to Export.
- Christopher Philip King, lately Chairman, BP Europe. For services to British Industry in Europe.
- Peter Clayton Knight, Vice Chancellor, University of Central England in Birmingham. For services to Higher Education.
- Anthony Ledwith, Head of Group Research, Pilkington plc. For services to Science.
- Philip Solven Lewis, lately Grade 5, Department for Education.
- Christopher Littmoden. For services to the Ministry of Defence.
- Professor Andrew Henry Garmany Love, Professor of Medicine, Queen's University Belfast. For services to Medicine.
- Leonard John Martin. For services to the Actuarial Profession.
- Madeleine May, lately Executive Director, International Bar Association. For services to the Legal Profession.
- Anne Bernadette, Lady McCollum, DL. For services to Consumer Protection.
- James Archibald McIntyre, OBE, Chairman, Dumfries and Galloway Health Board. For services to Health Care.
- Professor Peter Halliday McKie. For services to the Textile Industry.
- Michael Ashley-Miller. Secretary, Nuffield Provincial Hospitals Trust. For services to Medicine.
- James Smith Milne, Chairman and Managing Director, Balmoral Group Ltd. For services to Industry.
- George Malcolm Murray, Director and Chief General Manager, Scottish Life Assurance Company. For services to the Insurance Industry and to Public Life in Scotland.
- Stuart Norman Mustow, Consulting Engineer and Non-Executive Director, W. S. Atkins Consultants. For services to Civil Engineering.
- Professor Howard Joseph Newby, lately Chief Executive, Economic and Social Research Council. For services to Economic and Social Sciences.
- Professor David Harry Newsome, Senior Partner, CNS Scientific and Engineering Services. For services to the Development of Weather Radar and to Water Management in Developing Countries.
- Ian Grahame Park, Managing Director, Northcliffe Newspapers Group Ltd. For services to Journalism and to the Newspaper Industry.
- James Graham Park. For political service.
- Derek Pooley, Chief Executive, UKAEA Government Division. For services to the Nuclear Industry.
- Usha Prashar. For services to Community Relations.
- John Reddington, QPM, lately Chief Constable, Ministry of Defence Police.
- Professor Charles Wayne Rees, FRS, lately President, Royal Society of Chemistry. For services to Chemistry.
- William Robert Ashley Birch Reynardson, Vice President, Comité Maritime International. For services to Maritime Law.
- Professor Edward Osmund Royle Reynolds, FRS, Professor of Neonatal Medicine, University College London. For services to Medicine.
- William Samuel. For political service.
- Robert John Seaney, lately Grade 5, Ministry of Defence.
- Alastair Stanley Douglas Service, Chairman, Wiltshire and Bath District Health Authority. For services to Health Care.
- Dennis Raoul Whitehall Silk. For services to Cricket and to Education.
- Rosemary Jill Simpson, MBE. For political and public service.
- Colin Roderick Smith, CVO, QPM, Her Majesty's Inspector of Constabulary.
- Christopher Dudley Stewart-Smith, lately President, Association of British Chambers of Commerce. For services to the Chamber of Commerce Movement.
- Robert Stevenson Steven, lately Chairman, Milk Marketing Board. For services to the Dairy Industry.
- Roy James Tazzyman, Chief Executive, Davy International Ltd. For services to Export and to the Steel Industry.
- George Michael Threadgold, Chief Fire Officer, South Yorkshire Fire and Rescue Service.
- Anthony Douglas Toft, Consultant Physician, Royal Infirmary, Edinburgh, and President, Royal College of Physicians of Edinburgh. For services to Medicine.
- The Reverend Edward Chad Varah, OBE, Founder, The Samaritans.
- Edward James Varney, lately Deputy Chief Inspector of Nuclear Installations, Health and Safety Executive, Department of Employment.
- Malcolm Conrad Walker, Chairman and Chief Executive, Iceland Group plc. For services to the Frozen Food Industry.
- Roger Straughan Ward, Chief Executive, Universities and Colleges Employers' Forum. For services to Higher Education.
- Mary Aline Wesley, Writer. For services to Literature.
- Ian Arthur White, Director of Social Services, Oxfordshire County Council. For services to Local Government.
- Willard White, Opera Singer. For services to Music.
- Derek Alexander Wood, QC, Member, Property Advisory Group. For services to Property Law.
- Dudley Ernest Wood, Secretary, Rugby Football Union. For services to Rugby Union Football.

Diplomatic Service and Overseas List

- Chau Tak-hay, JP, Secretary for Trade and Industry, Hong Kong.
- Professor The Honourable Edward Chen, JP, Director, Centre of Asian Studies, Hong Kong University.
- Professor Cheng Yiu-chung, Director, City Polytechnic, Hong Kong.
- Mary Louise Croll, HM Ambassador, San José.
- Anthony Gordon Eason, JP, Secretary for Planning, Environment and Lands, Hong Kong.
- The Honourable Howard Archibald Fergus, OBE, Speaker of the Legislative Council, Montserrat.
- Dr. Valerie Jane Goodall. For services to zoology.
- Gordon Graham Layton, OBE. For services to the community in Pakistan.
- Barrie Dale Linley. For services to British commercial interests in the United States.
- Ronald Sampson, lately Chief Executive, Falkland Islands Government.
- Peter John Smith, HM Ambassador, Antananarivo.

==== Officer of the Order of the British Empire (OBE) ====
Military Division

Royal Navy

- Commander John Brendon Harold Binns.
- Commander Peter Graham Blanchford.
- Commander John Havill.
- Lieutenant Colonel (now Colonel) Simon Patrick Hill, Royal Marines.
- Commander David Leonard Palmer.
- Commander Robert Colin Seaward.
- Commander Trevor Alan Soar.

Army

- Lieutenant Colonel (now Colonel) Thomas George French, TD (484244), The Light Infantry, Territorial Army.
- Lieutenant Colonel Gordon Keith Geddie (488270), The Royal Logistic Corps.
- Lieutenant Colonel David Leslie Hooper (007088), The Gibraltar Regiment (since retired).
- Lieutenant Colonel Robert Cecil John Martin (494442), The Royal Green Jackets.
- Lieutenant Colonel Richard John Rimmer (479330), The Royal Green Jackets.
- Lieutenant Colonel William Francis Shuttlewood, MBE (489211), Royal Gurkha Rifles.
- Lieutenant Colonel Richard James Scott Smith, QGM (495235) Royal Regiment of Artillery.
- Lieutenant Colonel Martin Spencer Vine (495248), The Royal Gloucestershire, Berkshire and Wiltshire Regiment.
- Lieutenant Colonel Gerald Cavendish Grosvenor, The Duke of Westminster (494683), The Queen's Own Yeomanry, Territorial Army.

Royal Air Force

- Wing Commander John Philip Blackman (5201647).
- Wing Commander David Ayton Haward (8025844).
- Wing Commander Herbert Barrie Hingley, MBE (3524102).
- Wing Commander Kenneth William Kerslake (2590917), RAF Volunteer Reserve (Training).
- Wing Commander Ian Robert McLuskie (4233404).
- Wing Commander Richard James Milsom, MBE (0608378).
- Wing Commander Alan Sawyer (8025499).
- Wing Commander David Walker, MVO (5202771).
- Wing Commander David Patrick Yates (0689006).

Civil Division

- David Emanuel Abelson, chairman, Boards of Visitors Co-ordinating Committee. For services to Prisons (prisoners and staff).
- Bernard John Acland, Member, Air Cadet Council. For services to Young People.
- Edmund Ramsay Adam, Management Agent, Prototype Fast Reactor Decommissioning, UKAEA. For services to the Nuclear Industry.
- Keith Ajegbo, Headteacher, Deptford Green School, London. For services to Education.
- Howard Vernon Ashford, Senior Principal Scientific Officer, Ministry of Defence.
- Anthony Aston, Director, Community Services, Royal National Institute for the Blind. For services to Transport for Visually Impaired People.
- George Nicholas Alexander Bailey. For political and public service.
- Sidney James Barber. For services to the Magistracy in Dorset.
- Gerald Emerson Barlow, lately Director, Aberlour Child Care Trust. For services to Young People.
- Nevile Robert Disney Barlow, lately Convener, Scottish Landowners' Federation. For services to Agriculture.
- Reginald Kenneth Sidney Barr, chairman, Nobo Group plc. For services to the Visual Aids Industry.
- David Keith Barrows, Grade 7, Office of Public Service and Science, Cabinet Office, and Treasurer, Friends of Brookwood Hospital.
- Morris George Barton. For political and public service.
- George Armour Bell, chairman, Monklands and Bellshill Hospitals NHS Trust. For services to the community in Lanarkshire.
- The Reverend Gordon Benfield, lately chairman, Christian Education Movement. For services to Education.
- William Ingham Brooke Bennett, Flautist. For services to Music.
- Graham Richard Bird, Director of Communications and New Services, Voluntary Service Overseas. For services to Voluntary Service Overseas.
- Jurat Harry Wilson Bisson, Senior Lieutenant Bailiff, Guernsey. For services to the community on Guernsey.
- Alan Frederick Bloomfield, Group Purchasing Manager, Caberboard. For services to the Forestry Industry.
- Alan George Bloxham, Grade 7, Department of Social Security.
- John Bonomy. For services to the Magistracy in Kent.
- Christopher Ingram Bostock, Member of the council and executive committee, City Technology College Trust. For services to Education.
- John Henry Brackston. For political and public service.
- David John Bradley, chairman, Thomas Watson (Shipping) Ltd. For services to the Shipping Industry.
- Michael Curtis Brewer, Director of Music, Chetham's School of Music, Manchester. For services to Music Education.
- Michael John Cairns Brodie, lately Grade 6, Central Office of Information.
- George Arthur Brooker, Leader, London Borough of Barking and Dagenham. For services to Local Government.
- Harry Brooksby, lately Deputy Secretary, Royal Commission on Ancient and Historical Monuments in Wales.
- Roger Drury Browne, lately Assistant Managing Director, Taywood Engineering. For services to the Construction Industry.
- Alan Christopher Bryant. For services to the Young Men's Christian Association.
- Hadley Joseph Buck, lately Member, Council of Management, Architectural Heritage Fund. For services to Conservation.
- John Douglas Burch, Grade 7, Property Services Agency, Department of the Environment.
- Darcey Andrea Bussell, Principal Ballerina, Royal Ballet. For services to Ballet.
- Robert Trefor Campbell. For services to the Food Industry.
- Simon Richard Card. For political service.
- Jennifer Jean Carter, Senior Lecturer in History, University of Aberdeen. For services to the University of Aberdeen.
- John Ashley Catterall, Secretary and Chief Executive, Institute of Materials. For services to Industry.
- James R. Catto. For services to the community in Wirral, Merseyside.
- David John Church, Grade 7, Overseas Development Administration.
- Eric Patrick Clapton, Musician and Composer. For services to Music.
- John Edward Clark, Secretary, National Association of Local Councils. For services to Local Government.
- Jack Richard Clark, lately Director of Finance and Deputy Chief Executive, Warrington Borough Council. For services to Local Government.
- Michael Kenneth Clark. For political and public service.
- Linda Mary Clarke, Grade 7, Department for Education.
- Derrick William Cleal. For services to the community in Crewkerne, Somerset.
- Ronald Anthony Clegg, chairman, United Leeds Teaching Hospitals NHS Trust. For services to Health Care and to the community in Leeds.
- The Honourable Leonard Harold Lionel Cohen. For charitable services.
- Carol Comboy, President, Ladies' Golf Union. For services to Ladies' Golf.
- Edith Mary Cooke, deputy director, Public Health Laboratory Service, London. For services to Medicine.
- Raymond Edward Corrigan, Grade 5, Home Office.
- John Frederick Cousins, managing director, Deep Sea Seals Ltd. For services to the Defence Industry.
- Ian James Cowan, lately chairman, Crossroads (Scotland) Care Attendant Scheme. For services to Carers.
- Derek Maurice Cox, Senior Youth and Community Worker, Young Women's Christian Association. For services to Young People.
- Christopher Donald Dane, chairman and managing director, Dane & Company Ltd. For services to the Screen Printing Industry.
- Professor David Roy Davies, lately Head of Applied Genetics Department, John Innes Centre, Norwich. For services to Genetic Research.
- Ieuan Erith Davies, Grade 7, Ministry of Defence.
- Brian Ronald Worster-Davis. For services to the Magistracy.
- Sydney Davis, vice-president, Association of Jewish Ex-Servicemen and Women. For services to Ex-Servicemen and Women.
- Nicole Matilde Davoud, MBE. For services to the employment of disabled people.
- Lieutenant Colonel Michael Garvey Day, MBE (Retd.), lately Chief Executive, the Royal British Legion Attendants Company Ltd. For services to the Royal British Legion.
- Dennis John Deletant, Reader in Romanian Studies, University of London. For services to British/Romanian Relations.
- Alan Graham Dewar, chairman, Board of Management, Oatridge Agricultural College, West Lothian. For services to Agricultural Education.
- Ian Gerrard Dewar, Secretary, Historic Buildings Council for Scotland.
- Janet Margaret Dewdney, Director and vice-president, Biotechnology (Europe), SmithKline Beecham. For services to the Pharmaceutical Industry.
- John Pirrie Dick, Head of Conservation, National Galleries of Scotland
- Stephen Charles Duckworth. For services to disabled people.
- Anthony Norman Duerr, chairman, F. Duerr & Sons Ltd. For services to the Food Industry.
- Barbara Mary Durno, Farmer. For services to Agriculture.
- David Edwards, managing director, SLP Engineering Ltd. For services to the Offshore Engineering Industry.
- The Very Reverend David Lawrence Edwards, lately Provost of Southwark Cathedral. For services to the Church of England.
- Elizabeth Alice Edwards, lately Chief Area Nursing Officer, Tayside Health Board. For services to Health Care.
- Christopher Thomas Evans, Founder of Enzymatix Ltd., Toad plc, Celsis International plc and Chiroscience plc. For services to Biotechnology Development.
- Pauline Fairbrother, vice-president, Mencap. For services to Mencap.
- Jack Mansergh Farraday. For services to the community in Bury, Lancashire.
- William Mackinnon Fernie, chairman, Hearing Aid Council. For services to Consumer Protection.
- Simon John Fielding, chairman, General Council and Register of Osteopaths. For Services to Health Care.
- Jean Firminger, Director of Human Resources, Women's Royal Voluntary Service.
- Wilhelmena Fitzgerald. For services to the Medical Industry.
- Edmund Francis Lloyd Fitzhugh, chairman, Board of Management, Royal Welsh Agricultural Society. For services to Agriculture in Wales.
- Ronald Henry Flowers, lately Member, Radioactive Waste Management Advisory Committee. For services to Environmental Issues.
- Henry Steuart Fothringham of Grantully, lately Member, Reviewing Committee on the Export of Works of Art and Chairman of the Silver Society. For services to Heritage.
- Anthony Fox, Principal, Myerscough College. For services to Agricultural Education.
- Brian Freeman, Grade 7, Department of Trade and Industry.
- Ian William Galloway, Chief Executive, Walter Alexander plc. For services to Export.
- Kenneth George Gardner, lately Grade 6, Department of Health.
- Douglas Gow Garvie. For services to the employment of disabled people.
- Margaret Joy Gelling. For services to Philology.
- David John Rex George, Social Services Inspector, Department of Health.
- Colonel James David Gibb, TD, Employer Liaison Officer, Highland Territorial, Auxiliary and Volunteer Reserve Association.
- Peter Gibson, MBE, lately Superintendent, York Glaziers' Trust. For services to the Conservation of Glass.
- William George Giles, Principal Scientific Officer and Television Weather Presenter, Meteorological Office.
- Anne Johnston Jack Gilmore, Founder and Chief Executive, Prince and Princess of Wales Hospice, Glasgow. For services to Health Care.
- Geoffrey Richard Gollop. For political service.
- Gerald John Goodban, District Valuer, Her Majesty's Board of Inland Revenue.
- Major Campbell Graham, MBE, Manager, Lady Haig's Poppy Factory. For services to Ex-Servicemen and Women.
- Cecil William Lavery Graham, lately Grade 7, Department of Economic Development.
- Marjorie Olivia Grant, Chief Executive, Tyneside Training and Enterprise Council. For services to Training.
- Professor Brynmor Hugh Green. For services to Countryside and Nature Conservation.
- Professor Christopher John Charles Green. For services to the community, particularly the Arts in East Anglia.
- Ronald William Alfred Groom, chairman, Percy Bilton Charity. For charitable services in Buckinghamshire.
- Reginald George Gutteridge. For services to Boxing, Journalism, and to Broadcasting.
- Michael Arthur Hadfield. For services to Business and to the Community in Chesterfield, Derbyshire.
- Colin Wyatt Hall, lately Chief Engineer Officer, Ministry of Agriculture Fisheries and Food.
- Lieutenant Commander John Edgecombe Hammond (Retd.), Controller, Aeromedical Service and Manager, Quality Assurance, St. John Ambulance. For services to Health Care.
- John Logan Hannah, chairman, BMT Defence Services. For services to the Defence Industry.
- Raymond Arthur Hawes, Director, Acute Services and executive director (Nursing), North East Essex Mental Health Services NHS Trust. For services to Health Care.
- George Paton Henderson, National Secretary, Transport and General Workers Union, Building Construction and Civil Engineering and Building Crafts Section. For services to Industrial Relations.
- Margaret Jennifer Heraty, Transport Consultant. For services to Transport, especially for disabled people.
- James William Thomas Hill. For services to Association Football and to Broadcasting.
- Professor Peter John Hills, Professor of Transport Engineering and Director of Transport Operations Research Group, University of Newcastle upon Tyne. For services to Transportation Planning and Research.
- Patricia Ann Hitchcock, Grade 7, Ministry of Defence.
- Clive Thomas Patrick Hollands, Member, Animal Procedures Committee. For services to Animal Welfare.
- Robert Henry Hollyhock, Principal, Sutton Coldfield College of Further Education. For services to Further Education.
- Richard David Cairns Hubbard, deputy chairman, Cancer Research Campaign. For services to Cancer Research.
- Gerry Humphreys, Chief of Sound, Twickenham Film Studios. For services to the Film Industry.
- Rachel Mary Rosalind Hurst, Project Director, Disability Awareness in Action, and chair, Disabled Peoples' International European Union. For services to disabled people.
- Robert Belshaw Irwin. For services to Forensic Medicine.
- Graham Percy Jackson, BEM, chairman, Central Council of Magistrates' Courts Committee. For services to the Magistracy.
- Alan Michael James, District Inspector, Her Majesty's Board of Inland Revenue.
- John Valentine McCulloch Jameson, DL, chairman, Dumfries and Galloway Enterprise. For services to Business and to Public Life in Dumfries and Galloway.
- Terence Anthony Jenner, Deputy Solicitor, British Railways Board. For services to the Railways Industry.
- Jacob Barnett Joel, Grade 7, Department of Employment.
- Evelyn Mary Johnston, Nursing Officer, Department of Health and Social Services.
- Geraint Jones, Courts Administrator, Lord Chancellor's Department, Cardiff.
- Lilian Mary Jones, Headteacher, Ysgol Gyfun Gwynllyw, Pontypool. For services to Education.
- Margaret Fiona, Lady Benton Jones, President, British Red Cross Society, Lincolnshire.
- Geraldine Mary Marcella Keegan. For services to Education.
- Morfydd Rozella Keen (Mrs. Entwistle). For services to the Prevention of the Misuse of Drugs and Alcohol in Cardiff.
- Lily Khan. For services to the community, particularly the Asian community, in Surrey.
- Anthony Frederick Kilford, Her Majesty's (Senior) Operations Inspector of Fire Services.
- Major Anthony Gwyn Burton King (Retd.), Grade 6, HM Railway Inspectorate, Health and Safety Executive, Department of Employment.
- John Vivian King, District Inspector, Her Majesty's Board of Inland Revenue.
- Erwin Ludwig Klinge. For services to United Response.
- Ebrahim Mohammad Kotwal, Grade 6, Lord Chancellor's Department.
- Marjorie Somerville Langford. For services to Equestrianism, particularly for disabled people.
- Professor Erika Hedwig Langmuir, Head of Education, National Gallery.
- Pauline Latham, Chairman of Governors, Ecclesbourne Secondary School, Derby. For services to Education.
- Derek Arthur Leach, Grade 7, Her Majesty's Board of Customs and Excise.
- Frances Ryder Lewington, Principal Scientific Officer, Metropolitan Police Forensic Science Laboratory. For services to Forensic Science.
- Ernest William James Lockhart, MBE. For services to the community in Southend-on-Sea, Essex.
- Sydney Warren Lotterby, Producer, BBC Television. For services to Broadcasting.
- Joanna Lamond Lumley, Actress. For services to Drama.
- Lieutenant Colonel Archibald Michael Lyle (Retd.), DL. For services to the community in Perthshire.
- Christine Anne MacDonald, Director of Quality, Manchester Children's Hospitals. For services to Paediatric Nursing.
- Eleanor Catherine Macdonald, MBE. For services to Women's Issues.
- Professor Alexander Mair. For services to Occupational Health.
- Hugh Innes Powell Mantle. For services to Canoeing.
- John Henry Markham, General Manager, Surfactants Group, Albright and Wilson, Smethwick. For services to Industry in West Cumbria.
- Jonathan Arthur Martin, Head of Sport and Events Group, BBC Television. For services to Broadcasting and to Sport.
- Geoffrey Mason. For services to the Yorkshire Kidney Research Fund.
- Jeanette Miller Mason, deputy chairman, Irvine Development Corporation. For public services, especially to the New Towns, in Scotland.
- Arthur George McAllister, President, British Athletic Federation. For services to Athletics.
- The Reverend James McAllister. For services to Education.
- Charles McCullagh. For services to Health Education.
- Professor Colin Frederick Mills. For services to Education and humanitarian relief in the former Yugoslavia.
- Joseph Laurance Mills. For services to Industrial Relations and to the community in North East England.
- John Douglas Mitchell, Chief Executive, Principality Building Society. For services to the Building Society Movement.
- Wilfred George Monahan, QPM, lately Assistant Chief Constable. For services to the Police.
- Professor Khursheed Francis Moos, Consultant Maxillofacial Surgeon, Greater Glasgow Health Board. For services to Medicine.
- The Reverend John Ivor Morgans. For services to the community in Penrhys, Rhondda.
- Norah Morgans. For services to the community in Penrhys, Rhondda.
- Anne Morrison, First Secretary, Foreign and Commonwealth Office.
- Margaret Morrissey. For services to Parent/Teacher Associations.
- Professor Bevan Edwin Bowan Moseley, Member, Advisory Committee on Novel Foods and Processes. For services to the Food Industry.
- Peter Mullen, lately Headteacher, Holyrood Secondary School, Glasgow. For services to Education.
- Barry Natton, Chief Executive, Merseyside Improved Houses. For services to the Construction Industry.
- Cecil Arthur Newell. For political and public service.
- Dorothy Hope Newton, Grade 6, Highways Agency, Department of Transport.
- David Riad Nuwar, managing director, GQ Parachutes Ltd. For services to the Parachute Industry.
- Robert Brian Oakley, Grade 7, Department of Education.
- John Raymond Onion, Head of Business Development, British Aerospace Defence (Dynamics). For services to the Defence Industry.
- Raymond James Otter, Grade 6, Department of the Environment.
- Kenneth Wilson Palmer, Leader, South Ribble Borough Council, Lancashire. For services to Local Government.
- Marcus Patton. For services to Conservation.
- Major Michael Maitland Tighe Paxton, TD. For services to the community, particularly the Scout Movement, in Berkshire.
- Mavis Peart. For political and public service.
- Margaret Plouviez, Vice Chairman, Hillingdon District Health Authority. For services to Health Care and to the community in Hillingdon, London.
- Geoffrey Colin Powell, Chief Adviser to the States of Jersey.
- Richard Mervyn Price. For political service.
- Julian Humphrey Prideaux, Chief Agent, the National Trust. For services to the National Trust.
- Thomas Colin Neil Ransom, lately chairman, Royal Agricultural Benevolent Institution. For charitable services to the Farming Community.
- Michael Frank Brooke Read, Headteacher, Geoffrey Chaucer Secondary School, Southwark, London. For services to Education.
- Melvyn Redgers, Vice Chairman, Advisory Committee on Justices of the Peace, North East Area. For services to the Magistracy.
- Robert C. Reed, DL. For services to Education in the Cynon Valley, South Wales.
- James Andrew Reid, Inspector of Taxes, Her Majesty's Board of Inland Revenue.
- Arnold Reuben. For services to the community in Leeds.
- Brian James Reynolds, Deputy Chief Constable, Thames Valley Police.
- Gordon William Rich, Grade 7, Ministry of Defence.
- Professor Robert Michael Edward Richards, Professor of Pharmacy, Robert Gordon University, Aberdeen. For services to Pharmacy.
- John Christopher Rigg, chairman, Vega Group plc and Triad Special Systems Ltd. For services to the Space Industry.
- Terence Arthur Roberts, Head, Microbiology Department, Institute of Food Research. For services to the Safety of Food.
- Jennifer Robson, President, Northumbria Tourist Board. For services to Tourism.
- Brian Adrian Roebuck, lately Forest District Manager, Forestry Commission.
- Lewis Michael Rose. For political and public service.
- Michael Samuel Rosenberg, Member, Hong Kong Action Committee, Asia Pacific Advisory Group. For services to Export.
- Donald John Roskilly, Technical Director, National Listening Library. For services to Blind and other disabled people.
- Gerard Ross, Governor 2, Her Majesty's Prison Leicester.
- John Ross. For services to the community in Chester.
- Samuel Russell Rowbotham, Director of Housing, City of Dundee District Council. For services to Local Government.
- Paul Chandrasekharan Sabapathy, chair, Finance and Audit Committee, Birmingham Heartlands Development Corporation. For services to Urban Regeneration.
- Anthony Edward Jonathan Sanders, managing director, Mouchel Management Ltd. For services to Civil Engineering.
- Peter Arthur Saunders, chairman and managing director, Halo Foods Ltd. For services to Industry in Wales.
- Bernard McAuley Scott, Member, Strathclyde Regional Council. For services to Local Government.
- Lewis Cross Scott, lately Vice President, Cambuslang Operations and Floorcare Operations (Europe), Hoover Ltd. For services to Manufacturing in Scotland.
- Marie Elizabeth Ann Scully, chairman, Domestic Coal Consumers' Council. For services to Consumer Protection.
- Henry Charles Seymour, managing director, Britdoc Ltd. For services to the Document Exchange Industry.
- John Bernard Shelley, lately Treasurer, Association of Charitable Foundations. For charitable services.
- Brian Walter Sherratt, Headmaster, Great Barr Grant-maintained School, Birmingham. For services to Education.
- John Warren Shipley. For political and public service.
- Eunice Simpkins, Grade 7, Her Majesty's Board of Customs and Excise.
- Dorothy Isobel Simpson. For services to Education.
- Professor Hugh Cameron Simpson, chairman, Advisory Committee on the Safety of Nuclear Installations Research sub-Committee. For services to the Nuclear Industry.
- Harry Bruce Singer, TD, DL, Honorary Treasurer, Soldiers', Sailors' and Airmen's Families Association.
- Delia Smith, Cookery Writer and Broadcaster.
- Peter Lawson-Smith, Director and Founder Chairman, National Inspection Council Quality Assurance Ltd. For services to Consumer Protection.
- Timothy Francis Statham. For political service.
- Graham Charles Stemp, Grade 6, Radiocommunications Agency, Department of Trade and Industry.
- Hans Fergus Stewart, Area Chairman, Sea Cadet Corps, For services to Young People.
- Andrew Stunell. For political service.
- William McNeil Styles, Chairman of Council, Royal College of General Practitioners. For services to Medicine.
- Michael Arthur Summersby. For political and public service.
- Charles Wilfred David Sutcliffe, DL, chairman and Joint Managing Director, Benson Turner Ltd. For services to the Textile Industry.
- John William Sutcliffe, Operational Manager, Her Majesty's Board of Inland Revenue.
- Rosalind Sutton, Grade 7, Department of Employment.
- Michael William Swallow. For services to Music Therapy and Arts for Disabled People.
- John Pinder Taberner, lately External Relations Director, Eurotunnel. For services to Engineering and to the Channel Tunnel Project.
- Kenneth Rowland Thomas, Member, Occupational Pensions Board.
- William David Thomas. For services to Local Government in Wales.
- John David Frederick Michael Thornton, Director, T & D Industries plc. For services to the Metal and Plastics Industries.
- John Arthur Wells-Thorpe. For services to Architecture.
- The Reverend Peter Timms. For services to Prisoner Welfare.
- Donald Hamilton Tod, MBE. Chairman, Liverpool Health Authority. For services to Health Care.
- John Toothill, National Park Officer, Lake District Special Planning Board. For services to the National Parks.
- Meryl Irene Townsend. For services to Elderly People.
- Geoffrey Ashworth Truesdale. For services to the Water Industry.
- Bernard James Vaughan, chair, Bournemouth and Poole College of Further Education Corporation. For services to Further Education.
- Michael John Vint, chairman, Buildings Energy Efficiency Confederation. For services to Energy Efficiency.
- David Norman Wallace, Farmer. For services to Agriculture.
- Denise Ann Watson, Headteacher, Chaucer School, Sheffield. For services to Education.
- Doris Evelyn Webster. For services to the community in Poole, Dorset.
- Christopher Wheddon, Director, Software and Systems Integration, British Telecommunications plc. For services to the Development of Speech Technology.
- Christine Mary Kathleen Wheeler, chairman, CW Energy Tax Consultants Ltd. For services to the Oil Industry.
- Kenneth Stuart White, lately Station Manager, Heysham 2 Power Station, Nuclear Electric plc. For services to the Nuclear Electricity Industry.
- Raymond John Whitehead. For political and public service.
- Peter Wildblood, Chief Executive, Oil Exchange. For services to the Futures Industry.
- Professor Edward Idris Williams, Professor of General Practice, University of Nottingham. For services to Medicine.
- Keith Gillin Williams, lately Grade 6, Office for Standards in Education.
- Raymond Williams. For services to Sport, especially Rugby Union Football.
- David Robert Williamson. For political and public service.
- Robert Buchanan Williamson, Inspector of Salmon and Freshwater Fisheries, Scottish Office.
- Captain Colin Wilson, Royal Navy (Retd.) For services to Worcester Cathedral.
- Lorna Gladys Wing. For services to the National Autistic Society.
- David Winn. For services to the community in South London.
- Thomas Antony Winton, Logistics Manager. For humanitarian services in the former Yugoslavia.
- Dennis Trevor Witcombe, Headmaster, Nottingham High School. For services to Education.
- Stanley Wood. For services to the Baking Industry.
- Lieutenant Colonel Charles Geoffrey Wylie (Retd.), Executive Secretary, Britain-Nepal Medical Trust. For charitable services.
- Morag Alison Younie, lately Chief Executive, Chest, Heart and Stroke Association, Scotland. For charitable services.

Diplomatic Service and Overseas List

- Nicholas John Lewis Busvine, First Secretary, British Embassy, Maputo.
- Dr. Hugh Maurice Carpenter, Regional Medical Officer, HM Embassy, Moscow.
- David Thomas Rhys Carse, Deputy Chief Executive, Hong Kong Monetary Authority.
- Peter Warren Chandley, MVO, Deputy Head of Mission, British Embassy, Bogota.
- Chau How-chen, MBE, JP. For services to the community in Hong Kong.
- Chung Po Yang. For services to the arts in Hong Kong.
- Dr. Kenneth Geoffrey Churchill, Director, British Council, Brussels.
- Anthony Temple Cope. For services to the British community in the United States.
- Ian Lawrence Crocker. For services to British commercial interests in Portugal.
- John Bertram Curran. For services to the British community in Singapore.
- Andrew Dixon. For services to British commercial interests in Saudi Arabia.
- Alastair Stewart Fernie. For services to British commercial interests in Canada.
- Terence Joseph Finney, MBE. For services to the British community and British commercial interests in the United Arab Emirates.
- The Reverend Michael William Fulljames. For services to the community in Rotterdam.
- William Fung Kwok-lun, JP. For services to commercial interests in Hong Kong.
- Professor Emma Elizabeth Harris. For services to education in Poland.
- Dr. Richard Andrew Hodges. For services to the British community in Rome.
- Mary Hunt, HM Consul-General, Paris.
- Jack Henry Jones, Overseas Development Administration Operations Manager, former Yugoslavia.
- Professor Leung Chi-keung, JP. For services to transport in Hong Kong.
- Professor Leung Ping-chung. For services to medicine in Hong Kong.
- Sophie Leung Lau Yau-fun, JP. For services to the community in Hong Kong.
- James Ian Malcolm, lately First Secretary, British Embassy, Jakarta.
- John Bonwell McLean. For services to the community in the Cayman Islands.
- Gloria Juanita McPhee. For services to the community in Bermuda.
- The Reverend Canon William John Milligan. For services to the community in Strasbourg.
- John Clark Mustardé. For services to medicine in Ghana.
- Farrer Jonathon Paul Lascelles Pallin. For services to British commercial interests in Brazil.
- Charles William Parton, First Secretary, Sino-British Joint Liaison Group, Hong Kong.
- George Trevor Keith Pitman. For services to water resource management in Bangladesh.
- Ian Francis Powell, First Secretary, British Embassy, Sana'a.
- Aidan James Smith. For services to education in Brussels.
- Vincent Smith Spring, Consultant, Accountant General's Office, Ghana.
- Adrian Peter Thomas, Director, British Council, Sudan.
- Peter James Thompson. For services to the community in Hong Kong.
- Peter Geoffrey Willoughby. For services to the law in Hong Kong.

==== Member of the Order of the British Empire (MBE) ====
Military Division

Royal Navy

- Warrant Officer Gerald Bolland, Royal Marines.
- Chief Marine Engineering Mechanic (M) Martin Russell Budgen, D130757E.
- Chief Petty Officer (Operations) (Missile) Martin William Chandler, J942317G.
- Lieutenant Commander David Chapman.
- Chief Petty Officer Wren Telephonist Susan Jane Cradock, W130997U.
- Chief Petty Officer Marine Engineering Artificer Timothy Simon John Dickens, D151362C.
- Local Corporal John Dobie, Royal Marines, PO30456K.
- Lieutenant Commander Andrew Donald Pryce Edwards.
- Lieutenant Commander Robert Ferry.
- Warrant Officer Roger Dene Forbes.
- Chief Petty Officer Airman (AH) Roger George Howes, DO70038S.
- Lieutenant Commander Stephen Mather.
- Marine Kevin Thomas Megaw, Royal Marines, PO30034T.
- Lieutenant Commander (now Commander) Andrew Clive Murgatroyd.
- Captain Roland Frederick Playford, Royal Marines.
- Warrant Officer Peter Michael Riley.
- Charge Chief Air Engineering Artificer (M) (now Sub Lieutenant) Kevin Stephen Sargent, D183281D.
- Lieutenant Commander Elliot Frazer Kingston Seatherton.
- Chief Petty Officer Air Engineering Mechanic (M) Kevin John Shaw, D107142U.
- Lieutenant Commander William Shirtliff.
- Chief Petty Officer Physical Trainer Martyn Russell Webb, D068117V.
- Lieutenant Commander Laurence Arthur Willcocks.

Army

- Major Nicholas Le Boutillier Allbeury (489481), The Prince of Wales's Own Regiment of Yorkshire.
- 24335222 Warrant Officer Class 2 Dean Oliver Allen, Royal Corps of Signals.
- 21017231 Sergeant Ronald Joseph Beards, Royal Army Medical Corps, Territorial Army (since discharged).
- 24395258 Staff Sergeant (now Warrant Officer Class 2) Thomas Arthur John Bennett, The Royal Logistic Corps.
- Captain Ronald Leslie David Booles (517054), Royal Army Medical Corps, Territorial Army.
- 24604819 Staff Sergeant Shaun Bernard Frederick Bradley, Adjutant General's Corps (SPS).
- 24257782 Warrant Officer Class 2 Andrew Duncan Carter, The Light Infantry, Territorial Army.
- Major Ombahadur Chhetri, BEM, (518683), Royal Gurkha Rifles.
- 24373318 Corporal Derek John Clayton, The King's Regiment (since discharged).
- Major Simon Aubrey Cracroft Frere-Cook (497419), The Princess of Wales's Royal Regiment.
- Major Leslie Arthur Cooke (510895), Small Arms School Corps.
- 24203108 Warrant Officer Class 1 David Leslie Cox, Grenadier Guards (since discharged).
- 24723142 Sergeant Simon Gareth Cozens, Intelligence Corps.
- Captain David Mark Cullen (513865), Royal Regiment of Artillery.
- 24791019 Corporal Mark Stephen Dale, Adjutant General's Corps (PRO).
- Captain (Acting Major) James Alphonsus Donovan (523716), The Parachute Regiment.
- Major Brian John Michael Draper (517566), The King's Royal Hussars.
- 24167390 Warrant Officer Class 2 John Drury, Royal Regiment of Artillery.
- 24736697 Sergeant Bruce Wayne Duncan, Adjutant General's Corps (SPS).
- Major Timothy John Dyer (502743), Royal Regiment of Artillery.
- 23521287 Staff Sergeant James Eaton, The Royal Logistic Corps, Territorial Army (since discharged).
- 24386243 Warrant Officer Class 2 Gary Neil Ellwood, Adjutant General's Corps (PRO) (since discharged).
- Major James Malcolm Kenneth Erskine (503803), The Black Watch.
- 24229375 Warrant Officer Class 1 Derek Bernard Evans, Adjutant General's Corps (SPS).
- Major Michael David Fogg (523097), Royal Corps of Signals.
- 24736646 Gunner Paul Stephen Furby, Royal Regiment of Artillery (since discharged).
- Major Jonathan William Garnett (502424), Royal Tank Regiment.
- 24194681 Staff Sergeant George William Grant, Adjutant General's Corps (PRO).
- Captain (Acting Major) Lalbahadur Gurung (521325), Royal Gurkha Rifles.
- 21163402 Staff Sergeant Rachhabahadur Gurung, Royal Gurkha Rifles.
- Major Michael John Henderson (520945), The Devonshire and Dorset Regiment.
- 24303333 Corporal (now Sergeant) Matthew Lawrence Hickey, The Queen's Lancashire Regiment.
- 24451461 Staff Sergeant Carl David Hodson, BEM, Adjutant General's Corps (SPS).
- Captain (Acting Major) Mark Andrew Jenkins (534069), Corps of Royal Electrical and Mechanical Engineers.
- 23653940 Warrant Officer Class 1 Brian Keenan, Corps of Royal Electrical and Mechanical Engineers, Territorial Army.
- Major Martin Patrick King (493742), The Devonshire and Dorset Regiment.
- 24234283 Warrant Officer Class 2 (Acting Warrant Officer Class 1) Keith Cornelius George Lamb, Corps of Royal Electrical and Mechanical Engineers.
- 21163989 Staff Sergeant (now Warrant Officer Class 2) Shivakumar Limbu, Royal Gurkha Rifles.
- Major Andrew Roderick Mackie (491167), The Light Dragoons.
- Captain Terence Marsh (515846), The Light Infantry, Territorial Army.
- Major Robert Martin (520973), The Green Howards.
- Major (now Lieutenant Colonel) Graham John Meacher (510355), The Royal Logistic Corps.
- 24396910 Staff Sergeant Kevin Miller, Corps of Royal Electrical and Mechanical Engineers (since discharged).
- Major Charles Robert Dobson Morpeth (507059), The Highlanders.
- Captain (now Major) Anthony James Moxon Lowther-Pinkerton, MVO, (508865), Irish Guards (dated 31 December 1990).
- 24190769 Sergeant John Cairns Porter, Corps of Royal Electrical and Mechanical Engineers.
- 24885511 Lance Corporal (now Corporal) Michael Anthony Potter, Intelligence Corps.
- W0814228 Lance Corporal Jacqueline Runciman, Adjutant General's Corps (SPS).
- Captain Joseph Alan Sandison, QGM, (526641), Grenadier Guards.
- 24553210 Sergeant Michael Smith, The Royal Logistic Corps.
- Major Bryan Stanley Smy (521271), Corps of Royal Electrical and Mechanical Engineers.
- 24162715 Warrant Officer Class 1 (now Lieutenant) Donald Stewart, Royal Army Medical Corps.
- 24531508 Staff Sergeant Gary John Stoker, Royal Corps of Signals.
- 24367919 Staff Sergeant Steven Allen Stout, The Queen's Lancashire Regiment.
- 24327800 Warrant Officer Class 2 Joseph Charles James Strachan, Royal Regiment of Artillery.
- 24536125 Warrant Officer Class 2 (now Lieutenant) John William Rugg Swanson, Adjutant General's Corps (SPS).
- Major Timothy Hugh Peter Taylor (494558), Royal Regiment of Artillery.
- 24499832 Corporal (now Sergeant) Christopher Paul Teesdale, The Queen's Dragoon Guards.
- 24236728 Warrant Officer Class 2 (now Warrant Officer Class 1) Roy Stephen Thornton, Royal Army Veterinary Corps.
- Captain Tse Chun Ying (534450), Hong Kong Military Service Corps (since retired).
- 24213352 Warrant Officer Class 1 Hugh Bagan Ward, Adjutant General's Corps (SPS) (since discharged).
- Major David Victor Watson (500311), The Princess of Wales's Royal Regiment.
- 24233616 Staff Sergeant (Acting Warrant Officer Class 2) Peter James Watts, Corps of Army Music.
- Major Lindsay Robert Wilson (495599), Royal Regiment of Artillery.
- Captain (Acting Major) Leslie Wood (535176), Royal Corps of Signals.
- Major Peter Trevor Wood (537170), Royal Army Medical Corps.
- 24457159 Warrant Officer Class 2 Peter Patrick Woods, The Royal Logistic Corps.
- Captain Terence William Worster (530318), Royal Regiment of Artillery.
- Major Thomas William Wye (519973), Corps of Royal Engineers.

Royal Air Force

- Warrant Officer Jack Thomas Abbott (W1931505), (Retired).
- Master Aircrew James Armstrong (Ml950521).
- Warrant Officer Peter Carl Robin Ayres (V4292466).
- Squadron Leader Peter Quentin Barnard (0685632).
- Flight Sergeant Michael John Benfield (A 1934280).
- Chief Technician Gordon David Browne (P8012630).
- Warrant Officer Anthony John Chaplin (B0688593).
- Squadron Leader David George Curtis (4272010), CBE.
- Junior Technician Emyr Charles Davies (C8222897).
- Squadron Leader Victor Robert Denwood (0689136).
- Squadron Leader Stephen Francis Finney (8023042).
- Squadron Leader (now Wing Commander) Francis Eric Fisher (5203009).
- Sergeant David Paul Green (R8173033).
- Flight Sergeant Neville Green (L8009222).
- Sergeant Roger Frank Grimes (V4275945).
- Squadron Leader Michael John Harwood (8027098).
- Warrant Officer Victor Edwin Ingledew, BEM, (J0595656).
- Sergeant Shaun Marc Kay, BEM, (G8019906).
- Squadron Leader Russell William La Forte (8174289), RAF Regiment.
- Squadron Leader Philip James Andrew Lobb (0209187), RAF Volunteer Reserve (Training).
- Master Aircrew Norman Alexander Macrae (R8140831).
- Squadron Leader Philip Marston (0685558).
- Flight Sergeant (now Warrant Officer) Jerzyl Mikolajewski (G1946205).
- Squadron Leader Suzanne Elizabeth Moore (8032345).
- Sergeant James Crosbie Smith (L8020551).
- Sergeant William Stanley Stabler (A8090181).
- Warrant Officer Aneurin Edward Tanner (R1948107).
- Squadron Leader Allan William Ward (5201622).
- Flight Sergeant Thomas Raymond Wilson (R4277479).
- Squadron Leader (now Wing Commander) Paul Wood (8114353).

Civil Division

- James Olusoji Olumide Abiola Aboaba. For services to the community in Leeds.
- Samuel Alfred Acheson, Clerk of Petty Sessions, Lord Chancellor's Department.
- Sheila Adey, Inspector, Her Majesty's Board of Inland Revenue.
- Philip Kojo Afful, Emergency Infrastructure Engineer. For humanitarian services in the former Yugoslavia.
- Henry Aldengrave Aitchison, Volunteer Observer, Meteorological Office, Berwickshire.
- Marjorie Albrow, President and Founder Member, Townswomen's Guild, Fareham, Hampshire. For services to the Townswomen's Guild Movement.
- Clyde Ernley Alder, Operating Manager, Upton Park Garage, London Buses Ltd. For services to the Bus Industry.
- Alan Crawford Adam Alexander, General Medical Practitioner, Dunfermline. For services to Medicine.
- Annie Allan. For services to the Girls' Brigade in Scotland.
- Hugh Allan. For services to association football.
- Robert Charles Allgrove, Head of the School of Science, Chichester College of Arts, Science and Technology. For services to Further Education.
- Margaret Ruth Andersen, Child Minder. For services to Young People in Cwmbran, Gwent.
- Irene Maud Anderson, School Crossing Patrol, Essex Police. For services to Road Safety.
- James Anderson, chairman, Visiting Committee, Barlinnie Prison. For services to Prisoner Welfare.
- John Stenhouse Anderson, Senior Scientific Officer, Defence Research Agency.
- Edith Anne Anthem. For services to the Helen House Children's Hospice, Oxford.
- Trevor Clive Arthurs, Station Officer (Retained), Gloucestershire Fire and Rescue Service.
- Merryl June Ashwood, lately Higher Executive Officer, Department of Trade and Industry.
- John Frederick Askew, Customer Service Representative, Anglian Water. For services to the Water Industry.
- Mavis Fanny Askew, chair, Crown Court Witness Scheme, Lewes, Sussex. For services to Victim Support.
- Geoffrey Aspinall. For services to Table Tennis and to the community in Oldham, Lancashire.
- Sheila Mary Atherton, School Crossing Patrol, Wigan Metropolitan Borough Council. For services to Road Safety.
- June Atkin, Warden, Morpeth Teachers' Centre, Northumberland. For services to Education.
- Colleen Atkins. For services to the Neighbourhood Watch Scheme, Bedfordshire.
- Bakhshish Singh Attwal. For services to Business and to the community in Leicester.
- Marilyn Gloria Augustus, Patients' Activities Organiser, Breconshire War Memorial Hospital. For services to Health Care in Wales.
- Florence Annie Austin, Member, British Red Cross Society, Mid-Glamorgan.
- Ada Aynsley, Administrative Officer, Department of Social Security.
- Steven James Backley. For services to Athletics.
- Ursula Edna Mary Badger. For services to the community in Windsor, Berkshire.
- Margaret Bailey, lately Countryside Ranger, Peak Park Joint Planning Board. For services to the National Parks.
- Janet Mary Bain, Macmillan Nurse Consultant, Dumfries and Galloway Royal Infirmary. For services to Health Care.
- Joyce Rhoda Baldwin, Executive Assistant, National Rivers Authority Thames Region. For services to the Water Industry.
- Eveline Barwick. For services to the community in West Yorkshire.
- Fergus Dingwall Bateson, Member, Advisory Committee on Historic Wreck Sites. For services to Conservation.
- Harry Baum, President, Spectra Travel. For services to Tourism.
- Margaret Beattie. For services to Health Care.
- Arthur Leonard Bell, Member, London Borough of Islington. For services to Local Government.
- Iris Betty Belsten, Administrative Assistant, Department of Transport.
- Livio Beltrami, Portering Manager, Moorfields Eye Hospital, London. For services to Health Care.
- Hazel Ethel Betts. For services to the community in Old Catton, Norwich, Norfolk.
- Kathleen Mabel Biggar, Prison Liaison Officer for the Samaritans and Her Majesty's Prison Service. For services to Prisoner Welfare.
- Pamela Billingham, Secretary, Avon and Somerset Constabulary.
- Mary Dorothy Birrell, Manager, Wemyss School of Needlework, Kirkcaldy. For services to Needlework.
- Robert Barnett Blair. For services to Tourism.
- Annie Margaret Bolton. For services to the community, particularly the Royal National Lifeboat Institution, in Adlington, Cheshire and Bramhall and Woodford, Cheshire.
- Mabelle Cambrai Bonner, Organiser and Treasurer, Women's Royal Voluntary Service, Lister Hospital, Stevenage, Hertfordshire. For services to Health Care.
- Donald Booker, lately Editor, Barnsley Chronicle. For services to Journalism and to the community in Barnsley.
- Malcolm Stuart Boshier, Gypsy Liaison Officer, Swale Borough Council. For services to Local Government.
- Joan Kathleen Bosley, Centre Welfare Officer, British Red Cross Society, Watchet, Somerset.
- Elizabeth Anne Bouttell, Senior Personal Secretary, Foreign and Commonwealth Office.
- Ronald Charles Bowden. For services to the community in Pelynt, Cornwall.
- Jeanne Frances Emma Bowker, Adviser, Citizens' Advice Bureau, Stratford on Avon, Warwickshire. For services to the Citizens' Advice Bureaux Movement.
- June Mary Bowles, Administrative Officer, Ministry of Defence.
- Joseph Heaney Boyd. For services to Education.
- William James Boyd, Pen Shorthand Writer. For services to the Magistracy.
- Brian Bransome, lately Team Leader, Baggage Services, Terminal 4, British Airways plc. For services to Air Transport.
- Edna Edith Bratton, Administrative Officer, Lord Chancellor's Department.
- Margaret Brave, Senior Nursing Manager, Civil Service Benevolent Fund. For services to Health Care.
- Roger Easteal Bridger, Driver, Department of the Environment.
- Peter Barry Bridges, Professional and Technology Officer, Department of the Environment.
- Ellen Brierley, Member, Oldham Metropolitan Borough Council. For services to Local Government.
- Brian James Briggs, lately Senior Administrative Officer, North West Region, National Rivers Authority. For services to the Water Industry.
- Jeffrey Thomas Bristow. For services to the community, particularly Elderly People, in Swansea, West Glamorgan.
- Michael Charles Bristow, Emergency Infrastructure Engineer. For humanitarian services in the former Yugoslavia.
- Iris Wyngate Brixton, Governor and Former Chairman of Governors, Fairfields Primary School, Basingstoke, Hampshire. For services to Education.
- Ronald James Crosher Broadbent, Honorary Secretary, Treasurer and Editor, AMSAT-UK. For services to Amateur Radio.
- Michael Leslie Brock, Consulting Engineer, BOC Ltd. For services to the Industrial Gases Industry.
- Alan Brockhurst, New Forest Verderer. For services to the New Forest.
- William Leonard Brooks, Night Telephonist, East Berkshire Community Health NHS Trust. For services to Health Care.
- Terence John Broomham, lately Principal Prison Officer, Her Majesty's Prison Maidstone.
- Florence May Steward-Brown, Market Trader, East Anglia. For services to Retailing.
- Gordon Samuel Brown, Principal Keeper, Corporation of Trinity House. For services to the Lighthouse Service in South West England and the Channel Islands.
- Edward Victor Bryant, Senior Craftsman, Ministry of Defence.
- Mary Elizabeth Gertrude Bucknell. For political service.
- Jennifer Ann Burchell, Administrative Officer, Ministry of Defence.
- Mary Isobel Burkett. For services to the League of Friends, Victoria Infirmary, Newcastle upon Tyne.
- Stanley Burrows. For services to the community.
- Arthur Eckersley Butterworth. For services to Music.
- James Alexander Cairns, Shop Manager, Atomic Weapons Establishment. For services to the Defence Industry.
- Evadney Maxine Campbell. For services to the Afro Caribbean Community in Gloucestershire.
- Emma Ruth Campbell, Adviser, Citizen's Advice Bureau, Gravesham, Kent. For services to the Citizen's Advice Bureaux Movement.
- John Colin Campbell, Trustee, Hamble Rescue, Solent Safety Organisation. For services to Life Saving and to Safety at Sea.
- James Gerard Carson. For services to Public Transport.
- Ian Archer Hamilton Carstairs, Countryside Information and Conservation Adviser. For services to Conservation.
- George Walter Carter. For services to Elderly People in Harpenden, Hertfordshire.
- Philip John MacDonald Casey, Emergency Infrastructure Engineer. For humanitarian services in the former Yugoslavia.
- Alexander Smith Cassie, lately Senior Steward, St Columba's Hospice, Edinburgh. For services to Health Care.
- Irene Elizabeth Cawley, Local Organiser, Women's Royal Voluntary Service, Pembroke Dock, Dyfed.
- Jill Margaret Cawthorne. For services to the community in Cookham Dean, Berkshire.
- Philip Dominic Chircop, Executive Officer, Department of Employment.
- Duncan Clark, Deputy Manager, Her Majesty's Board of Inland Revenue.
- Diana Lilian Clark, Training and Certification Instructor, GEC-Marconi Defence Systems. For services to the Defence Industry.
- Lavinia Jean Clarke, lately School Crossing Patrol, Coventry City Council. For services to Road Safety.
- Mary Bernadette Clarke, lately Headteacher, St Vincent's Roman Catholic Infant School, Trafford, Manchester. For services to Education.
- John Cleland, Assistant Divisional Officer, Strathclyde Fire Brigade.
- Nigel Donald Clothier, TD. For services to Newcastle City Challenge.
- Captain Maurice John Cole, Captain, Royal Research Ship Bransfield, British Antarctic Survey. For services to Marine Research in the Antarctic.
- The Reverend Canon James Oliver Colling, Rector of Warrington. For services to the community in Warrington.
- Geoffrey Collis, Head of Programme Management, Materiel, Rolls-Royce Commercial Aero Engines Ltd. For services to the Engineering Industry.
- Patrick Joseph Connolly. For services to the Dairy Industry.
- Albert Leslie Cook, chairman, Royal Air Force Association, Plymouth. For services to Ex-Servicemen and Women.
- Harry Geoffrey Cooper, Trustee, Chaseley Trust. For charitable services to Ex-Servicemen and Women.
- Clara Cope, lately School Crossing Patrol, Dudley Metropolitan Council. For services to Road Safety.
- Joan Hilary Corker, lately School Crossing Patrol, Wirral Metropolitan Borough Council. For services to Road Safety.
- Brenda Kathleen Corkill, Assistant Manager, Knowsley Co-ordinating Committee for the Handicapped, North West England.
- William Fleming Cormack. For services to Archaeology in South West Scotland.
- James Alfred Couzens, lately Principal Administrative Officer, Cambridgeshire Fire and Rescue Service.
- Murray Cowell, managing director, Murray Chauffeur Services. For services to Export.
- Richard Benedict Coyles, lately chairman, Joint Central Committee of the Police Federation of England and Wales.
- Basil John Dennis Craddock, Bailiff, County Court, Bridgend.
- Wilson Cecil Craig, Chief Inspector. For services to the Police.
- Ivor Desmond Cramer, lately Executive Officer, Department of Social Security.
- John Roger Crathorne, managing director and Chief Executive, Stoves Ltd. For services to the Domestic Appliance Industry.
- Cristina Creasy, School Crossing Patrol, Norfolk County Council. For services to Road Safety.
- Pamela Freda Cressey, General Medical Practitioner, Cambridge. For services to Medicine.
- Adrian William Thomas Cunningham, National Health and Safety Officer, Amalgamated Engineering and Electrical Union. For services to Health and Safety.
- Celia Margery Currie, Typing Supervisor, Southern Water Services. For services to the Water Industry.
- Richard Currie, Roadsweeper, Alton, Hampshire. For services to the Environment.
- Audrey Dorothy Curtis, lately Revenue Assistant, Her Majesty's Board of Inland Revenue.
- Richard W. A. Curtis, Writer. For services to Film and Television Drama and for charitable services.
- Peter Cuthell, Honorary President, Boys' Brigade 10th Company, Liverpool. For services to Young People.
- Harry William Cutler. For services to the community in Bournemouth, Dorset.
- Francis George Dance, Group Fire Control Officer, Warwickshire Fire and Rescue Service.
- Edith Darlow. For services to the community in Nechells, Birmingham.
- Allan John James Davey. For charitable services in Cardiff.
- Lieutenant Colonel David Rees Davies (Retd.), lately Senior Education Officer, Her Majesty's Prison Winchester. For services to Prisoner Welfare.
- Hilary Jane Davies, Senior Executive Officer, Ministry of Defence.
- Jonathan Davies. For services to Rugby league Football.
- Jessie Davies. For services to the Women's Royal Voluntary Service, particularly the Highgate Centre, Stockport.
- Ronald Harry Davies, General Manager, Hansard Press, Her Majesty's Stationery Office.
- David George Davis. For services to Community Relations.
- Joan Mary Dawe. For services to Journalism in Dorset.
- Cyril Bernard Dawes, Convoy Leader. For humanitarian services in the former Yugoslavia.
- Patricia Dawes, Senior Personal Secretary, Health and Safety Executive, Department of Employment.
- Hazel Ellen Day, Personal Secretary to the Chief Constable, British Transport Police.
- Terence Robert Day, Detective Constable, Metropolitan Police.
- Celia May Deacon, Convener, Royal College of Nursing, Worthing and Southlands NHS Trust. For services to Health Care.
- Doreen Dean, assistant director, British Academy of Film and Television Arts. For services to the Film and Television Industry.
- Norman Kenneth Deegan, Principal Prison Officer, Home Office.
- Norman Keith Denham. For services to Agricultural Merchanting.
- Margaret Eve Dennis, Director, Living Churchyard Project. For services to Conservation.
- Mary Helen Derrington. For services to the community in Cornwall.
- Martha Diamond. For services to the Timber Industry.
- Doris May Dibble. For services to the community, especially Health Care, in North Devon.
- Raymond Edward Dickinson, Health Care Assistant, Staunton Lodge, Newark, Nottinghamshire. For services to Health Care.
- Francis Diver. For services to Industrial Relations.
- Oswald Austen Dodds, Director of Contract Services, Northampton Borough Council. For services to Local Government.
- Sister Anna Doherty. For services to the community.
- Esther Donald. For services to the community in Corby, Northamptonshire.
- Henry Howie Donald. For services to the Scottish Central Council Branch, British Red Cross Society.
- Geoffrey Dorey, President and Chief Observer, Institute of Advanced Motorists, South London Group. For services to Motoring and to Road Safety.
- Colin Geoffrey Dove, Technical Director, Halmatic Ltd. For services to the Defence Industry.
- Raymond James Downham. For services to the community in Calne, Wiltshire.
- William Joseph Draper, Support Grade Band 1, Office of Public Service and Science, Cabinet Office.
- Avis Mary Dry, Honorary Secretary, Leeds Association for Mental Health. For services to Health Care.
- David Duff. For services to Mentally Handicapped People in Scotland.
- Ann Dufour. For services to the community in Newcastle upon Tyne.
- Malcolm Peter Dunphy, managing director, Dunphy Combustion Ltd. For services to Export.
- Jane Mary Stow Durham. For services to Heritage and to Conservation in Scotland.
- Derek Stanley Edwards, Trainer and Instructor, London Borough of Barking and Dagenham Motorcycle Training Scheme. For services to Road Safety.
- John Albert Edwards. For services to the National Association of Retired Police Officers.
- Michael Andrew Ellerker, Administrative Officer, Department of Employment.
- Austen Ernest Elliott, General Medical Practitioner, Chester. For services to Medicine.
- Peter George Elphick. For services to Architecture.
- James Alexander Emmerson, Principal Doorkeeper, House of Lords.
- William Maitland Emmerson, Executive Officer, Department of Social Security.
- Bryan John Evans, Project Manager, Design & Projects International Ltd. For services to the Defence Industry.
- Eva Evans. For services to Contemporary European Studies.
- Maureen Ann Evans. For services to Mentally and Physically Handicapped Young People.
- Elizabeth Ann Eyles. For services to the community particularly Music, in Gwent.
- Alfred Lazarus Falk, Head Porter, St Bartholomew's Medical College, University of London. For services to Education.
- Caroline Farquhar, Chief Executive, Work Wise Ltd, Glasgow. For services to Training.
- Richard Andrew Faulkner, Divisional Commandant, Special Constabulary, Humberside Police.
- Judith Ellen Feast. For services to the Armed Services community.
- James William Fennell, Emergencies Officer, CARE. For humanitarian services in Rwanda.
- J. Guthrie Heron Fenton, Vice-chairman, Scottish Seed Potato Development Council. For services to the Potato Industry.
- Christopher Summers Fenwick, deputy chairman, Youth Clubs UK. For services to Young People.
- Eleanor Ferris, Senior Personal Secretary, Department of Finance and Personnel.
- Moya Kathleen Finlay, Administrative Assistant, Department of Social Security.
- Margaret Firth. For services to Dancing in Inverness.
- Anthony Michael Fisher, Administrative Officer, Metropolitan Police.
- Roger Fitzsimmons. For services to Headway House and to Health Care.
- Patrick Francis Fleming. For services to the Brewing Industry.
- Hilda May Ford, Sales Assistant, Ronald Ford Motor Spares, Todmorden, Lancashire. For services to Motor Spares Retailing.
- William Forde. For services to the community in West Yorkshire.
- Raymond Maurice Fordham. For services to the Windyridge Probation Hostel, Colchester, Essex.
- Ian David Forsdike, Facilities Co-ordinator, Britannia Airways. For services to Aviation and to Disabled People.
- Marie Therese Frankham, Higher Executive Officer, Department of Social Security.
- Donald Brian Freeman, lately Section Chef, Principal Kitchen, House of Commons.
- Sally Sabina Friend. For services to the community in London.
- Alan William Gainham, lately Senior Executive Officer, Department for National Savings.
- Jennifer May Gason. For services to the Church and to the community in Cornwall.
- Robert Nichol Gibson, Veterinary Surgeon. For services to Veterinary Medicine.
- Thomas McEwan Gibson, Senior Executive Officer, The Patent Office, Department of Trade and Industry.
- Roland Giles, Shop Floor Manager, Siemens plc. For services to Manufacturing and Defence Industries.
- William Glenfield. For services to the community in Altrincham, Cheshire.
- Louie Kathleen Goffe. For services to the community in Shirehampton, Bristol.
- Diana Goodwin, President, Sea Cadet Corps, Richmond, Surrey.
- Elizabeth Mary Gordon. For services to the Forces Help Society and Lord Roberts' Workshops.
- Francisca Gostling, lately County Organiser, Women's Royal Voluntary Service, East Kent.
- Jeanette May Gove, lately Higher Executive Officer, Ministry of Defence.
- Janet Kirke Vanbrugh Graham, lately Member, OFWAT Southern Customer Service Committee. For services to Consumer Protection.
- Stewart Sydney Graham, lately Senior Professional and Technology Officer, Vehicle Inspectorate Agency, Department of Transport.
- Thomas Richard Graves, lately National Officer, Union of Construction, Allied Trades and Technicians. For services to Industrial Relations.
- Audrey Grazebrook. For services to the community in Blakedown, Worcestershire.
- Douglas John Green, Marketing Services Manager, Midlands Electricity plc. For services to the Electricity Industry.
- Peter Albert Green, lately Director, Durham-Lesotho Diocesan Link. For services to Anglo-Basotho Relations.
- Christopher Francis Kent Greenwood, Officer in Charge, Maumbury House Community Home for Children. For services to Child Care in Dorset.
- Doreen Gregg. For services to the community in Gilsland, Cumbria.
- Hubert Grimwood, lately Higher Executive Officer, Department of Social Security.
- Gordon Arthur John Groocock. For services to the community, particularly the Royal Society for the Prevention of Cruelty to Animals, in Warwickshire.
- Frances Claudia Grover, Accounts Manager, the Royal British Legion Poppy Factory Ltd.
- Claire Therese Gutmann. For charitable services to the Danybryn Cheshire Home, Cardiff.
- Judith Haffenden, County Organiser, Women's Royal Voluntary Service, North Yorkshire.
- John Thaw Brankston Hall, lately Information Assistant, Tyne and Wear Passenger Transport Executive. For services to Public Transport.
- Norma Irene Hall, lately Headteacher, Eldwick First School, Bradford, West Yorkshire. For services to Education.
- Dorothy Ada Halliday. For services to Elderly and Disabled People in Wantage, Oxfordshire.
- Margery Theresa Hamer-Harries. For services to the community in Bedfordshire.
- Elsie Isabel Hancock. For services to the community in Moreton, Merseyside.
- Valerie Hanson, Administrator, Northampton Soup Kitchen. For services to Homeless People in Northampton.
- John Alexander Hanvey. For services to Community Relations.
- William Harber, Security Sergeant, Group 4 Security. For services to the Highways Agency Office, Leeds.
- Doris Irene Hardie. For services on behalf of Fishermen.
- David Hardman, Emergency Infrastructure Engineer. For humanitarian services in the former Yugoslavia.
- Nancy Margaret Harper. For services to Young People in Winchester, Hampshire.
- Roger Harris, Headteacher, Watermill Primary School, Birmingham. For services to Education.
- Frances Mary Havenga, Export Director, Wright Health Group. For services to Export.
- Leanna Hayward. For services to Education.
- Robin Heaney, Leading Ranger, Forestry Commission.
- Arthur Robert Heath. For services to the Kettering Civic Society.
- Evelyn Mary Heffernan. For political and public service.
- Marjorie Edith Helps. For services to the community in Newham, London.
- Bessie Mclntosh Fenton Henderson, Personal Secretary to the Chief Executive, Dundee Teaching Hospitals NHS Trust. For services to Health Care.
- Ivy Henrick, Administrative Officer, Overseas Development Administration.
- Judith Rebecca Hereford. For political service.
- Maureen Hersee, Member, Policy Committee, British Standards Institution. For services to Consumer Protection.
- Thena Heshel (Mrs. Kendall), Producer, BBC Radio 4. For services to Radio Broadcasting for Blind People.
- Isobel Hewitt. For services to Personnel Management.
- Isobel Hamilton Hewson. For political service.
- Nicola Hicks, Sculptor. For services to Art.
- Daphne Lilian Hickson. For political service.
- Stephen Robert Hilditch. For services to Rugby Union Football Refereeing.
- Anthony Colin Hilliar, Station Officer (Retained), Wiltshire Fire Brigade.
- Norma Hindley, Personal Secretary, Advisory, Conciliation and Arbitration Service, Department of Employment.
- Dorothy Joan Hobbs, Member, Brentwood Borough Council. For services to Local Government.
- John Leslie Hockett. For services to the community in Morley, Leeds.
- Pauline Hester Winsome Hodge, Honorary Secretary, Edinburgh Ladies' Lifeboat Guild, Royal National Lifeboat Institution. For services to Safety at Sea.
- Pamela Joan Hodgkins, Fieldwork Director, National Organisation for the Counselling of Adoptees and Parents. For services to Adopted People.
- Peter Hodgson, Trident Construction Manager, Vickers Shipbuilding and Engineering Ltd. For services to the Defence Industry.
- William Henry Hogarth, Coppice Worker. For services to Forestry in the Lake District.
- Phyllis Mabel Holden, lately Support Grade Band 2, Her Majesty's Board of Customs and Excise.
- Walter Horace Holden. For services to the Royal Norfolk Regiment D-Day Veterans Association.
- John Dennis Holder. For services to Disabled People in Eastbourne, Sussex.
- Vernon Patrick Holloway, lately Member, Parole Board. For services to Prisoner Welfare.
- Susan Holman, chairman, Board of Governors, Royal Schools for the Deaf, Manchester. For services to Disabled Children.
- Major Alan Whately Holmes. For political service.
- Lawrence Robert Holmes, Observer Lieutenant, Nuclear Reporting Cell Officer, Royal Observer Corps, Truro, Cornwall.
- Lieutenant Colonel John Leonard Homfray, TD, Director of Iona Abbey Ltd. For services to Iona Cathedral.
- Margaret Winifred Rosemary Hopkinson, Typing Manager, Valuation Office Agency, Her Majesty's Board of Inland Revenue.
- Frank Ernest Horsfield, DFC. For political service.
- James Jesmond Houston, District Staff Officer, Maritime Rescue Co-ordination Centre, Coastguard Agency, Department of Transport.
- John Robert Howe, Senior Divisional Officer, Staffordshire Fire Service.
- George Frederick Howells, lately chairman, West Midlands Area Museum Service. For services to Museum Development.
- Brian Robert John Owen Hughes. For services to the community in Billericay, Essex.
- Jeffrey Spencer Hughes. For services to Education and to Crime Prevention.
- Rosaleen Hughes. For services to Health Care.
- Eric Humphrey. For services to Agricultural Workers in Kent.
- Captain Stuart Don Hunsley, Royal Navy (Retd.), lately General Manager, Royal Naval Film Corporation, Ministry of Defence.
- Warwick Charles Hunt, Volunteer Observer, Meteorological Office, Norfolk.
- Marilyn Carol Hunter. For services to the St John Ambulance Brigade.
- Ernestine Mary Hurst, Member, Lewes District Council. For services to Local Government.
- Edwin Hutchinson, Chief Executive, Derwentside Industrial Development Agency. For services to Business in Derwentside, County Durham.
- Sylvia Irene Imber, Housekeeper, Buglawton Hall, Congleton, Cheshire. For services to Education.
- Kenneth Ineson, Plastic Reel Manager, Hearl Heaton & Sons Ltd. For services to the Cable Industry.
- Thomas Lloyd Inglis, lately Assistant Head, Department of Building and Surveying, Glasgow Caledonian University. For services to Quantity Surveying.
- Joan Brogden Inskip, chairman, Waverley Family Support Service, Leonard Cheshire Foundation. For services to Elderly and Disabled People.
- Florence Caroline Irvine. For services to Training and to Young People.
- Kathleen Anne Irvine. For political and public service.
- Helen MacKay Jackson. For political and public service.
- Jennifer Ann Jackson, Administrative Officer, Ministry of Defence.
- Ronald Jackson. For services to the community in Filey, North Yorkshire.
- Anne Grace Jacques. For services to the community in Staffordshire.
- Frederick William Jakes. For services to the community in Bedfordshire.
- Mabel James. For services to the community in Braunstone, Leicester.
- Mary Primrose Burgess-James. For services to the community in Swansea, West Glamorgan.
- Ruth Vera Jewell. For services to the community in Marlow, Buckinghamshire.
- Shobana Jeyasingh, Director, Shobana Jeyasingh Dance Company. For services to Dance.
- Dennis William Daymond-John. For charitable services to the community in South East Wales.
- Jean Irene Johnson, Administrative Officer, Department of Social Security.
- Sarah Edith Johnston, Senior Executive Officer, Northern Ireland Office.
- Alan Johnstone, Dairyman. For services to the Dairy Industry in Stranraer.
- James Johnstone, Dairyman. For services to the Dairy Industry in Stranraer.
- Anthony Stewart Gervais Jones. For services to Mountain Rescue.
- Colin Jones. For services to Disabled Young People in Clwyd.
- Daniel Arthur George Jones, chairman, Birmingham Heartlands Hospital League of Friends. For services to Health Care.
- Esme Daisy Jones, Tailoress, Base Ordnance Depot, Bicester, Oxfordshire. For services to the Army.
- Evan Basil Morgan Jones, Collector in Charge, Her Majesty's Board of Inland Revenue.
- Frederick Alwyn Oliver Jones, Civilian Instructor, No. 1378 (Mold) Squadron, Air Training Corps.
- Glynwen Margaret Jones. For services to the community in Gwynedd.
- Thomas Jones, District Secretary, Transport and General Workers Union, Caernarvon. For services to Industrial Relations.
- Nestor Walter Jordan, Higher Executive Officer, Ministry of Defence.
- Zoe Ruth Edna Josephs, Historian and Writer. For services to the Jewish community in Birmingham.
- Anne Ellen Joss. For services to the Dalmellington and District Conservation Trust, Ayrshire.
- James Winton Junor. For services to the St Andrew's Ambulance Association.
- Michael Justice, lately President, Heating and Ventilating Contractors' Association. For services to Training.
- Pamela Audrey Kalms. For services to the community in London.
- Robert Andrew Kane. For charitable services.
- Davy Kaye. For charitable services.
- Frank Keighley, lately Foreman, Oughtred & Harrison (Warehousing) Ltd. For services to the Food Industry.
- Patricia Kennedy. For charitable services to humanitarian relief in Romania.
- Robert Frederick Kennedy, Fishing and Shipping Editor, Aberdeen Press and Journal. For services to Journalism.
- Barbara Marion Kenyon. For political service.
- Joan Keogh, chairman, Parents Against Drug Abuse, Wirral. For services to the Prevention of the Misuse of Drugs.
- Arfona Kersey. For services to the Citizens' Advice Bureaux Movement in Flint.
- Nazir Khan, lately Teacher of Mathematics, Hawick High School, Roxburghshire. For services to Education.
- Margaret Gillian Kinsella, Higher Executive Officer, Department of the Environment.
- John William Lewers Kitchin, lately Conservation Officer Grade D, Victoria and Albert Museum.
- Daniel George Kitts, Head, Draughting Office, Kerr-McGee Oil UK plc. For services to the Oil Industry.
- May Doris Knight. For services to the community in Claphan, Bedfordshire.
- Brenda Lacey, Secretary to the chairman, Education Committee, Birmingham City Council. For services to Local Government.
- Marjorie Clara Lacey. For services to the St Francis of Assisi Church, Strood, Kent.
- Winifred Ethel Laffan. For charitable services in Penkridge, Staffordshire.
- Ronald Arthur Lamont. For services to Education.
- Peter Bede Landles, Senior Convener, Transport and General Workers Union, Port of Felixstowe. For services to the Port of Felixstowe.
- Anthony Charles Lane, chairman, Henley Midnight Matinee Committee. For services to the community in Henley-on-Thames, Oxfordshire.
- Jennifer Lawrence, Constable, West Mercia Constabulary.
- Ann Maureen Layburn, Personal Assistant to the Chief Probation Officer, Durham. For services to Probation and to the community.
- Geoffrey Tom Layne, Organiser, Gainsborough Gateway Club, Lincolnshire. For services to Young People with Learning Difficulties.
- Miriam Robin Le Page. For services to Music in Guernsey.
- Frances Marion Leach. For services to Mobility for Disabled People.
- Catherine Millar McLaren Leah, Organiser, Meals on Wheels, Women's Royal Voluntary Service, Bath, Avon.
- William Leah. For services to the Resettlement of Offenders in Manchester.
- Louise Margaret Wathey-Leak, Secretary, Soldiers', Sailors' and Airmen's Families Association. For services to Ex-servicemen and Women.
- Margaret Lee, Administrative Officer, Ministry of Defence.
- Malcolm John Lee, Senior Craftsman, Ministry of Defence.
- Harold Lees, Support Grade Band 2, Her Majesty's Board of Customs and Excise.
- Malcolm Lees, Higher Executive Officer, Her Majesty's Board of Customs and Excise.
- Angela Lenk. For services to the Winged Fellowship.
- Paul Lewis, Export and Sales Manager, Cuprinol Ltd. For services to Export.
- W. Alan Lewis, Deputy President, Farmers' Union of Wales. For services to Agriculture.
- David Spencer Lilley, Principal, Ardentinny Outdoor Education Centre, Argyllshire. For services to Education.
- George Edward Ling, District General Manager, Sheffield, British Gas plc. For services to the Gas Industry.
- Kenneth Dyson Ling. For services to the community, especially to the Young Men's Christian Association, Yorkshire and Humberside Region, and National Council of YMCAs.
- Stuart Swain Goodman Linnell, Station Director, Mercia Sound Ltd. For services to Radio Broadcasting.
- Muriel Laura Lissemore, Administrative Officer, Department of Employment.
- Josie Livingston. For services to the community in Castlemilk, Glasgow.
- Lynne Dianne Lloyd. For services to Home Caring in Mid-Glamorgan.
- Bernard Long, Clerk, Dinnington Parish Council, Newcastle upon Tyne. For services to Local Government.
- Kenneth de Vere Lorrain. For voluntary services to Salisbury Cathedral.
- John Lough. For services to the community in Morpeth, Northumberland.
- Betty Lowe. For political and public service.
- Maureen Margaret Lowson, Local Officer 2, Department of Social Security.
- David Lynn, Surveyor, Her Majesty's Board of Customs and Excise.
- Joan Maud Lyon. For services to the community in Essex.
- Ian MacKay, lately Senior Stalker, Red Deer Commission, Scotland.
- Colin MacKinnon, Crofter. For services to Crofting.
- Anne Elizabeth MacKintosh, lately Oxfam Regional Representative, Rwanda. For humanitarian services in Rwanda.
- Roy Machin. For services to Smallbore Target Shooting in Yorkshire and Humberside.
- Captain Alistair Vass Mackay, Master of the MV Relume, Middle East Navigation Aids Service. For services to Shipping.
- Daniel McEwan Mackay, Assistant Curator, Summerlee Heritage. For services to Industrial Heritage in Scotland.
- Valentine Mackey, lately Maintenance Superintendent, Boston Sewage District, Anglian Water. For services to the Water and Sewage Industry.
- Marjorie MacLeod. For services to the Leukaemia Research Fund in Neath, West Glamorgan.
- Brian Francis Mahoney, Domestic Services Officer, Sussex Police.
- Brian John Main, Chief Engineer EH-101, Westland Group. For services to the Defence Industry.
- Geoffrey Mains, Senior Store Keeper, Intervention Board Executive Agency, Ministry of Agriculture, Fisheries and Food.
- James Heriot Anderson Manderson, lately Corporate Communications Manager, Digital Equipment Scotland. For services to the Electronics Industry and to Charities.
- Albert Israel Mann, Group Leader and Therapist, Post Natal Support Group, National Association for Mental Health, Islington. For services to Health Care.
- Kenneth William Marsh, Vice Chairman, North West (North) War Pensions Committee.
- Olivette Lilian Marsh. For services to the community in Sussex.
- Richard Hugh Marshall. For political and public service.
- Ann Mason, lately Conference Manager, National Association of Health Authorities and Trusts. For services to Health Care.
- Patricia Massey, School Crossing Warden, Isle of Man. For services to Road Safety.
- Frank Ephraim May. For charitable services in Leicester.
- Constantine McAlister. For services to the community.
- Iris Elizabeth McBride. For services to Education.
- Sylvia Hazel McCandless, Administrative Officer, Department of Agriculture.
- Mavis McCann, Private Secretary, Metropolitan Police.
- Robert James McConnell, Sergeant. For services to the Police.
- William James McConnell. For services to Rail Transport.
- Anne McCracken, lately Member, Nottingham Health Authority. For services to Health Care.
- James Spowart McCracken, General Medical Practitioner, Nottingham.
- John Joseph McDonough, Principal Prison Officer, Her Majesty's Young Offenders' Institution Portland.
- Dawn Alice McFadyen, lately Resident Warden, Gateshead Borough Council. For services to Elderly People.
- David McFarland. For services to Librarianship.
- David Winston McFaul, Reserve Constable. For services to the Police.
- Grace McGaffin. For services to Elderly People.
- John McGarvie, Personnel and Administration Officer, British Transport Police.
- Angela Elizabeth McGregor, Organiser, Women's Royal Voluntary Service, Bridge of Allan.
- James McGregor. For services to Deaf People in Scotland.
- Margaret Rose McGuiggan. For services to the Save the Children Fund.
- Cathal Joseph McKeever, Staff Officer, Department of the Environment.
- James McKellar, Principal Administration Officer, Central Scotland Police.
- William McKelvie, Support Services Manager, Mental Health Unit, East Sector, Gartloch Hospital, and North Sector, Woodlie Hospital. For services to Health Care.
- Thomas John McKnight. For services to the community.
- Barbara Marion McLean, Supervisor, Meals on Wheels, Women's Royal Voluntary Service, Paisley, Renfrewshire.
- Colin Francis McManus, QFSM, lately Commandant, Scottish Fire Service Training School.
- Rebecca McNerlin, Support Grade Band 1, Police Authority.
- George McPhee, Organist, Paisley Abbey. For services to Music.
- Douglas Robert McRae, Director of Finance, Hanover (Scotland) Housing Association Ltd. For services to Housing for Elderly People.
- James Craig Brownlie McRoberts, Foreman Stonemason, Craignethan Castle.
- Margaret Louise Meadow, Inspector. For services to the Police.
- Joseph Meechan, Forest District Manager, Forestry Commission.
- George Phoenix Meldrum. For services to Disabled People in Scotland.
- Margaret Mellor. For services to the community in Ipswich, Suffolk.
- Frank Stanley Mercer. For services to the League of Friends, Lewisham Hospital, South East London.
- Sebastian Andrew Mercer. For services to the British Korean Veterans' Association.
- James Henderson Millar, chairman, Melrose Community Council and Honorary Secretary, Eildon Housing Association. For services to the community in Melrose.
- Stanley Elwyn Millar. For services to Education and to Community Relations.
- Pauline Elizabeth Miller, Cub Scout Leader, Humberston, Grimsby, South Humberside. For services to the Scout Movement.
- Donald Joseph Millerchip, Support Grade 2, Home Office.
- William Milliken. For services to Association Football.
- Daphne Elizabeth Millward, executive director and Chief Nurse, Hastings and Rother NHS Trust. For services to Health Care.
- Alan Mitchell. For services to the community in Manchester.
- Jean Olga Mitchell. For services to the Withernsea County Infant School, North Humberside.
- Susan Carol Mitchell, Foster Carer. For services to Young People in South Glamorgan.
- George William Money, chief executive officer and Secretary, Yorkshire Co-operatives Ltd. For services to the Retail Industry.
- Arthur Dennis Moore, Consultant, Godiva Ltd. For services to Export.
- William James Moore. For services to Journalism.
- Jeanetta Ruth Stirling Home Drummond Moray, Patron, British Limbless Ex-Service Men's Association Residential Care Home, Crieff, Perthshire.
- Alan Morgan. For services to Child Safety.
- John Morgan. For services to Agriculture in Wales.
- Robert Bruce Morton, TD. For services to Community Relations.
- John Charles Moss, Chief Road Safety Officer, Cheshire County Council. For services to Road Safety.
- Henry Mott, Clerk, the Worshipful Company of Plaisterers. For services to Livery.
- Helen Brenda Mottershead. For service's to the Provision of Water in Developing Countries.
- Aubrey Duncan Motton. For charitable services to the Welsh Bone Marrow Transplant Research Fund.
- Thomas Mullan, lately Revenue Executive Officer, Her Majesty's Board of Inland Revenue.
- Richard Arnold Lewis Munson. For services to the Scout Movement in Chelmsford, Essex.
- Sheila Murphy. For political service.
- Michael Murray, General Secretary, Rossendale Union of Boot, Shoe and Slipper Operatives. For services to Industrial Relations.
- Susan Madeleine Murray. For services to the community in Sheffield.
- Frank Myers, managing director, APH Holdings Ltd. For services to Road Safety and to Export.
- Bruce James Naylor, Sergeant, Metropolitan Police.
- James Anthony Naylor, Administrative Officer, Department of Social Security.
- Emily Grace Neal, Clerk, Corhampton and Meonstoke Parish Council, Southampton, Hampshire. For services to Local Government.
- John Dunstan Newing, Director, St Peter's Urban Village, Saltley, Birmingham. For services to the community in Saltley.
- Iris Newman, School Crossing Patrol, Birmingham City Council. For services to Road Safety.
- Leonard Newman, Foster Parent, West Sussex. For services to Young People.
- Lydia Barbara Newman, Foster Parent, West Sussex. For services to Young People.
- Roy Edwin Norgrove. For services to the community particularly the Royal National Lifeboat Institution, in Farnham, Surrey.
- George Norrie, Member, Angus District Council. For services to the community in Angus.
- Jesse William Norris. For services to Bowling and to the community in Hawkhurst, Kent.
- James Edward O'Neil. For services to Weetabix Ltd and to the community in Northamptonshire.
- Gilbert Oldershaw, Honorary Treasurer, National Federation of Small Businesses Ltd. For services to Business.
- Rachel Margaret Priestley Ollard. For services to the community in Binbrook, Lincolnshire.
- Leonard Leslie Hubert Vale-Onslow, Motor Cycle Mechanic, Sparkbrook, Birmingham. For services to Motor Cycle Repair.
- Lisa Jane Opie. For services to Squash.
- Maureen Orde, assistant director, British Road Federation. For services to Road Transport.
- Elsie Orme, Non-Executive Director, Jowitt Grinding Wheels Ltd. For services to Business in Sheffield.
- Dorothy Mary Owen. For services to the Development of Archives.
- Glyn Owen. For services to Local Government in Wales.
- Glyn Alun Owen, Regional Secretary, North Wales Coal Merchants' Federation. For services to the Coal Retail Industry.
- John Anthony Owen, Scout Leader, Eltham, London. For services to the Scout Movement.
- Ronald Edward Bryan Owen, Director of Finance and Administration, Relate. For services to Marriage Guidance.
- Edith Oxnard. For services to the Citizens' Advice Bureau, Dewsbury, West Yorkshire.
- Peter Albert Page, lately Gardener, Royal Hospital School, Holbrook, Suffolk. For services to Horticulture and to the community in Holbrook.
- Lawrence Vivien Palfreeman. For services to St Paul's Parish Church, Birkenshaw, West Yorkshire.
- Daphne Stella Palmer, Librarian, Food and Drink Federation. For services to the Food Industry.
- Buddhdev Pandya, Director, Bedford Racial Equality Council. For services to the ethnic community in Bedfordshire.
- Josephine Margaret Parker, Control Manager, Water Supply (Provinces), Thames Water. For services to the Water Industry.
- Margaret Anne Parker, Tower Captain, Nettleham Church, Lincoln. For services to Bell Ringing in Lincolnshire.
- Elizabeth Parkinson, Support Grade Band 1, Department of Social Security.
- John James Parry. For services to the community in Clwyd, North Wales.
- Mary Ann Duncan Paterson, Caretaker, Collieston Community Centre. For services to the community in Collieston, Aberdeenshire.
- Christopher Key Patey. For services to Sponsorship of the Arts in Scotland.
- Muriel Winifred Patterson. For services to Prisoner Welfare.
- Winifred Molly Patterson. For services to the Save the Children Fund in Harrogate.
- John William Pearce, Business Manager, Future Frigate Marconi Radar Control Systems Ltd. For services to the Electronics Industry.
- Tony Charles Peck. For services to Scouting in Canvey Island, Essex.
- Jocelyn Ann Peck. For services to Scouting in Canvey Island, Essex.
- Kathleen Betty Pedley. For services to the community in Hereford.
- Moira Ann Peebles, County Librarian, Berkshire. For services to Librarianship.
- Barbara Christine Perez. For services to the Traveller Education Service.
- David Thomas Perks, Constable, Metropolitan Police.
- Edward Ernest Perks, Convey Leader. For humanitarian services in the former Yugoslavia.
- Michel Marie Clement Perombelon, lately Senior Bacteriologist, Scottish Crop Research Institute. For services to Science.
- Dorcas Perry. For services to the community in Chew Magna, Bristol.
- Gerald Arthur Petty, chairman, Hampshire, Berkshire and Surrey War Pensions Committee.
- David Douglas Phipps, lately Retired Officer 2, Ministry of Defence.
- Peter Harold Jeffrey Pittam. For services to the community in Leeds.
- Frank Plant, lately Member, Committee of Management, the Benevolent Fund of the Employment Department Group. For charitable services.
- Frank Vernon Pocklington. For services to the community in Leicester.
- Captain David Irvine Polson, Harbour Master, Lerwick, Shetland. For services to the Port Industry.
- Stephanie Potter, Committee Clerk, Town Clerk's Office. For services to the Corporation of London.
- Edith Ivy Potts, Warden, St Cross Court, Newport. For services to Elderly People in Newport, Isle of Wight.
- John Denis Potts, Member, Richmondshire District Council. For services to Local Government.
- Pamela Percival Powell. For services to Health Care Bridgend, Mid Glamorgan.
- Phillip Percival James Powell. For services to the community in Hereford.
- Elizabeth Thomson Prentice, Area Typing Manager, Her Majesty's Board of Inland Revenue.
- Frederick William Price. For services to the Church of England and to the Electrical Industry.
- George Stanley Priestly For services to the community in Hurworth, Darlington.
- Austin Leslie Pritchard. For services to Local Government in Powys.
- Maurice Pritt, lately Welfare Officer, British Nuclear Fuels plc. For services to the Nuclear Industry.
- Isabel Joan Puddy. For services to Disabled Children in Wiltshire.
- William Dennis Puddy, TD. For services to Disabled Children in Wiltshire.
- Joan Quine. For services to the community on the Isle of Man.
- William Joseph Quinn, Member, North West (South) War Pensions Committee.
- Usha Emma Rathod, Deputy Manager, Citizens' Advice Bureau, Horsham, Sussex. For services to the Citizens' Advice Bureaux Movement.
- Eleanor Rawling. For services to Geography Education.
- Austin Charles Reeves, Project Engineer, Coventry City Council and for services to Deaf People.
- Campbell Reid, board member, Offshore Petroleum Industry Training Organisation. For services to Training.
- Ronald Reid, Constable, Lothian and Borders Police.
- Douglas Revell, lately chair, Age Concern, Hull. For services to the community in Hull, Humberside.
- June Ellen Agnes Rice, Personal Secretary, Ministry of Defence.
- William Henry Rice, lately Joiner, Department of the Environment.
- Leslie Douglas Rickman. For services to the Salvation Army in Plymouth, Devon.
- Mary Ellen Riggall. For services to the community in Hemmington, Peterborough, Cambridgeshire.
- John Adrian Ringland, Chief Superintendent. For services to the Police.
- Alistair James Ritchie, Supervisory Technician, Fraserburgh Academy, Aberdeenshire. For services to Education.
- John Kincaid Robb. For services to the community in Yorkshire.
- David Stanley Roberts. For charitable services in Clwyd.
- Edith Roberts, Communications Officer 4, Ministry of Defence.
- Sarah Eurwen Roberts, Senior Nurse, Builth Wells Cottage Hospital, Powys. For services to Health Care.
- Sandra Georgina Roberts, Enrolled Nurse, Wirral Hospitals Trust, Merseyside. For services to Health Care.
- Thomas Richard Roberts, chairman, Montford Parish Council, Shropshire. For services to Local Government.
- Aileen Janette Robertson, Higher Executive Officer, Independent Tribunal Service.
- David Robinson, Detective Constable, Durham Constabulary.
- June Elisabeth Robinson. For services to the community in Buckinghamshire.
- Neil Robinson, Chief Executive, Northgate and Prudhoe NHS Trust. For services to People with Learning Disabilities in Northumberland.
- Leslie Robson, Inshore Lifeboat Helmsman, Flamborough Lifeboat Station, Royal National Lifeboat Institution. For services to Safety at Sea.
- Thomas William Rodgers, Commandant, Special Constabulary, Essex Police.
- Shirley Rogers, lately Support Manager 2, Department of Trade and Industry.
- William Bryan Rogerson, Officer in Charge, British Transport Police, Bangor, Wales.
- Lynne Christine Rose. For charitable services to the Employment of Disabled People.
- John Malcolm Thomas Ross. For political and public service.
- Joy Dorothy Ross. For services to the community, especially Young People, in Sutton, Surrey.
- Kennedy Murray Ross. For services to Community Service Volunteers Education.
- Margaret MacLennan Ross, Executive Officer, Ministry of Defence.
- Sherlene Diana Rudder, Counselling Family Visitor (Genetics), North West Thames Regional Genetic Service, Northwick Park Hospital, London. For services to Health Care.
- Peter Alan Ruffles, Teacher, Broxbourne Comprehensive School, Hertfordshire. For services to Education.
- James Francis Ryan. For services to the community in Wales.
- John Gerard Ryan, Constable, Thames Valley Police.
- David Norman Sadler, Branch Training Officer, British Red Cross Society, Kent.
- Derek Ernest John Salmon, lately DS Grade 6, Foreign and Commonwealth Office.
- John Charles Salter, lately Team Manager, Social Services Department, Norfolk County Council. For services to Local Government.
- Hazel Norma Savage, Detective Constable, Gloucestershire Constabulary.
- Richard John Scammell, Racing Director, Cosworth Engineering. For services to Motor Racing Engineering.
- Grizel Elizabeth Catherine Sclater, Personal Secretary to the Clerk, House of Commons.
- Neil Scobie, Janitor, Dailly Primary School, Ayrshire. For services to Education.
- Mary Scott, Headteacher, St Aloysius Primary School, Glasgow. For services to Education.
- Roy Ian Scruton, Constable, Humberside Police.
- Kenneth Ronald Scudamore, lately National Chairman, British Polio Fellowship.
- Raja Seetharamaiah Suryanarayan Setty, Associate Specialist in Medicine for the Elderly in Lancashire. For services to Medicine.
- Roy John Sexton, Administrative Assistant, Department for Education.
- Mary Virginia Seymour, lately Senior Personal Secretary, Lord Chancellor's Department.
- Freda Annette Shadwell. For services to Over Wallop Parish Council, Hampshire.
- David Ivor Sharp, Member, British Red Cross Society, Wincanton, Somerset.
- Annis Joan Shaw, Honorary Vice President, British Red Cross Society, Clwyd.
- Sylvia Claire Sheff. For services to the community in Manchester.
- Douglas Sherry. For services to the community in London.
- Peter Short, lately Branch Secretary, Union of Democratic Mineworkers, British Coal Corporation. For services to Industrial Relations.
- Robert Stephen Short, Chief Commandant, Special Constabulary, Dorset.
- Yvonne Shuttleworth. For political service.
- John Christopher Simmons, Chairman of Governors, Baines Secondary School, Poulton Le Fylde, Lancashire. For services to Education.
- Jaswant Singh. For services to the ethnic community in Cardiff.
- Allen Frederick Skinmore. For humanitarian services in Rwanda.
- Derek Peter Smith, Support Technician, Engine Control Systems, Lucas Aerospace Ltd. For services to the Aerospace Industry.
- Fernley Robert Smith, President, National Council of Hotels Associations. For services to Tourism.
- Harry Smith, lately Station Officer (Retained), Lancashire County Fire Brigade.
- Hugh Delaine-Smith, managing director, Delaine Coaches Ltd. For services to Public Transport.
- Kenneth Lawrence Smith. For services to the community in Christchurch, Dorset.
- Montague Garry Smith, Administrator, Wightwick Manor, Wolverhampton. For services to the National Trust.
- Nicola Patricia, Mrs Smith. For services to Bridge.
- Reginald John Smith, Logistics Engineer, British Aerospace Defence (Dynamics). For services to Industrial Relations and to the community in Stevenage, Hertfordshire.
- Winifred Anne Smith, National Poultry Specialist (Eggs), National Farmers' Union. For services to the Poultry Industry.
- Pauline Betty Snow. For political service.
- Alec Dudley Mott Sorrell. For services to the community in Middlesex.
- Elsie May Sparkes. For services to the community in Sandford, Devon.
- David James Speed. For services to the community in Pontyclun, South Wales.
- Paul Fairless Staines, Member, Farm Animal Welfare Council. For services to Animal Welfare.
- David John Stanbury, chairman, Field Studies Council. For services to Environmental Education and Conservation.
- Wendy Maureen Start, Consultant, Geoffrey E. Macpherson Ltd. For services to the Textile Industry.
- Anne Stevens. For services to the Ashmolean Museum, Oxford.
- Hannah Florence Margaret Stirling, President, Friends of Loch Lomond Society. For services to Conservation.
- Marjorie Stone, National Vice Chairman, Alzheimer's Disease Society. For services to Health Care.
- Victoria Ann Stone, Organiser, Learn and Live Campaign, West Midlands. For services to Road Safety.
- William Frank Stow. For services to Windlesham Parish Council, Surrey.
- Benjamin John Streatfield, Mayor's Attendant, Margate, Kent. For services to Local Government.
- Sheila Mary Strutt. For services to the community in Westerham, Kent.
- Joyce Kathleen Sturch. For services to the community in Burford, Oxfordshire.
- Johannes Michael Surkamp, Principal, Ochil Towers School, Auchterarder, Perthshire. For services to Education.
- Eleanor Beatrice Sykes. For voluntary services to the community in Manchester.
- Kenneth Leslie Sykes. For charitable services in Wakefield, West Yorkshire.
- Dhanjibhai Devji Tanna. For services to the community in North London.
- Alec Colin Taylor. For political and public service.
- Jean Ann Taylor, Administrative Officer, Ministry of Defence.
- John Melvin Taylor, Engineering and Transport Officer, Divisional Officer (Grade II), Lancashire County Fire Brigade.
- Robert William Taylor. For services to Education and to Young People.
- Arthur Stanley Terrell, Vice President, League of Friends, Royal Eye Infirmary, Plymouth. For services to Health Care.
- Edith Marie Thomas, Divisional Officer, St John Ambulance Brigade, Cardiff.
- Mary Alwyne Thomas. For services to Netball.
- Neil Roderick Thomas. For services to Gymnastics.
- Patricia Thomas, Administrative Officer, Ministry of Defence.
- Patricia Ann Thomas, Leading Fire Control Operator, Dyfed County Fire Brigade.
- Ronald Thomas, chairman, Ashton Keynes Parish Council, Swindon, Wiltshire. For services to Local Government.
- Allan Thompson, Chief Engineer, Radio Branch, Lancashire Constabulary.
- Geoffrey Thompson. For services to Sport, particularly Karate.
- Joan Denison Thompson. For services to Visually Disabled People in Buckinghamshire.
- Margaret Rebecca Thoms. For services to the community in Blackpool.
- Mary Ophelia Thornley. For services to Music in Leicestershire.
- Thomas Ransford Tingling, Higher Executive Officer, Department of Employment.
- Shirley Margaret Tucker, lately Higher Grade Cartographic Draughtsman, Welsh Office.
- Beryl Tullett, lately Secretary to the Editor, Navy News. For services to the Navy.
- Rex Alfred Turner. For services to the League of Friends, Pembury Hospital, Kent.
- John Twells, chairman, Midland Railway Charitable Trust. For services to Railway Preservation.
- William Edward Underwood. For services to the community in Hornsea, Humberside.
- Michael Anthony Uttley, Headteacher, Dalton Listerdale Primary School, Rotherham, Yorkshire. For services to Education.
- Bernard Percival Venables. For services to Angling.
- Edwin Norman Vidler, Secretary, Tax Technical Committee, Institute of Chartered Accountants in England and Wales. For services to Accountancy.
- Arsinoe Wainhouse, President, Senior and Junior Section, Leamington Spa, Warwick and Kenilworth Anglo-French Society. For services to Anglo-French Relations.
- Robert Wallace, Caulker, Vosper Thornycroft (UK) Ltd. For services to Industrial Relations.
- Edward Walton. For services to the community in Northumberland.
- Albert Sidney Ward, Driver, Highways Section, Rochester-upon-Medway District Council. For services to Local Government.
- Colin Ernest Warder. For services to the community in Dunmow, Essex.
- Betty Violet Warren, Support Manager 3, Department of Health.
- Margery Irene Waterman. For services to the community in Birmingham.
- Jennifer Ann Watling, Executive Officer, Department of Social Security.
- Philip John Watson, Sub-Divisional Officer, Hampshire Special Constabulary.
- Barbara Louisa Watts, Administrative Officer, Ministry of Defence.
- Maimie Waugh. For services to Action Multiple Sclerosis.
- Kathleen Webber, Personal Secretary to the Chaplain General, Ministry of Defence.
- Robert William Weir, Farmer. For services to Agriculture.
- Leonard West, lately Caretaker, Rectory Paddock School and Research Unit, Orpington, Kent. For services to Education.
- Patrick Arthur White, Director, Research and Development, Courtaulds Fibres Tencel. For scientific services to the Textile Industry.
- Susan White. For services to the Butchers and Drovers Charitable Institution.
- Gordon Stewart Whyte. For services to the Welsh National Opera.
- Margaret Winifred Wiggett, School Crossing Patrol, Luton, Bedfordshire. For services to Road Safety.
- William Scrimger Wilkie. For services to the All Scotland Accordion and Fiddle Festival.
- Douglas Wilkins, Carpenter and Handyman, Chequers Estate. For services to the Chequers Estate.
- Edward Ralph Wilkins, Purchasing Officer, Institute of Arable Crops Research, Long Ashton, Bristol. For services to Science.
- Joan Mary Wilkins. For services to the community in Compton, Berkshire.
- James Roy Wilkinson. For charitable services in Lanarkshire.
- Rowena Mary Wilkinson, Senior Executive Officer, Ministry of Defence.
- Geoffrey Albert Williams, Secretary, West Mercia Police Federation Joint Branch Board.
- Reginald Williams, Divisional Officer, St. John Ambulance Brigade, Wrexham, Clwyd.
- Winifred Dorothy Wilmington. For services to the community in Somerset.
- Ann Rosemary Wilson. For services to Young People with Specific Learning Difficulties.
- Geoffrey Joseph Wilson, lately Buildings Officer, London School of Economics. For services to Education.
- Randle Herford Wilson. For political service.
- Robert Francis Wilson, Principal Technical Officer, Quality Control (Central Stores), Boots Contract Manufacturing, Boots Company plc. For services to Stores Management.
- Edward Henry Windross. For services to Army Transport.
- Maureen Janis Winter, Higher Executive Officer, Home Office.
- Annie Mollie Wood, lately Court Usher, Mark Cross Magistrates' Court, Rotherfield, East Sussex. For services to the Magistracy.
- Rachel Nina Wood, President, Guernsey Association for the Blind. For services to Blind People.
- Derek James Woodward, Governor 4, Her Majesty's Prison Swaleside.
- Augustus Edwin Charles Worledge, lately Superintendent of Works, South East Territorial, Auxiliary and Volunteer Reserve Association.
- Denis Frederick Barker Wright. For services to the community in Littlebury, Essex.
- Douglas Stewart Wright, Director, Keep Scotland Beautiful. For services to Environmental Protection.
- Margaret Judith Wright. For services to the Royal Institution.
- Graham William Yates, Services Controller Centrewest, London Buses Ltd. For services to Public Transport.

Diplomatic Service and Overseas List

- Beryl Baker. For medical services to the community in Paraguay.
- Jacqueline Anne Barson, lately Second Secretary, British Embassy, Athens.
- Pamela Doris Barton. For services to animal welfare in Hong Kong.
- Geoffrey Anthony Beaumont, lately European Community Monitor Mission in former Yugoslavia.
- Hugh Michael Bell. For welfare services to the British community in Switzerland.
- Lindsay Bernard Board. For services to the community in Southern France.
- George Haig Bodden, Member of the Legislative Assembly, Cayman Islands.
- Jean Bowskill, Matron, British High Commission Medical Centre, New Delhi.
- Richard Cunningham Campbell. For services to British commercial interests in Colombia.
- Chan Hon-yui, Clerical Officer, Immigration Department, Hong Kong.
- Patrick Alexander Chichester. For services to mine clearance in Kuwait.
- Chong Chan-yau, Director, Oxfam Hong Kong.
- Chu Hak-kong Victor, Chief Immigration Assistant, Hong Kong.
- Alfred Chui Wing-man, JP, lately assistant director of Social Welfare, Hong Kong.
- Lesley Caroline Craig, Vice Consul, British Embassy, Kathmandu.
- Hugh Ross Cran. For services to the British community in Kenya.
- Elizabeth Margaret McDowell Crawford. For services to education in Israel.
- Patricia Crossley. For services to education in Angola.
- James Murray Cunningham, Library Assistant, British High Commission, Canberra.
- Kenneth Ronald Dagnall, Honorary Consul, Le Havre.
- John Michael Daniel, lately Manager, Lloyd's Register of Shipping, Turkey.
- Brian Thomas Darke. For services to the Royal Air Forces Association, Luxembourg.
- Sylvia Dennergren, lately Information Officer, British Embassy, Stockholm.
- Antonia Mary Derry, Field Director, Save the Children Fund, Nepal.
- Edith May Dodd. For services to the community in Southern Portugal.
- Michael David Downham. For medical services to the community in Sierra Leone.
- Brian James Arthur Evans. For services to the British community in Egypt.
- Anthony Francis George Foulger. For services to the community in the United Arab Emirates.
- Dorothy Guy. For services to the British community in Brussels.
- Peter Harrison. For services to natural history.
- Ian David Hays. For services to education in Angola.
- Raymond Ho Chau-cheung, Senior Clerical Officer, Royal Hong Kong Police Force.
- Dr. Norman Robert Honey, Medical and Health Officer, Hong Kong.
- Miloch Peter Ilitch, chairman, Aircrew Association, Paris.
- Rosanna Caroline Dyer-Innis. For welfare services to the community in Montserrat.
- Dr. George Michael Fingland Jeffs. For services to the environment.
- Ko Woo Shin-ching Patricia, lately Chief Nursing Officer, Department of Health, Hong Kong.
- Carol Anne Le Dug, Administration Officer, Afghanaid.
- Frank Alfred Moorman Lees. For services to British education links in Australia.
- Leung Yau-yam, Senior Principal Trade Controls Officer, Customs and Excise Service, Hong Kong.
- Keith Raynor Lewis, Police Training Adviser, Sierra Leone.
- Li Fung-ying, Vice Chairman, Federation of Hong Kong and Kowloon Labour Unions.
- Elizabeth Susan Mair. For services to sport in Hong Kong.
- Helen Maria Mann, Vice-Consul, British Consulate-General, Houston.
- Sister Maureen McGinley. For medical and welfare services to the community in Hong Kong.
- Andrew McNab, Direct Teaching Operations Manager, British Council, Seoul.
- Fay Miriam Morris, Honorary British Consul, Eilat.
- Antoine Xuan Tinh Nguyen, Principal Executive Officer, General Grades Office, Hong Kong.
- Ann Margaret Oakford, lately Commercial Information Officer, British Consulate-General, Sydney.
- Nicholas Octave, Driver, British High Commission, St. Lucia.
- Caroline Pickering. For welfare services in Kenya.
- David Albert Pindred, lately Security Officer, Office of the United Kingdom Permanent Representative to the European Union, Brussels.
- Albert Andrew Poggio. For services to the community in Gibraltar.
- Brigadier Oliver Gartside Pratt, lately Instructor, Danish Army Officers' School.
- Phyllis Molly Read. For services to the poor in Bangladesh.
- David Paul Ridley. For services to British commercial interests in Korea.
- Terence Alan Robbins, lately Senior Superintendent, Swaziland Police.
- Alison Ruth Rogers, Personal Secretary, British Embassy, Maputo.
- Gilbert Richard Martin Rogers, Commercial Officer, British Consulate-General, Düsseldorf.
- Eric William Alfred Rowbottom. For services to the community in Gibraltar.
- John Gustaaf Roman Karel Sanderson, Commercial Officer, British Embassy, Brussels.
- Carlos Santos, Principal Community Care Officer, Gibraltar.
- Rusy Motabhoy Shroff, chairman, Hong Kong Tuberculosis, Chest and Heart Disease Association.
- Siu Tsang Fung-kwan. For welfare services to the community in Hong Kong.
- Roy Spencer, JP, lately Secretary, Urban Council, Hong Kong.
- John Basil Stocker. For services to English language teaching in Korea.
- Tang Kwok-kee, lately Principal Government Engineer, Hong Kong.
- Hilary Thompson. For services to the community in Belgium.
- Peter Adye Tomkins. For services to the community in the Cayman Islands.
- Marjorie Jennifer Tustian. For services to the poor in Uganda.
- Johnny Wan Chung-yiu, Senior Executive Officer, Highways Department, Hong Kong.
- Joan Margaret Williams, Protocol Officer, Bermuda Government.
- Kenneth Berkeley Wills. For services to education in Malawi.
- Nora Wong Pui-ha, General Secretary, Hong Kong Association for the Mentally Handicapped.
- Sylvia Mary Wright. For medical services to the poor in South India.
- Gibson Ward Young. For services to the community in Bermuda.

=== Royal Red Cross (RRC) ===
- Lieutenant Colonel Oliver Steven Barnes (494500), Queen Alexandra's Royal Army Nursing Corps.

==== Associate of the Royal Red Cross (ARRC) ====
- Q1013690 Staff Sergeant (now Captain) Pauline Freda MacDonald, Queen Alexandra's Royal Army Nursing Corps.
- Sergeant Richard William Hilling (T0595331), Royal Air Force.

=== Queen's Police Medal (QPM) ===
England and Wales

- Alan Amos, Constable, West Yorkshire Police.
- Michael John Argent, Chief Constable, North Wales Police.
- John Collins Arnold, Superintendent, Northumbria Police.
- David William Baker, Chief Superintendent, Leicestershire Constabulary.
- Donald Buchanan, Commander, Metropolitan Police.
- Leslie Bullamore, Constable, Metropolitan Police.
- Anthony Thomas Burden, Chief Constable, Gwent Constabulary.
- Gordon William Burton, Chief Superintendent, Greater Manchester Police.
- David Martin Cansdale, Assistant Chief Constable, Hertfordshire Constabulary.
- William Ian Ridley Johnston, Assistant Commissioner, Metropolitan Police.
- Albert Kirby, Detective Superintendent, Merseyside Police.
- Alan Gerald Marlow, lately Chief Superintendent, Bedfordshire Police.
- David Edward Perry, Inspector, Essex Police.
- Keith Anthony Portlock, Deputy Chief Constable, Devon and Cornwall Constabulary.
- Brian David Ridley, Detective Chief Superintendent, Metropolitan Police.
- Colin Riley, Deputy Chief Constable, Cumbria Constabulary.
- Alan Richard Smith, Detective Constable, Avon and Somerset Constabulary.
- David Richard Winser, Assistant Chief Constable, Cambridgeshire Constabulary.

Northern Ireland

- Eric William Anderson, Chief Superintendent, Royal Ulster Constabulary.
- John Derek Martindale, Chief Superintendent, Royal Ulster Constabulary.

Scotland

- Douglas James Keil, Constable, Grampian Police.
- James Richardson, Deputy Chief Constable, Strathclyde Police.
- John Victor Urquhart, Chief Superintendent, Strathclyde Police.

Overseas

- Anthony John Ferrige, Assistant Commissioner, Royal Hong Kong Police.
- David Martin Hodson, Chief Superintendent, Royal Hong Kong Police.
- Kevin McCann, Deputy Commissioner, Royal Cayman Islands Police.
- Benjamin William Munford, Assistant Commissioner, Royal Hong Kong Police.
- George Alexander Adams Murphy, Chief Superintendent, Royal Hong Kong Police.

=== Queen's Fire Services Medal (QFSM) ===
England and Wales

- Graham George Edwards, Chief Fire Officer, Cornwall Fire Brigade.
- John Harold Herrick, Chief Fire Officer, Lincolnshire Fire Brigade.
- Jeffrey Ord, Chief Fire Officer, Northumberland Fire Service.
- Barry Sandham, Assistant Divisional Officer, Lancashire Fire Brigade.
- Mervyn John Sheldon, Chief Fire Officer, South Glamorgan Fire Service.

Scotland

- Derek Shepherd Marr, Firemaster, Tayside Fire Brigade.

Overseas

- Wong Man-Chiu, Chief Fire Officer, Hong Kong Fire Service.

=== Colonial Police Medal (CPM) ===
- Chan Po-kwong, Superintendent, Royal Hong Kong Police Force.
- Peter Chan Wai-chi, Senior Superintendent, Royal Hong Kong Police Force.
- Cheung Chi-shum, Chief Superintendent, Royal Hong Kong Police Force.
- Choy Lim-lai, Principal Fireman, Hong Kong Fire Service.
- Steven Ford, Superintendent, Royal Hong Kong Police Force.
- Fung Fai-ming, Principal Fireman, Hong Kong Fire Service.
- Gordon Fung Siu-yuen, Senior Superintendent, Royal Hong Kong Police Force.
- Ho Kwok-yui, Senior Station Officer, Hong Kong Fire Service.
- Kai Wing-hoi, Station Sergeant, Royal Hong Kong Police Force.
- Lau Wah-on, Superintendent, Royal Hong Kong Police Force.
- Robert Lee Chi-yuen, Senior Superintendent, Royal Hong Kong Police Force.
- Christine Lee Hui Ngan-fun, Senior Superintendent, Royal Hong Kong Police Force.
- Stephen Lee Man-yick, Superintendent, Royal Hong Kong Auxiliary Police Force.
- Lee Mui-lam, Senior Divisional Officer, Hong Kong Fire Service.
- Leung Ka-hung, Superintendent, Royal Hong Kong Police Force.
- Liu Si-yung, Station Sergeant, Royal Hong Kong Police Force.
- Lo Chi-wa, Station Sergeant, Royal Hong Kong Police Force.
- Lui Kwok-fai, Superintendent (Ambulance), Hong Kong Fire Service.
- Morgan Alan Philip Majurey, Senior Superintendent, Royal Hong Kong Police Force.
- David Wilfred Frederick O'Brien, Superintendent, Royal Hong Kong Police Force.
- Kerry Stanton Pearce, Senior Superintendent, Royal Hong Kong Police Force.
- Jeremy Clive Skinner, Senior Superintendent, Royal Hong Kong Police Force.
- David Graham Thomas, Senior Superintendent, Royal Hong Kong Police Force.
- Tse Chan-fai, Senior Superintendent, Royal Hong Kong Police Force.
- Anthony Charles William Wimbush, Superintendent, Royal Hong Kong Police Force.

== Cook Islands ==
=== Order of the British Empire ===
==== Officer of the Order of the British Empire (OBE) ====
Civil Division

- The Honourable Ngereteina Puna. For services to the community.

==== Member of the Order of the British Empire (MBE) ====
Civil Division

- Mata-a-te-ii-Kava Taruia Utanga. For services to the community.

=== British Empire Medal (BEM) ===
Civil Division

- Manarangi Tepou O-Te-Rangi Nicholas. For services to the community.

== Bahamas ==
=== Order of Saint Michael and Saint George ===
==== Dame Commander of the Order of St Michael and St George (DCMG) ====
- Senator The Honourable Dr. Ivy Leona Dumont. For social, educational and political services.

==== Companion of the Order of St Michael and St George (CMG) ====
- Dr. Keva Maria Bethel. For services to education and the community.

=== Order of the British Empire ===
==== Commander of the Order of the British Empire (CBE) ====
Civil Division

- Arthur Benson Barnett. For public and political services and service as a hospitality executive.

==== Officer of the Order of the British Empire (OBE) ====
Civil Division

- The Reverend Dr. Edison Etienne Everette Bowleg. For services to religion and the community.
- Clarice Sinclair Sands-Granger. For community service, particularly to the Girl Guide Movement.
- The Reverend Dr. Charles Clifford Smith. For services to religion and the community.

==== Member of the Order of the British Empire (MBE) ====
Civil Division

- Captain Garnett Austin Archer. For community service.
- Harcourt Neville Brown, JP. For community service.
- Winston Roosevelt Cooper. For services to the development of Junkanoo Arts.
- Percival Earle Francis. For services to the development of Junkanoo Arts.
- Edward Kenneth Sawyer. For community service.

=== British Empire Medal (BEM) ===
Civil Division

- Marjorie Williams Bain. For services to nursing.
- Patricia Melvina Bethel. For services to nursing.
- Joseph Benjamin Carroll. For community service.
- Captain Ernest Alexander Dean. For community service.
- Liefred Walton Johnson. For public service.
- Isabella Johnson-Pratt. For services to nursing.
- Hartman Caleb Moncur. For community service.
- Icelyn Marie Pratt. For services to nursing.
- Eva Augusta McPherson Williams. For community service.
- Bishop William Levi Wilson. For community service.

== Grenada ==
=== Order of Saint Michael and Saint George ===
==== Companion of the Order of St Michael and St George (CMG) ====
- Royston Oliver Hopkin. For services to the hotel industry.

=== Order of the British Empire ===
==== Officer of the Order of the British Empire (OBE) ====
Civil Division

- Joseph Samuel Budd. For services to the Blind Welfare Association.

==== Member of the Order of the British Empire (MBE) ====
Civil Division

- Roma Josephine Finlay. For services to social work.

== Papua New Guinea ==
=== Order of the British Empire ===
==== Knight Commander of the Order of the British Empire (KBE) ====
Civil Division

- Zibang Zurenuoc. For community services.

==== Commander of the Order of the British Empire (CBE) ====
Civil Division

- Gabriel John Klero Dusava. For public service.

==== Officer of the Order of the British Empire (OBE) ====
Civil Division

- Ephinery Golam. For community services.
- The Honourable Bernard Narokobi, MP. For services to the law and politics.
- The Reverend Father Andrew Pong. For services to religion and the community.

==== Member of the Order of the British Empire (MBE) ====
Military Division

- Major Frank Gabriel Moi-He (86824), Papua New Guinea Defence Force.
- Captain Bruce Waluka (84047), Papua New Guinea Defence Force.

Civil Division

- Thomas Anis. For services to politics and development.
- Peter Kamb Bangiye. For services to the community and the Western Highlands Province.
- Dauloi Enau. For community services.
- Sergeant Himson Kaminiel. For services to the Papua New Guinea Correctional Services.
- Sister Marie Paul. For services to the Church, health, education and the community.
- Acting Justice Don Sawong. For services to the law.
- Miri Setae. For services to agriculture and primary industry.
- Rodney Suma. For community services.
- Duane Patrick Williams. For services to Scouting and the community.
- Naop Yaling. For public services and services to education.

=== Companion of the Imperial Service Order (ISO) ===
- Stephen Patrick Lapan. For services to education.

=== British Empire Medal (BEM) ===
Civil Division

- Billy Anabe. For services to the Government.
- Jack Bani. For services to the Department of Works and State.
- Kuk Endigua. For public and community service.
- Tara Jigem. For services to the Government.
- Daphne Penelope Karl. For services to the National Airline Industry.
- Kila Kedea. For services to Scouting and public and community service.
- Senior Constable Pirika Ipai Koivi. For services to the Royal Papua New Guinea Constabulary.
- Horatius Maiof. For public service.
- Jamba Samo. For services to the Department of Works.
- Maureen Stubberfield. For services to education.
- Yaeng Uss. For services to the Church and the community.

=== Queen's Police Medal (QPM) ===
- Chief Inspector Joel Kean. For services to the Royal Papua New Guinea Constabulary.

== Solomon Islands ==
=== Order of the British Empire ===
==== Knight Commander of the Order of the British Empire (KBE) ====
Civil Division

- David Nanau Kausimae, OBE. For services to politics, commerce and the community.

==== Officer of the Order of the British Empire (OBE) ====
Civil Division

- Captain Wilfred Israel Belo Fa'Ari. For services to the Marine Division of the Solomon Islands Government.

==== Member of the Order of the British Empire (MBE) ====
Civil Division

- Dick Boara. For services in the hospital and community nursing field.
- Sister Ethel Mary Taro. For services to nursing.

== Tuvalu ==
=== Order of the British Empire ===
==== Officer of the Order of the British Empire (OBE) ====
Civil Division

- The Honourable Faimalaga Luka. For public service.

==== Member of the Order of the British Empire (MBE) ====
Civil Division

- Dr. Ipuasi Kaisala. For services to the community, public health and medicine.
- Lafaele Kaitu. For services to the community, the public and the judiciary.

== Saint Vincent and the Grenadines ==
=== Order of Saint Michael and Saint George ===
==== Knight Commander of the Order of St Michael and St George (KCMG) ====
- The Right Honourable James Fitz-Allen Mitchell, MP. For distinguished public service.

== Belize ==
=== Order of the British Empire ===
==== Member of the Order of the British Empire (MBE) ====
Civil Division

- Velda Marguerite Aguet. For community service.
- Agripina Ann Espejo. For community service.
