= Crossroads Care =

Former charity in England and Wales which provided support for carers

Crossroads Care, also known as Crossroads, was a registered charity in England and Wales which provided support for carers. In 2012, it merged with The Princess Royal Trust for Carers to form Carers Trust.

The organisation was first established in 1974. It took its name from the TV soap opera Crossroads, in which the problems of families caring for disabled people at home were highlighted by an accident to one of the characters. The programme makers, Central Television, made a donation of £10,000 for a pilot scheme to be set up in Rugby, Warwickshire. Crossroads subsequently expanded to become a national organisation with over 250 local schemes throughout England and Wales, with a sister organisation in Scotland, Crossroads Caring Scotland.

Some local charities continue to use the name "Crossroads Care" or "Crossroads" together with a geographic location, such as Crossroads Care Slough and Oxfordshire Crossroads.
