= Malcolm Edge =

British mariner

Captain Sir Philip Malcolm Edge, KCVO (born 15 July 1931 in Bebington, UK), usually known by his middle name Malcolm, was Deputy Master and Chairman of the Board of Trinity House from 1988 to 1996.

The son of butcher Stanley Edge, he attended Rock Ferry High School until 1947, when he transferred to the naval training school HMS Conway (school ship), which at that time was moored in the Menai Strait. He then joined the BP Tanker Company as an apprentice deck officer. He rose to the position of senior master, commanding some of the largest tankers in the BP fleet.

He was elected an Elder Brother of Trinity House in 1978 and became Deputy Master (effectively CEO) in 1988. He was made a Freeman of the City of London in 1980; he also served as Master of the Company of Watermen and Lightermen for the 1996–97 year.

He was appointed a Knight Commander of the Royal Victorian Order in the 1995 New Year Honours.
