= Martin Bobrow =

British geneticist

Martin Bobrow CBE FRS FRCP FRCPath FMedSci
- Born: 6 February 1938 (age 88)
- Occupation: Geneticist
- Employer: Wolfson College, Cambridge

Martin Bobrow (born 1938) is a British geneticist, and Emeritus Fellow, Wolfson College, Cambridge.

Bobrow graduated in South Africa and then migrated to the United Kingdom.

He held chairs of medical genetics at the University of Amsterdam and at Guy's Hospital, and from 1995 to 2005 was professor of medical genetics at Cambridge University.

He has served on the council of the Medical Research Council; as a governor of the Wellcome Trust; as national chair of the Muscular Dystrophy Campaign; and chair of the Clinical Genetics Society; as chair of the Committee on Radiation in the Environment, chair of the Unrelated Living Transplant Regulating Authority; deputy chair of the Nuffield Council on Bioethics and as a member of the Human Genetics Advisory Commission.

He is a founding Fellow of the Academy of Medical Sciences, and a Non-executive Director of Cambridge University Hospitals.

He was elected a Fellow of the Royal Society (FRS) in 2004, a Fellow of the Royal College of Physicians (FRCP), a Fellow of the Royal College of Pathologists (FRCPath), and a Fellow of the Academy of Medical Sciences (FMedSci); and was made a Commander of the Order of the British Empire (CBE) in the 1995 New Year Honours, "For services to Science.".
