= Ronnie Lamont =

Irish rugby union player (1941–2022)

Ronald Arthur Lamont, MBE (18 November 1941 – 22 December 2022) was an Ireland international rugby union player.

Lamont was capped thirteen times for Ireland between 1965 and 1970, winning seven caps as a number eight and six as a flanker. He scored one try for Ireland. He was selected for the 1966 British Lions tour to Australia and New Zealand and played in all four internationals against New Zealand, scoring one try. He was selected by the 1967 New Zealand Rugby Almanac as one of its players of the season. Lamont also played club rugby for Instonians.

During his career, he received a lot of jerseys, most of which are framed in Ballyclare RFC. Lamont was a teacher at Throne Primary School, Whitewell Road, Newtownabbey, Northern Ireland between 1964 and 1970. He left and took up a post first as vice-principal and then, from 1977, as headmaster at Springhill Primary School in Belfast.

Lamont was appointed a Member of the Order of the British Empire (MBE) in the 1995 New Year Honours for services to education. He died on 22 December 2022 at the age of 81.
