= Patrick Brown (civil servant) =

British businessman and civil servant (born 1940)

Patrick Brown KCB
- Born: Austen Patrick Brown; April 1940 (age 85)
- Education: UCL School of Slavonic and East European Studies
- Occupations: Civil servant and businessman
- Known for: Permanent Secretary of the Department for Transport (1991–1997); Chairman of the Oil and Gas Authority (2015–2018)

Sir Austen Patrick Brown, KCB (born 14 April 1940), is a British retired civil servant and businessman.

== Life and career ==
Born in April 1940, Brown attended the School of Slavonic and East European Studies in London. He worked in the private sector, in Carreras Ltd from 1961 to 1969 and then as a management consultant with Urwick Orr and Partners from 1969 to 1972; in both roles, he worked extensively in Europe. In 1972, he entered HM Civil Service, becoming a Deputy Secretary in the Department of the Environment (DoE) in 1988. He was then Second Permanent Secretary in the DoE and Chief Executive of the Property Services Agency from 1990 to 1991 and then Permanent Secretary of the Department of Transport from 1991 to 1997. He subsequently held various directorships in the private sector and was chairman of the Go-Ahead Group Plc from 2002 to 2013. He also served as chairman of the Oil and Gas Authority from 2015 to 2018. Brown was appointed a Knight Commander of the Order of the Bath (KCB) in the 1995 New Year honours.
