= Christopher Paine =

British radiologist and oncologist

Sir Christopher Paine FRCP FRCR FRSM

Consultant in Radiotherapy and Oncology, Churchill Hospital
- In office 1970–1995

Personal details
- Born: Christopher Hammon Paine; 28 August 1935 (age 91)
- Occupation: Radiologist, oncologist

Sir Christopher Hammon Paine (born 28 August 1935) is a British radiologist and oncologist.

Paine, the grandson of Samuel Vestey, 2nd Baron Vestey, was educated at Eton and Merton College, Oxford.

He was President of the Royal Society of Medicine (1996–1998) and of the British Medical Association (2000–2001). He was made a Knight Bachelor in the 1995 New Year Honours, "for services to medicine".
