= Crawford Beveridge =

Scottish-American technology executive

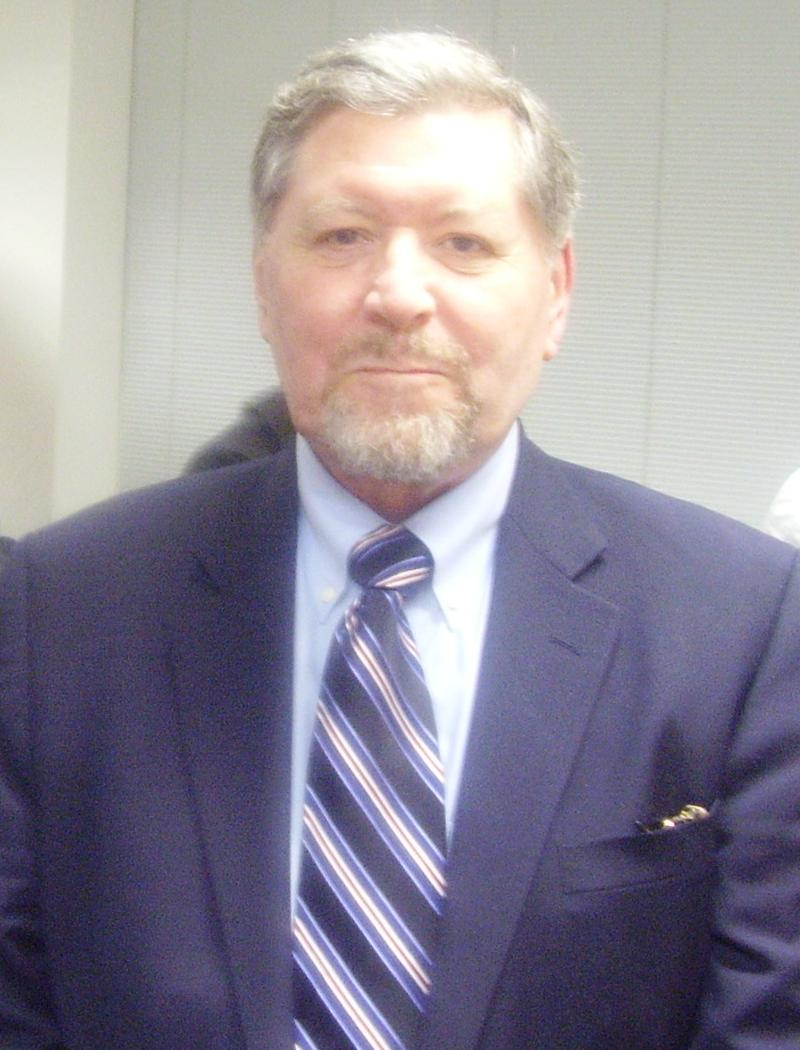
- Beveridge in São Paulo, Brazil, in 2008
- Born: Crawford W. Beveridge; Scotland
- Education: B.Sc. in Social Science, University of Edinburgh; M.Sc. in Industrial Administration, University of Bradford
- Occupation: Technology executive
- Employers: Sun Microsystems; Scottish Enterprise; Autodesk
- Title: Chair, Council of Economic Advisers (Scotland)
- Board member of: Autodesk (Non-Executive Chairman); Memec; Scottish Equity Partners
- Honours: Commander of the Order of the British Empire (CBE) (1995); Fellow of the Royal Society of Edinburgh (FRSE) (2016)

Crawford W. Beveridge CBE is a Scottish-American technology executive.

Beveridge, originally from Scotland, attended the University of Edinburgh, earning a B.Sc. in social science. He followed that with an M.Sc. in industrial administration from the University of Bradford.

He was given the honour of a Commander of the Order of the British Empire in 1995 and was elected a Fellow of the Royal Society of Edinburgh in 2016.

Beveridge's business background included Hewlett-Packard, Digital Equipment Corp., and Analog Devices. In 1985, he joined Sun Microsystems as vice president of corporate resources, where he stayed until 1991, when he left and took the position of chief executive of Scottish Enterprise.

In 2000, he returned to Sun to fill the position of executive vice president of people and places and chief human resources officer. He was a board member of corporations outside of Sun, including Autodesk, Memec, and Scottish Equity Partners. He is a non-executive chairman of the board in Autodesk and as of July 2016, Beveridge owns approximately $1.9 million worth of Autodesk shares.

He was executive vice president and chairman, EMEA, APAC, and the Americas of Sun in 2007.

He chairs the Scottish government's Council of Economic Advisers.
