= Marjorie Bean =

Bermudian politician, and philanthropist

Dame Marjorie Bean DBE
- Born: 25 May 1909
- Died: 16 March 2001 (aged 91)
- Education: Wilberforce University, Columbia University, Teacher's College
- Known for: Legislative Council

Dame Marjorie Louise Bean DBE (25 May 1909 – 16 March 2001) was the first Bermudian woman to be appointed to Bermuda's former Legislative Council. She was a trustee and founding member of the Bermuda Public Services Union (BPSU).

== Life ==
She attended Wilberforce University (in Ohio), Columbia University's Teachers College (in New York City), and the Institute of Education at the University of London.

She began her career in education teaching English and geography at the Berkeley Institute, Pembroke Parish, Bermuda. In 1948, she became the first black person to be appointed to an administrative position in Bermuda's Department of Education when she took on the job of Supervisor of Schools/Education Officer (1949-1974). In 1979, she received the Stellar Halsall Memorial Award for Community Activities and Arts.

== Awards ==
Bean was made a Member of the Order of the British Empire (MBE) "in recognition of the significant contribution she made to education in Bermuda" in 1968. She was later advanced to Officer (OBE) in 1981, and, lastly, to Dame (DBE) in 1995. In 1977, she was awarded the Queen's Silver Jubilee Medal.

== Death ==
She died, aged 91, on 16 March 2001.

== Legacy ==
- Dame Marjorie Bean Hope Academy, 10 Old Military Road, Devonshire Parish, Bermuda, DV-02.
