= Crossroads Caring Scotland =

Crossroads Caring Scotland is a national charity which exists to support carers in Scotland, through the provision of respite care and other forms of practical support. The organisation was established in 1978 and began providing services during the following year.

Care staff provide relief for the carer by taking over caring responsibilities for short periods, allowing the carer to have a break from their caring role. There are 47 Crossroads services throughout Scotland, supported by the national office based in George Square, Glasgow.

== History ==
Crossroads owes its existence to the tea-time soap opera of the same name. A story line involving one of the programme's main characters, Sandy Richardson, saw the son of the hotel boss become paraplegic as a result of a road accident. During their research, producers consulted with local people with disabilities and found that there was little or no support for their carers - many of whom seldom received any form of break from their role. The programme makers provided a grant to establish the first ever service, in Rugby in 1974, from which a large network of similar projects grew to provide cover for much of England and Wales.

The idea of a Scottish sister organisation was first mooted in 1978 and was taken forward by Jimmy Whittle, a retired accountant and one-time professional footballer with Hearts.

Crossroads Caring Scotland has no formal ties with Crossroads England and Wales.

== National context ==
The national organisation exists to promote, develop and enhance the services provided by a network of local services covering all but 5 Scottish local authorities. The organisation works alongside the Scottish Government and other national caring organisations. It has been involved in a series of government sponsored committees, has contributed to guidance to local authorities on carer services and was involved in the Carers Legislation Working Group which led to carers becoming identified in Scottish law as 'Key Partners in Care'.

Carers are viewed by the government as an important resource and in recent years have been given increasing recognition in health and social care policy. Since devolution in 1999 legislation and policy for caregivers has been developed by the former Scottish Executive (now Scottish Government).

Carers in Scotland are regarded as ‘partners’ in the provision of care. As a result, support services provided to carers are regarded as part of the overall package of care to the person being looked after. This means that carers are not seen as service users and are therefore not responsible for the cost of any service provided. The exception to this is when a carer is looking after their partner; in that situation their income may be taken into account during a financial assessment.

This situation is different from that which exists in England where carers are viewed as services users in their own right and as such are liable for the cost of services provided. Yet, in many cases, it is not the carer who actually needs the service; it is the person being cared for who needs it because of their illness or disability.

== Controversy ==
In 2017 the charity was named by the UK Department for Business, Energy & Industrial Strategy as one of a number which had failed to pay its staff the national minimum wage.
