= JLS discography =

Band discography

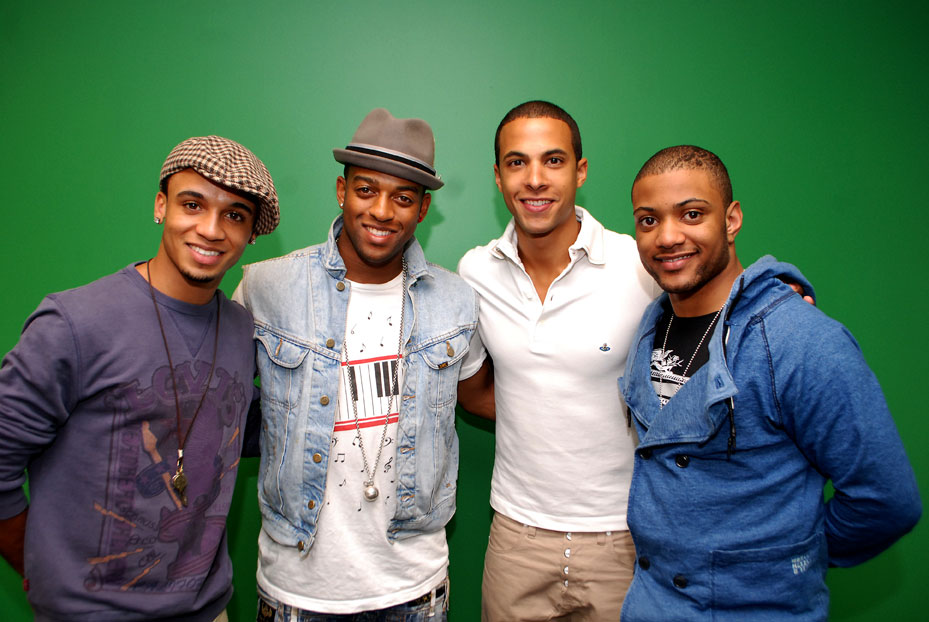
- JLS in Chicago, April 2010
- Studio albums: 5
- Compilation albums: 1
- Singles: 16
- Music videos: 12

The discography of English boy band JLS, consisting of members Aston Merrygold, Oritsé Williams, Marvin Humes, and JB Gill, comprises five studio albums, one greatest hits album and sixteen singles. According to the British Phonographic Industry (BPI), JLS has sold 2.6 million albums and 3.6 million singles in the United Kingdom.

After their appearance on The X Factor, JLS were signed to Epic Records. The band's debut single, "Beat Again", was released in July and reached number one on the UK Singles Chart. In November 2009, JLS released their eponymously titled debut album, JLS. It debuted at number one on the UK Album Chart, selling over 1 million copies domestically and becoming the sixth best-selling album in the UK during 2009. The album's second single "Everybody in Love" also topped the UK Singles Chart, while third and final single "One Shot" peaked at number six.

"The Club Is Alive", was released in July 2010 as the lead single from JLS' second studio album Outta This World. The song debuted at number one, becoming the group's third UK number-one single. It was followed by their BBC Children in Need single "Love You More", which became their fourth UK number-one. Outta This World was released in November 2010 and debuted at number two on the UK Albums Chart, selling 152,000 copies, being held off the number one spot by the second week sales of Take That's record breaking Progress album. The album's third single "Eyes Wide Shut" was remixed to feature Tinie Tempah, and reached number eight on the UK Singles Chart.

In July 2011, JLS released "She Makes Me Wanna" featuring American singer-songwriter Dev, the lead single from their third album Jukebox. The song debuted at number one, becoming the group's fifth UK number one single, while "Take a Chance on Me", the second single to precede the album, charted at number two. Jukebox was released on 14 November 2011 and debuted and peaked at number two on the UK Albums Chart. "Do You Feel What I Feel?", the album's third and final single, peaked at number 16 on the UK Singles Chart, becoming JLS' first single to miss the top ten. Evolution, the band's fourth studio album, was released in November 2012. It peaked at number 3 on the UK ALbums Chart and produced two singles, including top ten hit "Hottest Girl in the World".

In April 2013, JLS announced that they would be splitting up after releasing their greatest hits collection Goodbye – The Greatest Hits. Their final single "Billion Lights", was released in 10 November 2013, and peaked at number 19 on the UK Singles Chart.

In 2020, JLS signed with BMG Rights Management and began producing their comeback album 2.0. Released in December 2021, it peaked at number four on the UK Albums Chart, becoming their sixth consecutive top ten album in the United Kingdom. Three singles were released from the album, including "Eternal Love", "Day One" and "Postcard", with the latter two released as promotional singles only.

== Albums ==
=== Studio albums ===
Title	Album details	Peak chart positions				Certifications	Sales
Title	Album details	UK	UK R&B	IRE	SCO	Certifications	Sales
JLS	Released: 9 November 2009; Label: Epic; Formats: CD, digital download	1	1	1	1	UK: 5× Platinum; IRE: 2× Platinum	UK: 1,500,000; IRE: 30,000
Outta This World	Released: 22 November 2010; Label: Epic; Formats: CD, digital download	2	1	4	2	UK: 2× Platinum; IRE: Platinum	UK: 600,000; IRE: 15,000
Jukebox	Released: 14 November 2011; Label: Epic; Formats: CD, digital download	2	1	5	2	UK: Platinum; IRE: Gold	UK: 300,000; IRE: 7500
Evolution	Released: 5 November 2012; Label: RCA; Formats: CD, digital download	3	1	7	5	UK: Gold	UK: 100,000
2.0	Released: 3 December 2021; Label: BMG; Formats: CD, download, LP, cassette	4	—	35	3		
"—" denotes album that did not chart or was not released.

=== Compilation albums ===
Title	Album details	Peak chart positions			Certifications	Sales
Title	Album details	UK	IRE	SCO	Certifications	Sales
Goodbye – The Greatest Hits	Released: 18 November 2013; Label: RCA; Formats: CD, digital download	6	22	8	UK: Gold	UK: 100,000

== Singles ==
=== As lead artist ===
Single	Year	Peak chart positions				Certifications	Album
Single	Year	UK	UK R&B	IRE	SCO	Certifications	Album
"Beat Again"	2009	1	—	3	1	UK: Platinum	JLS
"Everybody in Love"	2009	1	1	2	1	UK: Platinum	JLS
"One Shot"	2010	6	—	11	7	UK: Platinum	JLS
"The Club Is Alive"	2010	1	1	4	1	UK: Gold	Outta This World
"Love You More"	2010	1	—	12	1	UK: Silver	Outta This World
"Eyes Wide Shut" (featuring Tinie Tempah)	2011	8	3	14	9	UK: Gold	Outta This World
"She Makes Me Wanna" (featuring Dev)	2011	1	1	2	1	UK: Platinum	Jukebox
"Take a Chance on Me"	2011	2	1	13	2	UK: Silver	Jukebox
"Do You Feel What I Feel?"	2012	16	6	29	15		Jukebox
"Proud"	2012	6	—	28	6		Goodbye – The Greatest Hits
"Hottest Girl in the World"	2012	6	3	22	9		Evolution
"Hold Me Down / Give Me Life"	2012	112	13	—	—		Evolution
"Billion Lights"	2013	19	—	31	15		Goodbye – The Greatest Hits
"Eternal Love"	2021	71	—	—	—		2.0
"Day One"	2021	― (Note: "Day One" did not enter the UK Singles Chart, but peaked at number 70 on the UK Singles Downloads Chart.)	―	―	―		2.0
"Postcard"	2021	― (Note: "Postcard" did not enter the UK Singles Chart, but peaked at number 56 on the UK Singles Downloads Chart.)	―	―	―		2.0
"—" denotes single that did not chart or was not released.

=== As featured artists ===
Single	Year	Peak chart positions			Certifications	Album
Single	Year	UK	IRE	SCO	Certifications	Album
"Hero" (as part of The X Factor Finalists)	2008	1	1	1	UK: 2× Platinum	Non-album singles
"Everybody Hurts" (as part of Helping Haiti)	2010	1	1	1	UK: Platinum	Non-album singles
"What About Love" (featuring Lemar)	2010	160				The Hits
"Wishing on a Star" (The X Factor Finalists 2011 featuring JLS and One Direction)	2011	1	1	1		Non-album single
"—" denotes single that did not chart or was not released.
