= Goodbye – The Greatest Hits =

Goodbye the Greatest Hits

Greatest hits album by JLS
- Released: 18 November 2013
- Label: RCA
- Producers: Steve Mac; J.R. Rotem; David D.A. Doman; Wayne Hector; Soulshock & Karlin; Toby Gad; Syience; DEEKAY; BeatGeek; Jimmy Joker; Teddy Sky; Nasri Atweh; Emile Ghantous; Julian Bunetta; Cutfather; Jason Gill; Daniel Davidsen; Ali Tennant; Mr. Bangladesh; Dem Jointz; James Reynolds; MNEK; Sandy Vee; Camille Purcell; Dan Lancaster

JLS chronology
Evolution (2012)	Goodbye the Greatest Hits (2013)	2.0 (2021)

Singles from Goodbye – The Greatest Hits
- 1. "Billion Lights" Released: 17 November 2013

Goodbye – The Greatest Hits is the first greatest hits album, and fifth album overall, to be released by British boy band JLS. It was released in the United Kingdom on 18 November 2013, via RCA Records. The album contained a total of twelve tracks, including all of the band's singles, plus a new single "Billion Lights", which was released ten days prior to the album on 8 November 2013. The deluxe edition of the album featured a bonus DVD with all of the band's music videos. The super deluxe edition contained a disc of all of the band's B-sides, as well as remixes. This version was made available through the band's official webstore. The album resulted in "The Greatest Hits" tour which took place in December 2013.

== Background and promotion ==
On 15 December 2012, Marvin Humes revealed that JLS were to release their fifth album in 2013. "By the time 2013 rolls round it'll be time for our fifth album," he said. "This is usually a greatest hits in boy band territory but we don't know if we're ready for that yet. There will definitely be an album next year. There's a lot of competition for us – not just from other boy bands. So we have to stay ahead of the game and stay relevant coming up with new hits.". On 1 February 2013, it was confirmed that work on the album had begun. On 26 March 2013, Humes confirmed that the band were heading out to Los Angeles to record the album: "We're booked in to go to LA and work with Rodney Jerkins again and are looking at some new people too."

On 23 April 2013, JLS shocked fans by announcing that they would be splitting after six years together. In a statement on their official website, the band said that they would be releasing a greatest hits album and embark their third and final arena tour.

To each and every JLSter, our beloved fans around the world. We wanted to make sure that you heard it from the four of us, that we have decided to bring our time as a band to an end. It has been the most incredible journey over the last 6 years and we have achieved more things than we could have ever dreamed possible. Thanks to all of you guys, your support, your dedication and your love, you have changed our lives forever and we wouldn't be where we are today without you.

We are currently in the studio working on what will be our last album - Goodbye: The Greatest Hits. We will be bringing you a new single later in the year to coincide with the album and the tour. Goodbye: The Greatest Hits Tour will be the last time that we will perform together as a 4 and we want to make sure that this tour is the best ever and that we end on a high! We will always remain brothers and friends and we will always be your boys.

We will continue to work on the JLS Foundation after our split, as we want to raise as much money and awareness as possible for great causes and our partner Cancer Research UK. We also want to continue the legacy that we started 3 years ago with the Foundation and we hope that you always continue to support that. To find out more please go to www.jlsfoundation.co.uk

As always we will continue to support each other and we hope you will enjoy watching us grow individually in our new chapters going forward.We want to look at this final year as a celebration of all that we have achieved together. We hope you can look back and remember all the great moments that you have been responsible for.

All that's left to say is the biggest THANK YOU for following us from day 1 and every day since then. You are truly the best fans in the world and we will always love you.

OJAM x

In an exclusive interview with the Official Charts Company, Aston Merrygold said of the album: "It features a load of hits from day one! 'Beat Again' and 'Everybody in Love', to 'Eyes Wide Shut', to 'Take a Chance on Me'... the list goes on! Well, obviously not 'on', there's about twelve!"

JLS performed "Billion Lights" live on Strictly Come Dancing on 17 November 2013.

== Singles ==
On 26 September, JLS's management tweeted that the band's last ever single would be called "Billion Lights" and also revealed the artwork. The song reached number 19 in the UK, the band's second-lowest charting single.

== Track listing ==
Standard edition
No.	Title	Writer(s)	Producer(s)	Length
1.	"Beat Again" (from JLS)	Wayne Hector; Steve Mac	Mac	3:19
2.	"Everybody In Love" (from JLS)	Hector; Jonathan Rotem; David D.A. Doman	J.R. Rotem; Doman; Hector	3:16
3.	"One Shot" (from JLS)	Carsten Schack; Kenneth Karlin; Michael Warren; Brandon White; Sean Hurley	Soulshock & Karlin	3:48
4.	"The Club Is Alive" (from Outta This World)	Richard Rodgers; Oscar Hammerstein II; Savan Kotecha; Andrew Frampton; Mac	Mac	3:43
5.	"Love You More" (from Outta This World)	Oritsé Williams; Marvin Humes; Jonathan Gill; Aston Merrygold; Hector; Toby Gad	Gad; Syience; Hector	3:47
6.	"Eyes Wide Shut" (featuring Tinie Tempah (from Outta This World)	Williams; Humes; Jonathan Gill; Merrygold; Tim McEwan; Lars Halvor Jensen; Patrick Okogwu	DEEKAY	3:51
7.	"She Makes Me Wanna" (featuring Dev) (from Jukebox)	Williams; Humes; Jonathan Gill; Merrygold; BeatGeek; Jimmy Joker; Teddy Sky	BeatGeek; Jimmy Joker; Teddy Sky	3:39
8.	"Take a Chance on Me" (from Jukebox)	Nasri Atweh; Frankie Bautista; Emile Ghantous; Nick Turpin	Atweh; Ghantous	3:35
9.	"Do You Feel What I Feel?" (from Jukebox)	Gloria Shayne Baker; Noël Regney; Tebey; Julian Bunetta; John Ryan	Bunetta	3:13
10.	"Proud" (single release only)	Williams; Humes; Jonathan Gill; Merrygold; Ali Tennant; Mich Hansen; Jason Gill; Daniel Davidsen	Cutfather; Jason Gill; Davidsen; Tennant	4:02
11.	"Hottest Girl in the World" (from Evolution)	Williams; Humes; Jonathan Gill; Merrygold; Shondrae Crawford; Dwayne Abernathy; Tennant	Mr. Bangladesh; Dem Jointz; James Reynolds; MNEK	3:37
12.	"Billion Lights" (previously unreleased)	Tennant; Camille Purcell; Dan Lancaster; David Mespoulet; Sandy Vee	Vee; Purcell; Lancaster	3:32

Super deluxe edition bonus disc
No.	Title	Writer(s)	Producer(s)	Length
1.	"Umbrella" (B-side from "Beat Again")	Shawn Carter; Thaddis Harrell; Terius "The-Dream" Nash; Christopher Stewart	Cutfather; Jonas Jeberg; Tennant	4:21
2.	"Spell it Out" (B-side from "Everybody in Love")	Williams; Humes; Jonathan Gill; Merrygold; Matt Rowe; Stacey James	Rowe	3:54
3.	"Mary" (B-side from One Shot)	Williams; Humes; Jonathan Gill; Merrygold; Ryan Munroe; Omar Adimora; Carl Morgan	Munroe; Adimora; Jonathan Shakovskoy	3:05
4.	"Only Tonight" (featuring Chipmunk) (B-side from "The Club Is Alive")	Williams; Humes; Jonathan Gill; Merrygold; Jensen; Larsson; Tennant	DEEKAY	3:54
5.	"You Got My Love" (B-side from "Love You More")	Williams; Humes; Jonathan Gill; Merrygold; Paul Meehan; Tim Woodcock	Brian Rawling; Meehan	3:38
6.	"Broken Strings" (B-side from "Eyes Wide Shut")	James Morrison; Fraser Smith; Nina Woodford	Steve Robson	4:14
7.	"Nobody Knows" (B-side from "She Makes Me Wanna")	Joe Rich; Don DuBose	Mac	3:21
8.	"Unstoppable" (B-side from "Take a Chance on Me")	Williams; Humes; Jonathan Gill; Merrygold; Jensen; Larsson; Talay Riley	DEEKAY	4:21
9.	"Pieces of My Heart" (B-side from "Do You Feel What I Feel?")	Williams; Humes; Jonathan Gill; Merrygold; Paul Barry; Alex Smith	Smith; Matt Furmidge	3:54

Deluxe edition bonus DVD
No.	Title	Length
1.	"Beat Again"	3:19
2.	"Everybody In Love"	3:16
3.	"One Shot"	3:48
4.	"The Club Is Alive"	3:43
5.	"Love You More"	3:47
6.	"Eyes Wide Shut" (featuring Tinie Tempah)	3:51
7.	"She Makes Me Wanna" (featuring Dev)	3:39
8.	"Take a Chance on Me"	3:35
9.	"Do You Feel What I Feel?"	3:13
10.	"Proud"	4:02
11.	"Hottest Girl in the World"	3:37

== Charts ==
=== Weekly charts ===
Weekly chart performance for Goodbye – The Greatest Hits
Chart (2013)	Peak position
Irish Albums (IRMA)	22
Scottish Albums (Official Charts)	8
UK Albums (Official Charts)	6

=== Year-end charts ===
Year-end chart performance for Goodbye – The Greatest Hits
Chart (2013)	Position
UK Albums (OCC)	109

== Certifications ==
Certifications for Goodbye – The Greatest Hits
Region	Certification	Certified units/sales
United Kingdom (BPI)	Gold	100,000^{*}
^{*} Sales figures based on certification alone.

== Release history ==
Goodbye – The Greatest Hits release history
Region	Date	Format	Label	Ref.
Australia	15 November 2013	Standard; deluxe	RCA	
Ireland	15 November 2013	Standard; deluxe	RCA	
United Kingdom	18 November 2013	Standard; deluxe; super deluxe	RCA	
