= 2.0 (JLS album) =

Studio album by JLS
- Released: 3 December 2021
- Genres: Pop; R&B
- Length: 42:40
- Label: BMG
- Producers: Bobbybass; Chris Braide; Dom Decoy; Deekay; Jerry Duplessis; Toby Gad; J-Remy; Lost Boy; Steve Mac; Metrophonic; Lucas Secon; Stargate

JLS chronology
Goodbye – The Greatest Hits (2013)	2.0 (2021)

Singles from 2.0
- 1. "Eternal Love"; 2. "Day One"; 3. "Postcard"

2.0 is the fifth studio album by British boy band JLS. It was released on 3 December 2021 through BMG Rights Management. The band's first project in nearly a decade, it marked their first studio album since 2012's Evolution. JLS largely reteamed with previous collaborators such as producers Deekay, Toby Gad, Steve Mac, Stargate, and Jerry Duplessis to work on material for the album, while expanding their lineupto include Dom Decoy and Lost Boy. Ed Sheeran co-wrote the lead single "Eternal Love", which helped shaping the album's musical direction and served as the first new material recorded for the project.

Upon release, critics found 2.0 an enjoyable but familiar return to form and praised the album for its easy-listening appeal and maintaining the group’s earlier quality. Commercially, 2.0 debuted at number four on the UK Albums Chart, becoming JLS' sixth consecutive top-ten entry, while also reaching number 35 in Ireland. Three singles were released from the album, including "Eternal Love", "Day One" and "Postcard", with the latter two released as promotional singles only.

== Background ==
By the early 2010s, JLS had established themselves as one of the United Kingdom's leading boy bands, having released a string of albums and embarked on large-scale tours. Despite their success and initial plans for a fifth studio album after 2012's Evolution, in April 2013 the group announced they would be disbanding after six years together. In their statement, they confirmed plans to release a farewell compilation album,Goodbye – The Greatest Hits, and to undertake a final arena tour later that year. Their final single as a group, "Billion Lights", was released in November 2013. JLS officially disbanded following the final gig of their Goodbye Tour at The O2 Arena in London on 22 December 2013.

In November 2019, it was reported that JLS would return as a band after six years, with plans to launch a tour and release new music. This was confirmed on 12 February 2020, when JLS announced their reformation for a reunion tour called the Beat Again Tour. In March, it was revealed that JLS had signed a new record deal with BMG to release new music, but due to the COVID-19 pandemic, new music was put on hold. Recording for their next album 2.0 took place throughout 2020 and 2021, with sessions adapted to COVID-19 safety restrictions. As a result, much of the early songwriting and pre-production was conducted remotely, with the group collaborating via digital file-sharing and virtual writing sessions before later reuniting in the studio.

== Critical reception ==
Professional ratings
Review scores
Source	Rating
The i Paper	3/5 stars

Kate Solomon from The i Paper rated the album three out of five stars. She found that 2.0 "sounds like a lot of existing things and it is lyrically questionable, but as an album it is enjoyable enough for me to leave it playing twice without really noticing. Is that praise? Not really, but I don't mind JLS 2.0: a reliable octet of hands to hold on to vintage pop/R&B for a couple of minutes while newer artists push it forward." Medium critic Q. Cummins felt the album was "picking up right" where previous album Evolution "left off", writing: "Despite this nostalgia-based juxtaposition, the album definitely meets the same standard and quality as those before it, making it undeniably JLS through and through. It's undoubtedly impressive how despite a seven-year hiatus between albums, JLS have managed to maintain the same quality and standard as though they hadn't missed a day."

== Commercial performance ==
Initially predicted to debut at number two on the UK Albums Chart, 2.0 opened at number four in the week of 10 December 2021. It marked JLS' sixth UK top ten album, continuing an unbroken streak since their self-titled debut in 2009. 2.0 also reached number three on the Scottish Albums Chart and number 35 on the Irish Albums Chart.

== Track listing ==
2.0. track listing
No.	Title	Writer(s)	Producer(s)	Length
1.	"Eternal Love"	Steve Mac; Ed Sheeran	Mac	3:18
2.	"Postcard"	Aston Merrygold; Marvin Humes; Oritsé Williams; JB Gill; Peter Rycroft; James Abrahart; Tom Mann	Lost Boy	3:09
3.	"Priceless"	Merrygold; Humes; Williams; Gill; Danny Shah; Dominic Lyttle	Dom Decoy	2:53
4.	"Changed"	Merrygold; Humes; Williams; Gill; Jay Sean; Jared Cotter; Robert Larow; Jeremy Skaller; Jonathan Perkins	J-Remy; BobbyBass	3:28
5.	"Audition"	Merrygold; Humes; Williams; Gill; Rigo; Mikkel S. Eriksen; Tor E. Hermansen; Nick Brongers	Stargate	3:00
6.	"Love Immortal"	Merrygold; Humes; Williams; Gill; Rigo; Jerry "Wonda" Duplessis; Arden Altino	Duplessis	2:50
7.	"Looking at Me"	Merrygold; Humes; Williams; Gill; Wayne Hector; Toby Gad	Gad	3:20
8.	"Nothing Without U"	Merrygold; Humes; Williams; Gill; Paul Barry; Alex Smith	Metrophonic	2:32
9.	"Feel Your Love"	Merrygold; Humes; Williams; Gill; Daniel "Obi" Klein; Ali Tennant; Johannes R. Jørgensen	Deekay	2:49
10.	"Day One"	Merrygold; Humes; Williams; Gill; McEwan; Jensen; Tennant	Deekay	3:00
11.	"Glow"	Merrygold; Humes; Williams; Gill; Rigo; Eriksen; Hermansen	Stargate	3:34

Deluxe edition
No.	Title	Writer(s)	Producer(s)	Length
12.	"Tango"	Merrygold; Humes; Williams; Gill; Tennant; Lucas Secon; Carsten Mortensen	Secon	3:17
13.	"DNA"	Merrygold; Humes; Williams; Gill; Chris Braide	Braide	3:42
14.	"Eternal Love" (Luca Schreiner remix)	Mac; Ed Sheeran	Mac; Luca Schreiner^{[a]}	3:08
Total length:				42:40

Notes

- ^{^[a]} signifies additional producer(s)

== Charts ==
Weekly chart performance for 2.0
Chart (2021)	Peak position
Irish Albums (Official Charts)	35
Scottish Albums (Official Charts)	3
UK Albums (Official Charts)	4
