= Marvin Humes =

English singer, DJ and presenter (born 1985)

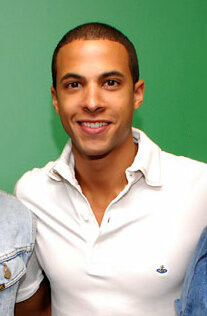
- Humes with JLS in 2010
- Born: Marvin Richard James Humes; 18 March 1985 (age 41); Greenwich, London, England
- Occupations: Singer; actor; DJ; television presenter
- Years active: 1999–present
- Employers: Bauer; ITV; BBC
- Agent: Modest Management
- Known for: JLS (2006–2013, 2019–present)
- Television: Holby City (2000–2003); This Morning (2013–2015); The Voice UK (2014–2016); The Hit List (2019–present)
- Spouse: Rochelle Wiseman (m. 2012)
- Children: 3
- Musical career
- Genres: Pop; R&B; dance
- Instrument: Vocals
- Years active: 2004–present
- Labels: Epic; RCA; Polydor
- Website: www.marvinhumes.com

Marvin Richard James Humes (born 18 March 1985) is an English singer-songwriter, disc jockey, radio host, television presenter, and former actor. Before rising to prominence as a member of the British boy band JLS, he had an acting role in Holby City. As part of JLS, he achieved five number-one singles on the UK Singles Charts and a number-one album on the UK Albums Charts. As of December 2013, they had sold over 10 million records worldwide.

Humes has since ventured into radio and television presenting. He currently presents a weekday mid morning show on Kiss and an afternoon show on Kisstory. He previously presented the Monday–Thursday late-night show across the Capital Network. He previously hosted The Official Big Top 40 charts across UK commercial radio stations on a Sunday afternoon, between 2013 and 2018. Between 2014 and 2016, Humes hosted BBC One's The Voice UK with Emma Willis and created a DJ-Producer-dance act LuvBug. Since 2019, he has co-hosted the game show The Hit List with his wife Rochelle Humes.

== Early life ==
Marvin Richard James Humes was born on 18 March 1985 in Greenwich, London. He is the son of a Jamaican father and Scottish mother and is the middle child between two brothers.

Humes started his music career in a band called VS which was created by Blue member Simon Webbe; however shortly after being formed and releasing an album, they split. Humes appeared in Holby City on the BBC for three years from 2000 to 2003, playing Robbie Waring for 14 episodes. At the age of 14, he starred in a children's programme called K-Club, which helped people with computers and how they work.

== Career ==
=== Beginnings and The X Factor ===
Humes' future bandmate Oritsé Williams decided to form his own boy band after not feeling the ones he had been scouted for were right for him. Through friends, Williams met Marvin Humes who had experience in R&B and pop music, being a part of VS in 2004. Next to join was Aston Merrygold, who was once cast in the ITV children's programme Fun Song Factory, because of his athletic ability. Last to join the group was JB Gill, chosen for his "musical ear" and harmonies. The boys bonded, became friends and together they were called UFO (an initialism of Unique Famous Outrageous). They signed to Tracklacers developing a sound they then called "Jack the Lad Swing", combining the phrase "Jack the lad" and the urban music of new jack swing. UFO then signed to Epic Records. The band won their first award in late 2007 at the Urban Music Awards for Best Unsigned Act thanks to their mash-up of "Stand by Me" by Ben E. King and "Beautiful Girls" by Sean Kingston. Shortly thereafter, they released their second single, "Slap Ya Elbow". The group give credit to "DJ Triz" who produced one of UFO's first songs and helped them write it.

In 2008, UFO auditioned for the fifth series of The X Factor, but had to change their name because it was already being used by another group. They decided to go with the name JLS (an initialism of Jack the Lad Swing, the style created with Tracklacers some months prior). Following the elimination of girl groups Bad Lashes and Girlband in weeks one and two respectively, JLS were Louis Walsh's last remaining act in the competition, but, throughout the live shows, the judges called them the best band to come out of The X Factor. In week 7, JLS were in the bottom two along with Rachel Hylton. However, they survived, thanks to votes from Walsh, Cheryl Cole and Simon Cowell. Cowell stated when casting his deciding vote that JLS did not deserve to be in the bottom two. In week 8, JLS performed "...Baby One More Time" and received negative comments from two of the four judges, with Cowell saying "At the moment you're out." However, after their second performance, "You Light Up My Life", Cowell commented that they were "back in the race" and that they could "have a hit record" with that performance.

In week 9, JLS performed "Umbrella" and "I'm Already There". Cowell then predicted they would win the competition. They made it to the final and performed their own version of the winner's song, "Hallelujah", which the other finalist, and eventual winner, Alexandra Burke also performed. JLS were the fourth band to make the final of the competition. Following their success on The X Factor, Cowell's record company, Syco, were going to sign JLS; however, Cowell revoked this offer, deciding instead to focus solely on winner Burke. JLS's manager thought the band would be well suited to Epic Records, with whom they signed a record contract in January 2009.

=== 2006–2013: JLS ===
Following their appearance on The X Factor, JLS signed to Epic Records. Their first two singles "Beat Again" and "Everybody in Love" both went to number one on the UK Singles Chart. The band's self-titled debut album was released on 9 November 2009, and has since sold over one million copies in the UK. JLS won the awards for British Breakthrough and British Single ("Beat Again") at the 2010 BRIT Awards. They also won several awards at the Mobo Awards for Best song for "Beat Again" in 2009 and also Best Newcomer in the same year. In 2010, they won the MOBO Awards for Best UK act and Best Album. They also went on to win their fifth MOBO Award in 2012 by winning Best Video for "Do You Feel What I Feel?". They won the title of the UK's hardest-working band for two constitutive years, in 2011 and 2012.

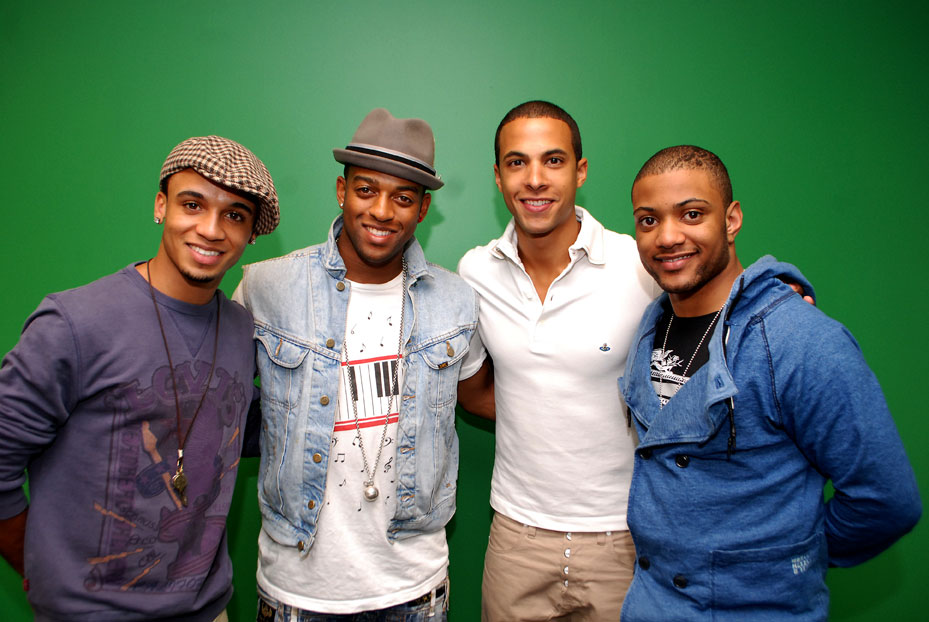
JLS Performs at KISS FM 103.5 Chicago Radio on 20 April 2010.

In 2010, JLS signed a record deal in the United States with Jive Records, and released "Everybody in Love" as their debut US single, but it failed to chart. "The Club Is Alive", the lead single from their second studio album, was released in the UK in July 2010, and earned the band their third number-one on the UK Singles Chart. Their single "Love You More", the official single for Children in Need in 2010, was the group's fourth UK number one. Their single "She Makes Me Wanna" featuring Dev was their fifth UK number one. As of 2012, their debut album and single has been named one of The X Factor's top ten biggest-selling debut singles and albums. JLS have sold more than 10 million records worldwide. As of 2013, they are the sixteenth richest reality TV stars in the UK, with an estimated fortune of £6 million per member, totalling £24 million.

In December 2012, Humes signed with an acting agent, hoping that landing a part in a credible show would give him the platform to launch a career in acting after JLS came to an end. On 24 April 2013, it was announced that the band were to split after their fifth album and tour. They released their last book as a band, called Forever and a Day, One Last Goodbye X, on 24 October 2013. JLS' last ever performance was on 22 December 2013 on the last night of their "Goodbye - The Greatest Hits Tour".

=== LuvBug ===
On 23 July 2014, Humes announced through social networking sites that he had formed a new dance group featuring 'The White N3RD & JKAY called LuvBug. They were officially signed to Polydor Records and their first single, "Resonance" featuring Talay Riley, was released on 5 October 2014. It charted at number 13 on the week of 18 October 2014. The follow-up single, "Revive (Say Something)" was number 17 in the UK charts in February 2015.

LuvBug first aired their new single "Best is Yet to Come" on 5 February 2016 and it was released in April 2016.

=== Radio ===
In March 2013, Humes began hosting his own radio show, #FridayNightCapital on Capital on Friday evenings between 7pm and 10pm as the official start of "The Weekend Lives on Capital".

On 5 January 2014, Humes replaced Rich Clarke on The Vodafone Big Top 40 with Kat Shoob, which airs on Sundays from 4pm to 7pm on Capital, Heart, and over 100 commercial music radio stations. He left the show in 2018.

On 11 March 2016, Global announced that Humes would take control of the Capital Late Show, which runs Monday-Thursday 10pm-1am, to replace Will Cozens.

It was announced that Humes would co-present One Love Manchester on Global Radio stations on 4 June 2017.

Humes presented his final Capital Late Show on 15 December 2022, and left the network after 10 years, former Capital Breakfast presenter Sonny Jay began hosting the show on 3 January 2023.

In April 2024, Humes joined Bauer stations Kiss and Kisstory to present a new weekday mid morning show.

=== Television ===
Humes made his television presenting debut on 23 August 2013, when he co-presented ITV's This Morning with his wife Rochelle Humes. The couple later became regular stand-in presenters until 2015. Humes was a regular reporter for ITV's Surprise Surprise programme, hosted by Holly Willoughby.

In September 2013, Humes was confirmed as Reggie Yates' replacement for the third series of BBC One's The Voice UK, which began on 11 January 2014. The show moved to ITV in 2017, without Humes as co-presenter.

Since 2016, Humes has co-presented BBC's Children in Need appeal with his wife, Rochelle Humes. He played Apollo Creed in an episode of The Keith & Paddy Picture Show.

On 20 November 2018, it was announced that Humes would co-host a music quiz show with wife Rochelle Humes on BBC One. The Hit List began in May 2019 and was recommissioned for a second series to air later that year. A third series was commissioned and was set to air in 2020.

On 19 November 2020, Humes guest presented the ITV daytime show Loose Women, by making history to be the first male presenter in the show's 21-year history as well as an all male panel.

In 2023, Humes participated in the twenty-third series of I'm a Celebrity...Get Me Out of Here!, and was sixth to be eliminated.

In 2026, Humes participated in the seventh series of The Masked Singer as "Can of Worms". He was unmasked in the seventh episode.

== Other ventures ==
=== Products and endorsements ===
In September 2010, a "Marvin doll" was launched, along with the other three members of JLS. Updated dolls were produced for the launch of JLS' 2nd album "Outta This World".

Durex teamed up with JLS to produce a condom range called "Just Love Safe", with each member of the group having their own box and Marvin's box being green. JLS also released their hoodie range.

In 2010, JLS endorsed Nintendo Wii Party appearing in seven different TV advertisements. JLS were also part of the Walkers crisps "Make sandwich more exciting" advertising campaign, their performance at Sandwich Technology School appeared on the television ad alongside other celebrities such as Gary Lineker, Pamela Anderson and Jenson Button.

In May 2020, Humes was announced as the Menswear ambassador for UK retailer Next.

=== Philanthropy ===
JLS founded "The JLS Foundation" a foundation that sets out to raise money for six charities: Cancer Research UK, Rays of Sunshine, Brook, Childline, BeatBullying and the MS Society. Despite the split, the foundation still exists and all members are still committed to continue the foundation.

All sales from the JLS number one single "Love You More" went to Children In Need. In 2012, JLS performed at the "Children In Need Rocks Manchester" concert performing "Take a Chance on Me". In 2013, JLS appeared on Children In Need for the last time, where the group sang a medley of songs on the EastEnders set.

JLS has also helped raise money for Comic Relief, appearing in comedy sketches with both Miranda Hart and James Corden.

In 2012, JLS visited Uganda for Sport Relief, appearing in emotional VT's across the night. The same year JLS released the official sport relief charity single "Proud", which peaked at number 6 in the chart, as well as hosting a special charity concert "JLS sing for Sport Relief" and doing the Sport Relief Mile.

In total, JLS have recorded five charity singles: a cover of Mariah Carey's song "Hero" as part of the X Factor 2008 finalists (for Help for Heroes), "Wishing On A Star" Xfactor finalists ft. JLS and One Direction (For organization Together for Short Lives) "Love You More" (for Children In Need), "Proud" (for Sport Relief) and "Everybody Hurts" (for Helping Haiti). Four out of five of these charity singles got to number one on the UK Singles Chart.

=== Online ===
In late 2013, Humes launched "The Marvin Humes Channel" a "website and app for iPhone or Android smartphone devices that allows you to catch up on Marvin's activity 24 hours a day". This platform is now defunct.

== Personal life ==
Humes is a fan of Chelsea F.C. His biggest inspiration is Michael Jackson.

Humes married The Saturdays singer Rochelle Wiseman on 27 July 2012 at Blenheim Palace. They have two daughters and one son. Humes was nominated for "Celebrity Dad of the Year 2013", but lost to Olympic gold medallist Mo Farah.

In June 2016, he played for England in the 2016 Soccer Aid, which was broadcast on ITV.

In August 2018, Humes was a subject of the UK genealogy programme Who Do You Think You Are? during which he learned that an ancestor was a black slave-holder from Jamaica.

== Filmography ==
Television

- K-Club – presenter
- Holby City (2000–2003) – Robbie Waring
- The X Factor (2008) – contestant, as part of JLS
- This Morning (2013–2015) – stand-in presenter, with Rochelle Humes
- Surprise Surprise (2013–2015) – reporter
- The Voice UK (2014–2016) – co-presenter, with Emma Willis
- Children in Need (2016–2018) – co-presenter, with Rochelle Humes
- The Keith & Paddy Picture Show (2017) – Apollo Creed
- MOBO Awards (2017) – co-presenter, with Maya Jama
- The Hit List (2019–present) - co-presenter, with Rochelle Humes
- Loose Women (2020) - Presenter, with panellists Ronan Keating, Roman Kemp and Iain Stirling
- I'm a Celebrity...Get Me Out of Here! (2023) - Contestant; Series 23
- DNA Journey (2025) - Himself (one episode)
- The Masked Singer (2026) - Contestant; Series 7
