= Eyes Wide Shut (song) =

2011 single by JLS

Single by JLS featuring Tinie Tempah

from the album Outta This World
- B-side: "Broken Strings"
- Released: 13 February 2011
- Recorded: 2010
- Genre: Dance-pop
- Length: 3:51
- Label: Epic
- Songwriters: Aston Merrygold; Oritsé Williams; Marvin Humes; JB Gill; Tim McEwan; Lars Halvor Jensen
- Producer: DEEKAY

JLS singles chronology
"Love You More" (2010)	"Eyes Wide Shut" (2011)	"She Makes Me Wanna" (2011)

Tinie Tempah singles chronology
"Invincible" (2010)	"Eyes Wide Shut" (2011)	"Wonderman" (2011)

"Eyes Wide Shut" is a song by English boy band JLS from their second studio album, Outta This World (2010). The song, written by JLS, and Tim McEwan and Lars Halvor Jensen of Danish production team DEEKAY, was released as the third single from the album on 13 February 2011. The single version of the track features guest vocals from English rapper Tinie Tempah. The song has peaked at number eight in the United Kingdom.

== Background ==
JLS recorded the track for inclusion on their second studio album, Outta This World. The band stated that the track was not originally intended to be released as a single, however, following a re-working of the track with rapper Tinie Tempah, Marvin revealed it was the obvious choice for a third single in an interview for Digital Spy: "He's the best rapper in the country and the only person we wanted to work with, so it would silly not to make it a single." The band performed the track live for the first time during the opening dates of their Outta This World arena tour, with Tinie Tempah performing the song with them at the London dates of the tour.

== Music video ==
The music video was shot in London in November 2010, and was directed by acclaimed American director Syndrome. Shot entirely against a green screen, Marvin Humes of the group noted that the video took strong influence from the Jim Henson film Labyrinth. The video depicts JLS singing and dancing in a fantasy world, and fighting their way through a series of enforced obstacles such as stone walls, trees etc., whilst a mysterious female figure floats above them throughout the duration of the video. The video premiered on the group's VEVO channel in January 2011.

== Reception ==
Robert Copsey of Digital Spy compared the song to Liberty X's "Thinking It Over". He gave the song 4 out of 5 stars and wrote, "Yes, the newer tune is more club-friendly-2011-stylee and features a guest rap from man of the mo Tinie Tempah, but the pop-garagey verses and R&B-lite, catchy-as-cholera chorus have a distinctly old-school feel to them that makes for yet another unstoppable chart missile from Marv & Co."

== Chart performance ==
The album version of the single made its UK chart debut 15 January 2011, when it debuted on the UK Singles Chart at number seventy-nine. The following week it jumped sixty-nine places to make its top-ten chart debut at number ten. On the chart dated 26 February 2011, the song peaked at number eight becoming the group's sixth top-ten UK hit, but their lowest-charting single at the time. The song's charting also gave Tinie Tempah his fifth UK top-ten single.

== Promotion ==
JLS appeared on Alan Carr Chatty Man to perform the song as well as giving an interview. The single was also promoted with performances on This Morning, Daybreak, Let's Dance for Comic Relief, and on the telethon night for Red Nose Day 2011, where the song was performed as part of a sketch with comedian Miranda Hart and Pineapple Dance Studios star Louie Spence.

== Track listing ==
1. "Eyes Wide Shut" (Single Version featuring Tinie Tempah) - 3:51
2. "Broken Strings" - 4:14

== Charts ==
=== Weekly charts ===
Chart (2011)	Peak position
Ireland (IRMA)	14
Scotland Singles (OCC)	9
UK Singles (OCC)	8
UK Airplay (Music Week)	3
UK Hip Hop/R&B (OCC)	3

=== Year-end charts ===
Chart (2011)	position
UK Singles (Official Charts Company)	71
UK Airplay (Music Week)	65

== Certifications ==
Region	Certification	Certified units/sales
United Kingdom (BPI)	Gold	400,000^{‡}
^{‡} Sales+streaming figures based on certification alone.

== Release history ==
Region	Date	Format	Label
United Kingdom	13 February 2011	Digital download	Epic Records
United Kingdom	14 February 2011	CD single	Epic Records
