= Ryan Davies (cricketer) =

English cricketer (born 1996)

Personal information
- Full name: Ryan Christopher Davies
- Born: 5 November 1996 (age 30); Thanet, Kent, England
- Height: 5 ft 9 in (1.75 m)
- Batting: Right-handed
- Role: Wicket-keeper

Domestic team information
- Years: Team
- 2015: Kent (squad no. 7)
- 2016–2017: Somerset (squad no. 77)
- 2018: Durham
- First-class debut: 7 June 2015 Kent v Derbyshire
- List A debut: 24 July 2016 Somerset v Glamorgan

Career statistics
Competition	FC	LA	T20
Matches	23	9	28
Runs scored	442	137	156
Batting average	14.73	34.25	10.40
100s/50s	0/3	0/1	0/0
Top score	86	61*	27
Catches/stumpings	43/6	10/1	13/4
- Source: CricInfo, 27 September 2018

Ryan Christopher Davies (born 5 November 1996) is an English professional cricketer who most recently played for Durham County Cricket Club. He is a right-handed batsman who also plays as a wicket-keeper.

Having joined Sandwich Town Cricket Club, he also played for Kent County Cricket Club from under-13 level onwards. Davies studied at Sandwich Technology School and The Canterbury Academy.

Having played back-up to regular wicket-keeper Sam Billings, Davies made his first-class debut for Kent against Derbyshire in June 2015 after Billings' call-up to the England One Day International team.

At the end of the 2015 season, having been made an offer of regular first-team cricket, Davies signed for Somerset County Cricket Club on a three-year deal.

In December 2015 he was named in England's squad for the 2016 Under-19 Cricket World Cup.

Davies made his maiden first-class half-century during a game against Hampshire on 27 June 2016. Sharing an unbroken stand of 82 with Craig Overton, Davies hit six fours and three sixes on his way to 52 not out off 39 balls.

On 24 July 2016 he made his List A debut against Glamorgan in the 2016 Royal London One-Day Cup.

In September 2017, after two seasons with Somerset, it was announced that Davies was to leave the county at the end of the season for personal reasons. He joined Durham during 2018, signing a two-eyer contract in May, and played regularly in Twenty20 matches as well as appearing three times during the season in first-class matches. He left the club before the start of the 2019 season, again for personal reasons.
