= Get Stupid (song) =

Single by Aston Merrygold
- Released: 24 July 2015
- Recorded: 2015
- Genre: Funk-pop
- Length: 3:19
- Label: Warner Bros.
- Songwriter(s): Aston Merrygold; Karen Poole; Sonny J Mason
- Producer(s): Sonny J Mason

Aston Merrygold singles chronology
"Get Stupid" (2015)	"Show Me" (2016)

"Get Stupid" is the debut solo single by British singer and former JLS member Aston Merrygold. It was released on 24 July 2015 as a digital download in the United Kingdom.

== Promotion ==
Aside from several TV performances upon the single's release, the track also garnered some attention following its inclusion in one of the official TV advertisements of the Samsung Galaxy S9 and was also extensively played back during the Samsung Unpacked event at the recently held MWC 2018.

== Music video ==
A music video to accompany the release of "Get Stupid" was first released onto YouTube on 26 May 2015 at a total length of four minutes and six seconds, where Merrygold can be seen singing and dancing to the tune of the song along with some companions inside a mall that has just closed for the night. Shooting for the music video took place at the Del Amo Fashion Center in Torrance, California, most notably Alfa Moda, one of the shops where they danced extensively on the music video.

== Track listing ==
Digital download (single)
No.	Title	Length
1.	"Get Stupid"	3:19

Digital download (remix)
No.	Title	Length
1.	"Get Stupid" (Chris Lake Remix)	5:10

== Chart performance ==
=== Weekly charts ===
Chart (2015)	Peak position
Australia (ARIA)	10
Ireland (IRMA)	72
Scotland (OCC)	15
UK Singles (OCC)	28
UK Singles Downloads (OCC)	16

=== Year-end charts ===
Chart (2015)	Position
Australia (ARIA)	95

== Certifications ==
Region	Certification	Certified units/sales
Australia (ARIA)	Platinum	70,000^{^}
^{^} Shipments figures based on certification alone.

== Release history ==
Country	Date	Format	Label
Ireland	24 July 2015	Digital download	Warner Bros.
United Kingdom	24 July 2015	Digital download	Warner Bros.
