= Eternal Love (JLS song) =

2021 single by JLS

Single by JLS

from the album 2.0
- Released: 3 September 2021
- Genre: Pop
- Length: 3:18
- Label: BMG
- Songwriters: Ed Sheeran; Steve Mac

JLS singles chronology
"Billion Lights" (2013)	"Eternal Love" (2021)	"Day One" (2021)

Music video
- JLS - Eternal Love on YouTube

"Eternal Love" is a song by British boy band JLS, released on 3 September 2021 as the lead single from their fifth studio album, 2.0. It marked the group's first new music since 2013. The song was written by Ed Sheeran and Steve Mac.

== Background and release ==
"Eternal Love" was released as JLS's comeback single after the group returned to recording following an extended break. The song was written by Ed Sheeran and Steve Mac.

According to Music Week, Sheeran had previously written "Lego House" with JLS in mind, and subsequently worked with Mac on a song specifically for the group.

The single was released through BMG and served as the lead single from 2.0, which was released on 3 December 2021.

== Music video ==
The music video for "Eternal Love" was directed by Ian Roderick Gray and released in 2021. Its concept sees JLS travelling through different eras of pop television, recreating the visual styles of various periods in the medium's history.

== Track listing ==
No.	Title	Writer(s)	Length
1.	"Eternal Love"	Ed Sheeran; Steve Mac	3:18

== Commercial performance ==
"Eternal Love" peaked at number 71 on the UK Singles Chart. It reached number 5 on both the UK Singles Sales Chart and the UK Singles Downloads Chart.

In October 2021, Music Week reported that the single had sold 30,386 copies at that point in time.

== Charts ==
Chart (2021)	Peak position
UK Singles	71
UK Singles Sales	5
UK Singles Downloads	5
UK Independent Singles	8
