= Ali Tennant =

British singer, songwriter and vocal producer/mentor

- Born: Lorne Alistair Tennant
- Origin: London, England
- Genres: Pop, R&B
- Occupations: Singer, songwriter, vocal producer, vocal coach
- Years active: 1998–present
- Website: www.ali-tennant.co.uk

Lorne Alistair Tennant, better known as Ali Tennant, is a British singer, songwriter and vocal producer/mentor from London signed to BMG Chrysalis.

== Performer ==
Tennant released one album Crucial under the name Ali in 1998 on Polydor, and a single "Bitter Honey".

== Songwriter ==
Beginning his songwriting career in 1998, he has had credits on 17 top ten albums, 7 of which hit number 1, as well as 4 singles, one of which debuted at number 1. Later years have seen Tennant vocal coach and produce for a number of high-profile clients such as The X Factor, The Voice UK, Jessie J (Alive), David Guetta (Nothing but the Beat), JLS (JLS, Outta This World, Jukebox, Evolution), the Saturdays (On Your Radar), Olly Murs (Olly Murs) and more.

== Songwriting credits ==
Year	Artist	Song	Album
1998	Five	"That's What You Told Me"	5ive
1999	Five	"Don't Fight It Baby"	Invincible
1999	Profyle	"I Won't Cry"	Whispers in the Dark
1999	Westlife	"Let's Make Tonight Special"	Westlife
2000	All Saints	"I Don't Wanna Be Alone"	Saints & Sinners
2001	Atomic Kitten	"You Are"	Right Now
2001	Blue	"Make It Happen"	All Rise
2002	Blue	"Invitation"	One Love
2002	Blue	"Like a Friend"	One Love
2002	Blue	"Privacy"	One Love
2002	Blue	"Without You"	One Love
2003	Blue	"Back It Up"	Guilty
2003	Blue	"Bubblin'"	Guilty
2003	Jamelia	"Club Hoppin"	Thank You
2007	Mutya Buena	"Suffer for Love"	Real Girl
2009	JLS	"Kickstart"	JLS
2009	JLS	"Only Tonight"	JLS
2010	JLS	"Better for You"	Outta This World
2010	JLS	"Don't Talk About Love"	Outta This World
2010	JLS	"Superhero"	Outta This World
2011	David Guetta featuring Jessie J	"Repeat"	Nothing but the Beat
2011	JLS	"Go Harder"	Jukebox
2011	JLS	"Take You Down"	Jukebox
2011	The Saturdays	"Promise Me"	On Your Radar
2011	The Saturdays	"Wish I Didn't Know"	On Your Radar
2012	JLS	"Hottest Girl in the World"	Evolution
2012	JLS	"Troublemaker"	Evolution
2012	JLS	"Proud"	Goodbye: The Greatest Hits
2012	Peter Andre	"Not a Love Song"	Angels & Demons
2012	Tulisa	"Live Your Life"	The Female Boss
2012	Tulisa	"Young"	The Female Boss
2013	Jessie J	"Magnetic"	Alive
2013	Jessie J	"Hero"	Alive/Kick-Ass 2 OST
2013	JLS	"Billion Lights"	Goodbye: The Greatest Hits
2015	Iris Gold	"Goldmine"	Non-album single
2015	Nathan Sykes	"Kiss Me Quick"	Unfinished Business

== Vocal coaching ==
- The X Factor (2010)
- The Voice UK (2012–present)
