= Aston Merrygold =

English media personality (born 1988)

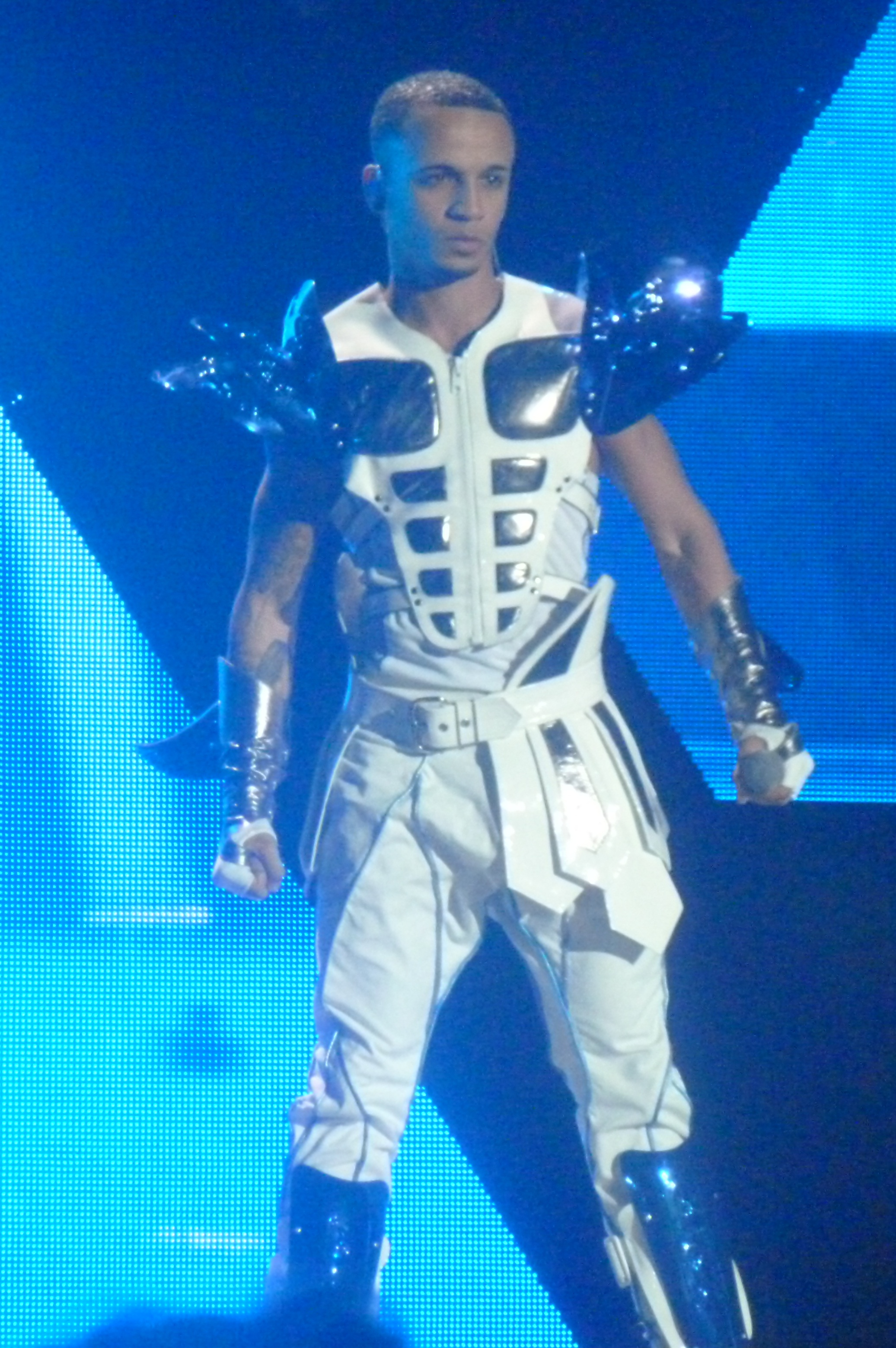
- Merrygold in 2012
- Born: Aston Iain Merrygold; 13 February 1988 (age 38); Peterborough, Cambridgeshire, England
- Occupations: Singer; songwriter; actor; dancer; television presenter
- Years active: 2002–present
- Agent: Logan Media Entertainment
- Television: The X Factor; Got to Dance; Almost Never; The Masked Singer UK
- Spouse: Sarah Richards (m. 2022)
- Children: 3
- Musical career
- Genres: R&B; pop; dance; hip hop; soul
- Instrument: Vocals
- Years active: 2002–present
- Labels: RCA; Warner Bros.; Sony
- Member of: JLS
- Website: astonmerrygold.com

Aston Iain Merrygold (born 13 February 1988) is a British singer-songwriter, dancer, actor and television presenter. He is known for being a member of the British boy band JLS, who were the runners-up to Alexandra Burke in the fifth series of The X Factor. As part of the group he achieved five number one singles on the UK singles chart and a number one album on the UK Albums Chart. As of December 2013, JLS had sold over 10 million records before disbanding in 2013 and reuniting in 2020. In 2013, he became a judge on the British dance talent show Got to Dance.

Merrygold worked on his debut solo album Showstopper for a planned mid-2016 release, but it remains unreleased. The lead single of the album, "Get Stupid" was released on 24 July 2015 and reached number ten on the ARIA Charts and was certified Platinum. In August 2017, he was announced as a contestant for the fifteenth series of Strictly Come Dancing, and was controversially eliminated on 5 November 2017, coming in tenth place. Merrygold has also appeared in television series including Fun Song Factory and Almost Never.

In 2024, Merrygold starred in the UK tour of The Wizard of Oz as the Tin Man, and reprised the role in the West End at the Gillian Lynne Theatre.

== Early life ==
Merrygold was born on 13 February 1988 to a Jamaican father and a Northern Irish mother, who split up when Merrygold was young. He is one of seven children: he has five brothers and one sister between his biological and step parents. He was born and raised in Peterborough by his mother Siobhan and stepfather, Orjan; where he attended Jack Hunt School. Merrygold stated that he loved to dance and perform and certain TV appearances got him into singing. Through auditions, he met future band member Marvin Humes and they stayed in contact. Whilst still attending secondary school, he played football on behalf of England in the European Youth Games.

== Career ==
=== 2002–2013: Career beginnings and JLS ===
In 2002, he entered Stars in Their Eyes where he appeared as Michael Jackson, singing "Rockin' Robin". He finished in second place. Shortly afterwards, Merrygold took on a job as an entertainer at Pop Star Studios in Fletton Peterborough, eventually leaving to follow his musical career. Merrygold performed in school productions and, after leaving school in 2004, was cast in the ITV children's programme Fun Song Factory, alongside presenter Laura Hamilton.

Friend Marvin Humes had already successfully auditioned to become a member of UFO, (later JLS), formed by Oritse Williams when Humes encouraged Aston to audition. Merrygold and JB Gill were recruited soon after, and they changed their name to JLS. In 2008, they auditioned for the fifth series of The X Factor, where they went on to finish in second place to Alexandra Burke. After the series finished, JLS signed with record label Epic Records The band have released four studio albums (JLS, Outta This World, Jukebox, and Evolution) and appeared in a film, JLS: Eyes Wide Open. In August 2012, Merrygold was confirmed as a judge on the fourth series of the Sky One dance talent show Got to Dance and would appear alongside Diversity dancer Ashley Banjo and former Pussycat Dolls member Kimberly Wyatt. Merrygold said the experience had been "inspiring". In 2014, it was confirmed that he would not be returning to the show due to pursuing other projects. On 22 December 2013, JLS performed for the last time.

=== 2014–present: Solo career ===
On 23 September 2014, Merrygold signed with Warner Bros. Records to release his debut album Showstopper, preceded by lead single "Get Stupid" on 24 July 2015. He premiered the "Get Stupid" video on 26 May 2015. Merrygold then announced that he would be releasing a six-track EP instead of the Showstopper album, titled Precious. Merrygold posted a yellow picture on his Twitter and Instagram accounts, asking fans to "play around" with the filters to reveal a "hidden message", which revealed the name of the EP and its release date, 28 April 2017. Only the single "Precious" was included on the EP. On going solo, Merrygold has explained that he can be "expressive as [he likes]" rather than considering what his fellow JLS members would think of a song.

On 5 May 2017, Merrygold released the single "Trudy". On 27 May 2017, Merrygold guest presented an episode of The Playlist. In August 2017, Merrygold was announced as a contestant for the fifteenth series of Strictly Come Dancing. He was partnered with professional dancer Janette Manrara and reached the seventh week of the competition, losing the dance off to Mollie King and AJ Pritchard. The decision to eliminate Merrygold instead of King was not popular with viewers and bosses, who went on social media to vent their anger at the decision. In February 2018, Merrygold's 2015 single Get Stupid featured in a newly launched TV commercial released by Samsung promoting the Galaxy S9 smartphone. Merrygold was picked in July 2018 as Elvis Duran's Artist of the Month. He was featured on NBC's Today show hosted by Hoda Kotb and Kathie Lee Gifford, broadcast nationally in the United States on 19 July 2018 where he performed a live version of his single "Get Stupid". In 2019, he was cast in the CBBC series Almost Never as Jordan. He stated that he used his knowledge of the music industry, particularly from his time with JLS, as inspiration for the role.

From 2020 to 2021, Merrygold competed in the ITV singing series The Masked Singer UK as Robin; he finished in third place. He chose the alias of Robin because Robin from DC Comics's real name is Dick Grayson and Merrygold's son's name is Grayson. In 2022, Merrygold returned in the third series final masked as Robin to perform a duet with Charlotte Church masked as Mushroom.

In September 2021, Merrygold became a judge on the Irish talent show The Big Deal along with Boy George, Jedward, Lyra, and Deirdre O'Kane.

== Personal life ==
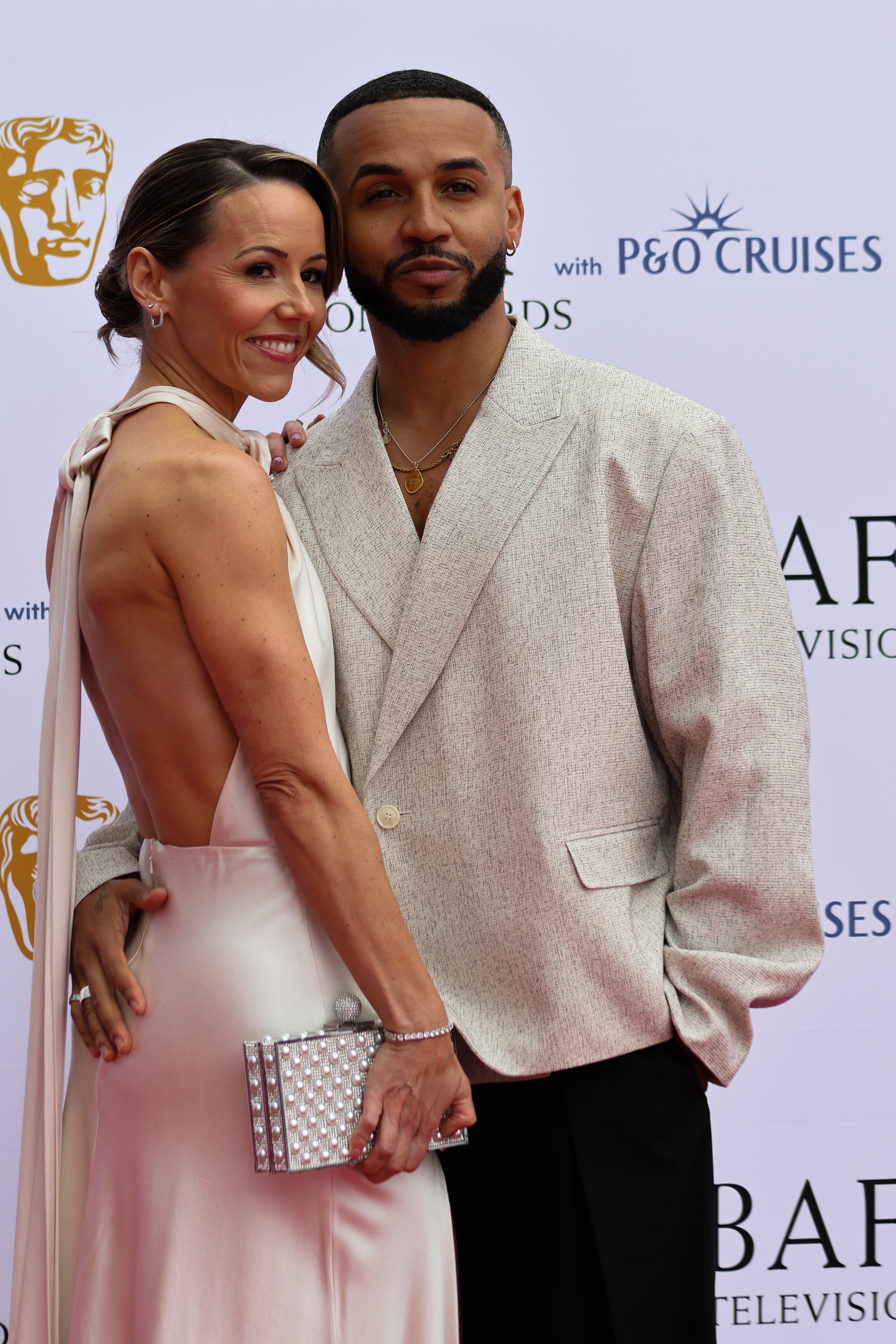
Merrygold and Richards in 2026

Merrygold is a supporter of Arsenal F.C. He has numerous tattoos, including three stars behind his right ear, two stars on his pelvis, a music note between his shoulder blades and a sleeve which consists of a tattoo of Michael Jackson, whom he cited as an inspiration. In 2011, Merrygold’s close childhood friend Lisa died in an accident. As a tribute, he got her face tattooed on his forearm.

In September 2017, Merrygold announced via Instagram that his partner, Sarah Louise Richards, was expecting a baby. He said that her pregnancy had encouraged him to take part in Strictly Come Dancing. The couple announced their engagement in December 2017. On 30 January 2018, Richards gave birth to their first son. Their second son was born on 5 June 2020. They wed in September 2022. In March 2024, they announced the birth of their third child.

== Other ventures ==
=== Product and endorsements ===
In September 2010, an "Aston doll" was launched, alongside the other 3 members of JLS. Durex teamed up with JLS to produce a condom range called "Just Love Safe", with each member of the group having their own box. In 2010, Merrygold alongside Gill, Humes and Williams endorsed Nintendo Wii Party, appearing in 7 different TV adverts. JLS were also part of the Walkers crisps "Make sandwich more exciting" advertising campaign. This resulted in the band doing a surprise performance at Sandwich Technology School, which appeared on the television advertisement. Merrygold also appeared on advertisements for Coca-Cola in the UK promoting their 'Share a Coke' range.

=== Philanthropy ===
JLS founded "The JLS Foundation", a foundation that sets out to raise money for 6 different charities: Cancer Research UK, Rays of Sunshine, Brook, Childline, Beat Bullying and the MS Society. Despite the band's split, the foundation still remains active. Merrygold is an ambassador for the charity BeatBullying, a cause he "feels strongly about" after enduring racial bullying growing up. Merrygold has appeared on Children in Need nights since 2010. All sales from the JLS number one single "Love You More" went to Children In Need. In 2011, Merrygold did a VT for the charity in which he met 7-year-old Emily, who suffers from osteogenesis imperfecta. In 2012, JLS performed at the "Children in Need Rocks Manchester" concert, performing "Take a Chance on Me". In 2013, Merrygold appeared on Children in Need for the last time as a member of JLS where the group sang a medley of JLS songs at the BBC One soap opera EastEnders set.

JLS also helped raise money for Comic Relief, appearing in comedy sketches with both Miranda Hart and James Corden. In 2012, JLS visited Uganda for Sport Relief, and appeared in VTs throughout the show. In the same year, JLS also released the official Sport Relief charity single "Proud", which peaked at number 6 in the chart, as well as hosting a special charity concert "JLS Sing for Sport Relief" and doing the Sport Relief Mile.

== Discography ==
=== Extended plays ===
| Title | Details |
|---|---|
| Precious | Released: 28 April 2017; Label: Warner Bros. Records; Format: Digital download, CD |

=== Singles ===
==== As lead artist ====
| Title | Year | Peak chart positions | | | | Album |
| Title | Year | UK | AUS | IRE | SCO | Album |
|---|---|---|---|---|---|---|
| "Get Stupid" | 2015 | 28 | 10 | 72 | 15 | Non-album singles |
| "Show Me" | 2015 | — | — | — | — | Non-album singles |
| "I Ain't Missing You" (featuring LDN Noise) | 2016 | 126 | — | — | 70 | Non-album singles |
| "Too Late" | 2016 | — | — | — | — | Non-album singles |
| "One Night in Paris" | 2017 | — | — | — | — | Non-album singles |
| "Precious" (featuring Shy Carter) | 2017 | — | — | — | 74 | Precious |
| "Trudy" | 2017 | — | — | — | — | Non-album singles |
| "Across My Heart" (featuring Gawler) | 2018 | — | — | — | — | Non-album singles |
| "Bon Appetit" | 2018 | — | — | — | — | Non-album singles |
| "Poison Ivy" | 2018 | — | — | — | — | Non-album singles |
| "Whine Up" | 2019 | — | — | — | — | Non-album singles |
| "Overboard" | 2021 | — (Note: "Overboard" did not enter the UK Singles Chart, but peaked at number 63 on the UK Singles Downloads Chart.) | — | — | — | Non-album singles |
| "Share a Coke" | 2021 | — (Note: "Share a Coke" did not enter the UK Singles Chart, but peaked at number 93 on the UK Singles Downloads Chart.) | — | — | — | Non-album singles |
| "Hundreds and Thousands" | 2021 | — | — | — | — | Non-album singles |
| "Emergency" | 2021 | — | — | — | — | Non-album singles |
"—" denotes a recording that did not chart or was not released.

==== As featured artist ====
| Title | Year | Peak chart positions | Album |
| Title | Year | AUS | Album |
|---|---|---|---|
| "Money Maker" (Throttle featuring LunchMoney Lewis and Aston Merrygold) | 2016 | 65 | Non-album singles |
| "Rockstar" (LDN Noise featuring Aston Merrygold) | 2017 | — | Non-album singles |
"—" denotes a recording that did not chart or was not released.
