= Hold Me Down / Give Me Life =

"Hold Me Down" / "Give Me Life"

Single by JLS

from the album Evolution
- Released: 14 December 2012
- Recorded: 2012
- Genre: Pop; R&B; soul
- Length: 3:31 ("Hold Me Down"); 3:06 ("Give Me Life")
- Label: Epic
- Songwriters: JLS; Rodney Jerkins; Wayne Hector; Eric Bellinger
- Producer: Rodney Jerkins

JLS singles chronology
"Hottest Girl in the World" (2012)	"Hold Me Down" / "Give Me Life" (2012)	"Billion Lights" (2013)

"Hold Me Down" / "Give Me Life" is a double A-side single released by English boy band JLS as the second single from the group's fourth studio album, Evolution. The single was released in the United Kingdom on 14 December 2012. The single peaked at No. 112 on the UK Singles Chart, becoming the band's worst performing single.

The group was originally slated to release only "Give Me Life" on 23 December, but opted for "Hold Me Down" due to "fan demand".

== Track listing ==
Digital download
No.	Title	Length
1.	"Hold Me Down"	3:31
2.	"Give Me Life" (Single Mix)	3:06
3.	"Give Me Life" (The Alias Remix)	6:03
4.	"Give Me Life" (Nathan C Club Mix)	5:41

== Credits and personnel ==
- Lead vocals – JLS
- Producers – Rodney Jerkins
- Lyrics – JLS, Rodney Jerkins, Wayne Hector, Eric Bellinger
- Label: Epic Records

== Chart performance ==
Chart (2012)	Peak position
UK Hip Hop/R&B (OCC)	13
UK Singles (Official Charts Company)	112

== Release history ==
Region	Date	Format	Label
United Kingdom	14 December 2012	Digital download	Epic Records
