= Billion Lights =

Single by JLS

from the album Goodbye – The Greatest Hits
- Released: 17 November 2013
- Recorded: 2013
- Genre: R&B; pop; dance-pop
- Length: 3:32
- Label: Epic
- Songwriter(s): Camille Purcell; Ali Tennant

JLS singles chronology
"Hold Me Down" (2012)	"Billion Lights" (2013)	"Eternal Love" (2021)

Music video
- "Billion Lights" on YouTube

"Billion Lights" is a song by British boy band JLS. The song is the only single (other than their 2012 charity single "Proud") from their greatest hits album, and fifth album overall, Goodbye – The Greatest Hits (2013). It was released on 17 November 2013, the day before the album, as JLS's second single before their split.

== Background and promotion ==
On 15 December 2012, Marvin Humes revealed that JLS were to release their fifth album in 2013. "By the time 2013 rolls round it'll be time for our fifth album," he said. "This is usually a greatest hits in boy band territory but we don't know if we're ready for that yet. There will definitely be an album next year. There's a lot of competition for us – not just from other boy bands. So we have to stay ahead of the game and stay relevant coming up with new hits." On 1 February 2013, it was confirmed that work on the album had begun. On 26 March 2013, Humes announced that the band were heading out to Los Angeles to record the album: "We're booked in to go to LA and work with Rodney Jerkins again and are looking at some new people too."

On 24 April 2013, JLS announced that they would be splitting after six years together. In a statement on their official website, the band said that they would release a greatest hits album, titled Goodbye – The Greatest Hits, and complete their third and final arena tour. On 24 April 2013, they confirmed plans to release Goodbye – The Greatest Hits in late 2013, preceded by a new single, to coincide with their farewell arena tour across the UK - the Goodbye: The Greatest Hits Tour.

On 26 September, JLS's management tweeted that the band's last ever single would be called "Billion Lights" and also revealed the artwork, "So...We're very excited to finally share this!! The brand new JLS single is called ‘Billion Lights’!! :) JLSHQx". "Billion Lights" was written especially for the band's Greatest Hits album by Camille Purcell and Ali Tennant, who wrote JLS's 2012 single "Hottest Girl in the World". It was later revealed that the single would be released on 17 November, followed by the release of Goodbye – The Greatest Hits the following day. During an exclusive interview for the Official Charts Company, JB Gill said: "Billion Lights is also a celebration. We wanted to make sure we came with something that is up-tempo, that's traditional of JLS... You're gonna see us singing and dancing in the video. You're gonna feel the vibe for sure! We're really, really proud of it."

JLS performed "Billion Lights" live on Strictly Come Dancing on 17 November 2013.

== Critical reception ==
Writing for the Daily Record, John Dingwall gave the album 3 stars out of 5 and wrote: "AFTER five number one singles, JLS release their final song. While One Direction's fame has surpassed them, 1D owe them a huge debt. Their final song is a brassy club banger that's all about fun. They’re dancing out the room rather than being dragged. Hats off." Robert Copsey of Digital Spy said, ""We ignite the sky/ A billion lights tonight," they sing over strobing beats and ravey synths, recalling their consistently energetic live showings in all their back-flipping and pec-posing glory. It's sad, then, that the production is arguably their laziest and most dated yet, suggesting their end has arrived not a moment too soon." He gave the song 2/5.

== Music video ==
On 29 August 2013, JLS' management tweeted "Last video shoot with JLS today sad day but don't worry it's going to be a good one." The video was released on 4 October 2013.

== Charts ==
Chart (2013)	Peak position
Ireland (IRMA)	31
Scotland (OCC)	15
UK Singles (OCC)	19

== Release history ==
Region	Date	Label	Format
Ireland	14 November 2013	Epic Records	Digital download, CD single
United Kingdom	17 November 2013	Epic Records	Digital download, CD single
