= Proud (JLS song) =

2012 single by JLS

Single by JLS

from the album Goodbye – The Greatest Hits
- Released: 16 March 2012
- Recorded: 2011
- Genre: R&B
- Length: 4:02
- Label: Epic; Sony Music
- Songwriters: Oritsé Williams; Marvin Humes; Jonathan Gill; Aston Merrygold; Ali Tennant; Mich Hansen; Jason Gill; Daniel Davidsen
- Producers: Cutfather; Jason Gill; Daniel Davidsen; Ali Tennant

JLS singles chronology
"Do You Feel What I Feel?" (2011)	"Proud" (2012)	"Hottest Girl in the World" (2012)

"Proud" is a song by British boy band JLS, which serves as the official Sport Relief charity single for 2012, and appears on the festive edition of the group's fourth studio album, Evolution. The single was released on 16 March 2012. The song was written by co-written by JLS, Daniel Davidsen, Jason Gill, Jonathan Gill, Cutfather, and Ali Tennant. The single sold nearly 45,000 copies during its first week of sales, peaking at number 6 on the UK Singles Chart.

== Music video ==
A music video to accompany the release of "Proud" was first released onto YouTube on 10 February 2012 at a total length of four minutes and eight seconds. The video sees JLS walk around Wembley Stadium at night, interspersed with shots of children being inspired by sports. Olympic athletes Philips Idowu, Rebecca Adlington and Louis Smith also make an appearance carrying the British flag.

== Critical reception ==
Robert Copsey of Digital Spy gave the song a positive review stating: "As charity singles stand, it ticks all the necessary boxes: a twinkly piano riff, light R&B beats and the words "stronger", "wiser" and, of course "proud" jammed in as many times as possible. As an exercise in schmaltzy midtempo balladry, it passes with flying colours - though points are deducted due to the lack of key change in the finale.". Ironically, during the band's reunion tour Beat Again Tour in 2021, the song was performed with an added key change at the end.

== Chart performance ==
In Ireland, the song debuted at number twenty-eight. "Proud" debuted at number six in the United Kingdom, with first-week sales of nearly 45,000, copies. However, the track only spent two weeks inside the Top 40.

== Track listing ==
1. "Proud" – 4:02
2. "Proud" (Cutmore Radio Remix) – 3:21

== Charts ==
Weekly chart performance for "Proud"
Chart (2012)	Peak position
Ireland (IRMA)	28
Scotland Singles (OCC)	6
UK Singles (OCC)	6
UK Airplay (Music Week)	34

== Release history ==
Release history and formats for "Proud"
Region	Date	Label	Format	Ref.
United Kingdom	16 March 2012	Epic Records; Sony Music	Digital download; CD single	
