= Oritsé Williams =

British singer (born 1986)

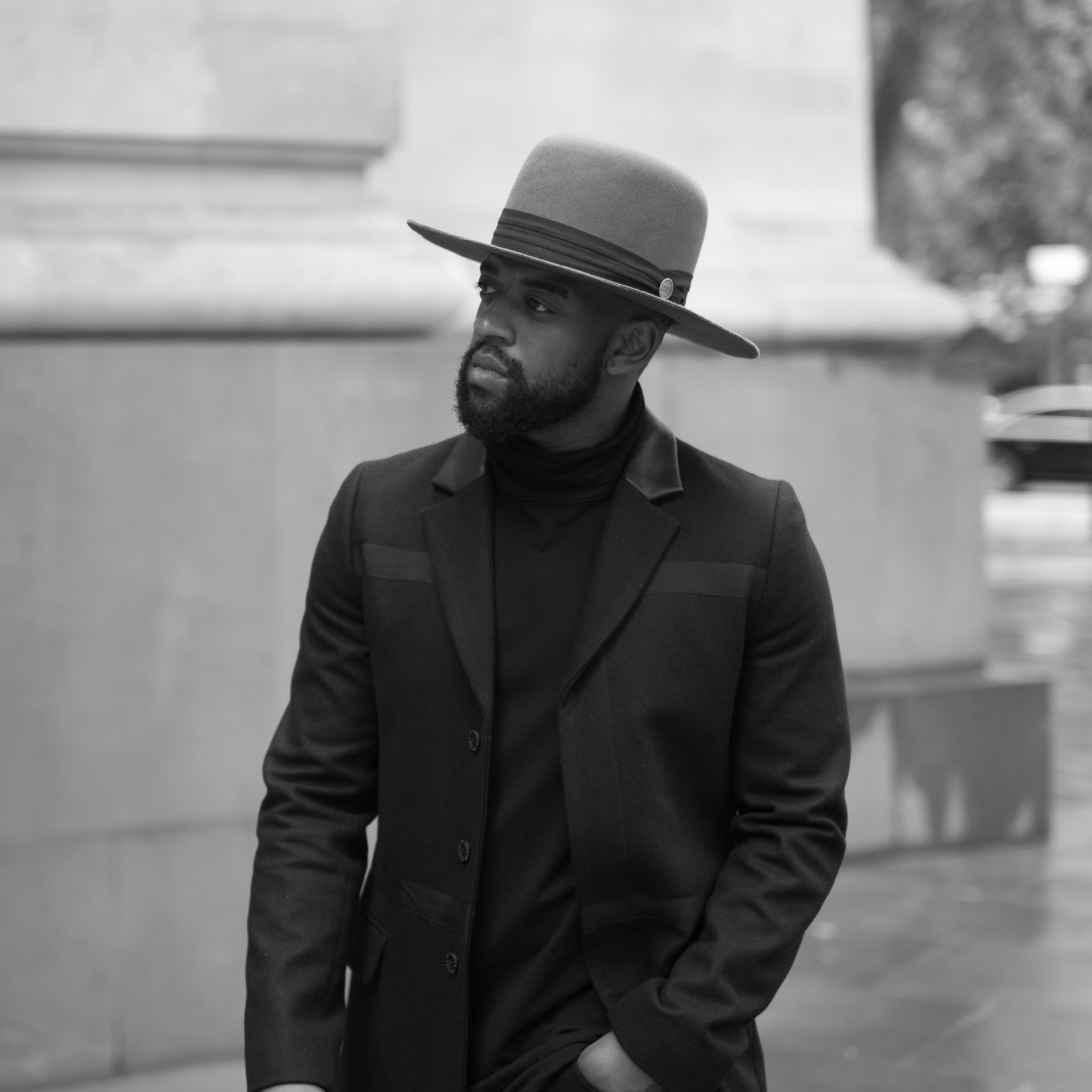
- Oritsé at LCM 2016
- Born: Oritsé Jolomi Matthew Soloman Williams; 27 November 1986 (age 39); London, England
- Occupations: Singer; songwriter
- Years active: 2006–present
- Children: 2
- Musical career
- Genres: R&B; pop; hip hop; dance
- Instrument: Vocals
- Labels: Epic; O-Street; Overthrow
- Website: oritsewilliams.com

Signature
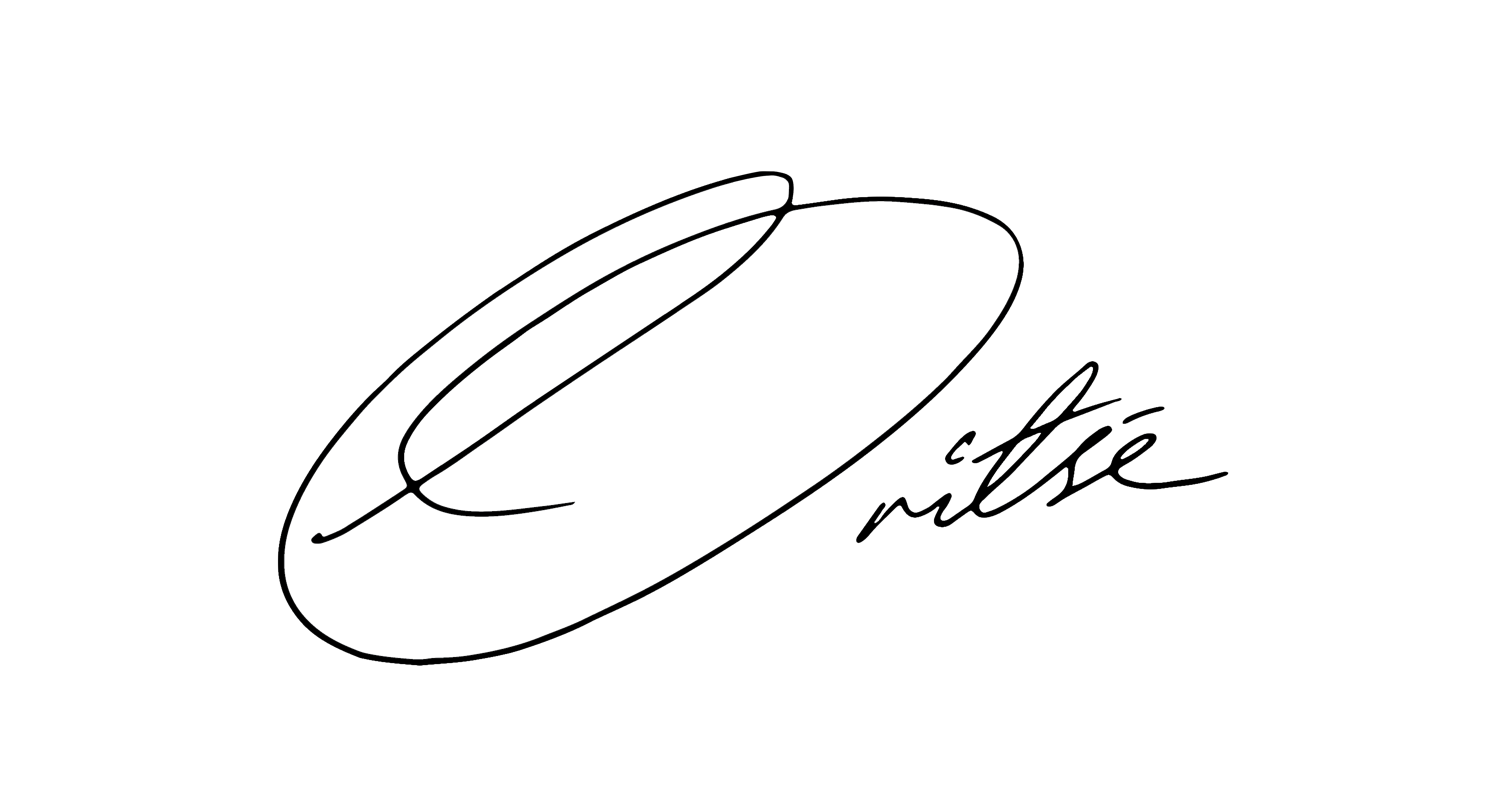

Oritsé Jolomi Matthew Soloman Williams (/oʊˈriːʃeɪ/ oh-REE-shay; born 27 November 1986), professionally as Oritsé, is a British singer. He is best known as the founding member of the boy band JLS, who were runners-up to Alexandra Burke on the fifth series of The X Factor in 2008. JLS sold over 10 million records before disbanding in December 2013. Williams also won the ITV dancing competition Stepping Out in September 2013.

== Early life ==
Oritsé Williams was born on 27 November 1986 in London. He is of Nigerian and Caribbean descent. Since the age of 12, Williams has cared for his mother, who was diagnosed with multiple sclerosis, and his two brothers and sister. He attended Larmenier & Sacred Heart Primary School in West London, where he learnt to play the trumpet. He also attended British International School, Lagos, Nigeria and the Cardinal Vaughan Memorial School.

== Career ==
=== 2006–2013: JLS ===
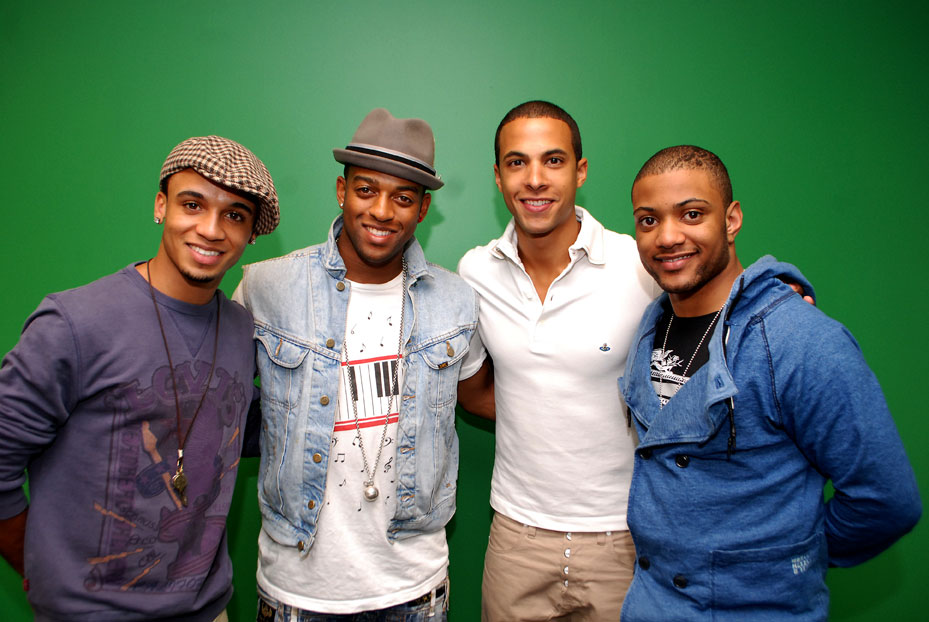
JLS in Chicago, April 2010

In 2007, Williams and his brother came up with a "grand plan" to cure their mother's MS. His brother was studying to be a scientist to find a cure for the condition, whilst Williams was going to back him up through his love of music. Williams then set up a boy band called UFO ("Unique Famous Outrageous") with Aston Merrygold, Marvin Humes and JB Gill. In 2008, UFO auditioned for the fifth series of The X Factor, but changed their name to JLS ("Jack the Lad Swing") as there was already a rock band called UFO. JLS made it all the way to the final, finishing as runners-up behind Alexandra Burke.

Since being on The X Factor, JLS have sold over 10 million records worldwide and had four UK top three albums and five UK number-one singles. They have also won five MOBO Awards and two BRIT Awards. In September 2010, they launched a range of condoms called "Just Love Safe". In February 2011, they teamed up with Burke to release a clothing range.

On 24 April 2013, JLS made the announcement that they would split after the release of their fifth album, Goodbye – The Greatest Hits. In a statement, they said: "We wanted to make sure that you heard it from the four of us, that we have decided to bring our time as a band to an end." When they appeared on Alan Carr: Chatty Man to discuss splitting up, Williams remained silent at first whilst bandmates Merrygold, Humes and Gill spoke, but he finally broke down in tears and had to be comforted by Humes.

=== 2013–present: Life after JLS ===
==== Stepping Out ====
In August and September 2013, Williams took part in the ITV dancing show Stepping Out, reaching the final against Brian McFadden and his wife Vogue. Williams went on to win the series on 28 September 2013.

- Note: In week 4, the challenge was for each celebrity to dance with someone else's partner in the "Wife Swap" challenge. Oritsé danced once with AJ and the second time with Brian's partner Vogue, her scores are not displayed on the chart below.

Week	Dance	Judges' scores				Result
Week	Dance	Wayne Sleep	Mel B	Jason Gardiner	Total	Result
1	Tap dance	8; 8	10; 10	9; 8	53	Safe
2	Salsa	8; 9	10; 10	9; 10	56	Safe
3	Quickstep	9; 10	10; 10	8; 8	55	Safe
4	Bollywood	10; 10	10; 10	10; 10	60	Safe
4	Jazz	10	10	10	30	Safe
5	Rumba/Salsa	10, 10; 10, 10	10, 10; 10, 10	10, 9; 10, 10	119	Winners

==== Name change and Waterline ====
Oritsé changed his stage name to OWS and announced his first solo album Waterline to be released in June 2015 available on iTunes.: During this period Williams was managed by John Proctor at Total Artist Management.

== Other ventures ==
=== Products and endorsements ===
In September 2010, an "Oritsé doll" was launched, along with the other 3 members of JLS. Updated dolls were produced for the launch of JLS' second album Outta This World.

Durex teamed up with JLS to produce a condom range called "Just Love Safe", with each member of the group having their own box. Oritsé's box being red. JLS also released their iconic hoodie range, with Oritsé's Hoodie being, again, red.

In 2010 Williams alongside Gill, Humes and Merrygold endorsed Nintendo Wii Party appearing in 7 different TV adverts. JLS were also part of the Walkers crisps "Make sandwich more exciting" advertising campaign, their performance at Sandwich Technology School appeared on the television ad alongside other celebrities such as Gary Lineker, Pamela Anderson and Jenson Button.

=== Philanthropy ===
Oritsé and the other 3 members founded "The JLS Foundation" a foundation that sets out to raise money for 6 different charities: Cancer Research UK, Rays of Sunshine, Brook, Childline, Beat Bullying and the MS Society. Despite the split, the foundation still exists and all members are still committed to continue the foundation.

Oritsé was an ambassador for the MS society, a charity that helps raise money and awareness of Multiple sclerosis; an illness that Oritsé's mother was diagnosed with when he was younger. He left the role after being arrested.

All sales from the JLS number one single Love You More went to Children in Need. In 2012 JLS performed at the "Children in Need Rocks Manchester" concert performing Take a Chance on Me. In 2013 Aston appeared on Children in Need for the last time as a member of JLS where the group sang a medley of JLS songs at the EastEnders set.

Oritsé, along with the rest of JLS, have also helped raise money for Comic Relief, appearing in comedy sketches with both Miranda Hart and James Corden.

In 2012, all the JLS members visited Uganda for Sport Relief appearing in emotional VT's across the night. The same year JLS released the official Sport Relief charity single, Proud which peaked at number 6 in the Official UK Singles chart, as well as hosting a special charity concert "JLS sing for Sport Relief" and doing the Sport Relief Mile.

In total JLS have appeared in 5 charity singles: A cover of "Hero" as part of the X Factor 2008 finalists (for Help for Heroes), Wishing on a Star X Factor finalists ft. JLS and One Direction (for organization Together for Short Lives) "Love You More" (for Children in Need), "Proud" (for Sport Relief) and "Everybody Hurts" (for Helping Haiti). 4 out of 5 of these charity singles went to number one on the Official UK Singles chart.

== Legal issues ==
In September 2018, Williams was charged with the rape of a fan in Wolverhampton. A second individual was charged with assault by penetration in connection with the same incident. Oritsé appeared in court on 11 October. His trial began at Wolverhampton Crown Court on 14 May 2019. Oritsé was tried in front of a jury of eight women and four men who deliberated for around two hours before unanimously acquitting Williams of all charges.
