= Do You Feel What I Feel? =

Single by JLS

from the album Jukebox
- B-side: "Pieces of My Heart"
- Released: 1 January 2012
- Genre: R&B; dance-pop
- Length: 3:13
- Label: Epic; Sony
- Songwriters: Gloria Shayne Baker; Tebey; Julian Bunetta; Noël Regney; John Ryan
- Producer: Julian Bunetta

JLS singles chronology
"Wishing on a Star" (2012)	"Do You Feel What I Feel?" (2012)	"Proud" (2012)

"Do You Feel What I Feel?" is a song by British boy band JLS from their third studio album, Jukebox. It was released as the album's third and final single on 1 January 2012. The song was written by Gloria Shayne Baker, Tebey, Julian Bunetta, Noël Regney, John Ryan, and it was produced by Bunetta. The song samples Bing Crosby's classic festive hit "Do You Hear What I Hear?". The song charted at number 16 on the UK Singles Chart becoming their first single to miss the top 10.

== Music video ==
On 24 November 2011, the band announced on their website that the video for song will be live on 25 November. The preview pictures for the accompanying music video show the band in a winter setting and having a house party in the snow with Akai Osei, winner of Got To Dance, as Aston Merrygold's cousin. The video was uploaded to JLS's official VEVO channel on 25 November, at a total length of three minutes and fifty-two seconds. The video was nominated for, and then later won "Best Video" at the 2012 MOBO Awards, giving the band their fifth MOBO award in four years. The video features radio presenter Eddie Nestor acting the part of Aston's uncle.

== Live performances ==
The group performed the song live for the first time on 18 November 2011 on the Children in Need 2011 telethon. The group once again performed the song on 25 November on The Graham Norton Show, and on their special for Channel 4's The Album Chart Show on 27 November. On 9 December, they performed the song with a live band for the Live Lounge section of Fearne Cotton's BBC Radio 1 show along with a cover of the Labrinth hit "Earthquake". They also performed the single on the New Year's Eve special of Alan Carr: Chatty Man. On 18 February 2012, they performed the song on the first live show of Let's Dance for Sport Relief. For the band's Christmas special, A Very JLS Christmas, they recorded a brand new remix of the song, featuring Alesha Dixon:

== Track listings ==
- CD single
1. "Do You Feel What I Feel?" - 3:13
2. "Pieces of My Heart" - 3:54
3. "Do You Feel What I Feel?" (Sunship Remix) (featuring Alesha Dixon) - 3:45
- Digital download
1. "Do You Feel What I Feel?" - 3:13
2. "Do You Feel What I Feel?" (Kardinal Beats Remix) - 3:09
3. "Pieces of My Heart" - 3:54
4. "Do You Feel What I Feel? (Music Video)" - 3:51

== Chart performance ==
Chart (2011–12)	Peak position
Ireland (IRMA)	29
Scottish Singles Sales (Official Charts)	15
Slovakia Airplay (ČNS IFPI)	59
UK Singles (Official Charts)	16
UK Airplay (Music Week)	46

== Release history ==
Country	Date	Format
Ireland	30 December 2011	Digital download
United Kingdom	1 January 2012	Digital download
United Kingdom	2 January 2012	CD single
