= Love You More (JLS song) =

2010 single by JLS

Single by JLS

from the album Outta This World
- B-side: "You Got My Love"
- Released: 12 November 2010
- Recorded: 11 April 2010
- Genre: R&B
- Length: 3:48
- Label: Epic
- Songwriters: Aston Merrygold; Oritsé Williams; Marvin Humes; JB Gill; Wayne Hector; Toby Gad
- Producer: Toby Gad

JLS singles chronology
"The Club Is Alive" (2010)	"Love You More" (2010)	"Eyes Wide Shut" (2011)

Children in Need singles chronology
"The Official BBC Children in Need Medley" (2009)	"Love You More" (2010)	"Teardrop" (2011)

"Love You More" is a song by English boy band JLS from their second studio album, Outta This World (2010). The band co-wrote the song with Toby Gad (who also helmed production) and Wayne Hector. It was released as the band's second single from the album on 11 April 2010. The track serves as the official Children in Need charity single for 2010. "Love You More" debuted at number one on the UK Singles Chart on 21 November 2010, making it JLS's fourth number-one single. The video for the song premiered on the group's YouTube channel on 1 October 2010.

== Background ==
JLS recorded the track for inclusion on their second studio album, Outta This World. The band stated that the track was not originally intended to be released as a single, however, after being asked to release 2010's official Children in Need single, they believed that no other tracks from the album would be suitable. The band officially announced the single following rumours that they would themselves be doing some special fundraising for the event. The band have agreed to waive all royalties on the track, with 100% of profits and sales being donated to Children In Need. They describe the song as "a soulful ballad, which involves us demonstrating smooth R&B vocals with tender, heartfelt lyrics".

== Music video ==
The video for "Love You More" (directed by Sanji) was shot months in advance of its release, in August 2010 in Los Angeles, California. Shot entirely in black and white, it shows the band dressed in winter clothes, singing to camera in a deserted bar and on Venice Beach at sunset. Individual teasers of the video were released over a week on the band's YouTube channel in late September 2010, before the full video was premiered on the Friday, coinciding with their announcement that the song would be released for Children In Need on BBC Radio 1's The Chris Moyles Show, where the song received its first ever radio play.

== Promotion ==
JLS performed the song live for the first time on BBC Radio 2, during a special edition of "Weekend Wogan" on 3 October 2010. The band's first televised performance of the song was on 14 November 2010, on the Sunday-night results show of The X Factor. The band appeared on Daybreak on 19 November 2010, and performed the song at the Children in Need telethon on the same day, where Jonathan 'JB' Gill of the group played the piano for the performance of the song. The song was also performed on that year's Christmas Day edition of Top of the Pops, T4 Stars of 2010, BBC Switch Live 2010, Loose Women and This Morning.

== Reception ==
Robert Copsey, of entertainment website Digital Spy, gave the single four out of five stars, and had this to say about the track: "We've always considered JLS a kind of anti-boyband – because not only do they favour releasing mid-to-uptempo singles, but every member can sing, dance and pass the Louis Walsh likability test. Now, after releasing the Marmitiest single of 2010, they're finally having a bash at the old boyband ballad... but could this be the undoing of all their good work? Remember, this is JLS we're talking about. 'Love You More' may be the chalk to 'The Club Is Alive's' cheese – a soulful slowie with no Auto-Tune – but they carry it off with enough swagger and sincerity to avoid slipping into cliché. Backed by a Stargate-style guitar riff, their vocals are heartfelt, the chorus is catchier than a winter bug and there's enough charm here to remind us why they almost won The X Factor back in the day. Speaking of which, this should make for a lovely return performance, don't you reckon?"

== Chart performance ==
On 21 November 2010, "Love You More" debuted at number one on the UK Singles Chart, beating the second week sales of "The Flood" by Take That and "Your Song" by Ellie Goulding, and giving the band their fourth UK number-one single.

== Track listing ==
1. "Love You More" – 3:48
2. "You Got My Love" – 3:38

== Charts ==
=== Weekly charts ===
Chart (2010)	Peak position
Europe (European Hot 100 Singles)	7
Ireland (IRMA)	12
Scotland Singles (OCC)	1
UK Singles (OCC)	1
UK Airplay (Music Week)	1

=== Year-end charts ===
Chart (2010)	Position
UK Singles (OCC)	66
UK Airplay (Music Week)	54

== Certifications ==
Region	Certification	Certified units/sales
United Kingdom (BPI)	Gold	400,000^{‡}
^{‡} Sales+streaming figures based on certification alone.

== Release history ==
Region	Date	Format	Label	Ref.
United Kingdom	12 November 2010	Digital download	Epic	
United Kingdom	15 November 2010	CD single	Epic	

== See also ==
- List of number-one singles from the 2010s (UK)
- List of number-one singles from the 2010s (Scotland)
