= Evolution (JLS album) =

Studio album by JLS
- Released: 5 November 2012
- Genre: Pop; new jack swing; R&B
- Label: RCA
- Producer: Jon-David Anderson; Bangladesh; Jim Beanz; Darkchild; Deekay; Hollywood Hotsauce; Midi Mafia; Jarrad Rogers; James Reynolds; The Runners; Harmony Samuels; TMS

JLS chronology
Jukebox (2011)	Evolution (2012)	Goodbye – The Greatest Hits (2013)

Singles from Evolution
- 1. "Hottest Girl in the World" Released: 21 October 2012; 2. "Hold Me Down" Released: 17 December 2012

Evolution is the fourth studio album by British boy band JLS. It was released on 5 November 2012 through RCA Records. The album marks a new change in direction for the band, described as "a throwback to the '90s new jack swing/R&B-influenced music". The album was preceded by the single "Hottest Girl in the World", released on 21 October 2012.

== Background ==
In March 2012, Oritsé Williams revealed that JLS had decided to work with top American producers for their fourth record, so they can give their fans a "great album". He claimed that "We're furthering our sound in that way." "We've been in the studio with people like Darkchild, and we've kind of gone back to new jack swing, and R&B on the album." He also revealed that they were working with "Mr. Bangladesh, who is known for his hip hop. We wanted to write with new people. We've got to give the fans a great album and we try to be the best we can." In April 2012, the band revealed that they were "going to Scandinavia and America over the next few weeks to put pen to paper." They also announced that the goal with the album was "to take us international."

In August 2012, the group revealed that the album would be titled Evolution, and would be released on 5 November 2012. Humes later stated the thinking behind the title was based on the fact that the group "wanted to come back with something that was different and that would give people something to talk about". On 3 September 2012, they announced that "Hottest Girl in the World" would serve as the lead single from the album, with a release date of 21 October 2012. On 21 August, the band began filming a music video for "Hottest Girl in the World". On the direction of the album. Aston Merrygold said; "We didn't go by any kind of guidelines or anything like that, we just made what felt right and we're really excited about it." On 11 September, the band unveiled the artwork for the album. The band also confirmed that a deluxe version of the album will be available, that will feature bonus and previously unreleased tracks. On 6 September, "Hottest Girl in the World" premiered on BBC Radio 1. The album features collaborations with both Bebe O'Hare and Tiffany Foxx, two independent artists who are well known on the underground circuit in the United States. Humes said of Tiffany Foxx's appearance: "Tiffany helped us with a spectacular take of Dessert. She cracked the vocals. We would love to see the version with her released as a single." In promotion of the album, the band performed "Hottest Girl in the World" on The X Factor on 21 October 2012, and premiered "Hold Me Down" on the edition of The Xtra Factor that followed. They also performed the track on Alan Carr: Chatty Man on 26 October 2012.

== Critical reception ==
Professional ratings
Aggregate scores
Source	Rating
AnyDecentMusic?	5.6/10
Metacritic	54/100
Review scores
Source	Rating
AllMusic	2.5/5 stars
The Arts Desk	3/5 stars
Daily Express	3/5 stars
Digital Spy	3/5 stars
The Guardian	3/5 stars
The Independent	2/5 stars
The Independent on Sunday	3/5 stars
musicOMH	3/5 stars
The Press	4/5 stars
Sugarscape	10/10

Upon release, Evolution received mixed to positive reviews from music critics. At review aggregate site Metacritic, it has an average score of 54 out of 100, based on five reviews, indicating "mixed to average" reviews. Kate Lucey of Sugarscape believed that JLS had "upped their game for Evolution; released R&B, urban flavoured pop, and mastered it." She called it "their best record yet" and gave it a perfect 10/10 rating. Writing for 4Music, Chris Younie was highly positive in his review. He noted that "we've always known [JLS] were suave and sophisticated, but this has never been more evident than on this latest album. The boys are back and they're cooler, crisper and cleverer than ever before. We approve." musicOMH's Philip Matusavage remarked that the album was "never less than effective and its high-points are more interesting and persuasive than most of JLS' peers. On that basis alone, the album is a success; which suggests JLS more than deserve the international success they so obviously crave."

Rebecca Nicholson, writing for The Guardian, found that Evolution was "full of taut, sophisticated pop that nods to Justin Timberlake circa 2002, Timbaland circa 1999 and even some of Nicki Minaj's more experimental beats. The big-name producers here, from Bangladesh to Rodney Jerkins, have worked their magic [...] showing real ingenuity. In fact, the only drawback is its dreadful lyrics." Independent critic Andy Gill felt that with "Evolution, JLS shift gear and attempt to graduate from boy-band to grown-up R&B combo. But it's a tough old world out there, and they may have sacrificed the very charm that was their major selling point." Gill's colleague Kate Wills, wrote that the album was "slicker than Aston's waxed chest. Having roped in big US names such as Rodney Jerkins, Evolution is a perfect Frankenstorm of over-produced American R&B."

In a review for AllMusic, Matt Collar called Evolution a "synth-heavy album that evinces a kind of updated take on the '90s new jack swing influence that first inspired the group," while Simon Gage, writing for The Daily Express noted "a very urban American sound: slick, tight and a bit generic." The Arts Desk critic Lisa-Marie Ferla remarked that JLS had "left pop territory behind in favour of a slicker, more R&B sound." In her lukewarm review, she wrote that "there's so much going on here that listening with untrained ears is exhausting." Lewis Corner of Digital Spy rated the album three out of five stars. Regarding "Hottest Girl in the World", he said: "It was a relief to hear the group ditch their tired R&B-dance hybrids to serve up a cool slice of Justin Timberlake-styled pop. Their new attitude showed everyone that JLS are not shy about shaking off their boyish charm and transform into a charismatic manband." Corner was critical of other tracks "I Like It" and "Gotta Try It", but admitted that "nevertheless, the result is an improvement on 2011's Jukebox and proves that JLS still have some mileage in them yet."

== Track listing ==
Evolution track listing
No.	Title	Writer(s)	Producer(s)	Length
1.	"Dessert"	Aston Merrygold; Marvin Humes; Oritse Williams; JB Gill; Shondrae Crawford; Dwayne Abernathy; Sean Fenton; Keith Sweat; Roy Murray	Mr. Bangladesh; Dem Jointz^{[a]}	3:35
2.	"Hottest Girl in the World"	Merrygold; Humes; Williams; Gill; Abernathy; Ali Tennant	Mr. Bangladesh; Dem Jointz^{[a]}; James Reynolds^{[b]}; MNEK^{[b]}	3:37
3.	"Have Your Way"	Merrygold; Humes; Williams; Gill; Andrew Harr; Jermaine Jackson; Kevin "KC" Cossom; Jon-David Anderson; David Anderson	The Runners; Jon-David Anderson; David Anderson	3:30
4.	"Hold Me Down"	Merrygold; Humes; Williams; Gill; Rodney Jerkins; Wayne Hector; Eric Bellinger	Darkchild; Hollywood Hotsauce^{[a]}	3:30
5.	"I Like It"	Merrygold; Humes; Williams; Gill; Andreas Romdhane; Josef Larossi; Ina Wroldsen	TMS	3:40
6.	"All The Way"	Merrygold; Humes; Williams; Gill; Crawford; Abernathy; Armando Buelna; Mark Guinto; Rose Benson; William Reyes	Mr. Bangladesh	4:24
7.	"Give Me Life"	Merrygold; Humes; Williams; Gill; Jarrad Rogers; Emmanuel Orelaja; Jay Warner	Jarrad Rogers	3:07
8.	"Don't Know That"	Merrygold; Humes; Williams; Gill; Jerkins; Hector	Darkchild; Hollywood Hotsauce^{[a]}	3:56
9.	"Troublemaker" (featuring Bebe O'Hare)	Tennant; Peter Gordeno; Mike "Scribz" Riley; Brittany Davis	Midi Mafia; James F. Reynolds	2:58
10.	"Gotta Try It"	Merrygold; Humes; Williams; Gill; Crawford; Abernathy	Mr. Bangladesh; Dem Jointz^{[a]}	3:50
11.	"Homeless Heart"	Merrygold; Humes; Williams; Gill; Tennant; Tim McEwan	Deekay	3:58
12.	"Heartrock"	Merrygold; Humes; Williams; Gill; Lars Halvor Jensen	Deekay	3:05
13.	"Single No More"	Merrygold; Humes; Williams; Gill; Jensen; Tennant; Johannes Jørgensen	Deekay	4:06
14.	"Talk It Out"	Merrygold; Humes; Williams; Gill; Bellinger; Erika Nuri; Harmony Samuels	Samuels	3:43

Deluxe edition bonus tracks
No.	Title	Writer(s)	Producer(s)	Length
15.	"Hottest Girl in the World" (Wideboys Remix)	Merrygold; Humes; Williams; Gill; Abernathy; Tennant	Mr. Bangladesh; Dem Jointz^{[a]}; James Reynolds^{[b]}; MNEK^{[b]}; The Wideboys^{[b]}	5:08
16.	"Dessert" (featuring Tiffany Foxx)	JLS; Crawford; Abernathy; Fenton	Mr. Bangladesh; Dem Jointz^{[a]}	4:18

Notes

- ^{^[a]} signifies co-producer(s)
- ^{^[b]} signifies additional producer(s)

Sample credits

- "Dessert" contains an interpolation of "Freak Me" as performed by Silk.

== Charts ==
=== Weekly charts ===
Weekly chart performance for Evolution
Chart (2012)	Peak position
Irish Albums (IRMA)	7
Scottish Albums (Official Charts)	5
UK Albums (Official Charts)	3
UK R&B Albums (Official Charts)	1

=== Year-end charts ===
Year-end chart performance for Evolution
Chart (2012)	Position
UK Albums (OCC)	84

== Certifications ==
Certifications for Evolution
Region	Certification	Certified units/sales
United Kingdom (BPI)	Gold	100,000^{*}
^{*} Sales figures based on certification alone.

== Release history ==
Evolution release history
Country	Date	Format	Label
Ireland	3 November 2012	CD; digital download	RCA Records; Sony Music
United Kingdom	5 November 2012	CD; digital download	RCA Records; Sony Music
