= She Makes Me Wanna =

2011 single by JLS

Single by JLS featuring Dev

from the album Jukebox
- B-side: "Nobody Knows"
- Released: 24 July 2011
- Recorded: 2011
- Genre: Dance-pop
- Length: 3:39
- Label: Epic
- Songwriters: JLS; BeatGeek; Jimmy Joker; Teddy Sky
- Producers: BeatGeek; RedOne; Jimmy Joker; Teddy Sky

JLS singles chronology
"Eyes Wide Shut" (2011)	"She Makes Me Wanna" (2011)	"Take a Chance on Me" (2011)

Dev singles chronology
"In the Dark" (2011)	"She Makes Me Wanna" (2011)	"Hey Hey Hey (Pop Another Bottle)" (2011)

"She Makes Me Wanna" is a single by British boyband JLS, from their third studio album Jukebox (2011). The song was released as the album's lead single on 22 July 2011 by Epic Records. It features vocals from American singer Dev. The song was written by JLS, BeatGeek, Jimmy Joker, and Teddy Sky, and produced by BeatGeek, Jimmy Joker, Teddy Sky and RedOne. JLS said that they hoped the song would bring them "international success".

The song came about as a direct result of a charity event the band had attended held by Alicia Keys in London over a year prior, in May 2010, called The Black Ball. In a fundraising auction to win a recording session with Swizz Beatz and RedOne, the band bid £30,000 and won, beating bids from Tinchy Stryder and footballer Carlton Cole.

"She Makes Me Wanna" entered at the top of the UK Singles Chart with first-week sales of 98,000, becoming JLS's fifth number one on the chart and Dev's third top ten, and first number one, on the chart. The song was also nominated for 'Best British Single' at the 2012 BRIT Awards but lost to "What Makes You Beautiful" by One Direction. The song's accompanying music video features JLS and Dev performing at a beach party.

== Music video ==
A music video to accompany the release of "She Makes Me Wanna" was first released onto YouTube on 5 July 2011 at a total length of 3 minutes and 39 seconds. As of March 2013, it has received over 15 million hits. It was shot in Miami, Florida in May 2011, and was directed by Colin Tilley. It shows JLS and Dev performing on a purpose-built stage at a beach party, and is interspersed with individual shots of the band on some rocks and at night.

== Reception ==
=== Critical reception ===
Lewis Corner of Digital Spy gave the song a positive review stating:

"Direct me to the floor/ And turn it up some more", demands Aston over RedOne's familiar ensemble of Euro-dance synths and beach club beats - the result more juicy and colourful than a strawberry-flavoured Calippo. What's more, with a J.Lo-branded "L.A to Afreeka" section and cooler than fridge-chilled cucumbers breakdown courtesy of Dev, the boys should have no problem carrying on another yearly tradition of theirs; a chart-topping summer smash.

=== Controversy ===
JLS were accused of plagiarising Jennifer Lopez's "On the Floor", a claim they strongly denied.

== Promotion ==
JLS's first televised performance of the song was originally due to be at the annual T4 on the Beach festival in Weston-super-Mare on 10 July 2011, where they were on the bill, however owing to not being allocated enough time to do a proper soundcheck for the event they were forced to pull out at the last minute. The first televised performance was then instead on 23 July 2011, on Lee Mack's All Star Cast. They have also performed the song on This Morning, Daybreak and OK! TV. They also performed the song with fellow boy band One Direction at that year's final of The X Factor on 10 December 2011, where it was performed as a mashup with One Direction's own number-one single "What Makes You Beautiful", and on the New Year's Eve special of Alan Carr: Chatty Man. The song contributed to JLS's medley whilst singing at the Diamond Jubilee Concert on 4 June 2012, outside of Buckingham Palace.

== Track listing ==
- Digital download
1. "She Makes Me Wanna" (featuring Dev) – 3:39
2. "Nobody Knows" – 3:21
- CD single
1. "She Makes Me Wanna" (featuring Dev) – 3:39
2. "She Makes Me Wanna" (featuring Dev) (Karaoke Version) – 3:38

== Charts ==
Chart (2011)	Peak position
Ireland (IRMA)	2
Scotland Singles (OCC)	1
UK Singles (OCC)	1
UK Airplay (Music Week)	1
UK Hip Hop/R&B (OCC)	1
US Dance Club Songs (Billboard)	25

=== Year-end charts ===
Chart (2011)	position
UK Singles (Official Charts Company)	53
UK Airplay (Music Week)	32

== Certifications ==
Region	Certification	Certified units/sales
United Kingdom (BPI)	Platinum	600,000^{‡}
^{‡} Sales+streaming figures based on certification alone.

== Release history ==
Country	Release date	Format
United Kingdom	22 July 2011	Digital download
United Kingdom	25 July 2011	CD single
