= Hottest Girl in the World =

2012 single by JLS

Single by JLS

from the album Evolution
- Released: 21 October 2012
- Recorded: 2012
- Genre: R&B
- Length: 3:38
- Label: Epic
- Songwriters: Dwayne Abernathy; Shondrae Crawford; Jonathan Gill; Marvin Humes; Aston Merrygold; Oritsé Williams; Ali Tennant
- Producer: Bangladesh

JLS singles chronology
"Proud" (2012)	"Hottest Girl in the World" (2012)	"Hold Me Down" (2012)

Music video
- "Hottest Girl in the World " on YouTube

"Hottest Girl in the World" is a song by English boy band JLS, released as the official lead, and second overall, single from the group's fourth studio album, Evolution. The track was released on 21 October 2012. The track is a preview of the band's new-style material, which focuses on stronger harmonies and stripped back British R&B. The song was written by the band, along with Dwayne Abernathy, Ali Tennant and Bangladesh, the latter of whom produced the track.

== Background ==
The track received its official radio premiere was on The Chris Moyles Show on BBC Radio 1 on 6 September 2012. Shortly after, the band's official YouTube account uploaded a short audio snippet of the track, followed by an unofficial lyric video.

== Live performances ==
JLS performed the song live on The X Factor on 21 October 2012, as well as Alan Carr: Chatty Man on 26 October 2012.

== Critical reception ==
Jon Stickler of Stereoboard.com described the song as "a sleek, modern club song, showing maturity and progression, which takes the group out of pop territory."

== Music video ==
The music video for the track premiered on JLS's official YouTube account on 10 September 2012. The video features the band dressed in black and white outfits, performing choreographed routines throughout the video, alongside backing dancers.

== Track listing ==
- Digital download
1. "Hottest Girl in the World" - 3:39
2. "Hottest Girl in the World" (Andi Durrant & Steve More Radio Edit) - 4:08
3. "Hottest Girl in the World" (Bless Beats Remix) [featuring Dominique Young Unique] - 4:02
4. "Hottest Girl in the World" (DJ Fricktion Remix) - 3:57
- CD single
1. "Hottest Girl in the World" - 3:39
2. "Hottest Girl in the World" (Andi Durrant & Steve More Radio Edit) - 4:08

== Charts ==
=== Weekly charts ===
Chart (2012)	Peak position
Ireland (IRMA)	22
Scottish Singles Sales (Official Charts)	9
Slovakia Airplay (ČNS IFPI)	39
UK Singles (Official Charts)	6
UK Airplay (Music Week)	9
UK Hip Hop/R&B (Official Charts)	3

=== Year-end charts ===
Chart (2012)	Position
UK Singles (OCC)	198
