= The Club Is Alive =

2010 single by JLS

Single by JLS

from the album Outta This World and JLS (U.S. version)
- B-side: "Only Tonight" (remix)
- Released: 2 July 2010
- Recorded: 2010
- Genre: Dance-pop; R&B
- Length: 3:36
- Label: Epic
- Songwriters: Richard Rodgers; Oscar Hammerstein II; Andrew Frampton; Savan Kotecha; Steve Mac
- Producer: Steve Mac

JLS singles chronology
"One Shot" (2010)	"The Club Is Alive" (2010)	"Love You More" (2010)

"The Club Is Alive" is a song by British boy band JLS. It was released in the United Kingdom on 2 July 2010 as the lead single from their second studio album, Outta This World. It was also included in the American EP version of their debut album.

== Background ==
Its lyrics sample "The Sound of Music", composed by Richard Rodgers, to lyrics by Oscar Hammerstein II and originally performed by Mary Martin in the stage musical of the same name, but was later popularised by Julie Andrews in the 1965 film. It was written by Andrew Frampton, Savan Kotecha and Steve Mac and produced by Mac. Inspired by the musical film The Sound of Music, the song was originally intended for American rapper Flo Rida, but he declined.

== Critical reception ==
Robert Copsey of Digital Spy gave the song a positive review stating that JLS had "managed to successfully step outside their comfort zone", giving the song four out of five stars.

== Music video ==
The video for the single was shot in May 2010 during the band's visit to Los Angeles, California, while recording their second album. Directed by Frank Borin, it takes its inspiration from the popular US TV series Entourage. The video shows the band turn up to a party in a nightclub in downtown L.A., where they also perform their song on a revolving stage.

== Promotion ==
JLS performed the song on the fifth live semi-final of series 4 of Britain's Got Talent. On 11 July 2010, JLS performed the song on Alan Carr: Chatty Man and also gave an interview. The song was also performed at the Radio 1's Big Weekend in Bangor, Wales and T4 on the Beach, as well as on GMTV, Magic Numbers, T4 Stars of 2010 and The 5.19 Show.

== Chart performance ==
"The Club Is Alive" debuted on the Irish Singles Chart on 9 July 2010 at number four where it remained for two consecutive weeks, marking the band's third top five hit in the country. On 11 July 2010, the song debuted on the UK Singles Chart at number one. It became their third number one single, selling 84,283 copies in its first week. Despite the initial success of the song, it dropped six places to number seven the following week and then a further two places to number nine on 25 July 2010. On 1 August 2010, the song dropped a further seven places to number sixteen.

== Track listing ==
1. "The Club Is Alive" – 3:36
2. "Only Tonight" (Remix featuring Chipmunk) – 3:42

Wideboys Remix

1. "The Club Is Alive" (Wideboys Stadium Mix - Radio Edit) – 3:19

== Charts ==
=== Weekly charts ===
Chart (2010)	Peak position
Europe (European Hot 100 Singles)	8
Ireland (IRMA)	4
Scottish Singles Sales (Official Charts)	1
UK Singles (Official Charts)	1
UK Airplay (Music Week)	6

=== Year-end charts ===
Chart (2010)	Position
UK Singles (OCC)	87

== Certifications ==
Region	Certification	Certified units/sales
United Kingdom (BPI)	Gold	400,000^{‡}
^{‡} Sales+streaming figures based on certification alone.

== Release history ==
Region	Date	Label	Format
United Kingdom	2 July 2010	Epic Records	Digital download
United Kingdom	5 July 2010	Epic Records	CD single
Sony Indonesian-International	11 July 2010	Sony Music Entertainment	Digital download

== See also ==
- List of UK Singles Chart number ones of the 2010s
- List of UK R&B Singles Chart number ones of 2010
