= Jukebox (JLS album) =

Studio album by JLS
- Released: 14 November 2011
- Recorded: April–June 2011
- Genre: Electro-R&B
- Length: 43:21
- Labels: Epic; Sony
- Producers: BeatGeek; Jimmy Joker; Teddy Sky; RedOne; Julian Bunetta; Chris Braide; Cutfather; Harmony Samuels; Jason Gill; Daniel Davidsen; Damon Sharpe; Fred Ball; Andrew Frampton; Patrick Jordan-Patrikios

JLS chronology
Outta This World (2010)	Jukebox (2011)	Evolution (2012)

Singles from Jukebox
- 1. "She Makes Me Wanna" Released: 22 July 2011; 2. "Take a Chance on Me" Released: 4 November 2011; 3. "Do You Feel What I Feel?" Released: 1 January 2012

Jukebox is the third studio album by English boy band JLS, released on 11 November 2011 through Epic Records. The album's release was preceded by the lead single "She Makes Me Wanna", which debuted at number one on the UK Singles Chart in July 2011, and the second single, "Take a Chance on Me", released on 4 November 2011. The single charted at number two in the British charts. The album was issued in four exclusive different editions through music retailer HMV, each containing a slipcase portraying a different member of the band on the artwork.

== Background ==
The band began recording their third studio album in April 2011, and stated that they had co-written 16 tracks that could possibly appear. In June 2011, the band announced that they had finished recording the album, and that out of a possible 30 songs, had to decide which tracks would appear on the album. The band stated at the time that they had been recording collaborations with Bruno Mars, Rihanna, Usher and Craig David - however, none of these appear on the album. The album's lead single, "She Makes Me Wanna", a collaboration with American singer Dev, was released on 24 July 2011, peaking at #1 on the UK Singles Chart and de-throning fellow boyband The Wanted's second number one single, "Glad You Came". The album's second single, "Take A Chance On Me", was premiered on 20 September, with band member Oritse commenting, "It's the most personal song we've ever done." The group will tour the United Kingdom in 2012 promoting the album, with more than 20 dates confirmed for their 4th Dimension Tour, due to start in March 2012.

== Singles ==
- "She Makes Me Wanna" was released on 25 July 2011 as the lead single from the album. The single debuted at number one on the UK Singles Chart, with first-week sales of 98,000 copies. In Ireland, the song peaked at number two.
- "Take a Chance on Me" was released on 6 November 2011, as the second single from the album. It debuted at number two on the UK Singles Chart selling over 62,000 in its first week, making it JLS's eighth top-ten single. In Ireland, the song peaked at number 13.
- "Do You Feel What I Feel?" was released on 1 January 2012, as the third single from the album. The song samples Bing Crosby's classic festive hit "Do You Hear What I Hear?". The single only managed to peak at number 16 on the UK Singles Chart making it their lowest peaking single at the time. However the music video won Best Video at the MOBO Awards 2012.

== Critical reception ==
Professional ratings
Review scores
Source	Rating
AllMusic	2.5/5 stars
Daily Express	3/5 stars
Digital Spy	3/5 stars
Evening Standard	2/5 stars
The Guardian	3/5 stars
The Independent	3/5 stars
Metro	2/5 stars
The Observer	2/5 stars
Virgin Media	3/5 stars

Jukebox received mixed reviews from music critics. The Guardian's Caroline Sullivan felt that Jukebox "sticks to the urban-pop recipe that has netted them five number one singles in two years. A couple of songs do diverge from the synths-and-gloss formula [...] This jukebox needs restocking – next time, how about something that makes more play of their Britishness?" Andy Gill from The Independent wrote that "though titled Jukebox to reflect the supposed range of different styles involved, this third JLS album actually sounds more homogenised than last year's "Outta This World", with a wearying proliferation of standard synth-stab dancefloor pulses rendering the bulk of these songs musically undistinguished. But there are some pleasing moments here." AllMusic editor Jon O'Brien commented on the album: "With their younger counterparts breathing new life into the boy band market, JLS are going to have to start raising their game to compete, but the fact that you know exactly what Jukebox is going to sound like before you hear it means it remains to be seen whether they are capable of doing so."

Lewis Corner of Digital Spy gave the album three out of five stars, stating: "Unfortunately, the final result is much the same; while the record has its full-marks pop ditties, the majority leaves you feeling that JLS could have put in a little extra revision time." Daily Express remarked that the song on Jukebox "are undoubtedly quite high quality even if they are a little "by numbers"." BBC Music editor Nick Levine found that "it's pretty appropriate that they've called this third album Jukebox, because the songs here invariably recall recent electro-RnB hits from their chart contemporaries: Taio Cruz, Chris Brown, Usher, even Britney Spears. You know the drill by now: there's a generous sprinkling of European cheese on the club bangers; the mid-tempo cuts come complete with "Umbrella"-style vocal hooks; and the lyrics offer coruscating observations about boys and girls on the floor, hands in the air, and drinks, um, in the cups." Metro found that Jukebox "never stretches beyond JLS's excitable young fanbase, and unfortunately the album feels a bit one-track," while David Smyth, writing for The Evening Standard, described the album as "all-gloss pop for short attention spans." He concluded: "It's all over quickly, at least."

== Track listings ==
Jukebox track listing
No.	Title	Writer(s)	Producer(s)	Length
1.	"She Makes Me Wanna" (featuring Dev)	Aston Merrygold; Marvin Humes; Oritse Williams; JB Gill; BeatGeek; Jimmy Joker; Teddy Sky	RedOne; BeatGeek; Joker; Sky	3:39
2.	"Do You Feel What I Feel?"	Gloria Shayne Baker; Tebey Ottoh; Julian Bunetta; Noël Regney; John Ryan	Julian Bunetta	3:13
3.	"Teach Me How to Dance"	Merrygold; Humes; Williams; Gill; BeatGeek; Joker; Sky	BeatGeek; Joker; Sky	3:29
4.	"Take a Chance on Me"	Emile Ghantous; Frankie Bautista; Nasri Atweh; Nick Turpin	Chris Braide	3:35
5.	"Go Harder"	Merrygold; Humes; Williams; Gill; Daniel Davidsen; Jason Gill; Mich Hansen; Ali Tennant	Cutfather; Jason Gill	3:20
6.	"So Many Girls"	Merrygold; Humes; Williams; Gill; Harmony Samuels; Eric Bellinger; Erika Nuri	Harmony "H-Money" Samuels	3:22
7.	"3D"	Merrygold; Humes; Williams; Gill; Davidsen; Gill; Hansen; Damon Sharpe	Cutfather; Jason Gill; Damon Sharpe	4:08
8.	"Take You Down"	Merrygold; Humes; Williams; Gill; Davidsen; Gill; Tennant; Talay Riley	Cutfather; Jason Gill	4:01
9.	"Innocence"	Merrygold; Humes; Williams; Gill; Fred Ball; Teemu Brunila	Fred Ball	3:15
10.	"Killed By Love"	Merrygold; Humes; Williams; Gill; Braide	Chris Braide	3:43
11.	"Never Gonna Stop"	Merrygold; Humes; Williams; Gill; Abeeku Ribeiro; Andrew Frampton; Patrick Jordan-Patrikios	Andrew Frampton; Patrick Jordan-Patrikios	3:14
12.	"Shy of the Cool"	Merrygold; Humes; Williams; Gill	Fred Ball	4:23
Total length:				43:21

iTunes Store bonus track
No.	Title	Writer(s)	Producer(s)	Length
13.	"One Shot" (Live at the O2)	Carsten Schack; Kenneth Karlin; Michael Warren; Brandon White; Sean Hurley	Soulshock & Karlin	3:53

Sample credits

- "Do You Feel What I Feel?" incorporates elements of "Do You Hear What I Hear?" written by Gloria Shayne Baker and Tebey Ottoh.

== Charts ==
=== Weekly charts ===
Weekly chart performance for Jukebox
Chart (2011)	Peak position
Irish Albums (IRMA)	5
Scottish Albums (Official Charts)	4
UK Albums (Official Charts)	2

=== Year-end charts ===
2011 year-end chart performance for Jukebox
Chart (2011)	Position
UK Albums (OCC)	29

2012 year-end chart performance for Jukebox
Chart (2012)	Position
UK Albums (OCC)	150

== Certifications ==
Certifications for Jukebox
Region	Certification	Certified units/sales
Ireland (IRMA)	Gold	7,500^{^}
United Kingdom (BPI)	Platinum	300,000^{^}
^{^} Shipments figures based on certification alone.

== Release history ==
Jukebox release history
Region	Date	Format	Label	Ref(s)
Ireland	11 November 2011	CD; digital download	Epic Records; Sony Music	
United Kingdom	14 November 2011	CD; digital download	Epic Records; Sony Music	
