= Sandwich Technology School =

Location
- Deal Road; Sandwich, Kent, CT13 0FA; England; 51°15′51″N 1°20′08″E

Information
- Type: Academy
- Motto: Hold fast that which is good.
- Established: 1935
- Local authority: Kent County Council
- Specialist: Technology
- Department for Education URN: 136317 Tables
- Ofsted: Reports
- Headmaster: Simon Sharples
- Gender: Coeducational
- Age: 11 to 19
- Enrolment: 1435
- Houses: Fisher, Guildhall, Strand, Quay
- Colours: Green, Red, Yellow and Blue
- Website: http://www.sandwich-tech.kent.sch.uk

Sandwich Technology School is a secondary school with academy status in Sandwich, Kent, England. The school motto is 'Hold fast that which is good'. This school was rated by Ofsted as Inadequate and placed in Special Measures in September 2024.
