= Outta This World =

Studio album by JLS
- Released: 19 November 2010
- Genres: Pop; dance-pop; R&B
- Length: 48:07
- Label: Epic
- Producers: Steve Mac; DEEKAY; Stargate; J-Remy; BobbyBass; Jerry Wonda; Toby Gad; Metrophonic; Lucas Secon; Chris Braide; Fred Ball

JLS chronology
JLS (2009)	Outta This World (2010)	Jukebox (2011)

Singles from Outta This World
- 1. "The Club Is Alive" Released: 2 July 2010; 2. "Love You More" Released: 15 November 2010; 3. "Eyes Wide Shut" Released: 13 February 2011

Outta This World is the second studio album from English boy band and The X Factor runners-up JLS. It was released in Ireland on 19 November 2010 and in the United Kingdom on 22 November 2010. The album received negative to mixed reviews from music critics. It debuted at number two in the UK, and at number four in Ireland, selling 152,000 copies in its first week in the UK. Since its release, the album has sold over 650,000 copies.

== Background ==
In an interview with website Digital Spy, band member Oritsé Williams discussed the album, saying, "Despite writing the album in the US, we believe it has a UK sound with the JLS stamp on it. The sound is a progression from the last album though. We've taken risks exploring house music and left-field R&B. We wanted to merge the sound and create something for everyone. I think this album will reach out to a diverse range of listeners – that's the exciting thing about this album."

== Singles ==
- "The Club Is Alive" was released on 4 July 2010, as the lead single from the album. The single debuted at number one on the UK Singles Chart, with first-week sales of 84,283 copies. In Ireland, the song peaked at number four.
- "Love You More" was released on 14 November 2010, as the second single from the album. The song also serves as the official 2010 Children in Need charity single. It debuted at number one on the UK Singles Chart, making it JLS's fourth number-one single.
- "Eyes Wide Shut" was released as the third single on 13 February 2011. The single version features British rapper Tinie Tempah. The song peaked at number eight on the UK Singles Chart, becoming the band's sixth top-ten hit.

== Critical reception ==
Professional ratings
Review scores
Source	Rating
Allmusic	2.5/5 stars
Daily Express	3/5 stars
Evening Standard	3/5 stars
The Guardian	2/5 stars
The Independent	2/5 stars
The Scotsman	3/5 stars
Virgin Media	2/5 stars
Yahoo! Music UK	7/10 stars

The album has received generally mixed reviews from music critics. In his review for The Independent, Andy Gill reviewed the album poorly and said "For most of its 14 tracks, Outta This World is boy-band R&B at its most formulaic, tracks like "That's My Girl" and over-autotuned opener "The Club Is Alive" ticking along meekly, with the boys simpering in the required manner through "Love You More", balladry so mechanical you can virtually hear the conveyor-belt trundling around" but praised "Other Side of the World" for being the band's "best collective performance" and "the most considered [...] lyric". Jaime Gill of Yahoo! Music UK called the album an "energetic and surprisingly eclectic pop record on its own terms" and "a bumpy but enjoyable ride". He praised the vocal talents and "playful pop instincts" of JLS but felt the album lacked consistency. Ian Wade of BBC Music gave the album a positive review and wrote that aside from the lead single, "The Club is Alive" the album "is a bold affirmation of JLS’s arrival as a pop force." Rick Pearson of the Evening Standard awarded the album three stars out of five commenting "Aston, Marvin, Oritsé and JB have risen from being runners-up in X Factor to being runners-up in the contest to be Britain's biggest boyband — and there's no shame in coming second to Take That [but] Outta this world? No. Slick, stylish pop music? Absolutely."

Hugh Montgomery of The Observer gave the album a negative review and said that "the boy band remains a terminally dull proposition for anyone outside the teen-girl demographic. This second album's opening tracks make a proficient shift into dance-pop, complete with hulking, superclubesque synth lines. But these attempted party-starters are stymied by over-emoting vocals and soon they fall back on a rote mix of Usher-lite R&B and cooing ballads." Virgin Media reviewed the album negatively by commenting that "As a state-of-the-art summary of exactly where X Factor-addled, clinical and cynical chart-pop is at in 2010, Outta This World is definitive and peerless. As a pop album, there is no escaping its major drawback: it is mind-numbingly boring." The Guardian's Michael Cragg gave the album two stars out of five and described it as an album that "takes few risks" and wrote, "Too often [...] Outta This World reminds you of other, far superior songs, from Work's pastiche of Rihanna's Rude Boy to the blatant lift from Calvin Harris's I'm Not Alone on Eyes Wide Shut." Daily Express reviewer Simon Gage stated "These are high-quality songs produced by the best R ’n’ B producers in the world, mixing storming dancefloor numbers with a couple of schmaltzy ballads. Slick stuff." The Scotsman gave the album three stars out of five and described the album as "corporate teen fodder at its most palatable" and concluded that the songs "all sounds shiny and the same".

== Chart performance ==
On 26 November 2010 Outta This World debuted at number four on the Irish Album Chart. On 28 November 2010 the album debuted at number two on the UK Album Chart selling 152,474 copies in its first week. The album was kept off the top spot by Take That's Progress which sold 208,000 on its second week. The album was certified Platinum in the UK on 7 January 2011.

== Track listing ==
Outta This World track listing
No.	Title	Writer(s)	Producer(s)	Length
1.	"The Club Is Alive"	Savan Kotecha; Richard Rodgers III; Andrew Frampton; Steve Mac	Mac	3:43
2.	"Eyes Wide Shut"	Aston Merrygold; Marvin Humes; Oritse Williams; JB Gill; Tim McEwan; Lars Halvor Jensen	Deekay	3:51
3.	"Outta This World"	Merrygold; Humes; Williams; Gill; August Rigo; Mikkel S. Eriksen; Tor Erik Hermansen	Stargate	3:43
4.	"That's My Girl"	Merrygold; Humes; Williams; Gill; Jay Sean; Jared Cotter; Robert Larow; Jeremy Skaller; Jonathan Perkins	J-Remy; BobbyBass	3:06
5.	"Work"	Merrygold; Humes; Williams; Gill; Rigo; Eriksen; Hermansen; Nick Brongers	Stargate	3:07
6.	"I Know What She Like"	Merrygold; Humes; Williams; Gill; Rigo; Jerry "Wonda" Duplessis; Arden Altino	Duplessis	3:16
7.	"Love You More"	Merrygold; Humes; Williams; Gill; Wayne Hector; Toby Gad	Gad	3:47
8.	"Other Side of the World"	Merrygold; Humes; Williams; Gill; Paul Barry; Alex Smith	Metrophonic	3:02
9.	"Better for You"	Merrygold; Humes; Williams; Gill; Daniel "Obi" Klein; Ali Tennant; Johannes R. Jørgensen	Deekay	3:39
10.	"Superhero"	Merrygold; Humes; Williams; Gill; McEwan; Jensen; Tennant	Deekay	3:19
11.	"Love at War"	Merrygold; Humes; Williams; Gill; Rigo; Eriksen; Hermansen	Stargate	3:34
12.	"Don't Talk About Love"	Merrygold; Humes; Williams; Gill; Tennant; Lucas Secon; Carsten Mortensen	Secon	3:17
13.	"That's Where I'm Coming From"	Merrygold; Humes; Williams; Gill; Chris Braide	Braide	3:42
14.	"The Last Song"	Merrygold; Humes; Williams; Gill; Fred Ball; Teemu Brunila	Ball	3:08
Total length:				48:07

iTunes Store bonus material
No.	Title	Length
15.	"The Club Is Alive" (video)	3:43
16.	"Love You More" (video)	3:47

== Charts ==
=== Weekly charts ===
Weekly chart performance for Outta This World
Chart (2010)	Peak position
European Albums Chart (Billboard)	10
Irish Albums (IRMA)	4
Scottish Albums (Official Charts)	3
UK Albums (Official Charts)	2

=== Year-end charts ===
2010 year-end chart performance for Outta This World
Chart (2010)	Position
UK Albums (OCC)	18

2011 year-end chart performance for Outta This World
Chart (2011)	Position
UK Albums (OCC)	75

=== Decade-end charts ===
Decade-end chart performance for Outta This World
Chart (2010–2019)	Position
UK Albums (OCC)	98

== Certifications ==
Certifications for Outta This World
Region	Certification	Certified units/sales
Ireland (IRMA)	Platinum	15,000^{^}
United Kingdom (BPI)	2× Platinum	600,000^{^}
^{^} Shipments figures based on certification alone.

== Release history ==
Outta This World release history
Region	Date	Format	Label	Catalog
Ireland	19 November 2010	CD; digital download	Epic	88697742862
United Kingdom	22 November 2010	CD; digital download	Epic	88697742862
