= Take a Chance on Me (JLS song) =

2011 single by JLS

Single by JLS

from the album Jukebox
- B-side: "Unstoppable"
- Released: 4 November 2011
- Recorded: 2011
- Genre: R&B; dance-pop
- Length: 3:35
- Label: Epic
- Songwriters: Emile Ghantous; Frankie Bautista; Nasri Atweh; Nick Turpin
- Producers: Emile Ghantous; Nasri Atweh

JLS singles chronology
"She Makes Me Wanna" (2011)	"Take a Chance on Me" (2011)	"Wishing on a Star" (2011)

Music video
- "Take a Chance on Me" on YouTube

"Take a Chance on Me" is a song by English boy band JLS from their third studio album, Jukebox. It was released as the album's second single on 4 November 2011. The ballad was written by Emile Ghantous, Frankie Bautista, Nasri Atweh and Nick Turpin, and it was produced by Nasri Atweh and Emile Ghantous. The song debuted at number two on the UK Singles Chart, selling 67,850 copies in its first week.

== Critical reception ==
Critics praised the song. Caroline Sullivan of The Guardian called it "a wet, Bruno Mars-apeing ballad saved by pretty nifty harmonies." Entertainment website 4Music described the song as "the perfect October ballad". Digital Spy's Lewis Corner gave the song three out of five stars, comparing the song to Bing Crosby recording of "Do You Hear What I Hear?" and calling it a "customary boyband composition of feather-light beats and smooth piano".

== Chart performance ==
In Ireland, the song debuted at number thirteen on the chart dated 10 November 2011. In the UK, although the song reached number one on the mid-week chart update, the song debuted at number 2, behind the sixth week sales of Rihanna's "We Found Love".

== Music video ==
A lyric video for "Take a Chance on Me" premiered on YouTube on 24 September 2011, four days after the song first premiered on radio stations across the United Kingdom.

A music video was released on 21 October 2011, featuring the members singing at London sights at night, path walk of the River Thames, the Tower Bridge and the London Eye illuminated.

== Live performances ==
The band performed the song live for the first time during the live shows of the eighth series of The X Factor.

== Track listing ==
- Digital download
1. "Take a Chance on Me" - 3:36
2. "Take a Chance on Me" (Soul Seekerz Club Mix) - 7:17
3. "Take a Chance on Me" (The Wideboys Club Mix) - 5:41
4. "Unstoppable" - 4:21
- CD single
1. "Take a Chance on Me" - 3:40
2. "Unstoppable" - 4:21

== Charts ==
=== Weekly charts ===
Chart (2011)	Peak position
Ireland (IRMA)	13
Scottish Singles Sales (Official Charts)	2
UK Singles (Official Charts)	2
UK Airplay (Music Week)	5

=== Year-end charts ===
Chart (2011)	Position
UK Singles (OCC)	147

== Certifications ==
Region	Certification	Certified units/sales
United Kingdom (BPI)	Silver	200,000^{‡}
^{‡} Sales+streaming figures based on certification alone.

== Release history ==
Country	Date	Format
Ireland	4 November 2011	Digital download
United Kingdom	6 November 2011	Digital download
United Kingdom	7 November 2011	CD single
