= JLS (album) =

Studio album by JLS
- Released: 9 November 2009
- Genre: Pop; dance; R&B
- Length: 44:47
- Label: Epic
- Producer: Wayne Hector; Steve Mac; J.R. Rotem; Fraser T Smith; Jonas Jeberg; Cutfather; Metrophonic; DEEKAY; Soulshock & Karlin

JLS chronology
| JLS (2009) | Outta This World (2010) |

Singles from JLS
- 1. "Beat Again" Released: 13 July 2009; 2. "Everybody in Love" Released: 2 November 2009; 3. "One Shot" Released: 22 February 2010

JLS is the debut studio album by British boy band JLS. It was released in the UK on 9 November 2009 by Epic Records. It was preceded by the lead single, "Beat Again" on 13 July 2009. The album debuted at number one in the UK and Ireland. It has been certified five times platinum in the UK, where it was the sixth best-selling album of 2009.

In the US, the album was issued as a six track EP featuring their three UK singles, their new single "The Club Is Alive" and two other tracks from the UK version of the album. This version was released on 2 August 2010. The album also won the award for "Best Album" at the MOBO Awards in 2010.

== Singles ==
- "Beat Again" was the debut release by the band, following their success on the fifth series of The X Factor in 2008. The song was especially successful on the UK Singles Chart, debuting at number, selling 106,299 copies in its first week. The single became the second fastest-selling single of 2009, behind "Bonkers" by Dizzee Rascal. It has sold over 500,000 copies in the UK.
- "Everybody in Love" was released as the second single from the album. On 8 November 2009, the song topped the UK Singles Chart, by selling over 121,000 copies in one week. It has sold over 400,000 copies in the UK, The single was released in February 2010 in the United States, but failed to chart.
- "One Shot" was released as the third and final single from the album on 22 February 2010. The song has peaked in the UK Singles Chart at number six. It has sold over 300,000 copies in the UK.

== Critical reception ==
Professional ratings
Aggregate scores
| Source | Rating |
|---|---|
| AnyDecentMusic? | 2.7/10 |
Review scores
| Source | Rating |
| AllMusic | 3/5 stars |
| Digital Spy | 2/5 stars |
| Entertainment.ie | 2/5 stars |
| The Guardian | 2/5 stars |
| In the News | 5/10 |
| The Scotsman | 1/5 stars |
| Virgin Media | 3/5 stars |

The album received generally negative reviews from critics on release. It scored an average of 2.7/10 at aggregator website AnyDecentMusic?, which is the lowest score in the history of the website. Entertainment.ie found that "for the most part, JLS is exactly what you'd expect from a typical four piece boyband - unashamed cheesy pop with flourishes of R&B and dance [...] For a group that proved over the course of ten X Factor live finals that they can actually sing, it's criminal how overproduced the vocals are here. Voices are either Auto Tuned beyond recognition or blended so closely together that one voice is almost totally indistinguishable from another." Digital Spy critic David Balls found that "JLS set the standard that bit higher on The X Factor with stronger-than-average vocals and an endearing camaraderie. Sadly, that excitement hasn't really been translated onto their first album. Their loyal army of fans will ensure that it sells, but there's little here to justify why they voted for them in the first place." The Guardian's Maddy Costa wrote: "The yearning, minor-chord chorus line of "Beat Again," JLS's debut single, suggests they might be worthy of attention – it's heart-snaggingly beautiful – but nothing else on the album matches it. The other 12 songs are as carefully computer-generated as the quartet's image, and correspondingly lacking in soul."

AllMusic editor Jason Birchmeier rated the album three out of five stars. He found that JLS "come up with a few standout songs on their eponymous album debut, which is otherwise rather bland. The British boy band [...] is certainly likable. They're cute and charismatic, and they sing well enough. What they lack is songwriting talent. They're credited with writing many of the songs on the album; in fact, most of the album's second half is penned by them and produced by Metrophonic. These songs aren't all that good. The highlights of JLS aren't those songs written by the bandmembers, but rather those written and produced by industry hitmakers." The Scotsman stated that the album was "not particularly inferior to Cheryl Cole's effort but it is a whole lot more disappointing for the way it sacrifices any shred of soul in favour of regulation boy-band blandness – not blandness of the Westlife blazers-and-ballads school, but of the anonymous anaemic pop R&B realm. Even when they do muster a catchy chorus, for instance on "Don't Go," the homogenous production stamps out any vestige of this likeable quartet's personality."

== Commercial performance ==
The album debuted at number one on the Irish Albums Chart on 12 November 2009. In the UK, the band beat Robbie Williams to the number-one spot on 15 November 2009. Both JLS and Williams's tenth solo album Reality Killed the Video Star sold over 200,000 copies, making them the fastest-selling albums of the year. JLS beat Williams to the top spot by a margin of less than 1% First week sales were reported to be more than 230,000 copies; it was later revealed that JLS had first-week sales of 239,643, compared to 238,126 for Reality Killed the Video Star, meaning that Williams had lost out by just 1,517 copies, or 0.64%.

The album has been certified two times platinum in Ireland, while being certified four times Platinum in the UK, and was the sixth best-selling album of 2009 in the UK. The album was also the 35th best-selling album of 2010, selling 317,000 copies of the album that year. The album has sold 1.4 million copies in total in the UK as of December 2012.

== Track listing ==
JLS track listing
| No. | Title | Writer(s) | Producer(s) | Length |
|---|---|---|---|---|
| 1. | "Beat Again" | Wayne Hector; Steve Mac | Hector; Mac | 3:19 |
| 2. | "Everybody in Love" | Hector; J.R. Rotem; Felicia Jensen; David Doman | Rotem | 3:16 |
| 3. | "Keep You" | Aston Merrygold; Marvin Humes; Oritsé Williams; JB Gill; Fraser T. Smith; Taio Cruz | Smith | 3:01 |
| 4. | "Crazy for You" | Hector; Mac | Mac | 3:37 |
| 5. | "Heal This Heartbreak" | Merrygold; Humes; Williams; Gill; Mich Hansen; Jonas Jeberg; Chris Braide | Jeberg; Cutfather | 3:45 |
| 6. | "Close to You" | Merrygold; Humes; Williams; Gill; Paul Barry; Graham Stack | Metrophonic | 3:51 |
| 7. | "Only Tonight" | Merrygold; Humes; Williams; Gill; Lars Halvor Jensen; Martin Larsson; Ali Tennant | Deekay | 3:39 |
| 8. | "One Shot" | Carsten Schack; Kenneth Karlin; Michael Warren; Brandon White; Sean Hurley | Soulshock & Karlin | 3:48 |
| 9. | "Private" | Merrygold; Humes; Williams; Gill; Ayak Thiik; Paul Meehan | Metrophonic | 3:14 |
| 10. | "Don't Go" | Merrygold; Humes; Williams; Gill; Stack; Jamie Scott | Metrophonic | 2:53 |
| 11. | "Only Making Love" | Merrygold; Humes; Williams; Gill; Meehan; Tim Woodcock | Metrophonic | 3:47 |
| 12. | "Kickstart" | Merrygold; Humes; Williams; Gill; Jensen; Larsson; Tennant | Deekay | 3:11 |
| 13. | "Tightrope" | Merrygold; Humes; Williams; Gill; Barry; Stack | Metrophonic | 3:26 |
| Total length: | | | | 44:47 |

Asda limited edition bonus DVD
| No. | Title | Length |
|---|---|---|
| 1. | "Beat Again" (Music video) | 3:19 |
| 2. | "Everybody In Love" (Music video) | 3:16 |
| 3. | "Making the album" (Interview) | 3:55 |

US Edition
| No. | Title | Writer(s) | Producer(s) | Length |
|---|---|---|---|---|
| 1. | "Beat Again" | Hector; Mac | Hector; Mac | 3:19 |
| 2. | "Everybody In Love" | Hector; Rotem; Jensen; Doman | Rotem | 3:16 |
| 3. | "The Club Is Alive" | Savan Kotecha; Richard Rodgers; Andrew Frampton; Mac | Mac | 3:43 |
| 4. | "One Shot" | Schack; Karlin; Warren; White; Hurley | Soulshock & Karlin | 3:48 |
| 5. | "Keep You" | Smith; Gill; Williams; Cruz | Smith | 3:01 |
| 6. | "Close to You" | Merrygold; Humes; Williams; Gill; Barry; Stack | Metrophonic | 3:51 |
| Total length: | | | | 20:02 |

Walmart deluxe edition bonus track
| No. | Title | Writer(s) | Producer(s) | Length |
|---|---|---|---|---|
| 7. | "Heal This Heartbreak" | Merrygold; Humes; Williams; Gill; Hansen; Jeberg; Braide | Jeberg; Cutfather | 3:45 |

== Charts ==
=== Weekly charts ===
Weekly chart performance for JLS
| Chart (2009) | Peak position |
|---|---|
| European Albums Chart (Billboard) | 8 |
| Irish Albums (IRMA) | 1 |
| Scottish Albums (OCC) | 2 |
| UK Albums (OCC) | 2 |
| UK R&B Albums (OCC) | 1 |

=== Year-end charts ===
2009 year-end chart performance for JLS
| Chart (2009) | Position |
|---|---|
| Irish Albums (IRMA) | 13 |
| UK Albums (OCC) | 6 |

2010 year-end chart performance for JLS
| Chart (2010) | Position |
|---|---|
| UK Albums (OCC) | 33 |

== Certifications ==
Certifications for JLS
| Region | Certification | Certified units/sales |
|---|---|---|
| Ireland (IRMA) | 2× Platinum | 30,000^{^} |
| United Kingdom (BPI) | 5× Platinum | 1,500,000^{‡} |
Summaries
| Europe (IFPI) | Platinum | 1,000,000^{*} |
^{*} Sales figures based on certification alone.^{^} Shipments figures based on certification alone.^{‡} Sales+streaming figures based on certification alone.

== Release history ==
JLS release history
| Region | Date | Format | Label | Ref. |
|---|---|---|---|---|
| United Kingdom | 9 November 2009 | CD; DVD; digital download | Epic Records | |
| United States | 3 August 2010 | CD; digital download | Jive Records | |
