= MKM Stadium =

Sports stadium in Kingston upon Hull, England

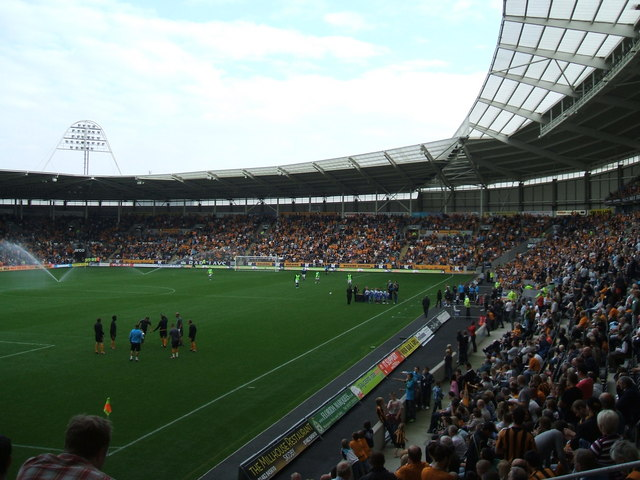
- Interactive map of MKM Stadium
- Former names: KC Stadium (2002–2016); KCOM Stadium (2016–2021)
- Location: The Circle, Walton Street, Anlaby Road, Hull, East Riding of Yorkshire, England, HU3 6HU
- Coordinates: 53°44′46″N 0°22′4″W
- Owner: Hull City Council
- Operator: Stadium Management Company (SMC)
- Capacity: 24,983
- Surface: Desso GrassMaster
- Record attendance: 25,280 (England U-21 vs. Netherlands U-21, 17 February 2004)

Construction
- Groundbreaking: October 2001
- Opened: December 2002
- Cost: £44 million
- Architect: The Miller Partnership

Tenants
- Hull City A.F.C. (2002–present); Hull F.C. (2003–present)

The MKM Stadium is a multi-purpose stadium in Kingston upon Hull, England. It has a current capacity of 24,983. The stadium is home to both association football club Hull City A.F.C. of the Premier League and rugby league club Hull F.C. of the Super League.

It was previously known as the KC Stadium, but was renamed the KCOM Stadium as part of a major rebrand on 4 April 2016 by the stadium's sponsor KCOM. In June 2021, it was renamed to its current name, the MKM Stadium, as part of a five-year sponsorship with MKM Building Supplies. During UEFA competitions, the stadium is known as the Hull City Stadium due to sponsorship regulations.

Conceived in the late 1990s, it was completed in 2002 at a cost of approximately £44 million. The stadium is owned by Hull City Council and operated by the Stadium Management Company (SMC), who have previously considered expanding the stadium capacity up to 34,000. The bowl-shaped stadium contains a continuous single tier of seats with a second tier on the west side.

The stadium occasionally hosts international association football and rugby league competitions and acts as a venue for concerts by musical artists. Previous performances at the stadium include Elton John and The Who.

== History ==
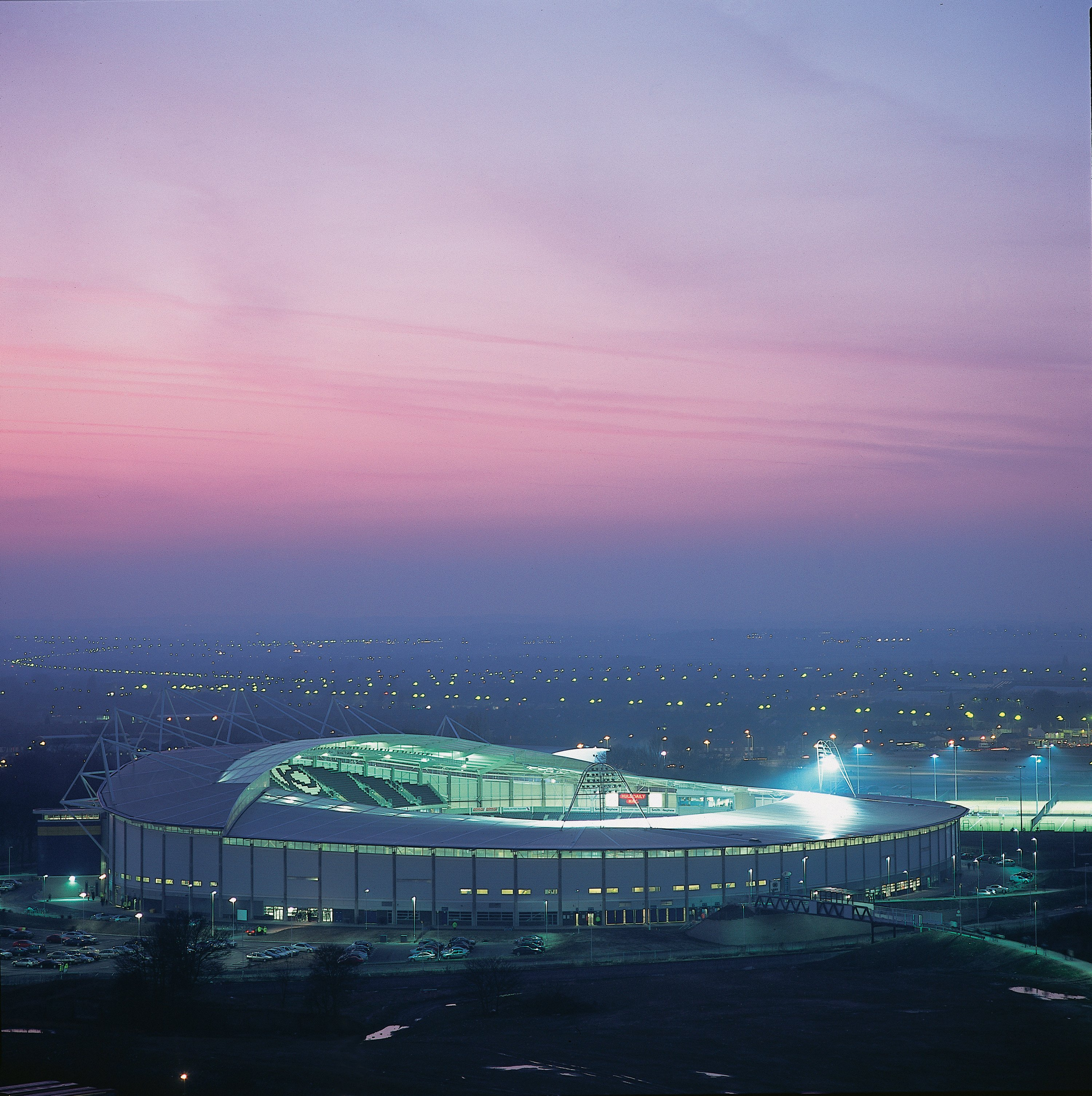
The stadium in 2007

The idea of a new stadium for Kingston upon Hull, whose professional football club Hull City had played at Boothferry Park since 1946, was first mooted in 1997. However, funds to finance such a project only became available when the city council sold a portion of its holdings in Kingston Communications. The council provided most of the funds, more than £42 million, with the rest stemming from government single regeneration budget grants and from the Football Stadium Improvement Fund.

The council appointed John Topliss to head the stadium construction project. He and his team partnered with consulting firm Drivers Jonas to explore preliminary issues such as stadium location, seating capacity, and facilities offered. Topliss stated that his team had "a totally blank canvas" and, by working with consultants, they made "a thorough assessment" of what was needed.

The project team considered over a dozen sites, inside and outside of the city, before settling on The Circle in West Park. Factors contributing to the decision include transport guidance, central government planning guidelines, existing athletic facilities, isolation from residential areas, and council ownership. The stadium site is located around 110 yards (100 m) from the original 'Circle' Stadium, one of Hull City's previous home grounds.

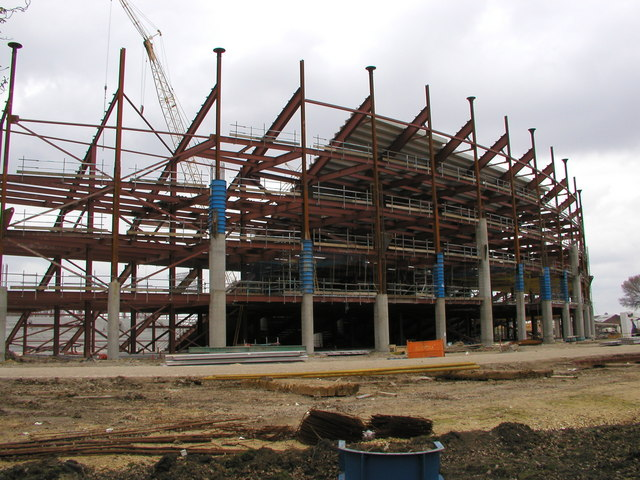
The stadium during construction

The final recommendation of Drivers Jonas included additional facilities for both indoor and outdoor sports for the people of West Hull, in addition to the main stadium, planned to seat from 25,000 to 30,000 spectators. Professional services firm Arup Associates provided initial concept proposals for the stadium. The Miller Partnership, an architectural and interior design firm, adopted these proposals during the stadium's design. The construction work began in the autumn of 2001 was undertaken by Birse Group.

There were a handful of obstacles during the course of the project, including Hull City A.F.C.'s receivership in early 2001, just after the granting of planning permission. Despite this, the stadium complex was completed on time after fourteen months of work and on budget, sitting at approximately £44 million. The stadium officially opened its doors on 18 December 2002.

That day, there were 22,467 spectators in attendance as Hull City beat Sunderland A.F.C. 1–0 in a friendly match to mark the occasion. Steve Melton scored the only goal of the game, consequently the first at the new stadium. Furthermore, the clubs contested for the 'Raich Carter Trophy' in honour of the late Raich Carter, who played for both of the clubs during his playing career, eventually also managing Hull between 1948 and 1951.

Twenty years later, almost to the day, on 17 December 2022, the clubs met again at the now MKM Stadium in the EFL Championship. Both sides agreed to recontest the Raich Carter Trophy to mark two decades at the Tigers' new stadium. The game ended 1–1 with Hull retaining the trophy, in front of a crowd of 18,120 spectators.

== Design ==
Stand names and capacities
| Stand Name | Location | Capacity |
|---|---|---|
| Smith & Nephew | North | 4,000 |
| Chris Chilton (Hull City); Johnny Whiteley (Hull F.C.) | East | 6,000 |
| MKM | South | 4,000 |
| Cranswick | Lower West | 6,000 |
| Cranswick | Upper West | 5,000 |

The stadium is an all-seater, asymmetrical bowl with an official capacity of 25,586. A single tier runs around the entire bowl that can seat approximately 20,000 spectators, while the West Stand has a second tier that can hold approximately 5,000 more. The stadium's seats are mostly black, with a band of white and amber seats around the circumference. White and amber seats form the word Hull in both the North Stand and the South Stand. In the East Stand, the seats form an image of a coronet, a symbol of the city that also appears in the club crest for Hull F.C. and in the coat of arms of the city council. Black, white, and amber were chosen to remain neutral toward the colours of its two tenants: black and white for Hull F.C. and black and amber for Hull City. The blue and gold of owner Hull City Council appear in the stadium's four external columns. Set within Hull's West Park, it is the first stadium in England to be built in a parkland setting.

Each stand has a name for corporate sponsorship purposes. On 4 July 2011, Hull City revealed that the stadium's West Stand would be sponsored by the local Cranswick plc under a two-year agreement, which was extended on 26 July 2013. On 10 July 2013, it was announced the East Stand would be sponsored by Ideal Standard and become known as the Ideal Standard Community East Stand. Ahead of the home fixture against West Bromwich Albion on 5 March 2022, the stand was renamed the Chris Chilton Stand, in honour of Hull City's all-time record goalscorer, the late Chris Chilton; on Hull F.C. match days, the stand will alternatively be named the Johnny Whiteley Stand, in honour of former Hull F.C. player and coach Johnny Whiteley, with a naming ceremony taking place at the home fixture against Bradford Bulls on 14 February 2026.

== Facilities ==
=== Hospitality ===
Corporate hospitality is provided by 28 executive boxes located between the two tiers of the West Stand, while security of the stadium is maintained through the use of 57 closed-circuit television (CCTV) cameras that cover the stadium. The stadium complex also includes the 1,500 capacity Bonus Arena, a skate park, two multi-use all-weather pitches, a community learning zone complete with classrooms, a health & fitness suite, a cyber cafe, and a library.

=== Pitch ===
The size of the playing surface is 114 x 74 m (125 x 81 yd) and made of rye grass with a 3% additive of artificial grass. This provides ample room for a FIFA-regulation football pitch of 105 x 68 m (115 x 74 yd) and a standard rugby league pitch of 100 x 68 m (109 x 74 yd), plus the minimum 6 m (6.56 yd) long in-goals at each end. The playing surface has an automated watering system and below-surface heating.

== Upgrades ==
Plans have previously been prepared for the potential extension of the stadium. A further 4,500 seats could be added to create a second tier to the East Stand, while there is also a possibility of adding extensions to both the North Stand and the South Stand of around 2,000 seats each. This would make the stadium a complete two-tier bowl with an overall capacity of approximately 34,000 seats.

Over the summer of 2007, SMC installed an LED screen in the North Stand to replace the old electronic scoreboard. The screen has an area of approximately 40 m^{2} (430 ft.^{2}) and displays such content as live home game feeds, match highlights, interviews, and action replays.

In 2011, Hull City owner Assem Allam announced that he wanted to buy the stadium freehold so he could develop, as he stated, "a sports park" on the site. After the council refused, Allam stated "I had in mind £30m to spend on the infrastructure of the club, to increase the stadium by 10,000 and to have commercial activities around the stadium – cafeterias, shops, supermarkets – to have all this to create income for the club so that in the future it can be self-financing and not relying on me."

Ahead of the 2013–14 season, goal-line technology was installed in the ground to abide by the new Premier League regulations.

In February 2023, Tan Kesler, Hull City's vice chairman, announced that the club was exploring the plans that had been made during the stadium's construction to upgrade the area surrounding the ground. These plans included "community pitches" and "multi-dimensional sports facilities", similar to those seen at the City of Manchester Stadium in Manchester, albeit on a smaller scale. Kesler stated that the club would work closely with the local council to ensure that the Hull Fair would not be impacted by any upgrades, as it occupies an area of land that could be used for potential development. However, in September 2024, the fair's organisers deemed the early plans to upgrade the area as "unacceptable" and that they were even willing to begin a boycott in retaliation, if action was not taken to change the plans.

After fixed segregation barriers between home and away fans were installed in the northeast curve of the stadium in December 2023, on 13 April 2025, it was announced that safe standing would be introduced to the stadium, with work set to begin at the end of the 2024–25 season. Approximately 2,700 seats were converted, with both the home and away ends affected. The upgrade was carried out by Ferco Seating and completed in time for the 2025–26 campaign.

== Awards ==
The stadium has received several honours. It was named the chief new development in Yorkshire at the Royal Institution of Chartered Surveyors Pro-Yorkshire Awards. It was also on the shortlist for the Prime Minister's Award for Better Public Building and received a high commendation in the British Construction Industry Awards in the Best Value category. In a 2005 poll that was carried out by Drivers Jonas and decided by football fans from across the country, the KC Stadium was rated highest in comfort, services and view among all grounds in the Football League and was also rated the most-improved venue.

== Tenants ==
=== Hull City ===
Hull City A.F.C. average attendances
| Season | League | Average | Ref. |
|---|---|---|---|
| 2025-26 | Championship | 21,400 | |
| 2024–25 | Championship | 21,323 | |
| 2023–24 | Championship | 21,980 | |
| 2022–23 | Championship | 17,973 | |
| 2021–22 | Championship | 12,888 | |
| 2020–21 | League One | N/A (Note: Because of the COVID-19 pandemic, all matches were held behind closed doors) | – |
| 2019–20 | Championship | 9,544 (Note: Because of the COVID-19 pandemic, the final nine matches of the season were held behind closed doors) | |
| 2018–19 | Championship | 12,165 | |
| 2017–18 | Championship | 15,622 | |
| 2016–17 | Premier League | 20,761 | |
| 2015–16 | Championship | 17,199 | |
| 2014–15 | Premier League | 23,557 | |
| 2013–14 | Premier League | 24,116 | |
| 2012–13 | Championship | 17,368 | |
| 2011–12 | Championship | 18,790 | |
| 2010–11 | Championship | 21,168 | |
| 2009–10 | Premier League | 24,390 | |
| 2008–09 | Premier League | 24,816 | |
| 2007–08 | Championship | 18,024 | |
| 2006–07 | Championship | 18,583 | |
| 2005–06 | Championship | 19,841 | |
| 2004–05 | League One | 18,027 | |
| 2003–04 | Third Division | 16,846 | |

Hull City moved into the stadium upon its opening. Soon, it became the backdrop for the club's rapid climb through the Football League. It first hosted the Tigers' home games during the second half of the 2002–03 season, with the first competitive match against Hartlepool United resulting in a 2–0 win for City. The Tigers attracted an average attendance of almost 17,000 in their first full season at the then-KC Stadium, the 2003–04 season. This figure was more than three times the average attendance for Third Division sides that season, and was only matched or exceeded by clubs in the Premier League and the First Division. The stadium hosted Premier League football for the first time in the 2008–09 season, with all 20,500 available season tickets selling out shortly after Hull City's play-off victory at Wembley Stadium.

Attendances for Hull City's league games at the stadium have averaged above 16,000 in each full season they have played there, apart from five years between 2017 and 2022, where a mixture of protests against Assem Allam's ownership of the club and the impacts of the COVID-19 pandemic reduced crowds significantly. The club has seen an upturn in home attendances since the sale of the club to Acun Ilıcalı, with an average of 17,973 supporters attending City games during the first full season with Ilıcalı as owner, the 2022–23 campaign. The following year, the 2023–24 season, the average home attendance grew yet further to 21,980.

Allocated segregation between home and away fans prevents the stadium's full-stated capacity from ever being reached. As a result, the record attendance set at the MKM Stadium is 25,030, which was recorded on 9 May 2010 for City's last match of the 2009–10 season against Liverpool, which ended 0–0. This marginally beat the previous record of 25,023, set just under two months earlier on 13 March 2010 in the 2–1 defeat to Arsenal. While playing in the Championship, the record stands at 24,616, set on 2 May 2026 when The Tigers beat Norwich City 2–1 to secure a place in the top six.

=== Hull F.C. ===
Hull F.C. moved into the stadium two months after the football club did, ahead of the 2003 Super League season. On 9 February 2003, they played their first match at the then-KC Stadium, a 24–16 fourth round Challenge Cup victory over Halifax in front of 15,310 spectators. In the Black and Whites' first four seasons after they left the Boulevard, they maintained good results. In 2003, the team narrowly missed out on the play-offs, before a third-placed finish in 2004 and a fourth-placed finish in 2005. However in the latter year they won the Challenge Cup, beating Leeds Rhinos 25–24 in a thrilling final. They came agonisingly close to victory again the following season, reaching the Super League Grand Final but ultimately losing 26–4 to St Helens. Aside from back-to-back Challenge Cup wins in 2016 and 2017, more recent years have been much less successful for the Black and Whites, only managing to reach the league play-offs three times since 2014, winning on none of those occasions.

Hull F.C. average attendances
| Season | League | Average | Ref. |
|---|---|---|---|
| 2025 | Super League | 12,159 | |
| 2024 | Super League | 10,975 | |
| 2023 | Super League | 12,355 | |
| 2022 | Super League | 10,771 | |
| 2021 | Super League | 5,527 | |
| 2020 | Super League | 10,843 (Note: Because of the COVID-19 pandemic, only the first seven matches of the season were held with spectators in attendance) | |
| 2019 | Super League | 11,478 | |
| 2018 | Super League | 12,174 | |
| 2017 | Super League | 11,718 | |
| 2016 | Super League | 11,407 | |
| 2015 | Super League | 11,343 | |
| 2014 | Super League | 11,166 | |
| 2013 | Super League | 11,640 | |
| 2012 | Super League | 12,403 | |
| 2011 | Super League | 12,483 | |
| 2010 | Super League | 13,731 | |
| 2009 | Super League | 13,244 | |
| 2008 | Super League | 13,432 | |
| 2007 | Super League | 14,606 | |
| 2006 | Super League | 10,866 | |
| 2005 | Super League | 10,604 | |
| 2004 | Super League | 11,458 | |
| 2003 | Super League | 11,598 | |

The average attendance of rugby league games at the MKM Stadium is often significantly lower than the football games played there. This is largely explained by the fact that Kingston upon Hull, as a city, is home to two separate professional rugby league sides, the other being Hull Kingston Rovers. Therefore, half of the city's rugby league fanbase does not follow the Black and Whites, unlike in football, where there is only one professional side. However, the stadium does in turn see a rise in attendance when the Hull derby is contested. It is therefore unsurprising that the highest attendance for a Hull F.C. game at the MKM Stadium was on 2 September 2007, when Hull K.R. thrashed the home side 42–6 in front of 23,004 spectators.

In April 2024, Hull F.C. chairman Adam Pearson discussed the possibility of the club leaving the MKM Stadium, as attendances for the Black and Whites' games have generally averaged far below full capacity since arriving. Pearson admitted that although he would be happy to explore the proposed idea of having a smaller stadium that was owned by the club, it was simply a "pipe dream" and not a currently viable option. He noted that if it were to happen, the new ground could be built similarly to both the Halliwell Jones Stadium and the York Community Stadium, at a suitable site in Hull like the Costello Stadium.

== Other sporting events ==
=== Association football ===
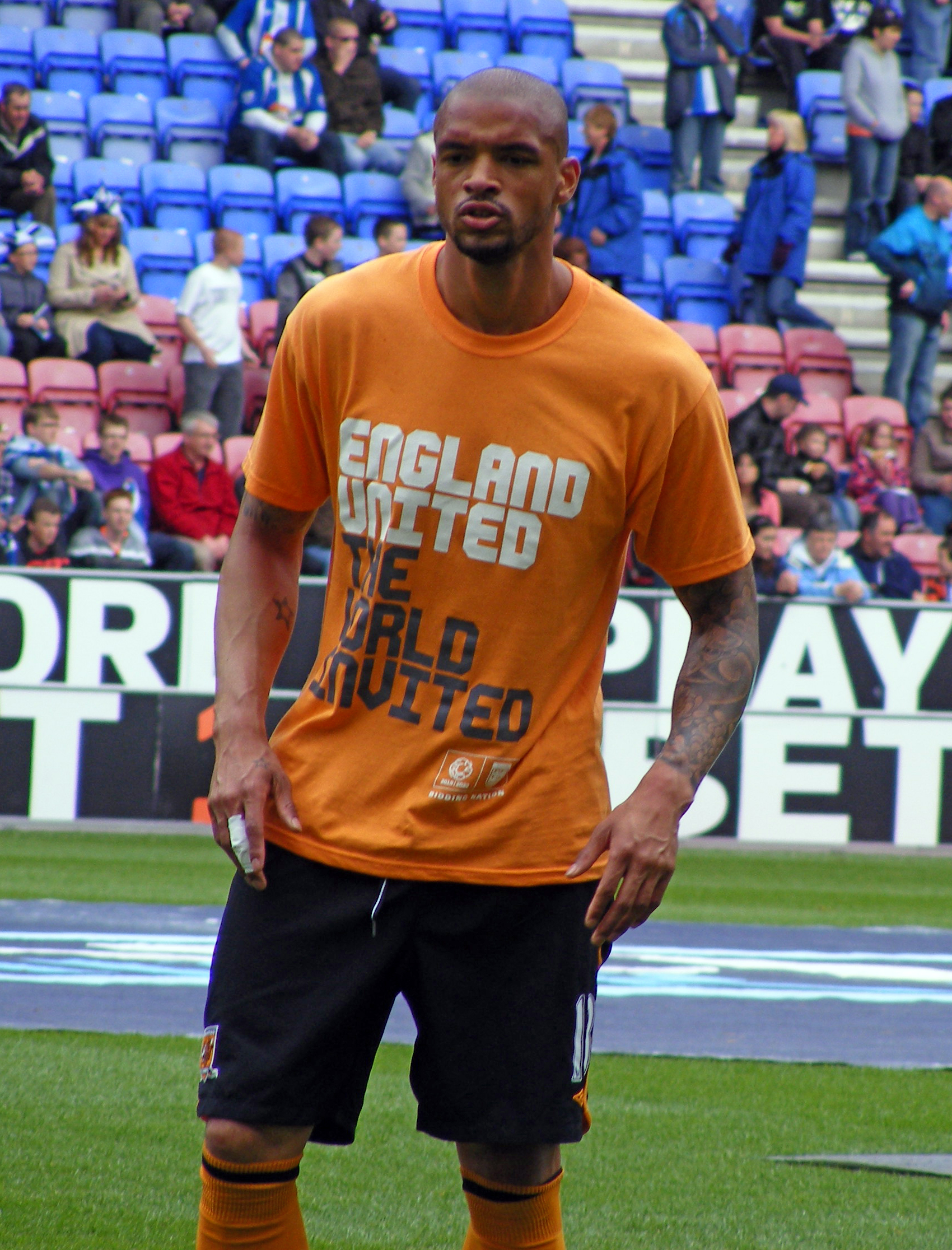
Hull City players wore shirts to promote England's 2018 FIFA World Cup bid while warming-up for games

The MKM Stadium has previously hosted five England U-21 matches, four of which came relatively soon after the stadium's opening. Most recently, the Young Lions played Kosovo U-21 in front of a crowd of 15,225 spectators in 2019.

| Date | Hosts | Result | Visitors | Attendance | Competition | Ref. |
|---|---|---|---|---|---|---|
| 2 June 2003 | England | 3–2 | Serbia and Montenegro | 24,004 | U-21 international friendly | |
| 17 February 2004 | England | 3–2 | Netherlands | 25,280 | U-21 international friendly | |
| 25 March 2005 | England | 2–2 | Germany | 21,746 | 2006 UEFA Euro U-21 Qualification Group 6 | |
| 19 August 2008 | England | 2–1 | Slovenia | 6,235 | U-21 international friendly | |
| 9 September 2019 | England | 2–0 | Kosovo | 15,225 | 2021 UEFA Euro U-21 Qualification Group 3 | |

In 2009, the then-KC Stadium was shortlisted as a possible venue for games at the 2018 FIFA World Cup should England win the right to host it. However, when the finalised list of venues was announced on 16 December 2009, the stadium was not among those included in the bid.

=== Rugby league ===
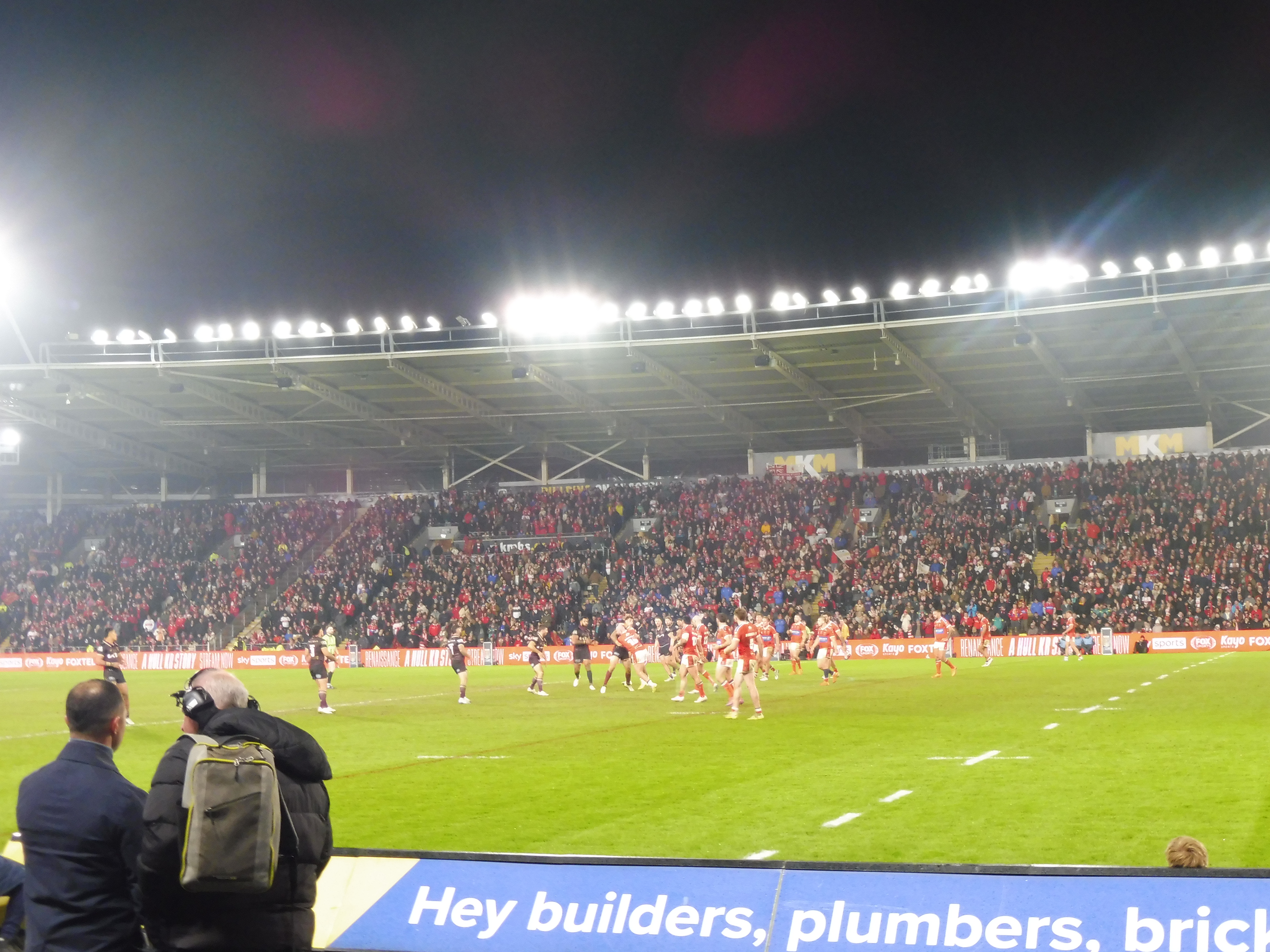
The MKM Stadium during the 2026 World Club Challenge

The MKM Stadium has previously hosted several rugby league matches at an international level. These include one match at the 2013 Men's Rugby League World Cup, two at the 2021 Men's Rugby League World Cup and one at the 2021 Women's Rugby League World Cup.

| Date | Hosts | Result | Visitors | Attendance | Competition |
|---|---|---|---|---|---|
| 15 November 2003 | Great Britain | 20–23 | Australia | 25,147 | 2003 Ashes series |
| 20 November 2004 | Great Britain | 26–24 | New Zealand | 23,377 | 2004 Rugby League Tri-Nations |
| 19 November 2005 | Great Britain | 14–26 | Australia | 25,150 | 2005 Rugby League Tri-Nations |
| 5 November 2006 | England | 38–14 | Samoa | 5,698 | 2006 Federation Shield |
| 3 November 2007 | Great Britain | 44–0 | New Zealand | 20,324 | 2007 Baskerville Shield |
| 12 November 2011 | England | 28–6 | New Zealand | 23,447 | 2011 Rugby League Four Nations |
| 9 November 2013 | England | 34–12 | Fiji | 25,114 | 2013 Men's Rugby League World Cup Group A |
| 1 November 2015 | England | 26–12 | New Zealand | 23,526 | 2015 Baskerville Shield |
| 27 October 2018 | England | 18–16 | New Zealand | 17,649 | 2018 Baskerville Shield |
| 22 October 2022 | New Zealand | 68–6 | Jamaica | 6,829 | 2021 Men's Rugby League World Cup Group C |
| 5 November 2022 | Papua New Guinea | 70–0 | Brazil | 7,080 | 2021 Women's Rugby League World Cup Group A |
| 5 November 2022 | New Zealand | 24–18 | Fiji | 7,080 | 2021 Men's Rugby League World Cup quarter-finals |

The MKM Stadium has become an occasional host venue for international rugby league games, including Great Britain matches in both the Tri-Nations and the Ashes competitions. The stadium hosted the 2004 Tri-Nations match in which New Zealand lost by a score of 26–24. The stadium also hosted the Tri-Nations game between Great Britain and Australia in 2005; the final score was 26–14 to Australia.

On 9 November 2013, the stadium hosted its only game of the 2013 Men's Rugby League World Cup. Hosts England beat Fiji 34–12 in front of a crowd of 25,114. Before the match, there was a minute's silence, followed by a spontaneous applause, to mark the sudden death of former Hull F.C. and England player Steve Prescott who had died earlier that day.

Due to the unavailability of its usual venue of Old Trafford, the stadium hosted the 2020 Super League Grand Final, held behind closed doors due to the COVID-19 pandemic. The stadium also hosted the 2026 World Club Challenge between Hull Kingston Rovers and Brisbane Broncos on 19 February 2026, setting a record sell-out attendance of 24,600 for a rugby league match played at the stadium.

== Concerts ==
As well as serving as a sporting venue, the MKM Stadium also hosts musical events, including such artists as Sir Elton John, Bryan Adams, Neil Diamond, R.E.M., Bon Jovi, and The Who.

JLS have also performed here in front of 20,000 fans as part of their 2010 JLS Tour.

Rod Stewart performed at the stadium on 14 June 2016 and Jeff Lynne's ELO played at the stadium on 1 July 2017.

== Gallery ==
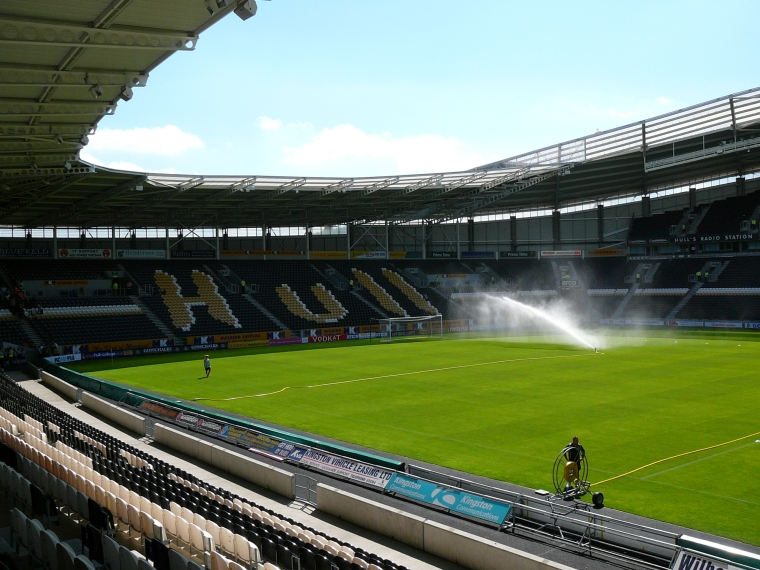
The South Stand

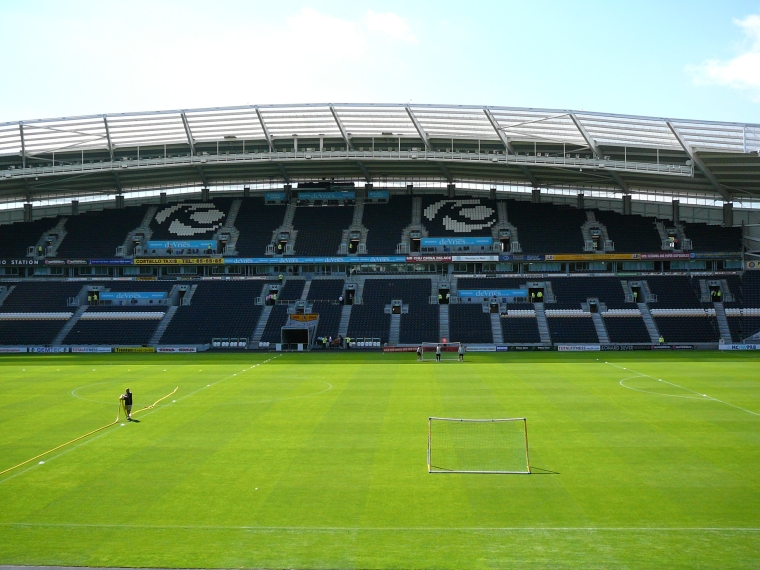
The West Stand

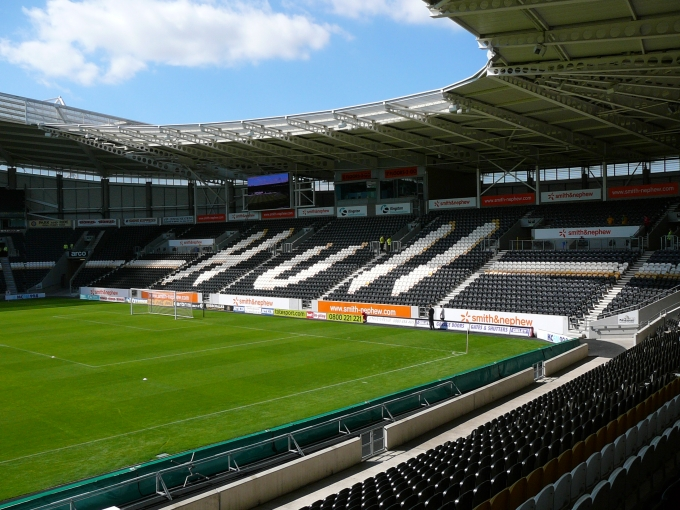
The North Stand

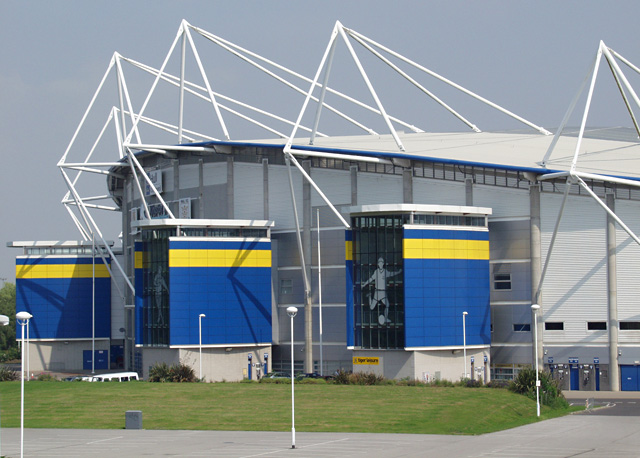
The stadium's exterior decorated in the City Council's colours

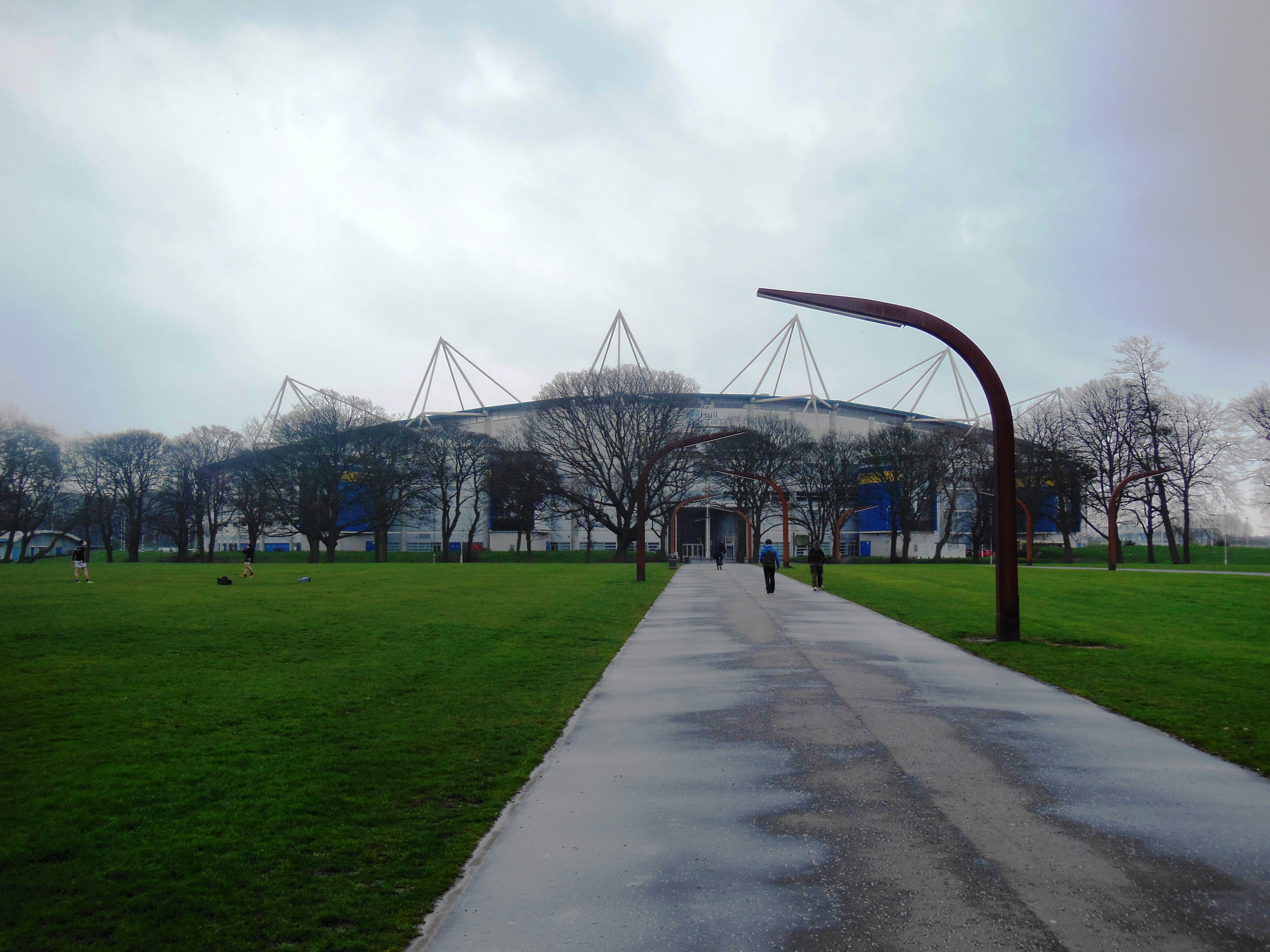
A view of the stadium from the surrounding West Park

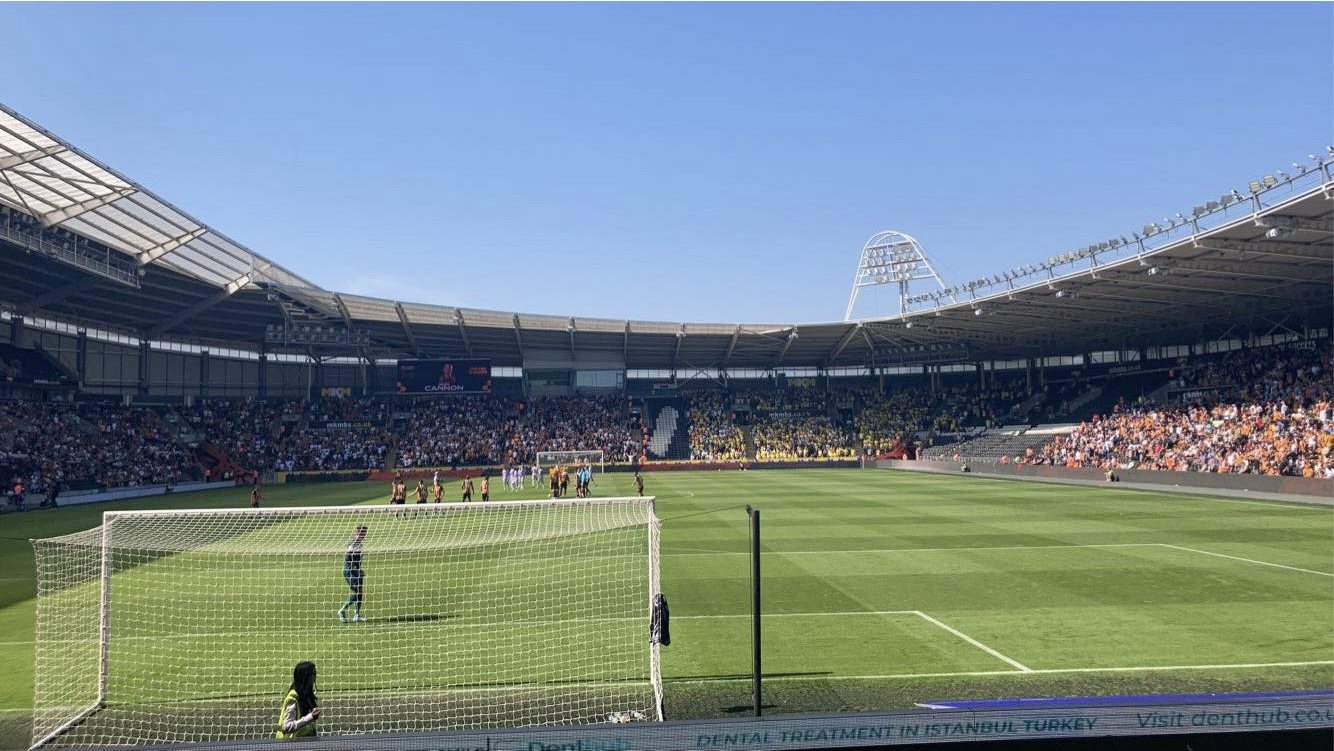
A view of the North Stand from the South Stand before the match against Norwich City on 13 August 2022.

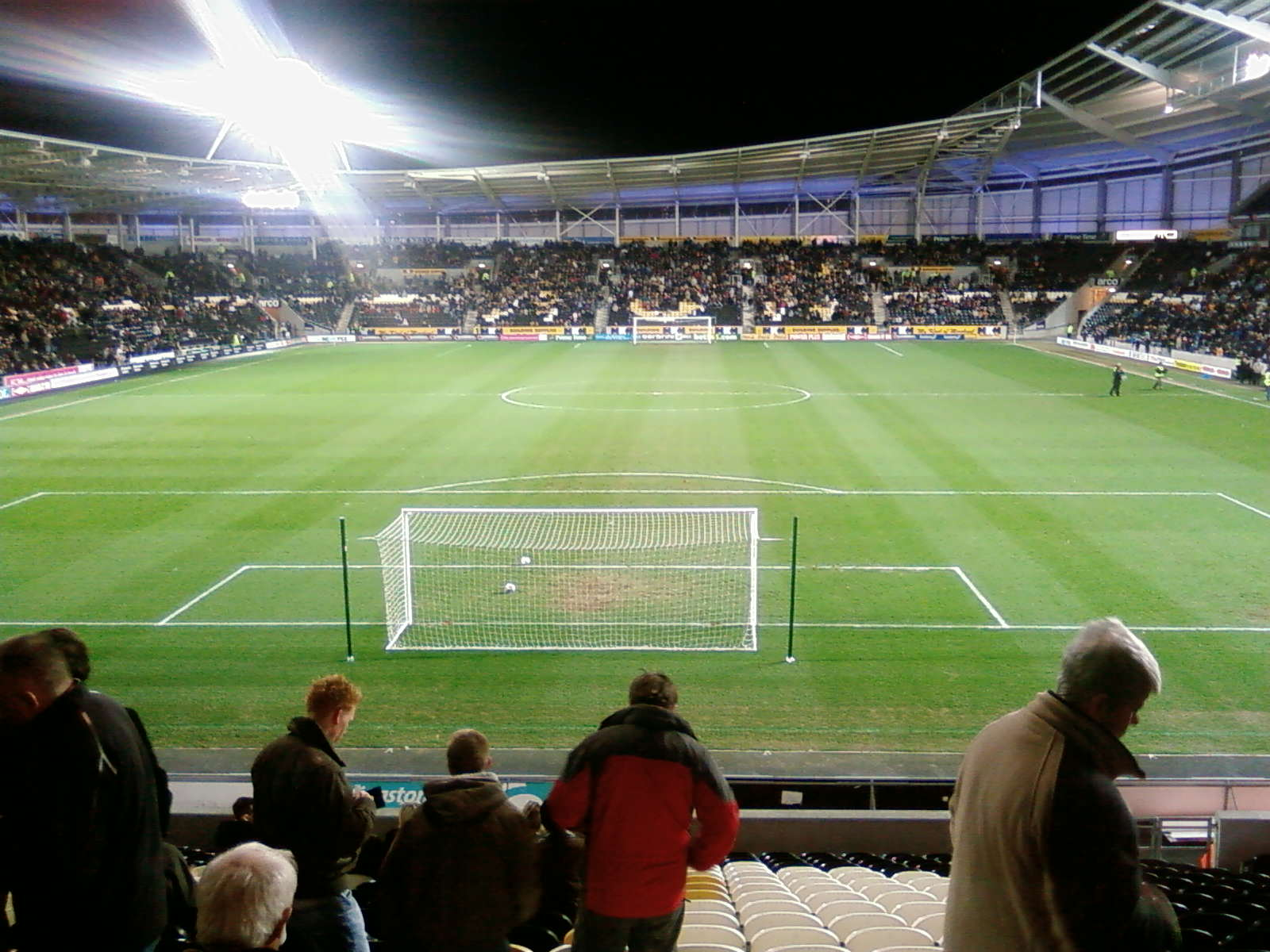
A view of the South Stand from the North Stand before the match against Burnley on 4 March 2008.

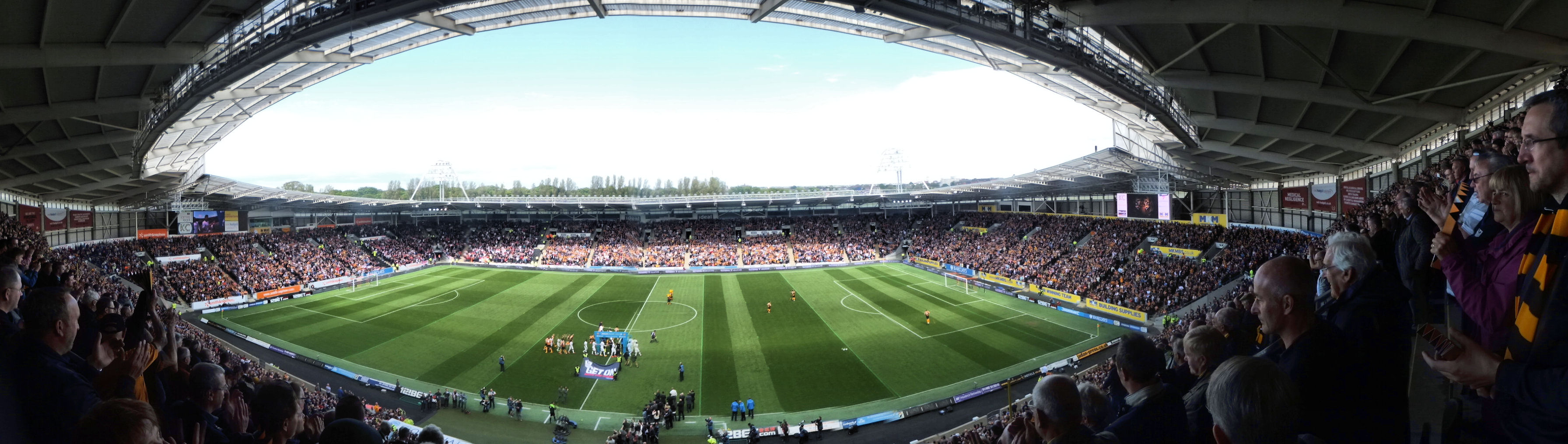
A panorama taken from the West Stand before the match against Manchester United on 24 May 2015.

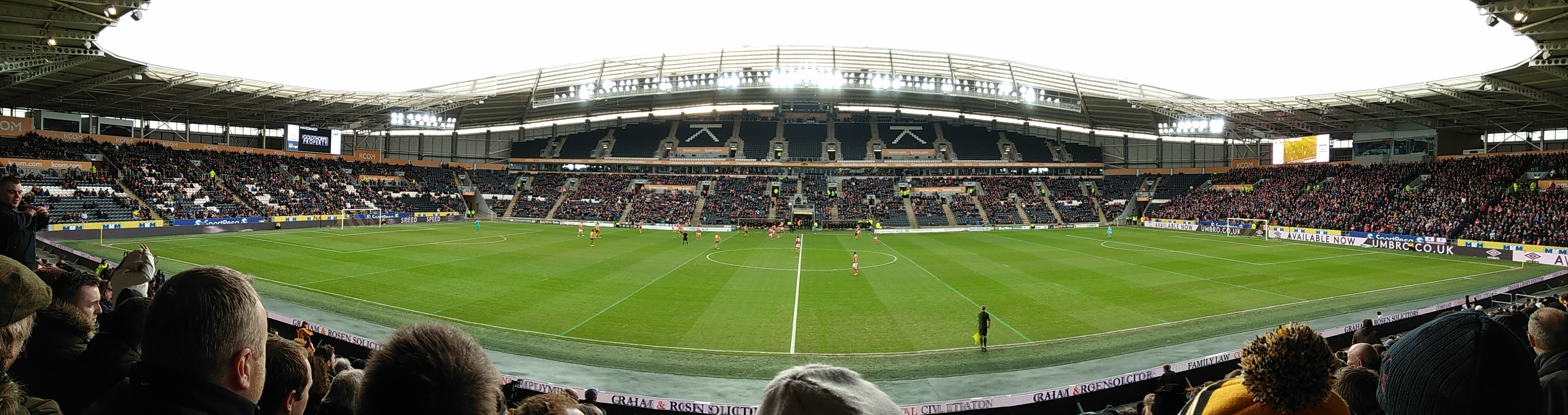
A panorama taken from the East Stand during the match against Nottingham Forest on 24 November 2018.

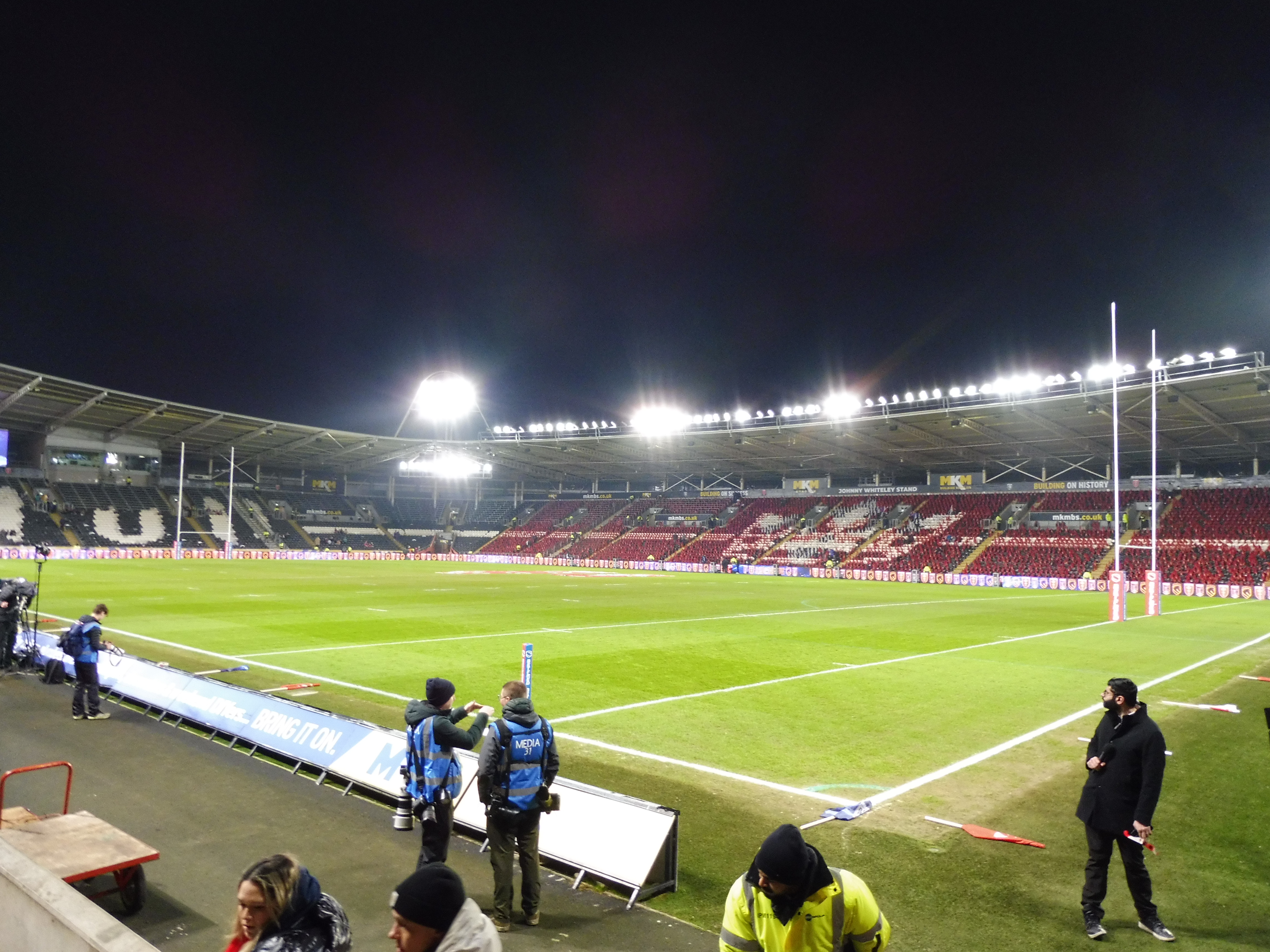
The stadium in rugby league configuration before the 2026 World Club Challenge on 19 February 2026.
