= Sir Walter St John's Grammar School for Boys =

Sir Walter St John's Grammar School For Boys

Location
- Battersea High Street; Battersea, London, SW11 3JB; England; 51.474°N 0.174°W

Information
- Motto: Rather Deathe than False of Faythe
- Established: 1700
- Closed: 1978
- Local authority: ILEA
- Staff: c. 30
- Gender: Boys
- Age: 11 to 18
- Enrolment: c. 500
- Houses: 6
- Publication: The Sinjun

Sir Walter St John's was a boys' school in Battersea. As the population and the English educational system changed, so did the school. The school was colloquially known as "Sinjuns" and was finally closed in 1986-7.

== Early history ==
In September 1700, Sir Walter St John, 3rd Baronet (1622–1708), of Battersea and of Lydiard Tregoze, Wiltshire, signed a deed that established a charity to form a school to "teach twenty poor boys of said parish" (Battersea). This was the start of Sir Walter St John's School, which was to survive for 286 years. By 1750, 83 boys and 5 girls were given instruction at the school. Battersea at the start of the 18th century was a village of some 200 dwellings containing about 1500 inhabitants. The rapid expansion of the London area during that and the following centuries, meant that there was a need of education for many more boys. A document of 1800 shows that the operation was based on the rules laid down by the Society for Promoting Christian Knowledge, and much of the curriculum was centred on the Bible.

== Development ==
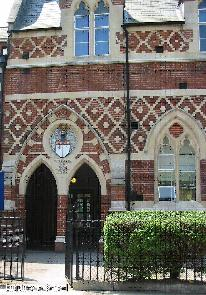
Butterfield's entry arch in 2004

During the first 150 years the name Sir Walter St John was seldom used and the school was called the "Battersea School" or the "Battersea Charity School". By 1832 the school had grown to hold 90 boys and 30 girls. In 1853 the Charitable Trust Act was enacted and the school passed under the control of the Charity Commissioners. The girls were soon transferred to the nearby Mrs Champion's School. The number of boys had increased to over 200, so the school was split into an Upper School and a Lower School. A new building was constructed in 1859 on Battersea High Street designed by William Butterfield. The entry arch of this building still exists.

By 1860 the name "Sir Walter St John's School" was being used. The Elementary Education Act 1870 had the result of splitting off the Upper School to form the newly founded Battersea Grammar School and in 1880 the Elementary School (part of the Lower School) was closed. The next change occurred in 1902, when the school was reorganised as a Secondary School.

== Buildings ==
Little is known of the early buildings before the William Butterfield wing was built. Enlargement occurred in 1898 when the old science block was built. The Great Hall together with the West Block was opened in 1915, while the modified library and laboratory block started operation in 1926. Temporary classrooms were assembled in 1918 but remained in use until the north extension became available in 1938. A Luftwaffe bomb destroyed the west wing in 1941 but it was rebuilt in 1952. The final change in the school's buildings happened in 1961, when the Science Block was replaced.

== Operation in the first half of the 20th century ==
The school was organised by the start of the 20th century into six levels or forms. The Intermediate Degree Examination of the University of London being taken in the 6th form. To have competition in sports and to help tuition six houses were organised in 1910. An Army Cadet unit was also formed in 1910 which existed until 1969. An Air Training Corps Flight was started in 1941 and continued after the disbandment of the army cadets. The number of boys in the school grew from 320 in 1917 to 544 in 1928 and remained at approximately at this level until the start of the Second World War in 1939. During this war the school with about 320 boys was evacuated to Godalming in Surrey, where it shared classrooms with the Godalming County School and Charterhouse School, a public school.

== Houses ==
The six houses in the school were named after honours granted to members of the St John family. A colour was associated with each house, and students were required to wear a cap with the school badge on the front and a small button in the colour of their house on the crown. The colours were also used in sportswear, shirts for soccer and a sash for Fives and boxing. Both were used in other sports.

- Beauchamp (Pronounced "Beecham") had blue as its colour. Oliver St John was also Baron Beauchamp.
- Bletsoe used Brown. Bletsoe Manor was also owned by the St John's family.
- Bolingbroke was the red house. Henry St John was made the first Viscount Bolingbroke in 1712.
- Grandison had yellow as its identifier. Commemorating Oliver St John, 1st Viscount Grandison
- Lydiard used the violet colour. Oliver St John was also created Baron St John of Lydiard Tregoze
- Tregoze had the green for its use. See above in Lydiard

Prior to Sir Walter St John's Boys Grammar School being amalgamated with William Blake School, there were only three houses in the School, the names were as stated above but were actually together: Grandison Bletsoe (GB), Beauchamp Bolingbroke (BB) and Lydiard Tregoze (LT).

== Post-war ==
After the return to Battersea, the school became Sir Walter St John's Grammar School. It was situated on Battersea High Street, next to the Thames, off the B305 and next to the Royal Academy of Dance. It had around 500 boys with a three-form entry. The school lay in the parish of St Mary's Church, Battersea.

=== Comprehensive ===
Such an amalgamation was planned in 1978 with the lower school (classes 1 to 3) going with the William Blake School and the Upper School remaining in Battersea High Street. The combined school was designated the Sir Walter St John's Comprehensive School. There were about 500 students in the Upper School and 300 in the Lower.

== Closure ==
The school was finally closed in 1986, when the students were transferred to the new Battersea Park School. The buildings remained unused from 1988 to 1990 when they were purchased by Thomas's London Day School and once again boys and girls received education in Battersea High Street.

The School had an uncommon status, operated by the local authority but legally a charity, which led to its being mentioned by name in several Education Acts, a highly unusual procedure. This meant that when it closed the assets of the school, principally property, did not revert to the Education Authority upon closure. Instead the Sir Walter St John's Educational Charity was formed in 1992 and continues to support disadvantaged children in the former London Boroughs of Battersea and Lambeth.

An Old Boys Association continues, with a golf society, football and cricket clubs and a masonic lodge.

== Notable Old Boys ==
See also Category:People educated at Sir Walter St John's Grammar School For Boys

- Martin Amis (1949–2023), British novelist
- Roger Glover, musician, Deep Purple
- Paul Bailey, writer
- Clifford Chapman, Dean of Exeter
- Francis Cole (1872–1959), British zoologist
- Marcel Escudier (1942–), Harrison Professor of Mechanical Engineering from 1989 to 2008 at the University of Liverpool, co-author (with A G Atkins) of A Dictionary of Mechanical Engineering, OUP, 2013
- Melvyn Hayes (1935–), British actor
- Maj-Gen Mervyn Janes, Colonel Commandant from 1973 to 1981 of the Royal Artillery
- Fred Landeg (born 1948), Chief Veterinary Officer from 2007 to 2008
- Buster Merryfield, actor, played Uncle Albert in Only Fools and Horses.
- Albert Samuels, Chairman from 1958 to 1959 of the London County Council
- Stanley Whitehead (1902–56), British physicist
