= Go Harder =

"Go Harder" may refer to:

- "Go Harder", song by British boyband JLS from 4th Dimensions Tour
- "Go Harder", song by Jaz-O
- "Go Harder", song by Future from Pluto (Future album)
