= Voas =

Voas is a surname. Notable people with the surname include:

- Brandon Voas (born 1993), American politician
- David Voas (born 1955), American quantitative social scientist
- Sheila Voas (born c. 1965), British veterinary surgeon and government official
