= John Kelland =

John Kelland may refer to:

- John Kelland (politician)
- John Kelland (veterinarian)
