= Fred Landeg =

Frederick John Landeg CBE

Chief Veterinary Officer
- In office 16 November 2007 – April 2008
- Preceded by: Debby Reynolds
- Succeeded by: Nigel Gibbens

Acting Chief Veterinary Officer
- In office 9 November 2007 – 16 November 2007

Personal details
- Born: 1948 (age 77–78)
- Education: Royal Veterinary College
- Profession: Veterinarian

Frederick John Landeg CBE (born 1948) was the Chief Veterinary Officer (CVO) of the United Kingdom and for Department for Environment, Food and Rural Affairs (DEFRA), from November 2007 to April 2008.

Landeg was born in 1948, and educated at Sir Walter St. John's School. He graduated from the Royal Veterinary College in 1971 and practiced as a veterinary surgeon until 1975, when he became a Veterinary Officer at the Ministry of Agriculture, Fisheries and Food. He became the UK's Deputy Chief Veterinary Officer, and Director General at DEFRA in 2004.

On 9 November 2007, Landeg became the UK's acting Chief Veterinary Officer following the early retirement of Debby Reynolds. On 16 November, he was promoted to the role officially.

Landeg retired in April 2008, and was appointed Commander of the Order of the British Empire (CBE) in the 2008 Birthday Honours. He received his honor from Queen Elizabeth II at Windsor Castle on 12 December 2008.
