= James Scudamore (veterinary surgeon) =

James Marfell Scudamore CB

Chief Veterinary Officer (United Kingdom)
- In office April 1997 – March 2004
- Preceded by: Keith Meldrum
- Succeeded by: Debby Reynolds

Assistant Chief Veterinary Officer (Scotland)
- In office 1990–1996

Personal details
- Profession: Veterinarian and academic

James Marfell Scudamore CB was the Chief Veterinary Officer (CVO) of the United Kingdom and for Department for Environment, Food and Rural Affairs (DEFRA) from April 1997 until he retired March 2004, and prior to this he was Assistant Chief Veterinary Officer, Scotland from 1990 to 1996. He was made a Companion of the Order of the Bath in the 2004 New Year Honours. He was succeeded as CVO by Debby Reynolds.

After he retired from CVO work he became professor of livestock and public health in the department of veterinary medicine at the University of Liverpool.
