= Agriculture and Trade Commission =

The Trade and Agriculture Commission (TAC) was created to advise the UK Department of International Trade (now the Department for Business and Trade) on matters of agricultural standards to ensure that the UK agriculture sector remains competitive in any free trade agreement, and advise on any export opportunities that can be opened to the UK agriculture sector. The ATC was set up for six months to submit an advisory report at the end of its work".

The Department of International Trade announced the creation of Agriculture and Trade Commission on the 29 June 2020 after the agriculture sector informed the government of their concerns regards food quality in any future trade agreement.

== Role ==
The ATC was to report directly to International Trade minister Liz Truss, and was to advise on:

- Trade policies the Government should adopt to secure opportunities for UK farmers
- Ensuring the sector remains competitive and that animal welfare and environmental standards in food production are not undermined.
- Advancing and protecting British consumer interests and those of the developing countries.
- Advising on how the UK engages the WTO to build a coalition that helps to promote higher animal welfare standards across the world.
- Developing trade policy that identifies and opens up new export opportunities for the UK agricultural industry in particular for SMEs, as this would benefits the UK economy as a whole.

== Leadership ==
The commission was chaired by food safety expert Tim J. Smith.

== Membership ==
The Agriculture and Trade Commission consisted of 16 members:

No	Name of Representative	Organisation Represented
1.	Tim J. Smith	Ex-Tesco Tech Director/FSA
2.	Nick von Westenholz	NFU England
3.	Andrew McCornick	NFU Scotland
4	John Davies	NFU Cymru
5.	Victor Chestnutt	Ulster Farmers Union
6.	Glyn Robert	Farmers Union of Wales
7.	Rob Hodgkins	Lamb Farmer
8.	Shanker Singham	Institute of Economic Affairs
9.	Nigel Gibbens	Former Chief Veterinary Officer
10.	Andrew Opie	British Retail Consortium
11.	Lord Mark Price	Former Trade Minister
12.	Tom Pengelly	Trade Out Of Poverty
13.	Sir Lockwood Smith	Former Trade Minister and Agriculture Minister for New Zealand
14.	Kate Nicholls	UK Hospitality
15.	Ian Wright CBE	Food and Drink Federation
16.	Caroline Drummond	Linking Environment And Farming (LEAF)

== See also ==
- Free trade agreements of the United Kingdom
