= Tim Smith, Baron Smith of Ranmoor =

British business executive

The Right Honourable The Lord Smith of Ranmoor CBE
- Official portrait, 2026

Member of the House of Lords
- Lord Temporal
- Life peerage 17 August 2026

CEO of UK Food Standards Agency
- Former
- In office 2008–2012

Chairman of UK Agriculture and Trade Commission
- In office 2020–2021

Personal details
- Born: Sheffield, England
- Party: Labour
- Education: Leeds University

Timothy John Smith, Baron Smith of Ranmoor CBE is a British business executive and government adviser involved in the food industry.

Lord Smith previously served as the CEO of the Food Standards Agency from 2008 to 2012, afterwards serving as group quality director at Tesco.

== Early life and education ==
A native of Sheffield, England, in 1978 he graduated from Leeds University with a degree in microbiology and zoology.

== Career ==
=== Early roles and Food Standards agency (1979–2012) ===
Smith held senior positions at Northern Foods from 1979 to 1994, including divisional director. In 1994 he was hired by Sara Lee as president of their UK operations. In November 1999, he was appointed executive director of Express Dairies Plc. After Express Dairies merged with Arla Foods in 2003, he became CEO of Arla Foods UK Plc on June 1, 2005, holding the position until April 2007.

=== Food Standards Agency (2008–2012) ===
In March 2008, the Food Standards Agency (FSA) appointed Smith as its CEO, making him responsible for the day-to-day running of the agency. In October 2012, Smith accepted a role at grocery company Tesco. On the advice of the Advisory Committee on Business Appointments, the move was approved by UK Prime Minister David Cameron "on the condition that [Smith] did not lobby civil servants or ministers on behalf of Tesco for two years." Smith left the FSA in October 2012. In 2013, The Guardian reported that it had obtained emails through the Freedom of Information Act that showed the FSA had ordered its members to declare any contact with Smith at each board meeting from 2012 to 2014. The order was described as an effort to deflect possible criticism concerning Smith's return to the private sector.

=== Tesco and Pret a Manger (2012–2019) ===
Smith was appointed group technical director of Tesco in October 2012, and later as the company's group quality director. A 2014 report revealed that Smith had given advice to the Department of Health on food contamination rates that June, resulting in "questions over whether Smith [had] abided by terms set by David Cameron" concerning not lobbying for Tesco for two years. Smith retired as Tesco quality director in February 2017. He continued to serve as a Tesco adviser.

In October 2018, Smith was hired by Pret a Manger as a food safety adviser, and given the role of reviewing its safety policies after several allergen incidents. Smith's review included an overhaul of their allergen procedures. In May 2019, Smith was appointed to the board of Pret a Manger as a non-executive director.

=== Cranswick and government roles (2020–2025) ===
In July 2020, he became chair of the Agriculture and Trade Commission. The commission was created by the UK government after a petition signed by a million people demanding legal protections for UK food standards, and set up to temporarily advise the government on post-Brexit trade. It delivered its final report in March 2021, recommending "liberalised trade" balanced with the UK's climate, environment, and animal welfare standards. In July 2021, he criticized UK ministers for avoiding the report, as the government had by that point failed to respond to the matter.

After joining Cranswick as a non-executive director in 2018, he became chair in 2021. He became co-chair of the Food and Drink Sector Council on August 30, 2022, serving alongside Victoria Prentis, and then Mark Spencer. As of 2025, he served as the council's co-chair along with Daniel Zeichner. In March 2025, Smith was announced as a member of the UK government's Food Strategy Advisory Board. He continues to be Cranswick chairman.

=== House of Lords ===
Smith was conferred as a life peer in the July 2026 political peerages to sit in the House of Lords as a Labour Party peer; he was created as Baron Smith of Ranmoor, of Ranmoor in the City of Sheffield on 17 August 2026.

== School boards and non-profits ==
In 2017 Smith became a trustee and board member of Farm Africa. As of 2023, he was chair of the non-profit's Fundraising Committee. He is a trustee of the Natasha Allergy Foundation, having been appointed in April 2019. Also in 2019 he became a member of Council for the University of Leeds, chairing several committees and serving on the Audit and Risk Committee, the Strategy and Investment Committee, and the Group on Pensions. In November 2023, Smith was appointed chair of the board of governors at Sheffield Hallam University, a role he retained in 2025.

== Recognition ==
In 2022 he was named a Commander of the Order of the British Empire (CBE) for services to agriculture, food, and drink trade policy. Smith was given a peerage in the July 2026 political peerages.
