= JLS Tour =

2010–11 concert tour by JLS

JLS: The Theatre Tour
- Tour by JLS
- Associated album: JLS
- Start date: 26 January 2010
- End date: 22 January 2011
- Legs: 3
- No. of shows: 2 in Ireland; 75 in the UK

JLS concert chronology
- JLS: The Theatre Tour (2010–11); 4th Dimensions Tour (2012)

JLS: The Theatre Tour is the headlining tour by English boy band JLS. The tour was launched in support of their debut studio album, JLS. The group performed throughout 2010 and early 2011, completing over 70 shows in the United Kingdom. The tour initially began in theatres however as the groups popularity grew, they performed at music festivals and arenas.

The shows at the historic Hammersmith Apollo were filmed and released to home video on 6 December 2010, known as Only Tonight: Live From London.

== Opening acts ==
- Phacebook (Leg 1)
- Chipmunk (Leg 1, select shows)
- Alex Gardner (Leg 2)
- Diana Vickers (Leg 2)
- Beatbullyz (Leg 3, select shows)
- Six D (Leg 3, select shows)
- Starboy Nathan (Leg 3, select shows)
- Stevie Hoang (Birmingham—5 February)
- Industry (Dublin, Belfast—February/March 2010)
- The Score (Peterborough)
- Ruff Diamondz (Peterborough, London—15–16 January)
- Edei (London—9–10 December)

== Setlist ==
Newcastle Royal Concert Hall—Newcastle—2 February 2010
1. "Private"
2. "Heal This Heartbreak"
3. "Kickstart"
4. "Beat Again"
5. "If I Ever"
6. "Crazy for You"
7. "Close to You"
8. "Only Making Love"
9. Medley:
  1. "I Want You Back" (Merrygold)
  2. "Don't Stop Till You Get Enough" (Gill)
  3. "Beat It" (Williams)
  4. "The Way You Make Me Feel" (Humes)
10. "One Shot"
11. "Keep You"
12. "Only Tonight"
13. "Umbrella" / "Beat Again" (Reprise)
14. "Everybody in Love"
Press & Journal Arena—Aberdeen—29 November 2010
1. "Outta This World"
2. "That's My Girl"
3. "Eyes Wide Shut"
4. "One Shot"
5. "Heal This Heartbreak"
6. "Beat Again"
7. "Work"
8. "Umbrella"
9. "Other Side of the World"
10. "I Know What She Likes"
11. "Love You More"
12. "Everybody (Backstreet's Back)" / "Girlfriend" / "I Want It That Way" / "Pop"
13. "Better for You"
14. "Superhero"
15. "The Club Is Alive"
16. "Everybody in Love"

== Tour dates ==
Date	City	Country	Venue
Europe
26 January 2010	Rhyl	Wales	Pavilion Theatre
29 January 2010	Margate	England	Winter Gardens
30 January 2010	Margate	England	Winter Gardens
1 February 2010	Ipswich	England	Regent Theatre
2 February 2010	Nottingham	England	Nottingham Royal Concert Hall
3 February 2010	Newcastle	England	Newcastle City Hall
5 February 2010	Birmingham	England	LG Arena
6 February 2010	Manchester	England	Carling Apollo Manchester
7 February 2010	Sheffield	England	Sheffield City Hall
9 February 2010	Brighton	England	Brighton Centre
10 February 2010	Bournemouth	England	Windsor Hall
12 February 2010	Brentwood	England	Brentwood Centre
13 February 2010	London	England	Hammersmith Apollo
14 February 2010	Liverpool	England	Liverpool Empire Theatre
17 February 2010	Plymouth	England	Plymouth Pavilions
18 February 2010	Bristol	England	Colston Hall
19 February 2010	Cardiff	Wales	Cardiff International Arena
21 February 2010	Glasgow	Scotland	Clyde Auditorium
22 February 2010	Manchester	England	Carling Apollo Manchester
23 February 2010	Blackpool	England	Opera House Theatre
25 February 2010	London	England	Hammersmith Apollo
27 February 2010	Dublin	Ireland	The O_{2}
28 February 2010	Belfast	Northern Ireland	Waterfront Hall
1 March 2010	Belfast	Northern Ireland	Waterfront Hall
2 March 2010	Belfast	Northern Ireland	Waterfront Hall
4 March 2010	London	England	Hammersmith Apollo
16 June 2010^{[A]}	Cork	Ireland	The Docklands
17 June 2010^{[A]}	Cork	Ireland	The Docklands
18 June 2010^{[B]}	Douglas	Isle of Man	Nobles Park
19 June 2010^{[C]}	Haydock	England	Haydock Park Racecourse
15 July 2010^{[D]}	Warwick	England	Warwick Castle
16 July 2010^{[E]}	Tetbury	England	Westonbirt Arboretum
17 July 2010	Escot	England	Escot Park
18 July 2010^{[F]}	Peterborough	England	The Embankment
22 July 2010^{[G]}	Epsom	England	Epsom Downs Racecourse
23 July 2010	Hamilton	Scotland	Hamilton Park Racecourse
24 July 2010^{[H]}	Pontypridd	Wales	Ynysangharad Park
25 July 2010^{[I]}	Birchington-on-Sea	England	Quex Park
Outta This World Tour
29 November 2010	Aberdeen	Scotland	Press & Journal Arena
30 November 2010	Renfrew	Scotland	Braehead Arena
2 December 2010	Liverpool	England	Echo Arena Liverpool
3 December 2010	Liverpool	England	Echo Arena Liverpool
4 December 2010	Cardiff	Wales	Cardiff International Arena
6 December 2010	Bournemouth	England	Windsor Hall
7 December 2010	Birmingham	England	LG Arena
9 December 2010	London	England	The O_{2} Arena
10 December 2010	London	England	The O_{2} Arena
11 December 2010	Nottingham	England	Trent FM Arena Nottingham
13 December 2010	Glasgow	Scotland	SECC Concert Hall 4
14 December 2010	Aberdeen	Scotland	Press & Journal Arena
16 December 2010	Manchester	England	Manchester Evening News Arena
17 December 2010	Sheffield	England	Motorpoint Arena Sheffield
18 December 2010	Newcastle	England	Metro Radio Arena
20 December 2010	Manchester	England	Manchester Evening News Arena
21 December 2010	Birmingham	England	LG Arena
22 December 2010	London	England	Wembley Arena
23 December 2010	London	England	Wembley Arena
3 January 2011	Cardiff	Wales	Cardiff International Arena
4 January 2011	Nottingham	England	Trent FM Arena Nottingham
5 January 2011	Sheffield	England	Motorpoint Arena Sheffield
7 January 2011	Belfast	Northern Ireland	Odyssey Arena
8 January 2011	Belfast	Northern Ireland	Odyssey Arena
9 January 2011	Dublin	Ireland	The O_{2}
10 January 2011	Dublin	Ireland	The O_{2}
12 January 2011	Belfast	Northern Ireland	Odyssey Arena
13 January 2011	Belfast	Northern Ireland	Odyssey Arena
15 January 2011	London	England	The O_{2} Arena
16 January 2011	London	England	The O_{2} Arena
18 January 2011	Cardiff	Wales	Cardiff International Arena
19 January 2011	Birmingham	England	LG Arena
20 January 2011	Newcastle	England	Metro Radio Arena
22 January 2011	Manchester	England	Manchester Evening News Arena
23 January 2011	Nottingham	England	Trent FM Arena Nottingham
24 January 2011	Cardiff	Wales	Cardiff International Arena
26 January 2011	Newcastle	England	Metro Radio Arena
28 January 2011	Sheffield	England	Motorpoint Arena Sheffield
29 January 2011	Liverpool	England	Echo Arena Liverpool

Festivals and other miscellaneous performances
^{A} Live at the Marquee
^{B} The Isle of Man Bay Festival
^{C} Haydock Music Nights
^{D} Summer Proms Concert
^{E} Forestry Commission Live
^{F} Sound City Festival
^{G} Epsom Live
^{H} Ponty's Big Weekend
^{I} Sound Island Festival

=== Box office score data ===
Venue	City	Tickets sold / available	Gross revenue
The O_{2}	Dublin	26,165 / 26,165 (100%)	$1,216,553
Waterfront Hall	Belfast	5,826 / 5,826 (100%)	$243,104
The O_{2} Arena	London	58,654 / 62,228 (94%)	$2,949,480
Manchester Evening News Arena	Manchester	42,552 / 43,483 (98%)	$2,042,300
