= RD (group) =

British girl group

- Also known as: Ruff Diamondz
- Origin: London, United Kingdom
- Genres: Pop, R&B, grime, funky house
- Years active: 2009–2011
- Label: Polydor
- Past members: Julie "Chronz" Norton; Martika Lecointe-Akore; Troy Hudson

RD, also known as Ruff Diamondz, were a British girl group from London comprising Julie "Chronz" Norton, Martika Lecointe-Akore, and Troy Hudson.

The group were formed in 2009 when a manager introduced the members to each other via Myspace. They subsequently spent six months training in fitness, choreography, singing and styling before they performed live for the first time. In September 2010, Ruff Diamondz released a mixtape titled The Intro of RD aka Ruff Diamondz, followed by their debut single "Do It Like Me" in November 2010 via Polydor Records. They were profiled in The Guardian as the newspaper's "New Band of the Week" in October 2010. Also during 2010, Ruff Diamondz toured the United Kingdom with JLS on their arena tour and N-Dubz on the MOBO Awards tour.

By 2011, the group had officially changed their name to RD due to copyright issues. They released their second single "Got Me Burnin'", co-written by Katy B and produced by Geeneus of Rinse FM, in October 2011. The single was playlisted on BBC Radio 1 and received favourable reviews from the Daily Star, Mixmag, MuuMuse, Popjustice, and The Singles Jukebox. Polydor dropped the group the same month, and in November 2011 they announced they had split up after Hudson decided to leave the group.

Lecointe-Akore embarked on a solo career under the name Martika LA, releasing the single "Give Me Your Love" in 2012.

== Discography ==
- The Intro of RD aka Ruff Diamondz (2010)
- "Do It Like Me" (2010)
- "Got Me Burnin'" (2011)
