= Stanley Whitehead (physicist) =

British physicist

Stanley Whitehead (1902 – 1956) was a British physicist.

== Life ==
Whitehead was born in Sutton, Surrey in 1902 and educated at Sir Walter St. John's School. After winning a scholarship to Jesus College, Oxford, Whitehead obtained first-class degrees in mathematics and in physics before carrying out research with Lord Cherwell at the Clarendon Laboratory. He was appointed as a physicist at the Electrical Research Association, becoming Director in 1946 and holding this post until his death in 1956. His particular interest was dielectric research, and he had an international reputation in fields such as telephone and radio interference. During the Second World War, he was engaged in the ERA's work on bomb and mine locators. He played Rugby fives in his youth, and later served as Secretary of the Rugby Fives Association. He was a member of the Institute of Electrical Engineers and a Fellow of the Institute of Physics. He was awarded a fellowship of Queen Mary College, London in recognition of his services to education.
