= Debby Reynolds =

Chief Veterinary Officer of the United Kingdom from 2004 to 2007

Debby Reynolds CB

Chief Veterinary Officer
- In office March 2004 – 9 November 2007
- Preceded by: Jame Scudamore
- Succeeded by: Fred Landeg

Personal details
- Education: University of Bristol; University of Reading
- Profession: Veterinarian

Deborah Reynolds CB served as the Chief Veterinary Officer (CVO) of the United Kingdom from March 2004 until she retired in November 2007. She is usually referred to as Debby Reynolds, or less often as Deborah Reynolds.

== Chief Veterinary Officer ==
Reynolds was the Chief Veterinary Officer (CVO) of the United Kingdom and for the Department for Environment, Food and Rural Affairs (DEFRA) from March 2004 to 9 November 2007. As CVO, Reynolds was the British government's main spokesperson on animal health, and was in the British nationwide news repeatedly to explain policy and answer questions about outbreaks or control of serious animal infections, such as foot-and-mouth disease, H5N1 bird flu, bovine TB, rabies and bluetongue virus.

On 9 November 2007, DEFRA announced that Reynolds had opted to take early retirement at the age of 55 years, and that the Deputy CVO Fred Landeg would take over temporarily as acting CVO with immediate effect.

She was invested as a Companion of the Order of the Bath (CB) in the New Year Honours 2008.

== Personal life ==
Reynolds is a keen gardener and birdwatcher, currently serving as President of the Berkshire Ornithology Club and she was a board member of British Trust of Ornithology until 2023. Her husband, David keeps and shows game fowl, chickens and bantams.

== Career ==
- 1970 to 1975 - Studied veterinary science at the University of Bristol, a 5-year course, gained an honours degree, BVSc
- 1984 - PhD in the epidemiology of enteric viruses in calves, University of Reading
- 1975 to 1984 - Research Officer at the Institute for Animal Health
- 1984 to 1994 - Worked in the Veterinary Investigation Service of the State Veterinary Service and moved to the Ministry of Agriculture, Fisheries and Food (MAFF) in 1991 where she worked until 1994
- 1994 to 1997 - Head of the Bacteriology Department at the Veterinary Laboratories Agency
- 1997 to 2001 - Head of Endemic Animal Disease and Zoonoses at MAFF, which subsequently became DEFRA
- 2001 to 2004 - Veterinary Director of the Food Standards Agency
- March 2004 to 9 November 2007 - Chief Veterinary Officer for the United Kingdom and Director General for Animal Health and Welfare at Defra
- 2008 to 2013 - Non Executive Director, NHS Berkshire Primary Care Trust
- 2008 to 2013 - Board member Health Protection Agency
- 2008 to present Affiliated Professor Colorado State University
- 2008 to 2019 - Consultant for US Department of Agriculture, developing National Animal Program with government of Georgia
- 2009 to 2015 - Chairperson for National Trust on Natural Environment Panel
- 2013 to 2017 - Chairman of Governors The Abbey School, Reading UK
- 2016 to 2017 - Consultant to Food and Agriculture Organisation, Kyrgyzstan
- 2019 to 2021 - Consultant to USDA in Vietnam, Cambodia and Laos
