= Jocky Wilson Cup =

Professional darts team tournament (2009)

Tournament information
- Dates: 5 December 2009
- Venue: Braehead Arena
- Location: Glasgow
- Country: Scotland
- Organisation(s): PDC
- Format: Team Event Legs

Champion(s)
- England

The Jocky Wilson Cup (officially the PartyPoker.com Jocky Wilson Cup for sponsorship) was a professional darts team tournament that took place at the Braehead Arena in Glasgow, Scotland, on 5 December 2009. This one-off tournament, which was named after Jocky Wilson, a two-time world darts champion, was the last of the eight non-ranking Professional Darts Corporation (PDC) events of the 2009 season. The tournament was contested by two nations of two players each. The winning nation was the first country to earn four points over a five-match series – four singles fixtures and one doubles game.

Phil Taylor and James Wade of England won the competition and whitewashed their opponents Gary Anderson and Robert Thornton of Scotland 6–0. Wade won the first game against Anderson 6–4; Taylor beat Thornton 6–0 in the second. Wade and Taylor defeated their opponents in the doubles match 6–2 for the overall victory and won their final two singles matches 6–4 over their Scottish opponents.

== Background and format ==
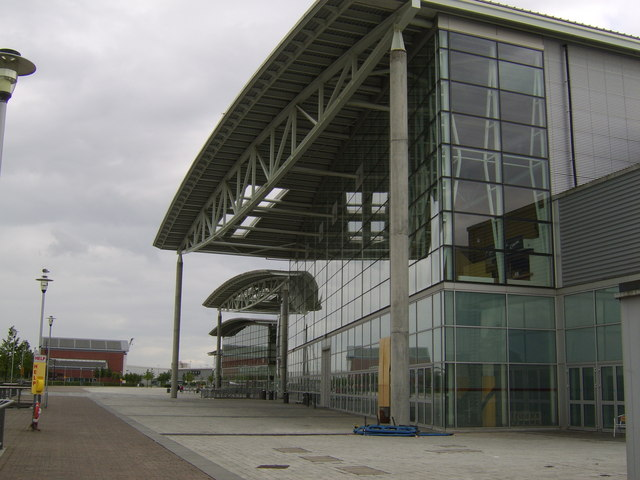
The Braehead Arena in Glasgow, where the tournament was staged

The Jocky Wilson Cup, sponsored by online gambling company Partypoker, was launched in August 2009 by the PDC. The tournament was named after Jocky Wilson, a two-time world darts champion. It was held at the Braehead Arena in Glasgow, Scotland, on 5 December. This was the last of eight non-ranking PDC-sanctioned events in the 2009 season. The tournament was broadcast on Sky Sports 2 in the United Kingdom and on PDC TV. Two nations of two players each competed in the tournament: Robert Thornton and Gary Anderson for Scotland; Phil Taylor and James Wade for England. (Note: Each player was the highest ranked in their respective countries.)

There were five matches in the cup: four 501 points singles matches and one 1001 points doubles game. (Note: The doubles 1001 match format was the first time it was used in a PDC competition.) All games were best of 11 legs, so the first to win six legs would win the tournament. If the doubles match was tied, the team with the most maximum scores or the player who made the first maximum would be declared the winner. One point was awarded to the winners of each four singles games and two to the winning team of the doubles fixture. The first country to earn four points would win the tournament.

Bookmakers installed England as the favourite to win the event. Thornton, the 2009 Players Championship Finals runner-up, said playing in Glasgow against England would possibly be the high point of his career and was looking forward to it. Anderson said he liked the challenge of playing Taylor and Wade due to their form. Taylor commented it would be desirable to win the tournament and dedicate it to Wilson. Wade said his match against Anderson had the potential to establish the overall mood. Sportscaster Sid Waddell said that Taylor would not treat the event as an exhibition and did not expect England to win all five matches.

== Tournament summary ==
All matches were held on the evening of 5 December. Anderson played Wade in the opening match of the competition, taking 20 minutes to build a 4–0 lead from checkouts of 96 and 118, and a double 5 finish. He missed four targets in leg five, allowing Wade to claim his first leg with an 85 checkout on the bullseye. After the break, Wade finished twice on double 10 to go 4–3 behind and tied at 4–4 with a double 12 after Anderson missed tops to go 5-4. Wade used the misses from Anderson at the bullseye and double 16 to take the lead and secure a 6–4 win with a double 10. Wade said post-match he was "really lucky" to have won because he missed his targets in the first four legs and felt that he would have lost if Anderson had gone five legs ahead.

The second match was contested by Taylor and Thornton. Finishes on double 8 and double 2 won Taylor the first two legs after Thornton missed the double twice to win the second. A 78 checkout put Taylor three legs in front, followed by finishing on double 8 in leg four after Thornton failed twice to hit double 18. Finishes on double 16 and 10 allowed Taylor to whitewash Thornton 6–0. Taylor commented that Thornton had not played to the best of his ability and England was under pressure to finish the task.

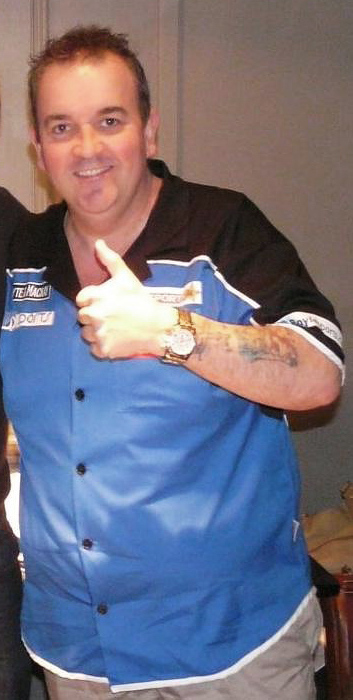
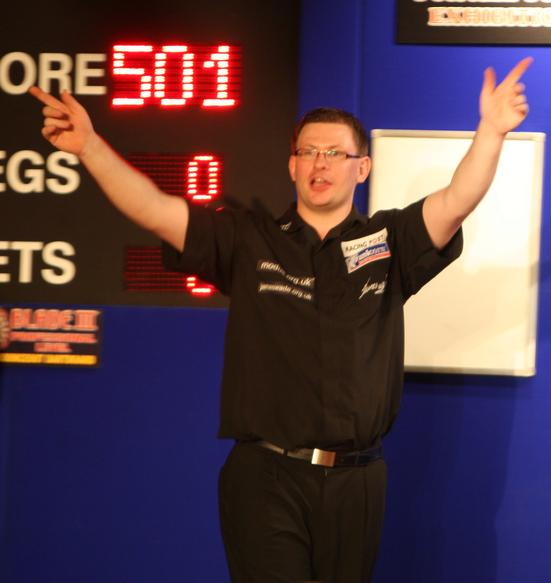
Phil Taylor and James Wade of England whitewashed the Scotland team of Gary Anderson and Robert Thornton to win the tournament.

The doubles match was next. Anderson hit a 180 to set up a 59 checkout for Thornton to win the first leg for Scotland. Wade finished with a 180 and a double 20, and thus England won leg two and took the lead when Wade made an 88 checkout after Thornton missed double 18. Wade was unable to claim leg four twice, but when Thornton missed double 20, he took a 3–1 lead for England. He extended the nation's lead by one leg on the double 10 before two maximum and a double 6 finish from Thornton, giving Scotland a win on leg 6. He missed double 20 for a 116 checkout, Wade hit double 16 to put England another leg ahead. England won the match 6–2 and the Cup with Taylor's finish on double 18. Wade commented on England's overall win: "It's brilliant but the match isn't over yet and it would be great to win the final two games too. Gary and Robert will be playing for pride and I'm sure they'll do a job in the last two games."

Wade met Thornton in the fourth game. Thornton won the first leg on a 95 checkout, before Wade broke back scoring 168 to set up a double 12 finish that he hit on the first try. Wade took the third leg after Thornton failed to complete a 156 checkout. Thornton produced a 106 checkout to move level again on leg four before Wade made an 11-dart finish to take the lead again in the fifth leg. Wade missed double 12 three times and Thornton won leg six on double 20. Checkouts of 90 and 160 provided Wade with a clear lead until Thornton won a fourth leg with a clinical finish on the bullseye for a 121 checkout. Thornton scored a maximum in the tenth leg, but Wade finished on double 14 to take a 6–4 victory.

Anderson and Taylor played the final match. Anderson took the opening leg on double 4 after Taylor failed to complete a 135 checkout on the bullseye. A 96 checkout from Taylor in leg two tied the game before Anderson finished on double 20 in the third leg. Taylor took leg four with a 68 checkout when Anderson missed the bullseye and the fifth in 11 darts for a clear lead. He took the sixth leg and Anderson the seventh on double 20 after Taylor missed the bullseye for a 161 checkout. A 13-dart finish won Taylor leg eight and Anderson the ninth on double 16. In the tenth leg, Taylor threw a 10 dart leg to beat Anderson 6–4 and complete England's 6–0 whitewash of Scotland.

== Post-tournament ==
Taylor was pleased to win the tournament, saying, "Jocky's a legend so to win the first event staged in his name is fantastic. Robert came back brilliantly from losing 6-0 and Gary was superb, but James showed his quality. It was great fun." Wade observed the crowd booing the English team, which he said had no effect on Taylor or himself. He added, "we did the job that we came to Glasgow to do, so all in all, a good night all round." Thornton commented on Scotland's defeat: "Both myself and Gary missed too many doubles but it was a really enjoyable experience. You're never a loser with support like this and hopefully we can give them plenty to cheer in the future."

Giles Smith of The Times called the competition "a pioneering and, you would have to say, pretty ambitious attempt to reconjure the broiling patriotic fervour and all-out historical needle that used to accompany the old home international football matches between England and Scotland, except with darts." This was the only time the Jocky Wilson Cup was held; the PDC World Cup of Darts succeeded it in 2010.

== Draw ==
Scotland
5 December 2009

England
0
Points
6

| | | | Legs | Points |
|---|---|---|---|---|
| 1 | (Scotland) | Gary Anderson | 4 | 0 |
| 1 | (England) | James Wade | 6 | 1 |
| 2 | (Scotland) | Robert Thornton | 0 | 0 |
| 2 | (England) | Phil Taylor | 6 | 1 |
| 3 | (Scotland) | Robert Thornton/Gary Anderson | 2 | 0 |
| 3 | (England) | Phil Taylor/James Wade | 6 | 2 |
| 4 | (Scotland) | Robert Thornton | 4 | 0 |
| 4 | (England) | James Wade | 6 | 1 |
| 5 | (Scotland) | Gary Anderson | 4 | 0 |
| 5 | (England) | Phil Taylor | 6 | 1 |
