= William Rees (veterinary surgeon) =

British veterinarian (1928–2018)

William Howard Guest Rees CB (21 May 1928 – 20 January 2018) was the Chief Veterinary Officer of the United Kingdom from August 1980 to May 1988.

Rees was born in Llanelli and attended the Royal Veterinary College, qualifying as a vet in 1951. He worked as a MAFF Veterinary Officer from 1953 to 1980. He became Chief Veterinary Officer in 1980, dealing with issues of salmonella in eggs and bovine spongiform encephalopathy in cattle. After retirement in 1988, he became president of the World Organisation for Animal Health animal health code commission. He was appointed a Companion of the Order of the Bath in the 1988 New Year Honours.
