= Cranswick plc =

British food producer

- Formerly: Cranswick Mill Group p.l.c. (1972–1991)
- Type: Public
- Traded as: LSE: CWK; FTSE 250 component
- ISIN: GB0002318888
- Industry: Food
- Founded: 1972
- Headquarters: Hull, England
- Key people: Tim Smith (Chairman); Adam Couch (CEO)
- Revenue: ▲£2,982.5 million (2026)
- Operating income: ▲£232.8 million (2026)
- Net income: ▲£158.3 million (2026)
- Number of employees: 16,000 (2026)
- Website: cranswick.plc.uk

Cranswick plc is a United Kingdom food producer and supplier of premium, fresh, and added-value food products. The company is listed on the London Stock Exchange and is a constituent of the FTSE 250 Index.

== History ==
Cranswick was founded by Jim Bloom, Mike Field and 21 other East Riding of Yorkshire farmers producing pig feed under the name Cranswick Mill in 1972. The company subsequently diversified into food production. It was first listed on the London Stock Exchange in 1985.

The company began diversifying in 1988, when it bought a pork butchery business and an abattoir business. Cranswick diversified into pet products with the purchase of bird-seed producer George Buckton in 1993 and Tropical Marine Centre, a leading supplier of live tropical fish and invertebrates, in 1995. In 2009, the company sold its pet and pet products businesses.

In 1995, the company incorporated Cranswick Gourmet Sausage Company, and in 1998 acquired Mr Lazenby's, another premium sausage maker.

In 2007, Cranswick sold Cranswick Mill, its original business, as the pig-feed business had become less profitable over time, and the company focused on prepared foods instead.

The company moved back to breeding and rearing its own British pigs after acquiring East Anglian Pigs Limited and livestock and assets from Dent Ltd in 2013. By 2025, it had nearly one million pigs and more than 500 farms supplying pigs and chickens to its production facilities.

Cranswick has continued to develop through a combination of acquisitions and subsequent organic growth, enabling the company to build upon its philosophy of working with artisan producers to provide premium, market leading products to a much wider audience. As of 2026, the company serves its customers from 23 production facilities across the UK.

The company returned to livestock-feed milling in 2016 with the purchase of CCL Holdings, which included Crown Chicken and Crown Milling. As of 2026, Cranswick has pig- and poultry-feed milling operations in Norfolk, Suffolk, Yorkshire, and Lincolnshire.

In July 2016, the company announced it had sold The Sandwich Factory Holdings Ltd for £15 million to Greencore.

In 2021, Cranswick acquired two small plant-based food businesses for £6.4 million, Ramona's Kitchen and Atlantica UK, to expand its non-meat product range in a fast-growing sector.

In 2022 the company re-entered the pet food market with the acquisition of Grove Pet Foods, a dog-food manufacturer, and in 2023 Cranswick entered into a partnership with Pets at Home to supply that company with dog kibble.

== Acquisitions ==
- 1988: Pork Cuts, a pork butchery business
- 1988: R. W. Charter & Son, an abattoir business
- 1992: FT Sutton & Son, a manufacturer of cooked meats and fresh pork products
- 1993: George Buckton & Sons, a producer of bird seed
- 1995: Tropical Marine Centre, a supplier of live tropical fish and invertebrates
- 1998: Mr Lazenby's, a sausage manufacturer
- 1999: Pethick & Co., a producer of hams and other delicatessen meats for supermarket chains and other large customers
- 2001: Continental Fine Foods
- 2003: The Sandwich Factory
- 2005: Perkins Chilled Foods
- 2006: Delico, a cooked meats producer
- 2009: Bowes of Norfolk
- 2012: Kingston Foods, a cooked meats business
- 2013: East Anglian Pigs and Dent, pig rearing businesses
- 2014: Benson Park, a premium cooked poultry business
- 2016: CCL Holdings (Crown Chicken and Crown Milling), a leading integrated poultry producer
- 2016: Dunbia Ballymena, a leading Northern Irish pork processing business
- 2019: Katsouris Brothers, a London-based Mediterranean food producer
- 2021: Ramona's Kitchen, a manufacturer of plant-based dips and Mediterranean foods
- 2021: Atlantica UK, an importer of continental produce
- 2022: Grove Pet Foods, a dog-food manufacturer
- 2024: Froch Foods, a Leeds-based pork and poultry added value processor
- 2025: JSR Genetics, a pig genetics company
- 2025: Blakemans, a sausage manufacturer for the food-service industry

== Products ==
Cranswick produces fresh pork and chicken, gourmet sausages, cooked meat, gourmet bacon and gammon, premium cooked poultry, charcuterie, sandwiches, gourmet pastry products, and houmous and dips. It also produces pet foods.

The company's brands include Ramona's, Cypressa, and Bodega, and the pet food brands Vitalin and Alpha Feeds.

Cranswick's core market is the UK but the company has a rapidly developing export business serving the European, United States, and South East Asian markets.

== Animal abuse issues ==
In March 2023, a Warwickshire farm rearing pigs for Cranswick gained media attention after video emerged showing pigs living in squalor and others being left for hours to die; footage showed bins filled with dead pigs and a pig being cannibalised.

In April 2024, footage emerged from a Cranswick abbatoir in Norfolk showing workers hitting pigs in the face and back with a paddle before they entered a carbon dioxide gas chamber; protesters occupied the site later that week.

In May 2025, undercover filming at a Lincolnshire pig farm owned by the company showed numerous examples of cruelty including piglets being killed by being grabbed by their hind legs and smashed on to the floor. Cranswick stopped using the farm that same month, after the footage emerged.

In August 2025, undercover footage filmed between May 2024 and January 2025 at another Cranswick facility in Lincolnshire emerged, documenting pigs being struck with force and a piglet left to be cannibalised.

In November 2025, following an independent veterinary-led review into Cranswick's animal welfare standards, its board of directors committed to a new six-point plan to raise animal welfare standards across all Cranswick-run pig farms, and the company committed a £40 million investment to improve farm practices.
