= Caroline Drummond =

British environmental executive

- Born: 24 June 1963
- Died: 23 May 2022
- Occupations: Business executive, agricultural scientist
- Awards: Member of the Order of the British Empire (2009); Fellow of the Royal Society of Biology; Ecological Engagement Award (2009)

Caroline Jane Drummond (24 June 1963 – 23 May 2022) was a British environmental executive and agriculturalist, founder and CEO of the global charity LEAF (Linking Environment and Farming), and a Fellow of the Royal Agricultural Societies (FRAgS) and the Royal Society of Biology.

For her work in sustainable farming and food production, and her contributions to agriculture, Drummond was recognized by Queen Elizabeth II as a ‘Pioneer for Life of the Nation’ (2003) and awarded an MBE (2009). She was also awarded the Ecological Engagement Award of the British Ecological Society in 2009. Drummond received the inaugural British Farming Award for Outstanding Contribution to British Agriculture (2017) and a RASE National Agricultural Award (2018). In 2019, she was named one of the Women of the Decade at the Women Economic Forum in New Delhi, India.

== Early life and education ==
Caroline Jane Drummond, sometimes known as "CD", was born on 24 June 1963, in Fareham, Hampshire, England. Her parents were Lt Cdr Geoffrey Drummond (Royal Navy) and his wife Sally Spencer. As a teenager, Caroline was interested in becoming a veterinarian, and worked on local farms.

Drummond boarded at St Swithun's School, Winchester, before attending Seale-Hayne College. While a college student, she was part of a musical group, "CD and the Sensations". At one point they performed in support of Kid Creole and the Coconuts.

Drummond obtained her degree in agriculture from Seale-Hayne in 1986. She travelled for year in Nepal, Australia and the United States before being recruited by Management Development Services, a company working with the food industry.

== Career ==
In 1989 Drummond became an agronomy lecturer at Shuttleworth College in Bedfordshire, where she also taught forklift truck driving.

Drummond was a founder of LEAF (Linking Environment and Farming), established in 1991. LEAF’s mission is “To inspire and enable sustainable farming that is prosperous, enriches the environment and engages local communities”. Initially hired as a project co-ordinator, Drummond became LEAF's chief executive. Under her leadership the organization became a global charity, whose educational work and demonstration farms showcase best practices in farming.

In 1998 Drummond married Philip Ward, a dairy farmer based in Liskeard, Cornwall, with whom she has a daughter, Gabrielle. For her work, Drummond travelled extensively throughout the United Kingdom and overseas, commuting from Liskeard to London and the LEAF headquarters near Kenilworth.

In 2002, Drummond launched "LEAF Marque", a UK-based farm assurance program for labelling fresh produce, meat and crops that meet environmental and agricultural quality standards. LEAF Marque labelling was first adopted by Waitrose in 2007, and was adopted globally by Tesco in 2021. As of 2022, 48% of the fresh fruit and vegetables produced in the United Kingdom was LEAF Marque certified; the system was used in 19 countries.

In 2006, Drummond organized the first UK "Open Farm Sunday", in which farmers can be visited by the public, to learn more about the food they eat and how it is produced. The event has been attended by over a quarter of a million people a year.

Drummond was an advocate for integrated farm management and environmentally friendly farming. She is credited as having made a significant impact on Britain’s farming policy, by encouraging environmental responsibility, combining conservation methods and modern farming, and educating the public about the farm.

Caroline Jane Drummond died on 23 May 2022. LEAF established the Caroline Drummond Scholarship for Innovation in Sustainability in her memory, with an inaugural year of 2024. In 2023, the Institute of Agricultural Management also presented its first award in her honor, the Caroline Drummond Celebrating and Communicating Farming Excellence Award.

== Awards and honors ==
- Fellow of the Royal Agricultural Societies (FRAgS)
- Fellow of the Institute of Agricultural Management (FIAgrM)
- Fellow of the Royal Society of Biology
- 2003, ‘Pioneer for Life of the Nation’, Queen Elizabeth II
- 2009, Member of the Most Excellent Order of the British Empire
- 2009, Chartered Environmentalist (CEnv) registration, Society for the Environment
- 2009, Ecological Engagement Award, British Ecological Society
- 2010, Fellow of the Royal Society (FRSA)
- 2013, Nuffield Arden research scholar, Nuffield Farming Scholarships Trust
- 2014, Honorary Fellow, Society for the Environment (HonFSE)
- 2017, inaugural British Farming Award for Outstanding Contribution to British Agriculture
- 2018, National Agricultural Award, Royal Agricultural Society of England (RASE).
- 2018, Honorary Fellowship, Royal Agricultural University (RAU)
- 2019, Lifetime Achievement Award, Farmers’ Weekly
- 2019, Women of the Decade, Women Economic Forum (WEF), New Delhi, India
- 2021, Nuffield Farming Frank Arden Leadership Award, Nuffield Farming Scholarships Trust

== Selected publications ==
- Drummond, Caroline J. (2006). Integrated farming : principles and progress of good agricultural practice. York : International Fertiliser Society. ISBN 978-0-85310-215-1.
- Drummond, Caroline J. (2014). What can farmers learn from science to improve the nutritional value of our food? : Health by Stealth (PDF). Nuffield Farming Scholarships Trust Arden Report.
