= Nigel Gibbens =

British veterinarian and civil servant (born 1958)

Nigel Paul Gibbens CBE

Chief Veterinary Officer of the UK
- Former
- In office 2008–2018

Personal details
- Born: 1 March 1958 (age 68)
- Occupation: Veterinarian, government advisor

Nigel Paul Gibbens CBE (born 1 March 1958) is a British veterinarian and civil servant. He was the United Kingdom's Chief Veterinary Officer from May 2008 to March 2018. In 2020, he was on the Trade and Agriculture Commission as well as chair of The Working Group of the British Veterinary Association.

== Early life and education ==
Gibbens was born on 1 March 1958 in Dover, Kent, England. He studied at the Royal Veterinary College, graduating with a Bachelor of Veterinary Medicine degree in 1981. He then earned a master's degree in Tropical Veterinary Medicine at the University of Edinburgh.

== Career ==
=== Early career (1980s-2007) ===
He holds an honorary professorship from the Royal Veterinary College. Early in his career, in worked in private practice, and also veterinary services in Belize and Yemen. He joined the UK government in 1990. Prior to 2008, he had roles in the State Veterinary Service, and policy roles in international trade, BSE controls, and other roles for Defra's Food and Farming Group.

=== UK Chief Veterinary Officer (2008-2018) ===
On 21 May 2008, Gibbens became the Chief Veterinary Officer (CVO) of the United Kingdom and for the Department for Environment, Food and Rural Affairs (Defra). Ultimately, he was the UK's Chief Veterinary Officer from May 2008 to March 2018.

As CVO, Gibbens was supportive of the culling of badgers in an attempt to control the spread of bovine tuberculosis, describing the practice as "the best available option". He supported the controversial culls in 2013, which was ongoing in 2016.

In December 2016, he announced Avian Influenza Prevention Zones for Great Britain, declaring a "prevention zone" for England to limit the spread of bird flu, requiring commercial and individual bird keepers to keep their birds inside for 30 days, or take steps to separate them from wild birds. The order was texted to poultry farmers. In December 2017, he spoke against several UK supermarkets' proposal to ban the sale of eggs from caged hens, arguing "colony cages" helped protect flocks from bird flu. Afterwards, other vets wrote a letter to The Times calling the statement "disappointing" concerning animal welfare, saying there were ways to handle bird flu without caging. At the time, Gibbens advised the Department of Environment, Food and Rural Affairs.

He was succeeded as the UK's Chief Veterinary Officer by Christine Middlemiss in December 2017, stepping down at the end of February 2018 after having served as CVO for ten years.

=== Recent positions (2019-present) ===
In 2019, Gibbens joined a committee set up to advise the Brazilian chicken trade body, ABPA, on European consumers. It held its first meeting on 1 July 2019. In 2020, he was named to the newly formed Trade and Agriculture Commission in the UK, as the only veterinarian out of 16 members. As of 2020, he also chaired The Working Group of the British Veterinary Association. He is a member of the RUMA Independent Scientific Group.

== Honours ==
He was appointed Commander of the Order of the British Empire in the 2016 New Year Honours.

== See also ==
- Agriculture and Trade Commission
