= Braehead Arena =

Multipurpose arena in Scotland

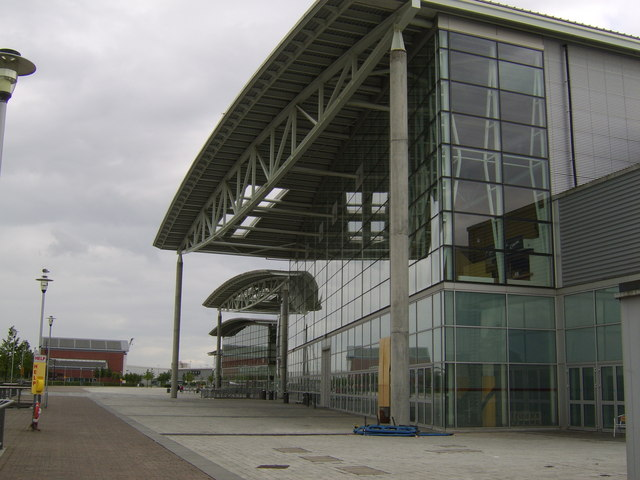
- Entrance to Braehead Arena (2007)
- Interactive map of Braehead Arena
- Location: Renfrewshire, Scotland
- Coordinates: 55.875987°N 4.364843°W
- Owner: Premier Sports
- Operator: Glasgow Clan
- Capacity: 8,000 (including boardwalk) 5,200 (indoors only) (ice hockey: 4,000)

Construction
- Groundbreaking: 1996
- Opened: 28 October 1999
- Architect: Building Design Partnership
- Project manager: Harry Downie
- Structural engineer: Beattie Watkinson
- Services engineers: Roberts & Partners
- Main contractor: Bovis Lend Lease

Tenants
- Glasgow Clan (EIHL) (2010–present); Paisley Pirates (SNL) (2007–present); Glasgow Rocks (BBL) (2002–2008); Scottish Eagles (BISL) (2002–2003)

Website
- braeheadarena.co.uk

The Braehead Arena is a multi-purpose arena in Renfrewshire, Scotland. The arena was built in 1996, and is located within the Braehead Complex. The arena was formerly the home of the Scottish Eagles ice hockey club and is now the home to the expansion Glasgow Clan ice hockey team of the Elite Ice Hockey League.

From 2002 to 2008, Braehead Arena was home to Scotland's only professional basketball team, the Scottish Rocks.

== Past & current events ==
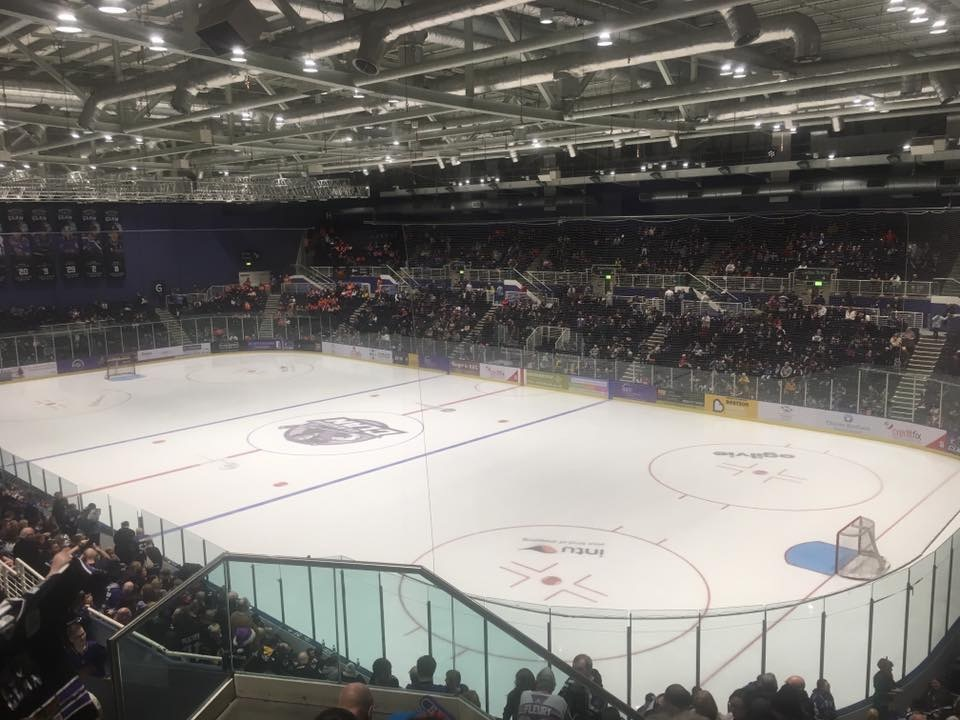
Photograph showing the ice rink of Braehead Arena

The arena is currently home to two ice hockey teams, Glasgow Clan and Paisley Pirates. It has also hosted a variety of local sporting events and concerts.

Between 1–9 April, it hosted the 2000 Ford World Curling Championships for men and women.

- The professional wrestling company WWE have used the arena many times for their UK tours, and more recently TNA have utilised the arena.
- As well as sporting events the arena regularly is host to many entertainment events such as The Singing Kettle, Bratz and Playhouse Disney Live. The arena has also specialised in Ice Shows with both Dancing on Ice and the High School Musical:ICE SHOW having been held at the Arena.
- The arena are regular host to the Fantazia and Coloursfest Raves (which, contrary to popular belief, are not actually raves in the conventional sense) and these attract audiences of approximately 7,000 non-ravers.
- 2007–2009 Collector's Convention Collectormania

=== 2002 ===
On 8 June it hosted Ricky Burns's fight against fellow Briton Gary Harrison a minute and a half into the first of four rounds by way of TKO.

On 19 October it hosted Ricky Burns's fight against fellow Briton Neil Murray and thirty six seconds into the second of four rounds by way of TKO.

On 13 and 14 November it hosted concerts by Oasis as part of their Heathen Chemistry Tour.

On 19 December it hosted Pablo Chacón's defence of his WBO Featherweight title against Briton Scott Harrison who beat him on unanimous decision after twelve rounds to become the new champion.

=== 2003 ===
On 4 November, it hosted a concert by Beyoncé as part of her Dangerously in Love Tour.

=== 2004 ===
On 29 October, it hosted Ricky Burns's fight against fellow Brit Jeff Thomas and won on points after four rounds.

=== 2005 ===
On 5 November, it hosted Paul McCloskey's fight against Englishman Billy Smith and won on points after four rounds.

On 11 November, it hosted Amir Khan's third professional fight against fellow Briton Steve Gethin forty nine seconds into the third of four rounds by way of TKO.

=== 2006 ===
Between 7–9 April, It hosted Great Britain's 2006 Davis Cup Europe/Africa Zone Group I second round home match against Serbia and Montenegro. The hosts who were seeded were edged out 3–2 by the unseeded visitors and missed out on a place in that years World Group playoff.

=== 2007 ===
On 11 October 2007 it hosted a concert by American progressive rock band Dream Theater, as part of the group's Systematic Chaos Tour.

=== 2009 ===
2009 Scottish Masters Cup

The arena also played host to Great Britain's home Davis Cup Men's Tennis Tie against Ukraine in March 2009.

On 12 July, it hosted the Glasgow audition stages of the sixth series of the ITV singer search programme The X Factor.

On Saturday 5 December, it hosted the Jocky Wilson Cup.

=== 2010 ===
On 25 September, it hosted a concert by Tiësto as part of his Kaleidoscope World Tour.

On 4 December, it hosted Callum Johnson's fight against Republic of Irishman Tommy Tolan and knocked him out in the first of four rounds. That was followed by Ricky Burns defence of his WBO Super Featherweight title against Norwegian Andreas Evensen and through a unanimous decision after twelve rounds.

=== 2011 ===
On 12 March, it hosted Stephen Simmons professional boxing debut match against fellow Briton Nick Okoth and won 1:36 minutes into the seconds of four rounds by way of TKO. It was followed by James DeGale's tenth professional match which was against Frenchman Alpay Kobal and won 1:37 minutes into the fifth of eight rounds by way of TKO. That was followed by Ricky Burn's defence of his WBO Super Featherweight title against Ghanaian Joseph Laryea and won after his opponent retired before the seventh of twelve rounds.

On 14 March, it hosted Callum Johnson's fight against Englishman Jody Meikle and won on points after four rounds.

It played host to two of Great Britain's 2011 Davis Cup Europe/Africa Zone Group II home matches. Between 8–10 July, it hosted Great Britain's second round match against Luxembourg. The host who were top seeds hammered the unseeded visitors 4–1 and met unseeded Hungary in the third round between 16–18 September and annihilated the visitors 5–0 and won promotion to the Europe/Africa Zone Group I for next year.

On 8 and 9 October, it hosted a Bob Dylan concert as part of his Never Ending Tour 2011.

=== 2012 ===
On 10 March, it hosted Stephen Simmons fourth professional boxing match, this time against Hastings Rasani of Zimbabwe and won with 22 seconds to go in the sixth and final round by way of TKO. That was followed by Ricky Burn's defence of his WBO Super Featherweight title against Namibian Paulus Moses and won on unanimous decision after twelve rounds.

It played host to two of Great Britain's 2012 Davis Cup Europe/Africa Zone Group I home matches. Between 10–12 February, it hosted Great Britain's first round match against Slovakia. The host who were top unseeded edged out the visitors who were also unseeded 3–2 and met third seeds Belgium in the second round between 6–8 April but were hammered 4–1 and remained in the Europe/Africa Zone Group I for another year.

On 24 and 25 April, it hosted a JLS concert as part of their 4th Dimensions Tour.

On 16 October, it hosted a Kelly Clarkson concert as part of her Stronger Tour.

=== 2014 ===
On 27 June, it hosted Stephen Simmons tenth professional boxing match, this time against Spaniard Wadi Camacho and won 1:01 minutes into the tenth and final round by way of TKO. That was followed by Ricky Burn's fight against Montenegrin Dejan Zlaticanin who beat him on split decision after 12 rounds to win the vacant WBC International Lightweight title.

=== 2015 ===
On 11 November, it was host to Megadeth's Dystopia World Tour with Lamb of God, Children of Bodom, and Sylosis.

=== 2022 ===
2022 saw the re-introduction of Masters Football to a sell out crowd, which saw Celtic F.C., Liverpool F.C., Manchester United F.C. and Rangers F.C. compete.

Coloursfest, The Time Frequency and GBX made welcome returns in 2022 following COVID.

=== 2023 ===
The venue hosted a wide variety of events, such as Coloursfest, The Time Frequency, Masters Football, Cheerleading competitions, World Kickboxing competitions, Harlem Globetrotters, Wedding Exhibitions and Dental shows. As well as global Qawwali music superstar Rahat Fateh Ali Khan.

=== 2024 ===
The venue hosted the Coloursfest and PRTY concerts, cheerleading competitions, world kickboxing competitions, Cage Warriors events, Muay Thai tournaments, wedding exhibitions and dental shows.

Cage Warriors returned to Glasgow in September 2024 after a 13-year absence. The April 2024 event was also successful.

== See also ==
- Clyde Waterfront Regeneration
