= Sheila Voas =

Chief Veterinary Officer of Scotland

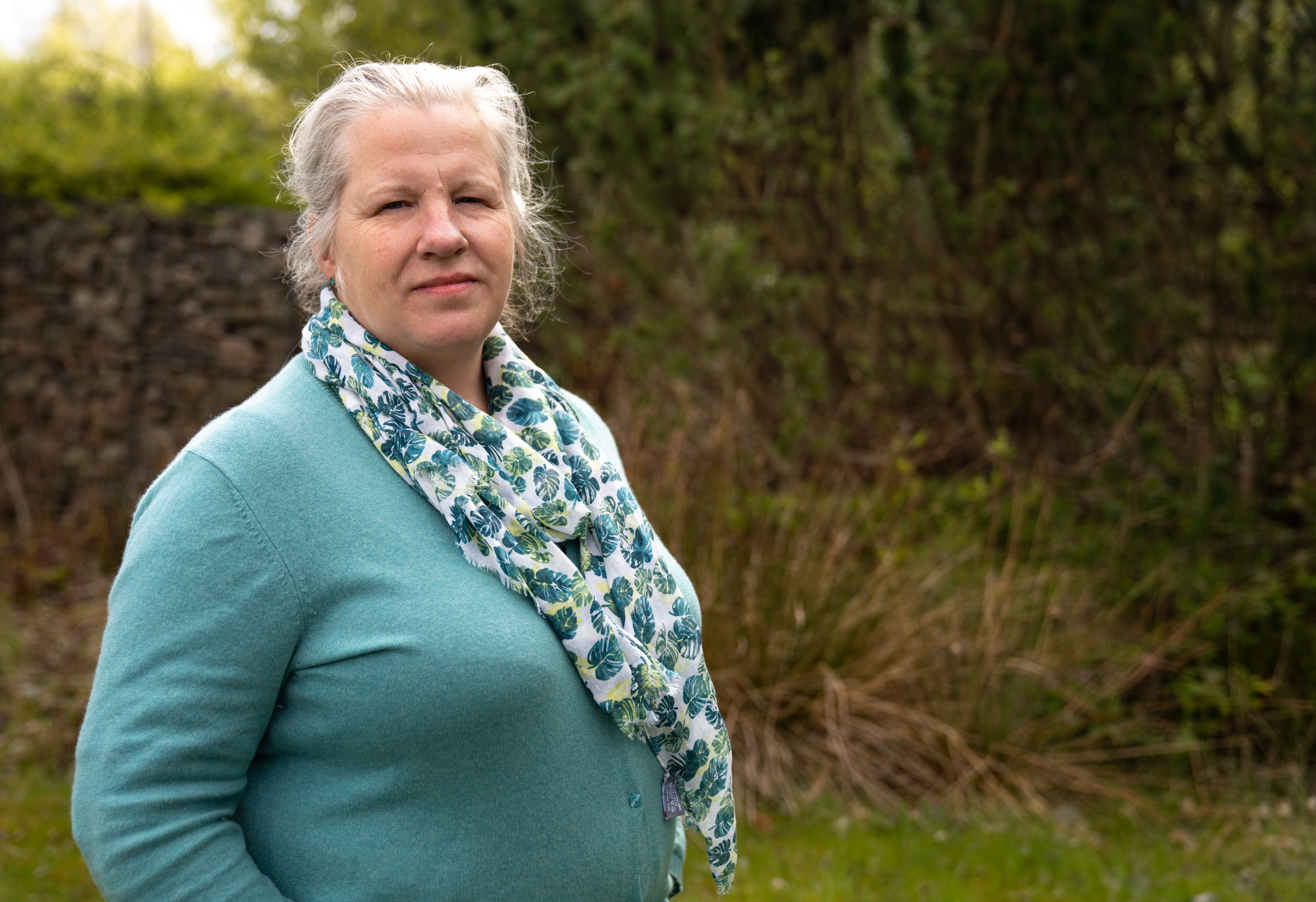
- Voas in 2022
- Education: Royal (Dick) School of Veterinary Studies (BVM&S)
- Occupation: veterinary surgeon
- Years active: 1988–present

Chief Veterinary Officer at Scotland
- In office 2012–present

Sheila Voas is a veterinary surgeon and the Chief Veterinary Officer of Scotland since 2012.

== Biography ==
Voas attended Kings Park Primary School and Dalkeith High School in Midlothian, Scotland, graduating at the latter in 1983.

Sheila attended the Royal (Dick) School of Veterinary Studies at University of Edinburgh, getting her BVM&S qualification in 1988. She worked in a mixed practice for two years at Driffield, East Yorkshire and then moved to the Scottish Borders area in Scotland where she had mixed practice roles, also in Biggar and Peebles.

Voas joined the Scottish Government as a veterinary advisor. (Note: According to her Scottish Government profile, Voas joined in 2007, but her LinkedIn profile and Vet Times articles state that she joined in 2004.) She later became the deputy CVO. (Note: According to Vet Times, she became deputy CVO in 2010, but her article in Veterinary Woman indicates 2009.) In June 2011, following the departure of incumbent Simon Hall, she became the acting CVO of Scotland, and in October 2012, was appointed permanently for the position.

== Honours and awards ==
In 2018, Voas was awarded an Associate membership with the Royal Agricultural Societies (ARAgS).

In 2019, she was awarded an honorary fellowship from the Moredun Research Institute for services to livestock health and welfare in Scotland.

She was awarded a Fellowship in the Royal College of Veterinary Surgeons (FRCVS) for "Meritorious Contribution to the Veterinary Profession" in 2020.

== Personal life ==
Voas is married and has two sons. They live in the Scottish Borders near Blyth Bridge. She also owns three cats and a horse.
