= Keith Meldrum =

British veterinarian (born 1937)

Keith Meldrum CB, MRCVS, DVSM, HonFRSH
- Born: Keith Cameron Meldrum; 1937 (age 88–89)
- Occupations: Veterinary surgeon; UK Chief Veterinary Officer

Keith Cameron Meldrum CB, MRCVS, DVSM, HonFRSH (born 1937) was the United Kingdom's Chief Veterinary Officer from June 1988 to April 1997.

== Biography ==
After two years in general practice as a veterinary surgeon, he joined the State Veterinary Service, as a veterinary officer, and worked there during the 1967 foot-and-mouth outbreak. His tenure as CVO coincided with the Bovine spongiform encephalopathy (BSE) epidemic, to which he led the government's response.

A lifetime member of the British Veterinary Association, he sits on the council of their Central Veterinary Society division. He was made a Companion of The Most Honourable Order of the Bath (CB) in the 1995 New Year Honours. He is also an Honorary Member of the Royal Society for Public Health (HonFRSH), a Member of the Royal College of Veterinary Surgeons (MRCVS), and holds a Diploma in Veterinary State Medicine (DVSM).
