= 4th Dimensions Tour =

2012 concert tour by JLS

JLS Arena Tour
- Tour by JLS
- The 4th Dimension Tour
- Location: United Kingdom; Ireland
- Associated album: Jukebox
- Start date: 14 March 2012
- End date: 6 September 2012
- Legs: 2
- No. of shows: 40

JLS concert chronology
- JLS Tour (2010–11); 4th Dimension Tour (2012)

The 4th Dimension Tour was the concert tour by British boy band JLS. The tour supported their third studio album Jukebox which was released on 14 November 2011. The tour visited Ireland and the United Kingdom.

== Background ==
The tour was officially announced via the band's website on 2 September 2011, with UK arena dates only being announced. Irish dates were later announced on 9 September. Beginning in Liverpool's Echo Arena on 15 March, JLS will visit cities across the UK and Ireland throughout March and April 2012. Tickets for the tour went on sale on 9 September with shows selling out resulting in extra shows being added across the UK. Six extra dates were later added on 14 September. On 28 September, three extra shows were announced for London's O2 Arena, Manchester Arena and Glasgow's Braehead Arena. A matinee show was added at The O2 Arena in London on 24 March with proceeds going to Sport Relief.

The support acts for the tour were NVS, Starboy Nathan and Vida, a new girl group managed by Oritsé Williams from the band. Vida also performed at 24 March Sport Relief matinee show, alongside Olly Murs and Rizzle Kicks who were special guests for that show only. Highlights of theirs and JLS' performance were filmed and broadcast the same day on BBC Three in a show entitled JLS Sing for Sport Relief.

== Setlist ==
1. "Take You Down"
2. "The Club Is Alive"
3. "Teach Me How to Dance"
4. "Take a Chance on Me"
5. "Beat Again"
6. "3D"
7. "One Shot"
8. "So Many Girls"
9. "Earthquake" (Labrinth cover)
10. "Outta This World"
11. "Eyes Wide Shut"
12. "Go Harder"
13. "Everybody in Love"
14. "Yeah 3x" / "Beautiful People" (Chris Brown covers)
15. "OMG" / "DJ Got Us Fallin in Love" (Usher covers)
16. "Love You More"
17. "That's My Girl"
18. "She Makes Me Wanna"
  Encore
19. "Proud"
20. "Do You Feel What I Feel?"

== Tour dates ==
Date	City	Country	Venue
Europe (First Leg)
14 March 2012	Liverpool	England	Echo Arena
15 March 2012	Liverpool	England	Echo Arena
16 March 2012	Birmingham	England	LG Arena
17 March 2012	Birmingham	England	LG Arena
19 March 2012	Cardiff	Wales	Motorpoint Arena Cardiff
20 March 2012	Cardiff	Wales	Motorpoint Arena Cardiff
21 March 2012	Cardiff	Wales	Motorpoint Arena Cardiff
23 March 2012	London	England	The O_{2} Arena
24 March 2012^{[A]}	London	England	The O_{2} Arena
25 March 2012	London	England	The O_{2} Arena
27 March 2012	Nottingham	England	Capital FM Arena
28 March 2012	Sheffield	England	Motorpoint Arena Sheffield
30 March 2012	Manchester	England	Manchester Arena
31 March 2012	Manchester	England	Manchester Arena
1 April 2012	Newcastle	England	Metro Radio Arena
3 April 2012	Aberdeen	Scotland	Aberdeen Exhibition and Conference Centre
4 April 2012	Glasgow	Scotland	Scottish Exhibition and Conference Centre
5 April 2012	Glasgow	Scotland	Scottish Exhibition and Conference Centre
7 April 2012	Belfast	Northern Ireland	Odyssey Arena
8 April 2012	Belfast	Northern Ireland	Odyssey Arena
9 April 2012	Dublin	Ireland	The O_{2}
17 April 2012	Birmingham	England	LG Arena
18 April 2012	Nottingham	England	Capital FM Arena
20 April 2012	Manchester	England	Manchester Arena
21 April 2012	London	England	The O_{2} Arena
22 April 2012	Cardiff	Wales	Motorpoint Arena Cardiff
24 April 2012	Glasgow	Scotland	Braehead Arena
25 April 2012	Glasgow	Scotland	Braehead Arena
27 April 2012	Newcastle	England	Metro Radio Arena
28 April 2012	Sheffield	England	Motorpoint Arena Sheffield
Europe (Second Leg)
7 June 2012^{[B]}	London	England	Royal Albert Hall
18 August 2012	Scarborough	England	Scarborough Open Air Theatre
19 August 2012^{[C]}	Oxford	England	South Park
23 August 2012^{[C]}	Inverness	Scotland	North Meeting Park
25 August 2012^{[C]}	Carlisle	England	Carlisle Castle
26 August 2012^{[C]}	Ipswich	England	Chantry Park
27 August 2012^{[C]}	Hove	England	The Probiz County Ground
1 September 2012^{[C]}	Exeter	England	Powderham Castle
2 September 2012^{[C]}	Lincoln	England	County Showground
6 September 2012^{[D]}	London	England	The Roundhouse

Festivals and other miscellaneous performances
^{A} JLS performed two shows that day.
^{B} This concert was a part of "Rays of Sunshine Concert"
^{C} This concert was a part of "Sound City Festival"
^{D} This concert was a part of "iTunes Festival"

Cancelled performances
The SoundCity festival dates for Inverness and Carlisle were cancelled due to a hectic schedule for JLS

=== Box office score data ===
Venue	City	Tickets sold / available	Gross revenue
Manchester Arena	Manchester	37,962 / 39,877 (95%)	$1,933,961
The O_{2} Arena	London	71,665 / 76,892 (93%)	$3,541,830
TOTAL		99,506 / 105,788 (94%)	$4,955,110
