= Chief Veterinary Officer (United Kingdom) =

British government official

The Chief Veterinary Officer (CVO) is an official in the British government, who is head of veterinary services in the United Kingdom. Wales, Scotland and Northern Ireland also each have a Chief Veterinary Officer.

== List of post holders for the United Kingdom ==
The following people have held the post of Chief Veterinary Officer for the United Kingdom:

- Alexander Curtis Cope, 1893–1905
- Sir Stewart Stockman, 1905–1926
- Sir James Joseph Ralph Jackson, 1926–1932
- Sir Percy John Luxton Kelland, 1932–1938
- Sir Daniel Alfred Edmond Cabot, 1938–1948
- Sir Thomas Dalling, 1948–1952
- Sir John Neish Ritchie, 1952–1965
- John Reid, 1965–1970
- A G Beynon, 1970–1973
- Alexander Cosens Lindsay Brown, 1973–1980
- William Howard Rees, August 1980 – May 1988
- Keith Meldrum, June 1988 – April 1997
- James Scudamore, April 1997 – March 2004
- Dr Debby Reynolds, March 2004 – November 2007
- Fred Landeg, November 2007 – May 2008 (acting CVO prior to full appointment)
- Nigel Gibbens, 21 May 2008 – 28 February 2018
- Christine Middlemiss, 1 March 2018 – present

== List of post holders for Wales ==
- Dr Christianne Glossop, June 2005 – October 2022
- Dr Richard Irvine, March 2023 – Present

== List of post holders for Scotland ==
The Scottish post was created in October 2002, and the following people have held the post:

- Leslie Gardner, October 2002 – March 2003
- Charles Milne, March 2003 – June 2009
- Simon Hall, June 2009 – June 2011
- Sheila Voas, June 2011– present (acting CVO prior to full appointment in October 2012)

== List of post holders for Northern Ireland ==
- Dr Robert (Bob) Milligan McCracken, 1998–2002
- R M Houston, 2002–2013
- Robert J Huey, 2013–2024
- Brian Dooher, 2024-present
