= Marcel Escudier =

Marcel Escudier is Professor Emeritus of mechanical engineering of the School of Engineering at the University of Liverpool.

He became a Fellow of the Royal Academy of Engineering in 2000. Escudier is a fellow of the Institution of Mechanical Engineers and of the City and Guilds of London Institute.

As well as more than 60 papers published in scholarly journals, Escudier is the author of The Essence of Engineering Fluid Mechanics published by Prentice Hall Europe in 1998 and recently co-authored A Dictionary of Mechanical Engineering, published by Oxford University Press in 2013.
