= John Kelland (veterinarian) =

UK Chief Veterinary Officer 1931–1938

Sir John Kelland
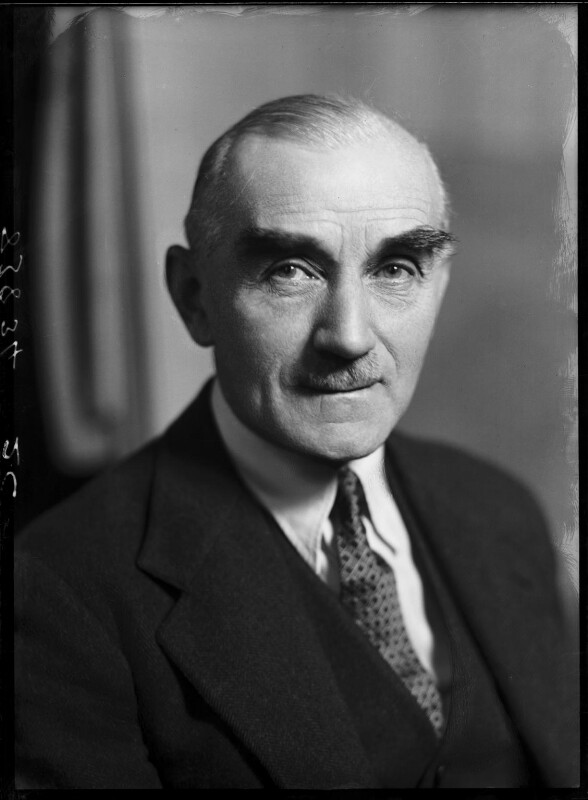
- Kelland in 1938
- Born: Percy John Luxton Kelland; 1 March 1878; South Molton
- Died: 24 September 1958 (aged 80); Isle of Wight, England, UK
- Citizenship: United Kingdom
- Education: Royal Veterinary College, London
- Occupation: Chief Veterinary Officer of the United Kingdom, 1932–1938
- Years active: 1901–1938
- Employer: Ministry of Agriculture, Fisheries and Food (United Kingdom)
- Organization: Government of the United Kingdom
- Known for: Veterinary medicine

Sir Percy John Luxton Kelland (1878–1958), known as Sir John Kelland, was the Chief Veterinary Officer in the Diseases of Animals Branch at the Ministry of Agriculture and Fisheries between 1932 and 1938.

Kelland oversaw government responses to bovine tuberculosis (TB), sheep scab, rabies, and foot-and-mouth disease (FMD). In 1937, King George VI made Kelland a Knight Bachelor.

== Early life and education ==
Kelland was born in Devon and attended Heavitree Collegiate School in Exeter.

Kelland studied at the Royal Veterinary College, London, and qualified as a veterinarian in 1901. In 1901, he began his career as a civil veterinary surgeon in the Army Veterinary Corps and served in South Africa during the Second Boer War.

== Career ==
Upon his return to England in 1902, Kelland joined the veterinary staff of the Ministry of Agriculture and Fisheries in the Diseases of Animals Branch as first Assistant Veterinary Inspector.

Kelland became Chief Superintending Inspector in 1924, Deputy Chief Veterinary Officer in 1926, and the Chief Veterinary Officer in August 1932. He succeeded Sir Ralph Jackson.

Kelland oversaw changes such as the Provisions of Agriculture Act 1937 and the State Veterinary Service (SVS) on 1 April 1938. The former combined local authority veterinary services with the central authority.

His centralisation sped up the deployment of staff in disease outbreaks such as foot-and-mouth and bovine TB.

Kelland's proposals formed part of the Diseases of Animals Act 1910 and the Exportation of Horses Act 1914.

He represented Great Britain on the Permanent Commission of the International Veterinary Congresses and the Office International des Epizooties (OIE).

When Kelland appeared on King George VI’s Coronation Honours list, the Veterinary Record claimed, “the initial enquiries which led to the discovery of rabies, in 1918, were made by Sir John” and that, “in addition to rabies, epizootic lymphangitis and glanders have been eradicated during the years 1902–1938 the span of Sir John’s service with the ministry”.

Kelland brought poultry into the Diseases of Animals Acts and Orders. His first order made Newcastle disease a scheduled disease. His second imposed import controls, and his third order legislated the disinfection of markets and vehicles used to sell and transport poultry.

The ministry scheduled Kelland's retirement from public service for March 1938. However, the ministry delayed Kelland's retirement until June 1938.

=== Attested Herds Scheme ===
Kelland based his Attested Herd scheme on the principle that one sick animal threatens the health of the other animals in its herd. He referred to this as his healthy herd principle.

He applied this principle to controlling bovine tuberculosis. Benefits to farmers with a clean (attested herd) included a bonus payment on their milk. Kelland did this to ensure the milk was from a herd free from bovine tuberculosis.

Kelland said he intended to carry this policy forward to poultry-breeding stations and control contagious abortion in cattle.

=== Foot-and-Mouth Disease ===
Kelland sat on the Foot-and-Mouth Disease Research Committee and was associated with the investigational aspect of the disease.

In 1919 Kelland, while acting as secretary of the FMD Disease Committee, conducted research into the disease on an isolated vessel off Harwich.

==== 1922–1924 outbreak ====
The ministry sent Kelland to Cheshire during the UK's 1922–23 foot-and-mouth disease outbreak. Kelland led Cheshire's disease control response and directed local operations.

==== 1930 serum trials ====
In 1930, Kelland's work at the Ministry of Agriculture and Fisheries involved experimenting with serum treatment believed to contain curative, if not preventive, qualities for FMD. Kelland viewed serum as a supplement, not a replacement for slaughter policies, as its use hindered early diagnosis and disease control.

==== 1937 outbreak ====
Kelland oversaw the ministry's response to the FMD outbreak in the South of England, this time controlling from London HQ.

In November 1937, Kelland placed a standstill order on three parts of East and South East England to check the spread of the FMD outbreak.

The standstill order was on cattle, sheep, and pigs over a large part of England, prohibiting movement from specified areas to outside.

== Legacy ==
=== Transportation of Horses and other Livestock ===
Kelland led an inquiry into how exporters shipped horses from the United Kingdom to mainland Europe for slaughter. The inquiry came after reports about the conditions under which exporters transported horses agitated public opinion on the matter.

Kelland's proposed measures formed part of the 1914 Exportation of Horses Act. Upon his death, The Times claimed, “the high standard of horses now exported from this country is largely attributable to his work on this matter.”

=== Family ===
His third wife was Evelyn Isolde Foxton Ferguson (1898–1952), daughter of Arthur Foxton Ferguson. His grandson is the British veterinarian Dr Andrew Higgins.

== Death ==
On Wednesday, 24 September 1958, Kelland died at his home on the Isle of Wight.

== Published works ==
- "The Eradication of Tuberculosis from a Commercial Dairy Herd", The Veterinary Journal (1900)

== Knighthood ==
King George VI made Kelland a Knight Bachelor in his 1937 Coronation Honours.
