= Beat Again Tour =

2021 concert tour by JLS

- Tour by JLS
- Start date: 20 October 2021
- End date: 29 November 2021

JLS concert chronology
- Goodbye: The Greatest Hits Tour (2013); Beat Again Tour (2021); Everybody Say JLS: The Hits Tour (2023)

The Beat Again Tour was a concert tour by JLS that took place from October to November 2021. It was their first tour since 2013.

== Setlist ==
This setlist is based on the O2 Arena show on 19 November.

1. The Club Is Alive
2. Do You Feel What I Feel
3. One Shot
4. Take a Chance on Me
5. Eyes Wide Shut
6. Only Tonight
7. Day One
8. Love You More
9. Private / Only Making Love / I Know What She Like / Better for You / So Many Girls
10. Close To You
11. Umbrella (Rihanna cover)

Interlude:

1. Close to You
2. Hottest Girl in the World
3. She Makes Me Wanna
4. Eternal Love
5. Beat Again

Encore:

1. Proud
2. Everybody in Love

== Tour dates ==
The dates were rescheduled from their original 2020 dates.

- Wed 20 Oct 2021 - Glasgow The SSE Hydro
- Thu 21 Oct 2021 - Glasgow The SSE Hydro
- Fri 22 Oct 2021 - Newcastle Utilita Arena
- Sat 23 Oct 2021 - Birmingham Resorts World Arena
- Mon 25 Oct 2021 - Cardiff Motorpoint Arena
- Tue 26 Oct 2021 - Cardiff Motorpoint Arena
- Thu 28 Oct 2021 - Sheffield FlyDSA Arena
- Fri 29 Oct 2021 - Sheffield FlyDSA Arena
- Sat 30 Oct 2021 - Leeds First Direct Arena
- Sun 31 Oct 2021 - Cardiff Motorpoint Arena
- Tue 2 Nov 2021 - Liverpool M&S Bank Arena
- Wed 3 Nov 2021 - Liverpool M&S Bank Arena
- Thu 4 Nov 2021 - London The O2
- Fri 5 Nov 2021 - London The O2
- Sat 6 Nov 2021 - Newcastle Utilita Arena
- Mon 8 Nov 2021 - Brighton Centre
- Tue 9 Nov 2021 - Bournemouth International Centre
- Wed 10 Nov 2021 - Hull Bonus Arena
- Sun 14 Nov 2021 – Belfast SSE Arena
- Mon 15 Nov 2021 – Dublin 3Arena
- Wed 17 Nov 2021 - Nottingham Motorpoint Arena
- Thu 18 Nov 2021 - Nottingham Motorpoint Arena
- Fri 19 Nov 2021 - London The O2
- Sat 20 Nov 2021 - London The O2
- Tue 23 Nov 2021 - Manchester AO Arena
- Wed 24 Nov 2021 - Manchester AO Arena
- Fri 26 Nov 2021 - Birmingham Resorts World Arena
- Sat 27 Nov 2021 - Birmingham Resorts World Arena
- Sat 27 Nov 2021 - Birmingham Resorts World Arena

== Reviews ==
Renowned For Sound gave a positive review. Manchester Evening News gave five stars.
