= Everybody Say JLS: The Hits Tour =

2023 concert tour by JLS

- Tour by JLS
- Start date: October 20, 2023
- End date: November 11, 2023

JLS concert chronology
- Beat Again Tour (2021); Everybody Say JLS: The Hits Tour (2023); The Club is Alive: The 2025 Hits Tour (2025)

Everybody Say JLS: The Hits Tour is the sixth concert tour by JLS. It is their first tour since the Beat Again Tour in 2021.

The tour began at the 3Arena in Dublin on 20 October 2023.

== Background ==
The tour was being teased in February. It was officially announced in February 2023. The show will also feature a DJ segment.

In October 2023, the tour was extended to the summer of 2024.

== Setlist ==
This is based on the 20 October show.

1. Eyes Wide Shut
2. Hottest Girl in the World
3. Day One / Finesse
4. Do You Feel What I Feel
5. Eternal Love
6. One Shot
7. So Many Girls
8. Only Making Love
9. I Know What She Likes
10. Close to You
11. Only Tonight
12. Better for You
13. The Club Is Alive
14. DJ Set Megamix
15. She Makes Me Wanna
16. Beat Again
17. Love You More
18. Everybody in Love

== Tour dates ==
- October 20 - Dublin 3Arena
- October 21 - Belfast SSE Arena
- October 23 - Nottingham Motorpoint Arena
- October 24 - Bournemouth Bournemouth Int'nl Centre
- October 26 - Liverpool M&S Bank Arena
- October 27 - Birmingham Utilita Arena
- October 28 - Birmingham Utilita Arena
- October 30 - Cardiff Cardiff International Arena
- October 31 - Cardiff Cardiff International Arena
- November 2 - Manchester AO Arena
- November 3 - Glasgow OVO Hydro
- November 4 - Newcastle Utilita Arena
- November 6 - Brighton BRIGHTON Centre
- November 7 - Leeds first direct Arena
- November 9 - London O2
- November 10 - London O2
- November 11 - Sheffield Utilita Arena

Tour dates as of March 2023.

== Reviews ==
The Bournemouth Daily Echo gave a positive review.
