= Charlotte Howard =

Charlotte Howard may refer to:

- Charlotte Jemima Henrietta Maria FitzRoy (~1650-1684), Howard by marriage.
- Charlotte Fitzalan-Howard, Duchess of Norfolk (1788-1870), English aristocrat.
- Charli Howard (b. 1991), English fashion model
- Charlotte Howard, journalist and New York bureau chief at The Economist
