= JLS =

English R&B boy band

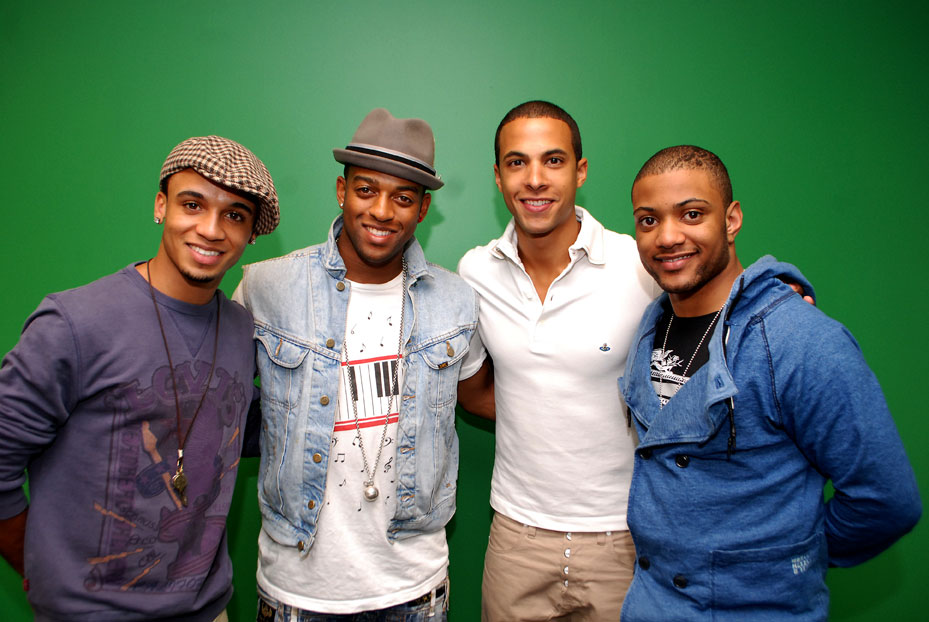
- JLS at KISS FM in Chicago in April 2010, from left to right: Merrygold, Williams, Humes, and Gill

Background information
- Also known as: UFO (2006–2008)
- Origin: London, England
- Genres: R&B; pop; hip hop; dance
- Years active: 2006–2013; 2020–present
- Labels: Epic; RCA; Jive; J; Sony; BMG
- Members: Aston Merrygold; Oritsé Williams; Marvin Humes; JB Gill
- Website: jlsofficial.com

JLS (initialism for Jack the Lad Swing) are a British boy band consisting of members Aston Merrygold, Oritsé Williams, Marvin Humes, and JB Gill; Williams formed the band. They initially signed with Tracklacers production company New Track City and were the runners-up of the fifth series of the ITV reality talent show The X Factor in 2008, coming in second to Alexandra Burke. After their appearance on The X Factor, JLS signed to Epic Records. Their first two singles "Beat Again" and "Everybody in Love" were both number one on the UK Singles Chart.

The band's self-titled debut album was released on 9 November 2009 and has since sold over 1.5 million copies in the UK. JLS won the awards for British Breakthrough and British Single ("Beat Again") at the 2010 BRIT Awards. They won several awards at the MOBO Awards for Best song for "Beat Again" in 2009 and also Best Newcomer in the same year. In 2010, they won the MOBO Awards for Best UK act and Best Album. They also won their fifth MOBO in 2012 by winning Best Video for "Do You Feel What I Feel?". They won the title of the UK's hardest-working band for two consecutive years, in 2011 and 2012.

In 2010, JLS signed a record deal with the US record label Jive Records and released "Everybody in Love" as their debut and only US single, but it failed to chart. "The Club Is Alive", the lead single from their second studio album, was released in the UK in July 2010 and earned the band their third number-one on the UK Singles Chart. Their single "Love You More" was the official single for Children in Need in 2010 and gave the group their fourth number-one single in the UK. Their single "She Makes Me Wanna" featuring Dev was their fifth UK number one. As of 2012, their debut album and single have been named one of The X Factor's top ten biggest-selling debut singles and albums. As of 2013, they were the 16th-richest reality TV stars in the UK, with an estimated fortune of £6 million per member, thus giving the band a financial worth of approximately £24 million.

In May 2013, after seven years together, JLS announced that they would go their separate ways after releasing a greatest hits album and one last UK and Ireland arena tour. In February 2020, the band announced a reunion, with the Beat Again Tour due to start in November 2020, but it was postponed to June 2021 due to the COVID-19 pandemic and then postponed to October 2021.

According to the British Phonographic Industry (BPI), JLS has sold 2.6 million albums and 3.8 million singles in the UK.

== Music career ==
=== 2006–2008: Formation as UFO ===
In 2006, Oritsé Williams decided to get into the music business mainly because his mother has multiple sclerosis and he wanted to raise money to help find a cure. He was originally scouted for a number of boy bands but did not feel they were right and believed that a group should have a "real" connection with each other like his heroes, the Four Tops. Williams decided to form his own boy band and later on in 2006, through friends, met Marvin Humes who had experience in R&B, pop and house music, being a part of VS in 2004. Next to join in late 2006/early 2007 was Aston Merrygold, who was once cast in the ITV children's programme Fun Song Factory, because of his athletic ability and his performative skills. Last to join the group in mid 2007 was JB Gill, for his "musical ear" and harmonies. They bonded, became friends and together they were called UFO (an initialism of Unique Famous Outrageous). They signed to Tracklacers developing a sound they then called "Jack the Lad Swing", combining the phrase "Jack the lad" and the urban music of new jack swing. While working their way into the music business, UFO instantly signed to Epic Records, before winning their first award in late 2007 at the Urban Music Awards for Best Unsigned Act thanks to their mash-up of "Stand by Me" by Ben E. King and "Beautiful Girls" by Sean Kingston. Shortly thereafter, they released their second single, "Slap Ya Elbow". The group give credit to 'DJ Triz' who produced one of UFO's first songs and helped them write it.

=== 2008–2009: The X Factor and new name ===
In 2008, UFO auditioned for the fifth series of The X Factor, but had to change their name because it was already being used by another group, so they decided to go with the name JLS (an initialism of Jack the Lad Swing, the style created with Tracklacers some months back). Following the elimination of girl groups Bad Lashes and Girlband in weeks one and two respectively, JLS were Louis Walsh's last remaining act in the competition, but throughout the live shows the judges called them the best band to come out of The X Factor. In week 7, JLS were in the bottom two along with Rachel Hylton. They performed a rendition of Ben E King Stand by Me and Sean Kingston Beautiful Girls and they survived thanks to votes from Walsh, Cheryl Cole and Simon Cowell. Cowell stated when deliberating that JLS did not deserve to be in the bottom two. In the quarter-final, JLS performed "...Baby One More Time" and received negative comments from two of the four judges, with Cowell saying "at the moment you're out", but after their second performance, "You Light Up My Life", Cowell commented that they were "back in the race" and that they could "have a hit record" with the performance.

In the semi-final, JLS performed "Umbrella" and "I'm Already There". Cowell then predicted they would win the competition. They made it to the final and performed their own version of the winner's song, "Hallelujah", which the other finalist Alexandra Burke also performed. The public voted for the second time that night and Burke won the competition, JLS coming second. They were the fourth band to make the final. Some voters claimed the result was rigged due to errors in the voting system and adjudicators not answering the phone and registering their votes. That being said, JLS's manager thought the band would be well suited to Epic Records, with whom they signed a record contract in January 2009.

=== 2009–2010: JLS ===
As soon as the contract was signed, Epic A&Rs Nick Raphael and Jo Charrington began album preparation by contacting the pop songwriters and producers who they thought to be the best in the industry. These included Steve Mac, Wayne Hector, J.R. Rotem and DEEKAY. When they went to see Mac he played them "Beat Again", a song he had written with Hector, and the pair enthusiastically agreed that it was perfect for JLS. Charrington said: "Once you've got that special song everything else seems to fall into place." The song was released as the debut single in July, only six months after the band had signed with the label. It reached No. 1 on the UK Singles Chart on 19 July 2009. On 9 November 2009 JLS released their eponymously titled debut album, JLS. The album debuted at No. 1 on the UK Album Chart, selling over 1 million copies and named the sixth best selling album in the UK during 2009, only being released for 8 weeks before the list was compiled. Their second single "Everybody in Love", released on 2 November 2009, also topped the UK Singles Chart. Their third single, "One Shot", peaked at number six despite a physical release; however, it did stay in the charts for a number of weeks despite the drop. Due to the success of their album, the group went on their first headline tour, with twenty-five dates around the UK and Ireland. The group also became the first The X Factor contestants to win a BRIT Award in 2010, winning the British Breakthrough and Best British Single for "Beat Again". Jay-Z predicted that they would become as big as 'N Sync.

In the beginning of 2010, a bidding war was underway between (US-based) Epic Records and Jive Records to sign JLS to an American deal. The group settled with Jive Records, while continuing to remain with their native signing on Sony Music UK's Epic Records. As of August 2010, the album had sold over 1.2 million copies and had been certified 4× Platinum in the UK.

=== 2010–2011: Outta This World ===
In an interview with HitQuarters recorded in March, producer-songwriter Steve Mac said he was currently at work writing for the second JLS album, Another album contributor, Lucas Secon, said that the style of songs he worked on for the album were "a little more acoustic", prefiguring what he sees as a pop music trend shift from synthetic sounds to a more live approach. Songwriter-producer Chris Braide confirmed in August that he had just written and produced two tracks for the album. Braide said that he composed "skeleton" versions of the songs by himself, and then two members of JLS then came into his London studio to help complete them. One song was written and recorded within the space of a day.

"The Club Is Alive" was announced as the lead single in April and released on 4 July 2010. The group promoted the single on Britain's Got Talent and GMTV. The single debuted at number one, becoming the group's third UK number one single. Then reports suggested that a second single, "Ay Mama", was to be released in United States on 14 September 2010 and was set to feature Barbadian singer-songwriter Shontelle. However the group told Digital Spy that although a song had been recorded with Shontelle, it was never confirmed for the album. On 16 September 2010 the group unveiled the second single, "Love You More" and was a BBC Children in Need single. It was their 4th UK number-one. The group wrote the song with Toby Gad and Wayne Hector. Outta This World was released on 22 November 2010 and debuted at number 2 on the UK Albums Chart selling 152,000 copies, being held off the number 1 spot by the second-week sales of Take That's record breaking Progress album. The album's third single "Eyes Wide Shut" was remixed to feature Tinie Tempah, and has reached number eight on the UK Singles Chart.

Merrygold said that the group had teamed up with Bruno Mars for songs on the third album, and had spoken about the possibility of working with Usher or Rihanna. On 7 January 2011 the album was certified double platinum by BPI, representing sales of over 600,000 in the UK.

=== 2011–2012: Jukebox and Evolution ===
JLS began working on their third album, Jukebox in March 2011. In May 2011 it was confirmed that the first single will feature American singer-songwriter Dev, and is titled "She Makes Me Wanna". The song was produced by BeatGeek, Jimmy Joker, and Teddy Sky, who are part of RedOne's production company after the group bid £30,000 for a recording session with the producer at Alicia Keys' Black Charity Ball in 2010. It was serviced to radio stations on 25 May 2011, while it was released for digital download on 24 July 2011. The album was released on 14 November 2011, and the band embarked on another UK arena tour in support of the album in March and April 2012. On 15 September, JLS announced that "Take a Chance on Me" would be their second single from their album Jukebox. It was released on 4 November 2011, and charted at number two on the UK Singles Chart. The song was written by Emile Ghantous, Frankie Bautista, Nasri Atweh, and Nick Turpin. The band's third single "Do You Feel What I Feel?" was released on 1 January 2012 and became their lowest-charting single to date, peaking at number sixteen. The album charted at number 2 on the UK Album Charts, making it the second consecutive album to miss the number 1 spot, and entered the Irish Album Charts at number 5.

In 2012, JLS recorded the official Sport Relief charity single, "Proud". It was released on 18 March 2012. The song was co-written with Daniel Davidsen, Jason Gill, Cutfather and Ali Tennant, who also worked on the Jukebox album. The band was among the performers at the Diamond Jubilee concert held outside Buckingham Palace on 4 June 2012. On 7 June 2012, they performed at the Royal Albert Hall for the Rays of Sunshine concert, which grants wishes for seriously ill youngsters in the UK aged 3–18 years old. On 8 June 2012, they were announced to perform at the iTunes Festival 2012, along with The X Factor alumni Olly Murs, One Direction and Rebecca Ferguson.

On 21 August 2012, JLS began filming a music video for "Hottest Girl in the World", the lead single from their fourth album. On 25 August, the band announced that their upcoming fourth album would be called Evolution. The album will be released on 5 November. On the direction of the album Merrygold said; "We didn't go by any kind of guidelines or anything like that, we just made what felt right and we're really excited about it." The band also confirmed that a Deluxe version of the LP will be available that will feature bonus and unreleased tracks. Producers on the album include chart-topping US studio bods Rodney Jerkins, Bangladesh, and Midi Mafia. On 6 September, they premiered the lead single, "Hottest Girl in the World", on BBC Radio 1. The single was released on 21 October and debuted at number 6 on the UK Singles Chart.

=== 2013: Goodbye – The Greatest Hits and split ===
On 14 December 2012, JLS were invited to Friday Download as special guests. On 17 December, Humes revealed that the group were to release a follow-up album to Evolution in 2013. On 1 February 2013, it was confirmed that, work on what would have been their fifth studio album, had begun.

On 24 April 2013, JLS released a statement on their official website announcing that they would be splitting up after releasing their greatest hits collection and completing their third and final arena tour. On 24 April 2013, the band confirmed plans to release Goodbye – The Greatest Hits in late 2013, which would be preceded by a new single to coincide with their farewell arena tour across the UK. It was confirmed on 26 September that their final single will be called "Billion Lights", which was released on 17 November 2013 and charted at number 19 on the UK Singles Chart.

JLS officially disbanded following the final gig of their Goodbye Tour at The O2 Arena in London on 22 December 2013.

=== 2020–present: Reunion, Beat Again Tour and 2.0 ===
In November 2019, it was reported that JLS would return as a band after six years, with plans to launch a tour and release new music. This was confirmed on 12 February 2020, when JLS announced their reformation for a reunion tour called the Beat Again Tour.

In February 2021, the band confirmed that a drill track called "Time" was not by them, after the song was thought to be their new single, due to it being credited to an act called JLS (with the song actually being by rappers Switch and J9).

On 8 March, it was announced that JLS had signed a new recording deal with BMG to release new music.

On 3 September 2021 the band released "Eternal Love", the lead single from their fifth studio album 2.0.

"2.0" peaked at number 4 on the UK Charts being their sixth consecutive UK Top 10 album. It also peaked at number 3 on the Scottish Album chart and number 35 on the Irish Albums chart.

On 23 February 2023, the group confirmed they would be going on the Everybody Say JLS: The Hits Tour in Autumn 2023. It began in October in Dublin and will conclude in November at Sheffield.

On 20 March 2025, the group confirmed via their socials that they would be going on tour once more with The Club is Alive: The 2025 Hits Tour in 2025. with guest star Example. It began on the 6 November at OVO Hydro and concluded on 29 November at The O2.

== Influences ==
At their X Factor audition in 2008, JLS said that they aspired to be like groups like Four Tops, Take That, Boyz II Men, Westlife and Jodeci. Other influences include Michael Jackson and The Jackson 5, Backstreet Boys, NSYNC, Take 6, Will.i.am, The Temptations, Bell Biv DeVoe, Frank Sinatra, Lionel Richie, and the Police. Aston Merrygold has cited Usher, Michael Jackson, Mario, Beyoncé, Chris Brown, and Boyz II Men as influences. Marvin Humes cites Michael Jackson, Marvin Gaye, Stevie Wonder, Usher, Ne-Yo, Mariah Carey, Prince, Boyz II Men, Justin Timberlake, and Craig David as his influences. JB Gill cites Michael Jackson, Beyoncé, and Richie as influences.

== Other ventures ==
=== Television appearances ===
As well as appearing on numerous TV programmes for promotion of their albums/singles, JLS have had two special TV shows of their own broadcast. The first was an hour-long documentary for ITV2, titled JLS Revealed, which first aired on 7 November 2009. The documentary followed them in the year after they had finished second in The X Factor, capturing them as they toured with Lemar, released their singles and attended the MOBO Awards amongst other highlights. The second show was an hour-long entertainment show for ITV titled This Is JLS, which first aired on 11 December 2010 before the first show of that year's X Factor final. Filmed before a live studio audience, the band performed all of their hits, tracks from the Outta This World album and a special duet with Kylie Minogue on her hit song "All the Lovers", as well as partaking in surprise hidden camera stunts for lucky fans who had been invited to be in the audience for the show.

The group have also released their own documentary film titled JLS: Eyes Wide Open 3D, making them the first British music act to release a 3D film. Filmed at The O2 Arena during the tour for their second album Outta This World in December 2010/January 2011, and incorporated with documentary footage shot by Ben Winston and Andy Morahan, it was shown exclusively for three days only from 3 June 2011 in over 300 UK cinemas. Due to many cinemas selling out tickets for the initial weekend, additional screenings were made in cinemas for the following weekend from 10 June 2011, thus, more tickets were available to buy online or on the day of screening. It opened at number 5 in the UK Box Office chart, raking in £463,914 from three June weekend screenings alone. A DVD of the film was released on 5 December 2011. JLS also created a one-off Christmas special TV programme called A Very JLS Christmas, in which various celebrities appeared such as Alesha Dixon.

On 28 June 2013, JLS appeared on The Million Pound Drop, playing for charity.

| Year | Title | Role | Notes | Celebrity guest |
|---|---|---|---|---|
| 7 November 2009 | "JLS Revealed" | themselves | TV special ITV | |
| December 2008 | The X Factor | themselves | Runners up, ITV | |
| 11 December 2010 | "This Is JLS" | themselves | TV special ITV2 | Kylie Minogue |
| December 2013 | "A Very JLS Christmas" | themselves | Christmas special | Alesha Dixon |
| 28 June 2013 | "The Million Pound Drop" | themselves | Playing for charity | |
| December 2013 | "Greatest Hits Tour" | themselves | Farewell Tour The O2 Arena | |
| March 2020 | "Saturday Night Takeaway" | themselves | End of the show Guest | |

=== Products and endorsements ===
They have had two best-selling books published, with both featuring photography from the renowned fashion photographer Dean Freeman. The first, Our Story So Far, was published through HarperCollins in September 2009, and went on to become a Sunday Times best-seller. The second, entitled Just Between Us: Our Private Diary, was also published through HarperCollins in September 2010, and was again a best-seller in the run up to Christmas that year.

In addition to launching their own clothing line and the usual merchandising of calendars, posters etc., JLS released branded condoms with Durex under the campaign line "Just Love Safe", as part of a charitable organisation they have established called the JLS Foundation, where they are working together with sexual health charities such as Brook to raise awareness of practising safe sex and family planning. The initiative was launched at a press conference in September 2010. Individually, the band have also become patrons for different charities, namely Beatbullying (Merrygold), Childline (Humes), Rays of Sunshine Children's Charity (Gill) and National MS Society (Williams). Williams was awarded by the Multiple Sclerosis Society of Great Britain with the "Inspiration Award" in April 2010 for his work for the charity.

In January 2011 it was announced that they and Alexandra Burke have worked together to create brand new fashion line, 2KX. Burke and JLS stated, "We are eagerly waiting for the first stocks of the ultra-hyped menswear and womenswear range, due very soon." To coincide with the launch of their third album "Jukebox", they will feature in their very own edition of 'TheirMag', a newly formed sister publication to Rio Ferdinand's "#5" magazine. In March 2012, they launched their first fragrance, Kiss. All four of the band members worked with perfume designer Azzi Glasser to form the scent. In February 2013, they launched their second fragrance, Love, which scent ranges from hints of jasmine, white tea, pink orchid and orange-blossom.

Philanthropy

In 2010 the group founded "The JLS Foundation" a foundation that sets out to raise money for 6 different charities: Cancer Research UK, Rays of Sunshine, Brook, Childline, Beat Bullying and the MS Society. Despite the split, the foundation still exists and all members are still committed to continue the foundation.

JLS have appeared on every Children in need night since 2010. All sales from the JLS number one single Love You More went to Children in Need. In 2011 Merrygold did a VT for the charity in which he met seven-year-old Emily who suffers from Osteogenesis imperfecta. In 2012 JLS performed at the "children in need rocks Manchester" concert performing Take a Chance on Me. In 2013 Aston appeared on Children In Need for the last time as a member of JLS where the group sang a medley of JLS songs at the EastEnders set. JLS have also helped raise money for Comic Relief, appearing in comedy sketches with both Miranda Hart and James Corden.

In 2012 all the band members visited Uganda for Sport Relief appearing in emotional VT's across the night. The same year JLS released the official sport relief Charity single "Proud", which peaked at number 6 in the chart, as well as hosting a special charity concert "JLS sing for Sport Relief" and doing the Sport Relief Mile. In total JLS have appeared in 5 charity singles: A cover of Mariah Carey's "Hero" as part of the X Factor 2008 finalists (for Help for Heroes), Wishing on a Star X Factor finalists featuring JLS and One Direction (for organisation Together for Short Lives) "Love You More" (for Children in Need), "Proud" (for Sport Relief) and "Everybody Hurts" (for Helping Haiti). Four out of 5 of these charity singles got to number one on the UK singles chart.

== Members ==
=== Oritsé Williams ===
Oritsé Jolomi Matthew Soloman Williams (born 27 November 1986) attended St Edwards School in West London, where he was known as Music Boy. He has two brothers and one sister. When he was 12, his mother was diagnosed with multiple sclerosis. He had to care for his brothers and sister whilst attending schools and clubs. He attended the British International School in Lagos, Nigeria. He befriended English/Nigerian singer L Marshall there (who was a student at the school) and won his first talent show performing alongside Marshall in his final year. Williams also attended Larmenier Sacred Heart Catholic Primary School and Cardinal Vaughan Memorial School. He dreamed of being a solo artist from a very young age. He was recruited for many boy bands but believed that a good boy band had to have a good bond between the members. He decided to put together his own boy band, UFO, who later changed their name to JLS (there was another British rock band already called UFO). He wrote the song "Wow Oh Wow" for Jedward.

On 28 September 2013, Williams won the first series of the ITV dancing show Stepping Out, hosted by Davina McCall. He released his debut single "Waterline" featuring Pusha T in June 2015.

=== Marvin Humes ===
Marvin Richard James Humes (born 18 March 1985 in Greenwich, England) is the oldest member of the band. He was a member of another band called VS, created by Blue member Simon Webbe, but they split shortly after releasing an album. After he met future fellow band member Aston Merrygold, Humes joined UFO. Humes appeared in Holby City on the BBC for three years from 2000 to 2003, playing the role of Robbie Waring for 14 episodes. At the age of 14 he starred in a children's programme called K-Club, helping people learn about computers and how they work. Humes has been dating Rochelle Wiseman since March 2010. They were engaged on 31 December 2011 and married on 27 July 2012 at Blenheim Palace. It was announced on Twitter on 22 November 2012 that they were expecting their first child and on 20 May 2013, Wiseman gave birth to their daughter Alaia-Mai. The couple's second child, a daughter, Valentina Raine, was born on 10 March 2017.

He hosted The Voice UK with Emma Willis between 2014-2016 and co presented The Official Big Top 40 with Kat Shoob between 2014 and 2018. He currently hosts The Hit List on BBC One alongside his wife, Rochelle.

=== JB Gill ===
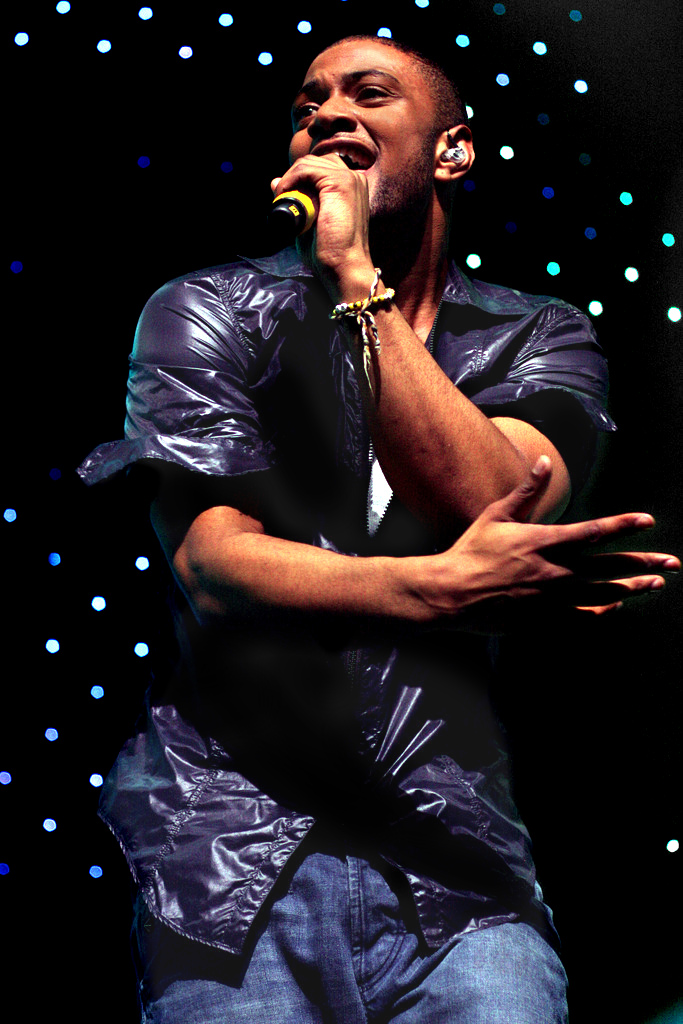
JB Gill on tour in December 2009

Jonathan Benjamin "JB" Gill (born 7 December 1986) is the son of Cynthia and Keith Gill, and has one brother called Neequaye. Gill lived in Antigua until he was about 5 and discovered that he had musical talent at a very early age. After completing his exams at university, he decided to audition for The X Factor in 2008. It was at this point that he came into contact with the other members of JLS. He grew up mostly in Croydon and began making music at the age of seven when he played the recorder, piano, flute and guitar. At the age of nine, Gill joined the choir and went on to perform at the local church. He concentrated on his music and began studying at The Centre for Young Musicians (CYM).

After leaving the CYM, Gill stayed involved with the school music scene. He was involved with the choir at school until he was 15 but gave it up due to the pressures from the school to concentrate on playing rugby. He was in the London Irish rugby club until he was 18. he eventually decided that he wanted to sing rather than play rugby and he took up vocal coaching during a year out before attending university. During that time, Gill was contacted by Oritse to try out for the band because of his musical ear and having an attention to vocal harmonies. He studied theology at King's College London and stayed in halls in Russell Square, before dropping out to pursue a music career.

In December 2012, he won the Christmas Special edition of the BBC program Strictly Come Dancing, performing a jive dance with Ola Jordan. He is now an owner of a farm in Scotland; he has been taking a pause from music and having a very different life as a farmer. In 2014, Gill collaborated with DJ and music producer Charlie Hedges to release his debut solo single "Best Night of My Life", making him the first member of JLS to release solo material. In late 2008, Gill began dating backing dancer Chloe Tangney. In January 2014, the couple announced their engagement and married on 3 May 2014. On 19 September 2014, the couple welcomed a baby boy, Ace Jeremiah Gill. In July 2018, their daughter Chiara Sapphire Gill was born.

He now presents a television show on children's channel CBeebies, called 'Down on the Farm'.

=== Aston Merrygold ===
Aston Iain Merrygold (born 13 February 1988 in Peterborough, England) was born to a Jamaican father and an Anglo-Irish mother. He is one of seven children; he has five brothers and one sister. He was born in Peterborough and grew up there. He attended Jack Hunt School in the city. In 2002, Merrygold entered Stars in Their Eyes where he appeared as Michael Jackson, singing "Rockin' Robin" and finished in second place. He was second yet again with JLS on The X Factor at age 20. he performed in school productions and after leaving school in 2004, was cast in a new ITV programme, Fun Song Factory alongside children's TV presenter Laura Hamilton. In the show, Merrygold played the character "Cookie". Whilst still attending secondary school, he played football on behalf of England in the European Youth Games. His initial aspiration was to play football professionally. However, after developing a nerve problem in his left foot, he tried singing and acting instead. Through acting, he met Humes. As a result, Merrygold received a call from Williams (an acquaintance of Humes) about joining a boy band.

Merrygold worked on his debut solo album Showstopper for a planned mid-2016 release, but it remains unreleased. The lead single of the album, "Get Stupid" was released on 24 July 2015. In August 2017, he was announced as a contestant for the fifteenth series of Strictly Come Dancing. He was eliminated on 5 November 2017, coming in tenth place.

In December 2018, he reunited with dance partner Janette Manrara for Strictly's Christmas Special. The pair performed a jive dance to CeeLo Green's What Christmas Means to Me. They scored a perfect score of 40 and the pair won the TV special. He is engaged to dancer Sarah Lou Richards and their son, Grayson Jax Merrygold was born on 30 January 2018.

== Awards and nominations ==
| Year | Ceremony | Category | Nominated work | Result | Ref |
|---|---|---|---|---|---|
| 2007 | Urban Music Awards | Best Unsigned | | Won | |
| 2009 | 2009 BRIT Awards | Best British Single | "Hero" (with The X Factor finalists) | Nominated | |
| 2009 | MOBO Awards | Best UK Newcomer | | Won | |
| 2009 | MOBO Awards | Best Song | "Beat Again" | Won | |
| 2009 | BBC Switch Live Awards | Switch's Outstanding Artist | | Won | |
| 2009 | BBC Switch Live Awards | Prom King | Aston Merrygold | Nominated | |
| 2009 | Virgin Media Music Awards | Best Group | | Nominated | |
| 2009 | Virgin Media Music Awards | Best Newcomer | | Nominated | |
| 2009 | Virgin Media Music Awards | Best Track | "Beat Again" | Nominated | |
| 2009 | Virgin Media Music Awards | Hottest Male | Aston Merrygold | Nominated | |
| 2010 | 2010 BRIT Awards | British Group | | Nominated | |
| 2010 | 2010 BRIT Awards | British Breakthrough | | Won | |
| 2010 | 2010 BRIT Awards | British Single | "Beat Again" | Won | |
| 2010 | Shockwave NME Awards | Worst Band | | Nominated | |
| 2010 | BT Digital Music Awards | Best Group | | Won | |
| 2010 | BT Digital Music Awards | Best Video | "Everybody in Love" | Won | |
| 2010 | MOBO Awards | Best UK Act | | Won | |
| 2010 | MOBO Awards | Best Album | | Won | |
| 2010 | Urban Music Awards | Best R&B Act | | Won | |
| 2010 | Urban Music Awards | Best Group | | Won | |
| 2011 | BT Digital Music Awards | Best Group | | Won | |
| 2011 | BT Digital Music Awards | Best Video | "Eyes Wide Shut" | Won | |
| 2011 | BT Digital Music Awards | Best Fansite | "Eyes Wide Shut" | Nominated | |
| 2012 | MOBO Awards | Best Video | "Do You Feel What I Feel?" | Won | |
| 2013 | Virgin Media Awards | Best Group | | Nominated | |

== Tours ==
Headlining

- JLS: The Theatre Tour (2010)
- Outta This World Tour (2010 - 2011)
- 4th Dimensions Tour (2012)
- Goodbye: The Greatest Hits Tour (2013) (originally known as the "Evolution Tour")
- Beat Again Tour (2021)
- Everybody Say JLS: The Hits Tour (2023)
- The Club is Alive: The 2025 Hits Tour (2025)

Co-headlining

- X Factor Live 2009 (2009) (with Alexandra Burke, Diana Vickers, Ruth Lorenzo, Rachel Hylton, Daniel Evans, Laura White, and Eoghan Quigg)
- US Summer Tour (2010) (with Hot Chelle Rae)
- Summer UK Tour (2011) (with Olly Murs)

== Discography ==
- JLS (2009)
- Outta This World (2010)
- Jukebox (2011)
- Evolution (2012)
- 2.0 (2021)
