= Azzi Glasser =

British perfume designer (born 1970)

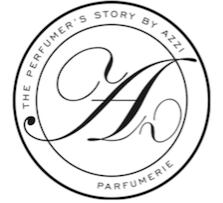
The Perfumer's Story by Azzi Glasser

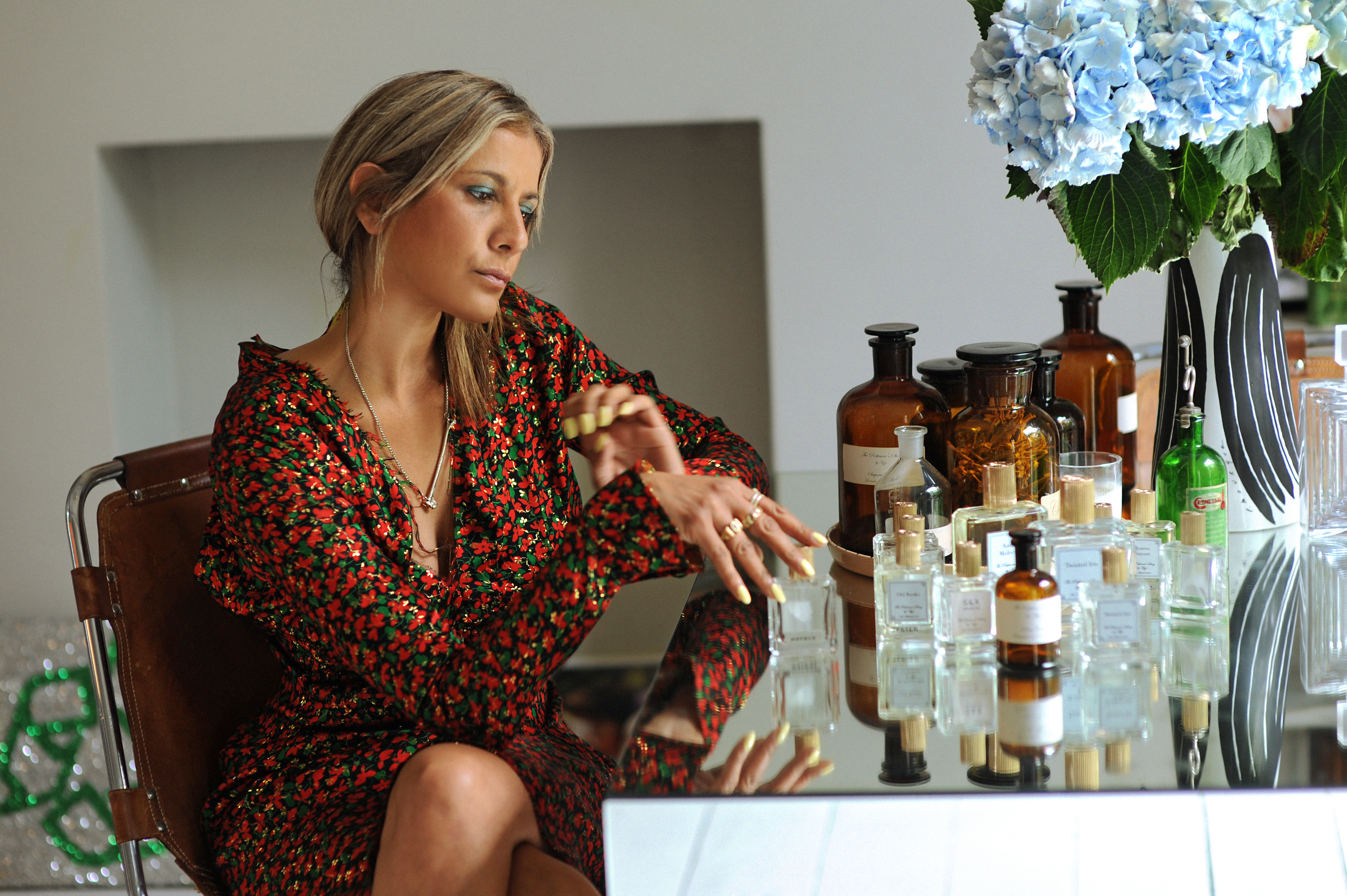
Glasser in 2018

Azzi Glasser (born January 1970) is a British perfume creative director. Glasser started her career in 1991, working for CPL Aromas, and went on to start her own companies, Agent Provocateur Parfum Ltd in 1999 INA Crystals in 2007, Family Three in 2001, Bella Freud Parfum in 2013 and The Perfumer's Story, by Azzi Glasser in 2015.

== Early life ==
Born in North London in 1970, Glasser spent four years in India from 1971-1975.

== CPL Aromas ==
In 1991 Glasser joined CPL Aromas, a perfume house in Hertfordshire. There she trained to understand the chemical behaviour of raw materials, and aged 23 became commercial director, leading to her role as global commercial director for the perfume house.

== Agent Provocateur ==
In 1999 Glasser co-founded Agent Provocateur Parfums with Joseph Corré and Serena Rees, launching her first retail perfume ‘Agent Provocateur’. It won the Fifi 2001 award for best new female fragrance in limited distribution, together with a special award for creative imagery. Launched in 60 countries, Glasser and the team went on to create a bath and body collection which together with new additions to the fragrance led to the launch of the ‘House of Parfums’.

== Family Three ==
In 2001 Glasser founded Family Three, which creates fragrances for fashion designers, beauty brands, actors, musicians and artists, such as Helena Bonham Carter, Jude Law, Kylie Minogue, Tom Hardy, Noomi Rapace, Orlando Bloom and Johnny Depp. She also works with Andre Balazs on scents for his hotels, such as the Chiltern Firehouse. Azzi also created the scent for The Brompton Club London (now Ramusake).

== INA Crystals ==
In 2007 Glasser collaborated with make-up artist Mary Vango creating a skincare range. Customers include Helena Bonham Carter, Sharleen Spiteri, Victoria Beckham, Kate Moss, Kylie Minogue, Sadie Frost, and Alison Mosshart.

== The Perfumer’s Story By Azzi ==
In October 2015, Glasser released her first collection of 11 limited edition men's, women's and unisex fragrances from her back catalogue in collaboration with retailer Harvey Nichols.

== Bella Freud Parfum Limited ==
Bella Freud Parfum is a company created by Freud and Glasser in 2013.

The Bella Freud Parfum collection, launched in 2014, includes four Eau de Parfums: Je t'aime Jane, Ginsberg is God, 1970 and Signature.

== Personal life ==
She is married to Dan Glasser, a photographer, and they have two sons.
