= Agent Provocateur (lingerie) =

Lingerie company

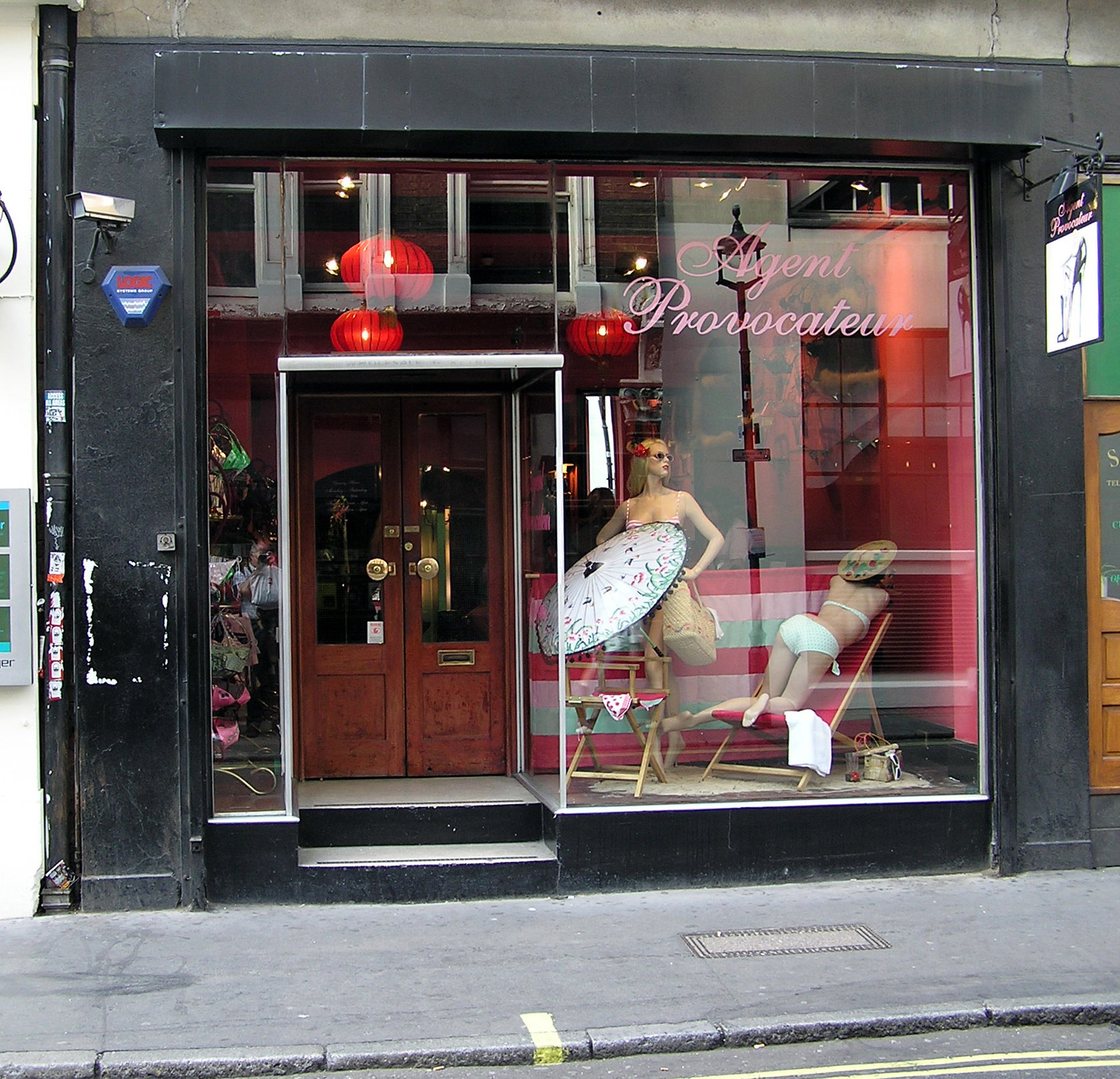
- Agent Provocateur's first store, on Broadwick Street, Soho, London
- Type: Privately held company
- Industry: Apparel
- Founded: 1994; 32 years ago
- Founders: Joseph Corré; Serena Rees
- Headquarters: London, England, United Kingdom
- Key people: Sarah Shotton (Creative director)
- Products: lingerie, sleepwear, hosiery, swimwear, accessories, outerwear, fragrances
- Number of employees: 600 (2017)
- Website: https://www.agentprovocateur.com

Agent Provocateur is a British lingerie retailer founded in 1994 by Joseph Corré and Serena Rees. The company has stores in 13 countries.

== History ==
=== 1994–2007 ===
In 1994, Agent Provocateur was founded by Joseph Corré, the son of Vivienne Westwood, and his then-wife Serena Rees. The first store opened in Soho on Broadwick Street.

The company sells colourful and fashionable lingerie. Joseph Corré is the designer for the brand.

=== 2007–2017 ===
In 2007, after the divorce of Corré and Rees, 3i, a private equity firm that invests in mid-size companies, purchased 80% of the company for £60 million.

Between November 2007 and March 2009 the company opened 13 shops, expanding to the US, Russia, Dubai and Hong Kong. By March 2008, Agent Provocateur's profits dropped 18% to £2.2 million due to the cost of expansion.

Garry Hogarth stepped down as CEO in February 2016.

In March 2017, the business entered administration. As part of a "pre-pack" deal, it was purchased by Four Holdings, a company one-third owned by British businessman Mike Ashley's Sports Direct International who reportedly paid around "£25m after seeing off competition from private equity firm Lion Capital." Its US business entered Chapter 11 bankruptcy the following month, with US stores also being sold to Four Holdings.

== Marketing ==
The company is known for its provocative videos. Australian actress Melissa George, English model Chloe Hayward and American model Elettra Rossellini Wiedemann appeared in a John Cameron Mitchell-directed campaign, which urged women to control their own destinies while wearing the company's lingerie.

In December 2001, company produced a controversial short film featuring Kylie Minogue riding a velvet bucking bronco while wearing the company's underwear to prove that their lingerie brand is the most erotic according to the male viewers.

In the 2000s, the brand's annual revamp of its website, first by Wax New Media and then Large Design, became an industry benchmark.

In 2006, Mike Figgis directed a short film for Agent Provocateur starring model Kate Moss.

Other models have included actress Maggie Gyllenhaal in 2007, British model Daisy Lowe in 2008, and model Hailey Clauson in a 2014 ad campaign photographed by Miles Aldridge. In January 2019, the brand hired plus-size model Charli Howard to front their Valentine's Day campaign, entitled "A Love Letter To Myself".

== Logo ==
The original Agent Provocateur logo and wordmark were set from an existing over-the-counter typeface. As Corré’s venture grew, graphic design company House Industries redrew and expanded on the logo. They penned a flowing Spencerian wordmark as well as a racy leg logo for products including tissue paper and fabric monograms.

== Criticism ==
Agent Provocateur had some of its advertisements banned by the Advertising Standards Authority (United Kingdom) for "being degrading to women."

Following the Russian invasion of Ukraine in February 2022, many Western companies curtailed their operations in Russia. According to Agent Provocateur's Russian website there are 10 Agent Provocateur franchise stores still operating in Moscow, leading to claims that the company is helping to finance Russia's war in Europe.

Agent Provocateur said that the stores are "operated by franchisees under franchise/license agreements" according to "a system established by the previous owner of the business, many years ago" and that the company itself "does not 'operate' in Russia."
