= The Club is Alive: The 2025 Hits Tour =

2025 concert tour by JLS

- Tour by JLS
- Start date: November 6, 2025
- End date: November 29, 2025

JLS concert chronology
- Everybody Say JLS: The Hits Tour (2023); The Club is Alive: The 2025 Hits Tour (2025)

The Club is Alive: The 2025 Hits Tour is the seventh concert tour by JLS.

== Background ==
The tour was announced in March 2025.

== Set list ==
The set-list was determined by the fans.

== Support acts ==
- Example

== Tour dates ==
November 2025:

- Glasgow OVO Hydro - 6 November
- Aberdeen P&J Live - 7 November
- Newcastle Utilita Arena - 8 November
- Belfast SSE Arena - 10 November
- Dublin 3Arena - 11 November
- Liverpool M&S Bank Arena - 13 November
- Sheffield Utilita Arena - 14 November
- Manchester Co-op Live - 15 November
- Cardiff Utilita Arena - 17 November
- Leeds First Direct Arena - 20 November
- Birmingham Utilita Arena - 21 November
- Bournemouth International Centre - 23 November
- Brighton Centre - 25 November
- Nottingham Motorpoint Arena - 27 November
- London The O2 - 28 November
- London The O2 - 29 November

== Reviews ==
The tour was received positively.
