= Charli Howard =

English model, author and body activist

- Born: Charlotte Howard; 6 April 1991 (age 35)
- Occupations: Model; author; body positivity activist

Charlotte Howard (born 6 April 1991) is an English model, author and body positivity activist. She has worked in fashion modelling and has advocated for greater representation and diversity within the fashion industry. Howard is the author of several books addressing body image and mental health, including the memoir Misfit (2018). In 2019, she became presenter of the BBC podcast Fashion Fix.

== Modelling ==
Howard has worked for numerous brands and fashion campaigns, including Maybelline, Redken, British Vogue, Allure magazine and Pat McGrath. She is one of the faces of Pat McGrath's beauty line and considered a "McGrath Muse".

Howard had tried to model in her teens, but was rejected by numerous agencies. At 21, she was signed to a London-based agency after her friend submitted her Facebook photos without her knowledge.

In 2015, Howard was dropped by her then-London model agency for allegedly being "too big" to model. In response, she wrote a lengthy Facebook post that subsequently went viral, with thousands of shares, and appeared on Channel 4 news to share her side of the story. Upon hearing about the post, New York-based model agency Muse Management signed her, and Howard moved to New York.

Howard is considered a "plus size" model, despite only being a UK size 10-12/US 6-8. In an interview with Hello! magazine, Howard is quoted as saying, "I've got a D cup boob, I've got a size 10 to 12 hip - well, a 12 probably - and I've got a tummy that never seems to go away, no matter how many sit-ups I do... I'm curvy, but I know that I'm not a plus-size model and I've not given myself that term. That's what other people label me."

In January 2019, Howard was announced as the new face of global lingerie brand, Agent Provocateur.

== Books ==
Howard published two books in 2018: Splash, a novel about issues such as bullying, friendships and body image, and Misfit, a memoir about Howard's battles with eating disorders, obsessive–compulsive disorder, and anxiety. She told the Guardian newspaper that she wishes to "create strong literary characters for girls" in her books. Misfit was published in February 2018 by Penguin Random House.

Howard's first children's novel, Splash, was published in July 2018. In an interview with Hello! Fashion Monthly magazine, Howard said that she wrote the book "to pass the time". Author Jacqueline Wilson described Splash as a "much-needed book that will strike a chord with so many girls - and help them dare to be different."

In 2026 she brought out her book Flesh: Decentering The Male Gaze and Reclaiming the Objectified Body, which she said was about "all the men that have sexualised me since I was seven".
