= Serena Rees =

British businesswoman (born 1968)

Serena Rees MBE
- Born: 14 March 1968 (age 57); England
- Occupation: Businesswoman
- Spouse: Joseph Corré (????–2007) divorced
- Partner: Paul Simonon (2007–present)
- Children: 1, model Cora Corré

Serena Rees MBE (born 14 March 1968) is a British entrepreneur, founder, fashion designer, and public speaker. She founded Agent Provocateur with her then husband Joseph Corré in 1994 and Les Girls Les Boys in 2017.

== Early life ==
Rees was adopted at an early age by Indian parents; her birth mother was from Kashmir. Rees left school at age 16. She was working as a model in Chelsea, in 1992 when she met Joseph Corré, the son of Vivienne Westwood and Malcolm McLaren.

== Agent Provocateur ==
Rees decided to open a lingerie store that would be filled with colourful and fashion-forward lingerie. The store opened in 1994 on Broadwick Street, Soho as a retail shop. Eventually Rees and Corre began designing their own line of lingerie as well.

Agent Provocateur became a well known brand selling in 13 different countries and over 30 stores. Rees maintained a strict confidentiality policy which allowed celebrity clients to feel comfortable purchasing the products. The brand often features celebrity models such as Kate Moss.

Rees and Corre sold Agent Provocateur to private equity house 3i for £60m, as part of their divorce settlement.

== Les Girls Les Boys ==
Les Girls Les Boys is a men's and women's underwear, intimates and streetwear brand, founded by Serena Rees in May 2017.

== Other business ventures ==
Rees then started Cocomaya, a bakery and chocolatier with several branches in London, where she resides with her daughter and partner Simonon.
