= Joseph Corré =

British activist and businessman (born 1967)

- Born: Joseph Ferdinand Corré; 30 November 1967 (age 58); Clapham, London, England
- Occupation: Businessman
- Years active: 1994–present
- Known for: Founder of Agent Provocateur
- Spouse: Serena Rees (divorced)
- Children: 1, model Cora Corré
- Parent(s): Malcolm McLaren (father); Vivienne Westwood (mother)

Joseph Ferdinand Corré (born 30 November 1967) is a British activist and businessman, who co-founded Agent Provocateur in 1994.

== Early years ==
Corré was born in Clapham, south London, the son of British fashion designer Dame Vivienne Westwood and Malcolm McLaren, former manager of the Sex Pistols.

Corré's surname, which was not adopted but given at birth, derives from his father's maternal grandmother, a Sephardic Jew from Portugal. As a child, he wore his mother's designs and regarded the Sex Pistols as his favourite band, despite a poor relationship with frontman/singer John Lydon.

== Career ==
Corré and his wife Serena Rees established the shop Agent Provocateur in 1994. The shop originally sold other designers' pieces, until Corré created their own lingerie line. Since then, the company has expanded to 30 shops in 14 countries. Rees left Corré for ex-Clash bassist Paul Simonon in 2007, and in the same year the to-be divorced couple agreed to sell Agent Provocateur to private equity house 3i for £60m.

In June 2007, Corré was appointed an MBE for his services to the fashion industry in the Queen's Birthday Honours list. He rejected the award in protest at Prime Minister Tony Blair's actions in Iraq and Afghanistan which Corré said had caused suffering and at the erosion in civil rights in the UK during Blair's term.

In 2008, he opened the independent boutique A Child of the Jago named after the 19th century novel by Arthur Morrison. The venture was a partnership with British street-wear fashion entrepreneur Simon "Barnzley" Armitage, modelled on the retail outlets run by Corré's parents in the 1970s/80s. Armitage left the business in 2013 and is no longer referenced in the company's history.

In 2010, he was appointed brand director of the cosmetics company Illamasqua.

== Relationship with father ==
On McLaren's death in a Swiss medical centre from a rare form of cancer in April 2010, Corré said: "It was hard for me because he never wanted to do the emotional stuff that comes with being a parent. He ran away from it and I found that hard to take. We had a difficult relationship, but it was all right in the end. I went to Switzerland and we said what we had to say and we made our peace. I'm really glad I did that. It was such a release for both of us".

Corré organised his father's funeral, at which McLaren was buried in a coffin sprayed with the slogan "Too Fast To Live Too Young To Die" (the title of one of his shops). The ceremony was attended by celebrities including Bob Geldof and Tracey Emin, and accompanied by a public procession to punk songs, including the Sid Vicious version of "My Way". In 2012 probate was granted to Young Kim, McLaren's girlfriend during the last 16 years of his life, by McLaren's will, which Corré had contested because he was excluded from it.

== Ownership of father's domain name ==
Corré is registered as the administrative officer of malcolmmclaren.com. In 2012 he bought the domain name from Paul August Nordstrom of Singapore for $750; August had worked for McLaren and in 1997 registered the domain to himself without McLaren's knowledge. August, who said in 2013 he could "no longer recall specifically why he placed his own name as registrant", had previously refused to pass the domain to the Malcolm McLaren Estate.

== Politics ==
Prior to the 2015 general election, he was one of several celebrities who endorsed the parliamentary candidacy of the Green Party's Caroline Lucas. Together with his mother, he publicly campaigned for the release of WikiLeaks publisher and journalist Julian Assange.

== 2016 protest ==
In November 2016 in a staged protest to encourage use of renewable energy, Corré and Vivienne Westwood burned an estimated £6,000,000 worth of his punk rock memorabilia archive on a barge on the River Thames. When asked about the incident by The Sunday Telegraph, "Did this feel like burning a Picasso?", Corré replied "I don’t know what burning a Picasso feels like," adding, "but I thought that was great. Punk rock is not important. Punk has become another marketing tool to sell you something you don’t need".

Musician Henry Rollins wrote in response to the incident, "Corré and Westwood might think they have taught everyone a lesson in what punk’s all about, but all they did was show off their massive egos and how much they’ve lost the plot. Maybe it was something else, too. Perhaps it was an emotional response to the fact that McLaren cut Corré out of his will. It doesn’t matter now. It’s yesterday’s garbage. Ooh, how punk."

Wake Up Punk is Nigel Askew's documentary with interviews of Vivienne Westwood and her two sons Ben Westwood and Joe Corré, about burning some of his own (Joe Corré's) collection of punk memorabilia, and having Nigel Askew record the event.

"The lack of clarity and disjointed information ultimately keeps Askew’s production from joining the ranks of the great punk films that came before."—Film Threat

"She (Vivienne Westwood) amusingly recalls a police raid wherein all t-shirts emblazoned with swear words were removed, while t-shirts demonstrating how to make a bomb were left unmolested on the shelves."—The Irish Times

"We learn McLaren thought himself to be a Fagin-like figure, someone 'who wanted to cause maximum chaos,' adds fellow punk Eddie Tudor Pole. 'He was like a kid who wanted to take a tin of beans from the bottom of a supermarket display.'"—Camden New Journal

"This is the first feature from activist, videographer and fashion archivist Askew, who has had a long-standing creative relationship with Corré, having previously made a series of music videos for Corré’s lingerie company Agent Provocateur."—Screen Daily

"He (Joe Corré) wanted to make a film about nobody understanding what’s going on in the world when we’re all going to die from climate change."—Vivienne Westwood
