= Goodbye: The Greatest Hits Tour =

Goodbye: The Greatest Hits Tour was the fourth concert tour by JLS. It was their final tour before their split, before reuniting in 2020. It accompanied their album Goodbye – The Greatest Hits.

== Background ==
In April 2013, JLS announced they were splitting.

== Set list ==
According to the Birmingham show:

- Hottest Girl in the World
- Have Your Way
- The Club Is Alive
- One Shot
- Eyes Wide Shut
- Billion Lights
- Keep You
- Superhero
- Only Tonight
- I Know What She Like
- Only Making Love
- Dessert
- So Many Girls
- Close to You
- Crazy for You
- 3D
- Better for You
- Take a Chance on Me
- Hold Me Down
- Billionaire
- Proud
- Umbrella (Rihanna cover)
- Love You More
- Beat Again
- Treasure (Bruno Mars cover)
- Do You Feel What I Feel
- She Makes Me Wanna

Encore:

- End of the Road (Boyz II Men cover)
- Everybody in Love

== Tour dates ==
As announced in 2013.

Date	City	Country	Venue
4 December 2013	Nottingham	England	Capital FM Arena
6 December 2013	Aberdeen	Scotland	AECC
7 December 2013	Glasgow	Scotland	Hydro Arena
9 December 2013	Liverpool	England	Echo Arena
10 December 2013	Sheffield	England	Motorpoint Arena
11 December 2013	Birmingham	England	LG Arena
12 December 2013	Newcastle	England	Metro Radio Arena
13 December 2013	Birmingham	England	LG Arena
14 December 2013	Manchester	England	Manchester Arena
16 December 2013	Brighton	England	Brighton Centre
17 December 2013	Bournemouth	England	Bournemouth International Centre
18 December 2013	Cardiff	Wales	Motorpoint Arena
20 December 2013	Leeds	England	Leeds Arena
21 December 2013	London	England	The O2 Arena
22 December 2013	London	England	The O2 Arena

== Reviews ==
The tour was positively received.
