= Beat Again =

Single by JLS

from the album JLS
- B-side: "Umbrella"
- Released: 12 July 2009
- Recorded: 2009
- Genre: Pop; R&B
- Length: 3:19
- Label: Epic
- Songwriters: Wayne Hector; Steve Mac
- Producer: Steve Mac

JLS singles chronology
"Beat Again" (2009)	"Everybody in Love" (2009)

Music video
- JLS - Beat Again on YouTube

"Beat Again" is the debut single by English boy band JLS. It was released on 12 July 2009 as the lead single from their self-titled debut studio album JLS (2009). The song was written by Wayne Hector and Steve Mac and produced by Mac. The song's B-side is a cover of "Umbrella" by Rihanna, which JLS covered during the semi-finals of the fifth series of The X Factor in December 2008.

The song debuted at number one on the UK Singles Chart. It also peaked at number three in the Republic of Ireland. It has sold over 574,000 copies in the United Kingdom as of August 2018 making it the band's best-selling song. As of 2021, "Beat Again" has sold 843,426 in the UK.

== Background and composition ==
After finishing as runners-up to Alexandra Burke on the fifth series of The X Factor in December 2008, JLS signed a record deal with Epic Records. Epic managing director Nick Raphael said, "JLS are the best boy band to emerge from a TV talent show. The band already have an incredible fan base, and I look forward to launching their recording career."

"Beat Again" was unusual for being a debut single from a reality show contestant in that was not a cover version, following in the footsteps of Girls Aloud and Shayne Ward. Instead, this song written especially for JLS by Wayne Hector and Steve Mac. The song was originally titled 'No Beat' and supposedly took only two hours to write. Mac himself had originally presented the song to Nick Raphael, JLS' A&R at Epic Records, as a potential single. "Beat Again" is written in the key of A-flat minor. Raphael had originally been looking for a ballad in the vein of Boyz II Men's "End of the Road" and had in fact already asked Mac for another "Flying Without Wings". However, according to co-writer Wayne Hector, Raphael's response upon hearing the new song was, "this is the single. I can feel it. It's fantastic." Raphael had supposedly originally intended "Everybody in Love" to be the lead single but changed his mind at the last minute.

== Critical reception ==
To date, "Beat Again" has garnered mixed to positive reviews from music critics. Giving the single three stars, Alex Fletcher of Digital Spy noted that JLS "have at least broken with X Factor convention on their debut single". Fletcher also drew positive comparisons to work by American R&B artist Ne-Yo. However, the reviewer went on to say the single is "cheesier than a Jennifer Aniston rom-com". Another review, giving the single three stars out of five, said "Beat Again seems to lack originality". It was included on the Popjustice song of the day. The Daily Record wrote that the single had "the R&B electro sass of Justin Timberlake or Rihanna [and] will surprise many".

Rolling Stone ranked the song at number 69 in their list of 75 Greatest Boy Band Songs of All Time in 2020.

== Chart performance ==
"Beat Again" made its chart debut on the Billboard Euro Digital Tracks chart at number 13, and on the Euro Digital Songs at number 19. The song debuted on the Irish Singles Chart at number four. The song debuted at number one on the UK Singles Chart. It sold 106,299 copies in its first week on sales, making it the second fastest-selling single of 2009, behind Dizzee Rascal's "Bonkers". "Beat" Again" has sold over 574,000 copies in the UK as of July 2018. The song was also released in the United States in July 2009, but failed to chart or garner commercial interest.

The song won Best British Single at the MOBO Awards 2009 and 2010 BRIT Awards.

== Music video ==
The music video was shot in May 2009 and released on 4 June 2009. It features various scenes of JLS dancing to the song in front of blue, red, yellow and green lights, all of which represent the different band members. The dance choreography involves moves revolving around heartbeats, alluding to the title "Beat Again".

== Track listing ==
1. "Beat Again" – 3:19
2. "Umbrella" – 4:21

== Charts ==
=== Weekly charts ===
Chart (2009)	Peak position
Bulgaria (Nielsen Airplay)	2
Europe (European Hot 100 Singles)	6
Ireland (IRMA)	3
Romania TV Airplay (Media Forest)	1
Scotland Singles (OCC)	1
UK Singles (OCC)	1
UK Airplay (Music Week)	1

=== Year-end charts ===
Chart (2009)	Position
UK Singles Chart (OCC)	16
UK Airplay (Music Week)	5
Chart (2010)	Position
Romanian Top 100	71

== Certifications ==
Region	Certification	Certified units/sales
United Kingdom (BPI)	Platinum	843,426

== Release history ==
Region	Date	Format	Label
Ireland	12 July 2009	Digital download, CD single	Sony Music, Epic Records
United Kingdom	13 July 2009	Digital download, CD single	Sony Music, Epic Records
United States	14 July 2009	Digital download, CD single	Epic Records
Australia	31 July 2009	Digital download, CD single	Sony Music, Epic Records
