= Everybody in Love =

2009 single by JLS

Single by JLS

from the album JLS
- B-side: "Spell It Out"
- Released: 1 November 2009
- Recorded: 2009
- Genre: Pop; R&B
- Length: 3:16
- Label: Epic
- Songwriters: J.R. Rotem; Wayne Hector; David D.A. Doman
- Producer: J.R. Rotem

JLS singles chronology
"Beat Again" (2009)	"Everybody in Love" (2009)	"One Shot" (2010)

Alternative covers
- United States Single Cover

"Everybody in Love" is a song by English boyband JLS from their self-titled debut album (2009). The song was released as a digital download on 1 November 2009, followed by a physical release the following day. The song became the band's second number one single in the UK on 8 November 2009, with a total of 600,000 copies being sold so far in the UK, earning the single a Platinum certification. The song was released to U.S. Mainstream Top 40 radio on 23 February 2010, but failed to chart on Billboard Hot 100.

== Background ==
According to co-writer Wayne Hector, "Everybody in Love" was intended to be the lead single from JLS until A&R Nick Raphael changed his mind at the last minute and opted instead for "Beat Again". On the 14th anniversary of the song's release in 2023, Marvin Humes wrote on his Instagram that Raphael had first sent him the demo via email as a present on his 24th birthday in 2009: "A record that I will never get tired of performing with my boys ... What a gift that was and what a gift it still is!"

== Critical reception ==
To date, "Everybody in Love" has garnered mixed to positive reviews, and it was also becoming the only JLS song to become popular and to have charted in the US. Digital Spy said that: "Groundbreaking it ain't, but Everybody in Love is catchy, feelgood and thoroughly likable. It's also as mushy as the peas at your local chip shop, with the boys issuing this imperative at the start of the song and again towards the end: "Everybody in love, go on put your hands up." If we could listen, type and wave our phone above our head all at the same time, believe us we would be." Popjustice also said "Everybody In Love is so in need of its own 'HRNK' - that international sound effect of the quite good pop tune - that it actually opens with the sound of a rave horn. You cannot say fairer than that."

FemaleFirst stated that the song was "Pretty much what we all expected from this JLS single ‘Everybody in Love’. It follows the idea that if you repeat a catchy chorus 100 times then it will become anthemic-a song to sing along to in a club after a few WKD's". They also stated that "Despite it being uber-predictable, the track works on a surface level and the catchy tune will prove a hit, especially with teenagers, and so in that respect it does the job. It would be nice to hear something a bit less obvious for their next effort".

== Music video ==
The video for "Everybody in Love" was shot in August 2009 at Pico House in Los Angeles, and it was the band’s first music video to be shot there. The music video was released in the UK in late September 2009. It shows JLS performing to a crowd of people on a purpose built stage, as well as solo shots of the individual members being accompanied by a love interest that they sing to.

== Track listing ==
1. "Everybody In Love" - 3:16
2. "Spell It Out" - 3:54

== Promotion and performances ==
JLS made their first live performance of the song on the results show of The X Factor on 1 November 2009, the day that the single was released for download. They would return later in the series to perform the song at the series' final with Alexandra Burke, where the song was performed as part of a mix with Burke's own #1 single "Bad Boys". The song was also performed on numerous TV shows throughout promotion of the single and the JLS album, including children's TV shows TMi and Blue Peter, daytime shows GMTV and This Morning, plus events such as BBC Switch Live, T4 Stars of 2009 and the annual BBC Children in Need telethon and that year's Christmas edition of Top of the Pops.

The song is traditionally the encore number on their live tours, and after the last chorus ends with a call and response chant between the band and the audience: 'Now everybody say JLS/Now everybody say JLS/Forever, and ever'. This chant subsequently informed the name of their sixth concert tour, Everybody Say JLS: The Hits Tour in the autumn of 2023. The band also performed this song in 2010 at T4 on the Beach and their special for Channel 4's The Album Chart Show, and their ITV1 Christmas special This is JLS, and again in 2011 for The Album Chart Show for the special to promote their 3rd album, Jukebox.

Following Humes' participation in the 2023 series of I'm a Celebrity...Get Me Out of Here!, the song, along with "She Makes Me Wanna", gained new popularity after he sang it in the jungle with fellow contestant and eventual series winner, Sam Thompson.

== Chart performance ==
"Everybody in Love" entered the Irish Singles Chart on 5 November 2009 at number 2. The song reached number 1 in the UK Singles Chart on 9 November with over 100,000 copies sold in the first week, before dropping to number 3 on 15 November.

== Charts ==
=== Weekly charts ===
Chart (2009–2010)	Peak position
Canada Hot AC (Billboard)	38
Europe (European Hot 100 Singles)	4
Ireland (IRMA)	2
Scottish Singles Sales (Official Charts)	1
UK Singles (Official Charts)	1
UK Airplay (Music Week)	1
UK Hip Hop/R&B (Official Charts)	1
US Pop Airplay (Billboard)	38

=== Year-end charts ===
Chart (2009)	Position
UK Singles (Official Charts Company)	42
UK Airplay (Music Week)	41

== Certifications ==
Region	Certification	Certified units/sales
United Kingdom (BPI)	Platinum	746,260

== Release history ==
Region	Date	Format	Label
UK & Ireland	1 November 2009	Digital download	Epic Records
UK & Ireland	2 November 2009	CD single	Epic Records
United States	9 February 2010	Digital download	Jive Records
United States	23 February 2010	Mainstream Radio	Jive Records
