= One Shot (JLS song) =

2010 single by JLS

Single by JLS

from the album JLS
- B-side: "Mary"
- Released: 21 February 2010
- Recorded: 2009
- Genre: Pop; dance-pop; R&B
- Length: 3:47
- Label: Epic
- Songwriters: Carsten Schack; Kenneth Karlin; Michael Warren; Brandon White; Sean Hurley
- Producer: Soulshock & Karlin

JLS singles chronology
"Everybody in Love" (2009)	"One Shot" (2010)	"The Club Is Alive" (2010)

Alternative cover
- CD2 Cover

"One Shot" is a song by English boy band JLS. It was written by Soulshock & Karlin, Michael Warren, Brandon White, and Sean Hurley. It was released on 21 February 2010 as their third and final single from their self-titled debut album (2009). The song reached the A-List on BBC Radio 1's playlist, and reached number six in the United Kingdom, where it has so far sold 302,493 copies.

== Critical reception ==
Digital Spy awarded the song 3 stars and said: "It's essentially a classic boyband ballad given some trendy, rave-tinged production - lyrics to please Louis Walsh, synth sounds to satisfy the Kiss FM playlist team. Decent enough then, but as with most of their album, it does make you wonder how far JLS might go with some really good tunes?"

Fraser McAlpine of BBC Chart blog gave the song a positive review stating "You've got to love a song with two tempos. I mean most songs have just the one. They begin, tick away the minutes, sometimes stopping, sometimes starting up again, but they really don't ever tend to deviate from their one central pulse. But this has got TWO. TWO! The opening verse is wafty and slow, Aston calmly explaining that he's got his eye on a special someone and he's trying to screw his courage up into a little ball so that he can go and ask her out. Then there's some ravey synth action, which is whizzy and fast and we're into the chorus, which is - and this is where the genius lies - BOTH OF THESE THINGS AT THE SAME TIME!"

== Promotion ==
On 17 December 2009, JLS performed the song on Alan Carr: Chatty Man, as well as So You Think You Can Dance on 23 January 2010. They performed the track on 10 February, on GMTV with Lorraine, before giving an interview. The single was also performed at Let's Dance for Sport Relief, The Album Chart Show, and The National Lottery Draws.

== Music video ==
The music video premiered on 16 January 2010.

== Track listing ==
CD1 (88697634512)

1. "One Shot" (Radio Version #1) – 3:38
2. "Mary" – 3:05

CD2 (88697658892)

1. "One Shot" (Radio Version #2) – 3:18
2. "One Shot" (Kardinal Beats Radio Edit) – 3.42
3. "One Shot" (Kardinal Beats Remix feat. Mr Damz) – 3.55
4. "One Shot" (Bimbo Jones Remix) – 6.49
5. "One Shot" (Nu Addiction Remix) – 7:17

== Charts ==
=== Weekly charts ===
Chart (2010)	Peak position
Ireland (IRMA)	11
Scotland Singles (OCC)	7
UK Singles (OCC)	6
UK Airplay (Music Week)	1

=== Year-end charts ===
Chart (2010)	Position
UK Singles (Official Charts Company)	61
UK Airplay (Music Week)	31

== Certifications ==
Region	Certification	Certified units/sales
United Kingdom (BPI)	Gold	482,513

== Release history ==
Region	Date	Format	Label	Catalogue
United Kingdom	21 February 2010	Digital download	Epic Records	
United Kingdom	22 February 2010	CD1	Epic Records	88697634512
United Kingdom	22 February 2010	CD2	Epic Records	88697658892
