= Headlines! Live from the Hammersmith Apollo =

Live album by The Saturdays
- Released: 21 November 2011
- Recorded: 17 February 2011
- Genre: Pop
- Length: 78:00
- Label: Universal

Headlines! Live from the Hammersmith Apollo is the first live DVD by British-Irish girl group The Saturdays. The DVD was filmed on 17 February 2011 when the band performed at the Hammersmith Apollo during their The Headlines Tour. The DVD was released as a bonus as part of the deluxe boxset of the band's third album On Your Radar. The DVD is not available outside the boxset, and the boxset was only available for purchase from the band's official store on Universal Music.

The DVD features the full concert performed (minus the Barbra Streisand intro). The DVD also featured bonus content of the music videos to the singles "Notorious" and "All Fired Up". Also, the bonus footage features remixes of the two videos, and the Behind The Headlines online episodes showing behind the scenes of the videos.

The concert was shown on Channel 4 throughout June and July 2011. Only 30 minutes of the show was shown. Six of the songs ("Higher", "Puppet", "Work", "Issues", "Forever Is Over" and "Ego") were shown in a 4Music documentary called The Saturdays: What Goes On Tour.

== Track listing ==
1. "Higher"
2. "One Shot"
3. "Up"
4. "Lose Control"
5. "Denial"
6. The Saturdays 24/7: The Best Bits Interlude
7. "Puppet"
8. "Work"
9. "Died in Your Eyes"
10. Rihanna Medley ("Love The Way You Lie (Part II)"/"What's My Name?"/"Only Girl (In the World)"
11. "If This Is Love"
12. Backstage Interlude
13. "Issues"
14. "Karma"
15. "Turn Myself In"
16. "Here Standing"
17. "Just Can't Get Enough"
18. "Forever Is Over"
19. "Missing You"
20. "Ego"
21. End

== Bonus features ==
1. Notorious
2. Notorious Almighty Remix Video.
3. Behind The Headlines: Notorious Behind The Scenes
4. All Fired Up
5. All Fired Up The Alias Remix Video.
6. Behind The Headlines: All Fired Up Behind The Scenes
