= Mollie King =

English radio presenter and singer (born 1987)

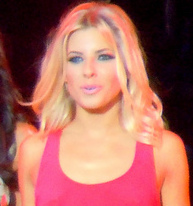
- King in 2011
- Born: Mollie Elizabeth King; 4 June 1987 (age 39); Wandsworth, London, England
- Partner: Stuart Broad (engaged)
- Children: 2
- Musical career
- Origin: London, England
- Genres: Pop; dance; electropop
- Occupations: Singer; songwriter; radio presenter
- Years active: 2004–present
- Labels: Polydor; Fascination; Island
- Formerly of: The Saturdays
- Website: mollieking.com

Mollie Elizabeth King (born 4 June 1987) is an English radio presenter, singer and songwriter who rose to fame as a member of girl group the Saturdays.

As part of the Saturdays, King has had 13 top 10 and eight top 5 singles, including the UK number-one hit "What About Us" on the UK Singles Chart and five top-ten albums on the UK Albums Chart. Before the Saturdays, King was a member of another girl group, Fallen Angelz, with whom she appeared on The X Factor. In 2015, King signed a solo deal with Island Records.

In August 2017, King was the first contestant announced for that year's series of BBC's Strictly Come Dancing, partnered with AJ Pritchard. King was eliminated in the semi-final in December 2017, finishing in fifth place. In April 2018, it was announced that King would join BBC Radio 1 to co-host a show with Matt Edmondson beginning in June on that year from Fridays to Sundays. As of 2024, they now co-host from Mondays to Thursdays.

== Life and career ==
=== Early life and career beginnings ===
King was born in Wandsworth, London, England, the youngest of three daughters born to Susan (née Wykes) and Stephen King. She attended Surbiton High School, in Kingston-upon-Thames, London. She has two sisters, Laura Ann (born 1983) and Ellen Catherine (born 1985). King had a successful skiing career and was on the Surbiton High Ski team with fellow pupil Chemmy Alcott.

By the age of 11, King was a member of the British Children's Ski Team resulting in her receiving a scholarship to the British Ski Academy. King later raced for Great Britain as one of the youngest on the team and later went on to ski for the British Alpine squad although she turned down a ski career to pursue her dream of becoming a singer. King achieved three As in her A levels, in Psychology, Business and Economics, and Sport in spite of having been diagnosed with dyslexia.

=== 2007–2015: The Saturdays ===
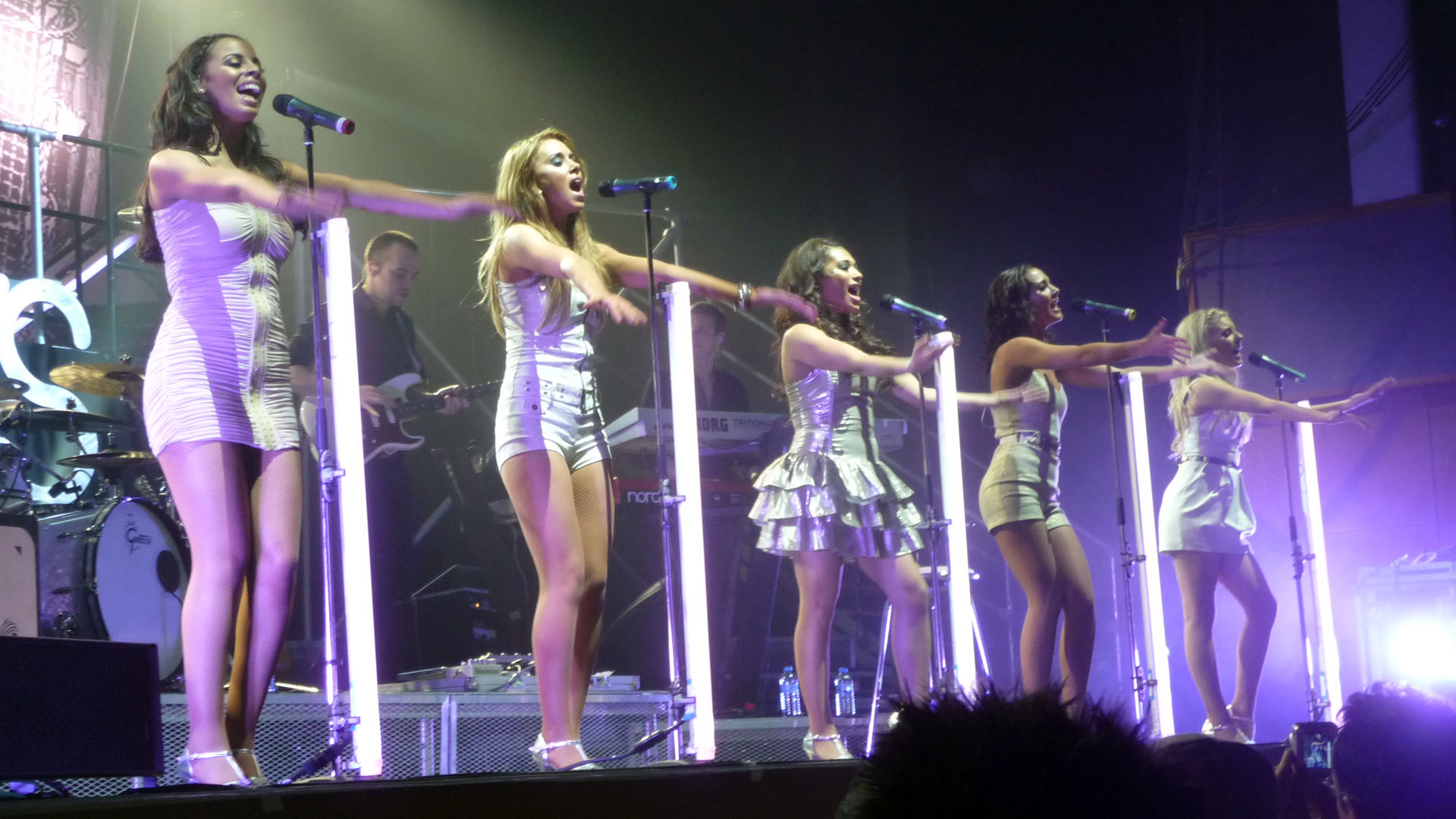
The Saturdays onstage, 2009

Since 2007, King was a member of girl group the Saturdays. The group achieved 13 top 10 hits, and four top 10 albums. They released their debut single "If This Is Love" in July 2008, and it peaked at number eight in the UK. The group released a second single, "Up" which charted at number five in the UK and later the song was given a silver disc in the United Kingdom. In late October 2008, the group released their first studio album Chasing Lights. It charted at number nine in the UK, and was certified platinum by the BPI. The group released a third single from the album, "Issues", which also went silver. The Saturdays released a cover of "Just Can't Get Enough" by Depeche Mode. The song debuted at number two in the UK, behind Flo Rida's "Right Round". The fifth and final single from the album was "Work", which was the first single by the group to fail to reach the top 20. The group later went on a tour entitled The Work Tour.

In October 2009, the group released a second studio album, Wordshaker, which charted at number nine and was given silver certification by the BPI. The first single, "Forever Is Over", charted at number two in the UK. The Saturdays appeared in advertisements for several products including a brand of deodorant, tampons, mobile phones, an operating system, and hair removal products. In early 2010, the girls released a second and final single from their second album, "Ego", which charted at number nine; the single gained a certification of silver by the BPI.

In summer 2010, the Saturdays released their first mini-album (their third album overall) Headlines!, which charted at number 3 in the UK and number 10 in Ireland. The group released their eighth single, "Missing You", which charted at number three in the UK and number six in Ireland. Rochelle Wiseman confirmed that the second single from the album would be "Higher". It was later confirmed, by the Saturdays' official website that Flo Rida had recorded vocals for "Higher". On Your Radar was the girls' third studio album, reaching a disappointing number 23 in the UK and spending only three weeks in the UK top 75, but featured the top-ten hits "All Fired Up" and "Notorious" as well as single, "My Heart Takes Over". In December 2011, the group went on their first headlining arena tour, the All Fired Up Tour!.

The Saturdays released the first single taken from their fourth studio album, "30 Days" in May 2012, which peaked at number seven. Later in the year, they temporarily moved from London to Los Angeles in the hope of breaking America. Helping increase their single sales in America, E! Network broadcast Chasing the Saturdays, a reality TV show following the girls during their three-month stay in America. The show premiered in January 2013, and was cancelled after one series. The Saturdays released "What About Us" (featuring rapper Sean Paul) in March 2013, which became their first number one single and was the biggest selling single of the year (at that point). Later on in the year, "Gentleman" and "Disco Love" were released, both charting in the top 15. Their album Living for the Weekend became the group's fourth top 10 album. The radio mix of "Not Giving Up" was released in April 2014 and was their seventeenth top 40 single. The group went on hiatus in 2014, and released a greatest hits album, Finest Selection: The Greatest Hits the same year. The only single released from the album, "What Are You Waiting For?" charted at number 38, making it their lowest-charting single to date.

=== 2015–present: Debut solo album ===
On 11 October 2015, King confirmed she had signed a solo deal with Island Records, with the intention of releasing a solo album in 2016. Her debut solo single, "Back to You", was released on 19 August 2016. On 24 August 2017, King announced that her new single, "Hair Down", would be released on 1 September.

Co-written by King, UK pop group Steps released "To the Beat of My Heart" as the fourth promotional track on 26 November 2020 from their sixth studio album What the Future Holds. The track is believed to be from the recording sessions from her scrapped debut solo album.

== Other endeavours ==
=== Television ===
King appeared in a number of episodes of Hollyoaks Later, along with Frankie Sandford. As a part of the Saturdays, she has appeared in the BBC series Myths. King has appeared in two episodes of bebo-based online show Sam King portraying herself as an ex-girlfriend. King also appeared in The King Is Dead on BBC Three and Never Mind the Buzzcocks in 2010. Along with her colleagues, King appeared on Ghosthunting with... where they look for paranormal activity. She also appeared in a reality TV show with her bandmates, known as The Saturdays: 24/7. On the show, the Saturdays performed exclusive tracks. In early 2013, the Saturdays appeared in another reality TV documentary about their lives, Chasing the Saturdays. The programme followed the girls as they tried to break into the American market after signing with Island Def Jam Records and Mercury Records. The show aired on TV network E! on Sunday nights. The US premiere received 914,000 viewers. Upon its premiere in the UK, the show received 72,000 views and became the network's most watched show of the week. In October 2013, King appeared as a panellist on an episode of Through the Keyhole. On 28 June 2014, King appeared, with the Saturdays, and competed in the celebrity edition TV show The Cube, where she reached the final round, but did not continue and won £100,000 for her chosen charity, the British Heart Foundation.

On 7 August 2017, King was the first contestant announced to be taking part in the fifteenth series of Strictly Come Dancing on BBC One. She was partnered with AJ Pritchard. On 10 December 2017, King was eliminated from the show's semi-final.

King guest-presented the children's television show Blue Peter on 8 January 2018 in place of usual host Radzi Chinyanganya. In January 2018, she stood in for Dan Wootton for a week on breakfast show Lorraine with the entertainment news. Throughout August, she presented This Morning alongside a variety of co-presenters including Ben Shephard, Matt Edmondson and Mark Wright and was the senior female relief presenter on the show.

=== Sponsorship deals and autobiography ===
It was revealed in 2009 that the Saturdays would be the new faces of hair removal product Veet. They later became the new faces of a major campaign for Impulse women's deodorant. The group recorded a television ad, which featured their songs "Forever Is Over" and "Ego". It was also dubbed "The Impulse Diaries". The TV content, which involved a sponsorship package on Channel 4, showed the girls in various settings, including a hotel room, a tour bus and backstage before a gig. This first aired on 23 October. The Saturdays also did a photoshoot, posing on a giant sofa as they launched T-Mobile's Big Sofa Night In campaign in London, England. The group sat on the sofa for more than 12 hours; the sofa was the size of a double decker bus. In 2013, King created a collection for Oasis Stores titled 'Loved by Mollie'. During September 2013, King designed shoes to help raise funds for UK charity Save the Children. King also was an ambassador for Maybelline during the Vodafone London Fashion Week. In 2017, King became the face of the Christmas campaign for Boux Avenue lingerie.

In early 2010, the Saturdays were going to publish their autobiography. King later announced that the autobiography would be titled The Saturdays: Our Story. The book was officially released on 25 October 2010. The Saturdays appeared at WH Smith in Bluewater for a book signing on 16 October 2010. The cover of their book cover had a similar cover to their Headlines! album and their The Headlines Tour due to them all being released around the same time. The book gives insight into the world of the Saturdays by telling the tale of their success. King has her own chapter in the book, in which she speaks about her love interests, their friendship within the group, and a personal insight into their lives before finding fame. The book also gives fashion and beauty tips, some gossip, accompanied by photos from the girls' own collection.

=== Philanthropy ===
It was announced that the Saturdays would record the 2009 Comic Relief charity single, which delayed the release of their fourth single, "Work". The group released a cover of Depeche Mode's "Just Can't Get Enough" for the charity on 1 March 2009. A week later, the song charted at number 2 on the UK Singles Chart making the group the first artist in 14 years for their Comic Relief single not to chart at number 1. In May 2010, the Saturdays teamed up with Manchester United and sang at a pre-match concert at Old Trafford. On 12 September 2010, the girls performed at the Help for Heroes charity concert with over 60,000 fans there. In March 2011, the group appeared at Westfield shopping centre with buckets and asked customers to part with their cash for Marie Curie, who provide home nursing, a helpline and hospices for end of life care. The Saturdays also performed at the Sunshine Concert which was held at the Troxy in London, to raise money for charity.

=== Radio ===
From February 2018, King co-hosted BBC Radio 1 every Saturday 1pm-4pm, alongside Matt Edmondson. In June 2018, King began co-hosting the show full-time alongside Edmondson on Fridays, Saturdays and Sundays.

In September 2018, King was nominated for Best New Presenter at the Audio and Radio Industry Awards (ARIAS).

King and Edmondson co-hosted the Radio 1 weekend breakfast show from November 2018 to January 2021. Since then, they moved back to the weekend afternoon show on Fridays to Sundays from 13:00-16:00 until May 2024, where they moved to weekdays, presenting between 13:00-15:30, on Monday to Thursdays, replacing Dean McCullough and Vicky Hawkesworth, who went on to host other Radio 1 shows separately.

King had previously presented Radio 1's Best New Pop from August 2019 to September 2022. Since then, she has also presented Future Pop. It was broadcast on Thursdays from 8-10pm, but from April 2024, it is broadcast on Wednesdays on the same slot.

== Personal life ==
In January 2010, it was announced that King was in a relationship with Lawson member Andy Brown. They broke up in February 2011. Following their split, Brown wrote the songs "When She Was Mine" and "Standing in the Dark" which he said were inspired by his break-up with King. In 2011, King began dating supermodel David Gandy, before ending the relationship in 2012. They rekindled their relationship in 2014, before ending it again in 2016. King is now engaged to England cricketer Stuart Broad. He proposed on 1 January 2021. In June 2022, King confirmed that she was expecting a baby with Broad and, in November 2022, announced the birth of their first daughter. King announced in August 2024 that she was pregnant with their second child and, in January 2025, announced the birth of their second daughter.

== Discography ==
=== Singles ===
Title	Year	Peak chart positions			Album
Title	Year	UK	UK Sales	SCO	Album
"Back to You"	2016	90	38	39	
"Hair Down"	2017	–	104	–	

=== Music videos ===
Single	Year	Director
"Back To You"	2016	Lisa Gunning
"Hair Down"	2017	Kyle Lewis

== Tours ==
The Saturdays

- The Work Tour
- The Headlines Tour
- All Fired Up Tour
- Greatest Hits Live!
