= Headlines Tour =

2011 concert tour by the Saturdays

Headlines! Tour
- Tour by The Saturdays
- Associated album: Wordshaker; Headlines!
- Start date: 2 February 2011
- End date: 2 March 2011
- No. of shows: 22

The Saturdays concert chronology
- The Work Tour (2009); Headlines! Tour (2011); All Fired Up! Live (2011)

The Headlines! Tour was the second headlining concert tour by English-Irish girl group the Saturdays. The tour consisted of dates in England, Scotland, Wales, Northern Ireland and, for the first time, the Republic of Ireland. The set list included songs from their two studio albums: Chasing Lights and Wordshaker, as well their first EP Headlines!. All dates sold out within one month.

== Background ==
The tour was officially announced on the Saturdays' official website. It is the groups's second headlining tour, after The Work Tour which included six sell-out dates. On 15 September 2010, the Saturdays tickets at Newcastle City Hall were declared all sold out, with over 2,000 tickets sold. It was announced that tickets to see the band at Rhyl Pavilion, Rhyl were sold out in under 2 hours and 50 minutes. Liverpool's Royal Liverpool Philharmonic sold out all its tickets late September 2010.

== Critical reception ==
The Headlines Tour gained positive reviews from critics. Evening Times reviewed the tour stating, Pop princesses the Saturdays would have wowed Glasgow audience any day of the week with their sell-out Headlines tour. [...] who wore sparkly, sequined outfits, to the Clyde Auditorium.

Kirstin Lynn of STV has mixed reviews of the tour. She first labelled the tour as a "pop sermon" with an audience made-up largely of teens and kids. The next thing she said was: "Finally, rising out of the bottom of the stage, The Saturdays are packaged as jeweled Barbies with their most recent hit 'Higher' and their dance routine better than their vocals in the fast paced number. With them ascending the stairs, which is mandatory in all pop stage performances, it becomes clear that, like horse racing, you root for the one you like to win." Then later stating Frankie Sandford was the Cheryl Cole of the group. She also spoke about the group's harmonies saying they their solo vocals are much stronger than their group harmonies. Then later cutting the band some slack by saying, though these are often sung whilst bounding around the stage, fun being a bigger concern for the vastly preteen audience than tuning.

Emma Kay of the Chronicle Live see started the review off by saying the Saturdays fans "just can't get enough", she then went on to say, A sell-out crowd packed Newcastle City Hall to see the girl band strut their stuff – and boy did they deliver! She stated that the group was in the process by saying "the audience was treated to a dazzling array of costumes with several changes, each outfit smaller than the last from short, leather dresses to hotpants and lots and lots of sequins." she complimented the girl's vocals by saying "As well as their singing, what they bring to the show is the real performance element – a strong sense of showmanship and energy."

== Concert synopsis ==
The show began with an intro which saw the Saturdays say names of people from the audience along to a backing track of "Barbra Streisand" by Duck Sauce. the song ends by hearing the girls laugh before Vanessa White says 'Here We Go' then the curtain drops and a video introduction begins which sees each individual member playing with camera after Flo Rida is heard saying each of their names. Once each of the members are shown, the group then rises onto the stage through a Trolley lift and opens the show with Higher. the group then performs 'One Shot which sees them perform choreography on the platform at the back of the stage. following a brief chat to the crowd they carry on with their second single Up. The girls then walk off stage as an extended intro to 'Lose Control' begins, when the vocals start, a door behind where the staircase stands in the middle (with the staircase now split on either side of the stage) opens to reveal the group sat on a bench similar to the one on the Headlines! album cover. Act 1 is then ended with 'Denial'.

A video interlude is then shown during the break of the group changing costume. The video named 'The Saturdays 24/7: The Best Bits', shown highlights from the group's ITV 2 documentary The Saturdays 24/7: The Best Bits' Once the video ended, 'Puppet' began and the screens open up revealing the girls stood in a huddle wearing white strings around their wrists to act as puppet strings. Work follows, to be continued with 'Died in Your Eyes'. The act is then continued with a Rihanna Medley containing Love The Way You Lie part 2 What's My Name? and Only Girl (In The World). If This Is Love saw the girls perform behind lighted frames that lowered from the roof of the venue.

A Video interlude shown the girls backstage rushing to get changed for the next act. Issues began the third section. This was followed by 'Karma'. A new song from the band's upcoming 3rd studio album called 'Turn Myself In' was sung, giving fans a taste of the new album, similar to what the group done on the work tour with performing 'One Shot' and Wordshaker. 'Here Standing' continued the show, with Just Can't Get Enough ending the penultimate section.

The encore consisted of the songs "Forever Is Over", "Missing You", and "Ego" before the Saturdays left the stage the final time through the stage lift.

== Support acts ==
- Twenty Twenty
- Six D
- Lawson

== Setlist ==
- "Higher"
- "One Shot"
- "Up"
- "Lose Control"
- "Denial"
- "Puppet"
- "Work"
- "Died in Your Eyes"
- Rihanna Medley: "Love the Way You Lie" / "Whats My Name?" / "Only Girl (In the World)"
- "If This is Love"
- "Issues"
- "Karma"
- "Turn Myself In"
- "Here Standing"
- "Just Can't Get Enough"

Encore

- "Forever Is Over"
- "Missing You"
- "Ego"

== Tour dates ==
Date(s)	City	Country	Venue
2 February 2011	Rhyl	Wales	Rhyl Pavilion
3 February 2011	Rhyl	Wales	Rhyl Pavilion
5 February 2011	Liverpool	England	Liverpool Philharmonic
6 February 2011	Glasgow	Scotland	Clyde Auditorium
7 February 2011	Newcastle upon Tyne	England	Newcastle City Hall
9 February 2011	Carlisle	England	Carlisle Sands Centre
10 February 2011	Manchester	England	Manchester O_{2} Apollo
11 February 2011	Sheffield	England	Sheffield City Hall
12 February 2011	Nottingham	England	Nottingham Royal Concert Hall
14 February 2011	Wolverhampton	England	Wolverhampton Civic Hall
15 February 2011	Brighton	England	Brighton Centre
17 February 2011	London	England	Hammersmith Apollo
19 February 2011^{[A]}	Oxford	England	Oxford New Theatre
20 February 2011^{[B]}	Southend-on-Sea	England	Cliffs Pavilion
21 February 2011^{[A]}	Leicester	England	De Montfort Hall
22 February 2011	Bristol	England	Colston Hall
24 February 2011	Plymouth	England	Plymouth Pavilions
25 February 2011	Cardiff	Wales	Motorpoint Arena Cardiff
26 February 2011	Bournemouth	England	Windsor Hall
28 February 2011^{[C]}	Belfast	Northern Ireland	Waterfront Hall
1 March 2011^{[C]}	Belfast	Northern Ireland	Waterfront Hall
2 March 2011	Dublin	Ireland	Olympia Theatre

^{A} Due to illness, Mollie was not able to perform at the Oxford and Leicester shows.
^{B} During the Southend show, Una had to leave the stage during the group's performance of "Denial" to get her inhaler. Mollie was still absent.
^{C} Due to illness, Frankie was not able to perform at either of the Belfast dates.

== Broadcast and recordings ==
The group's appearance at the London Hammersmith Apollo was filmed for a DVD release. During the showing of the group's second documentary for Channel 4 called What Goes on Tour, revealing what the group gets up to backstage on tour, five songs performed in the show was used but not all of the song was shown. Roughly only two minutes of each was previewed, giving fans a taster of what the DVD would be like. The five songs added in the documentary was; Higher, Puppet, Work, Issues, and Forever Is Over. A DVD of the show entitled Headlines! Live from the Hammersmith Apollo was available through the Saturdays official store within a Deluxe Fan edition boxset of their third studio album On Your Radar.
