= The Work Tour =

2009 concert tour by the Saturdays

- Tour by The Saturdays
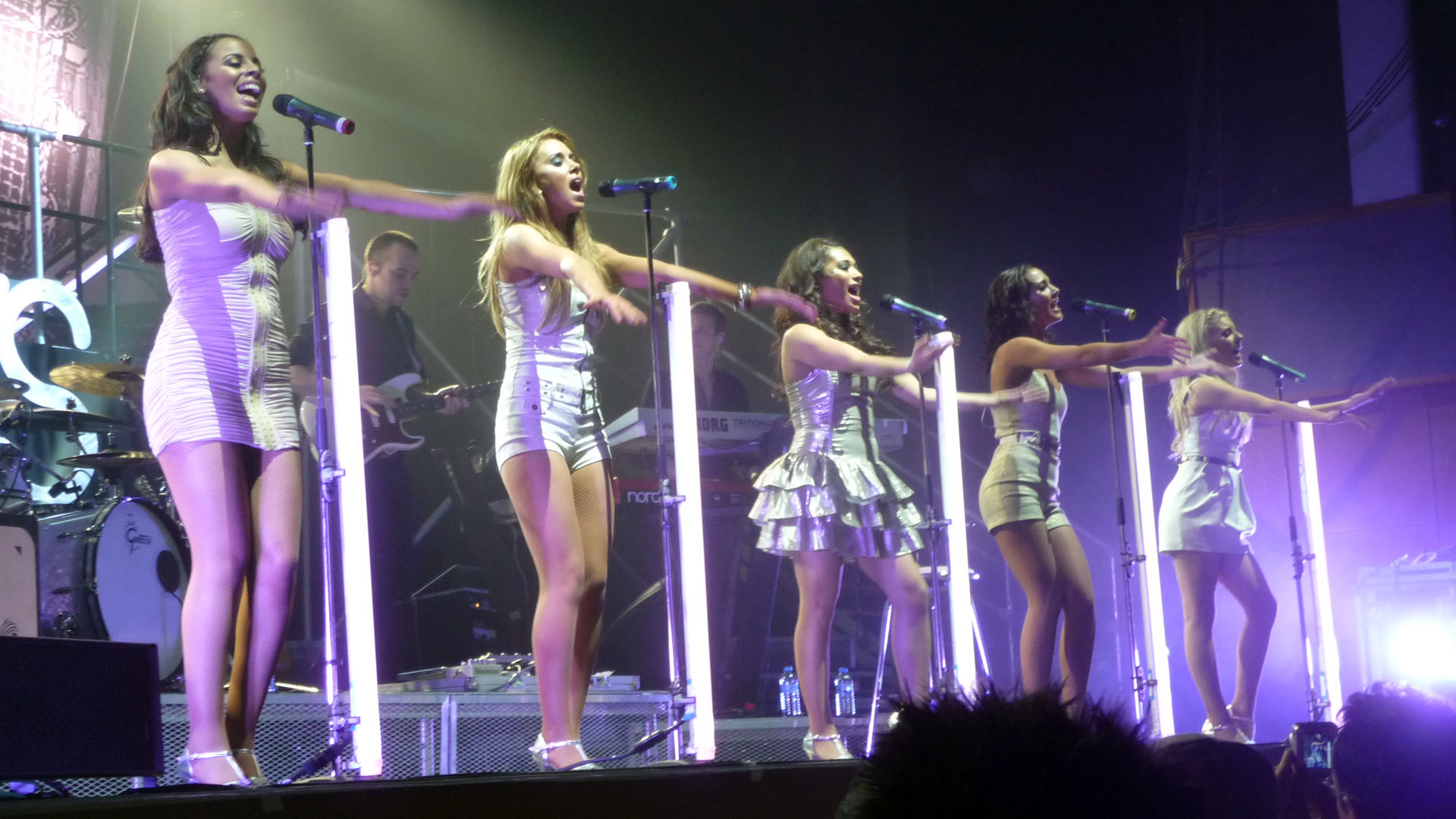
- Associated album: Chasing Lights
- Start date: 2 June 2009
- End date: 7 July 2009
- No. of shows: 24 in the United Kingdom

The Saturdays concert chronology
- The Work Tour (2009); Headlines Tour (2011)

The Work Tour was the debut headlining theatre tour by English-Irish girl group the Saturdays. The tour became the group's first headlining tour, but second time touring (after touring with Girls Aloud in 2008 as a support act for their Tangled Up Tour). The tour opened on 2 June 2009, and lasted for 24 shows, finishing on 7 July 2009. The tour featured all of their songs from their debut album (apart from "Vulnerable"), a medley of covers, and two new songs that would feature on their then untitled, and up-coming second studio album Wordshaker.

== Background ==
The tour was announced official by the Saturdays, to further promote their 2008 album Chasing Lights. The tour was named after the group's fifth single Work which release coincided with the tour. The fastest venue to completely sell out was the Brighton Dome.

== Concert synopsis ==
The concert began with a video interlude, which saw the group members individually walk down the catwalk on the set of the work video, this was played to an instrumental version of the Wideboys Remix of their single Up. The intro to their debut single If This Is Love began, and one by one different coloured lights appeared on each girl in turn. This was followed by Set Me Off. Keep her was next to be performed, before the girls brought chairs on stage to sing the comic relief single Just Can't Get Enough. They then performed Wordshaker, which was then unheard, and was to feature on their then upcoming album of the same name.

A Motown version of "Why Me Why Now" followed before the girls had a costume change. An extended intro of fall began, before the girls returned to the stage to perform the song. This was followed by an acoustic cover of Madcon's song Beggin' which came before an acoustic version of Chasing Lights. A video Interlude, was then played showing their video flip highlights, before they returned to stage to perform a covers medley, which consisted of the songs; Shut Up And Drive by Rihanna, I Kissed A Girl by Katy Perry, and So What by Pink. One Shot, another song to appear on their second album, was performed next. Lies continued the show, which was then followed by the tour's title song, Work. Work had an extended outro, which made the show appear to have ended.

Next, writing appeared on the video screen, asking if the crowd wanted more, before a musical interlude began signalling the start of the encore segment of the show with a selection of clips from the 'Issues' video. The girls then returned to the stage to perform the song, before ending the show with Up, as they danced with umbrellas.

== Opening acts ==
- Pixie Lott
- Mini Viva
- Jessie Malakouti

== Setlist ==
The Catwalk (Video Introduction) (Up Wideboys Remix Instrumental played by the band)

- costume: Black Anoraks
1. If This Is Love
- costume: Silver Outfits
2. Set Me Off
3. Keep Her
4. Just Can't Get Enough
5. Wordshaker (Album track off Wordshaker)
6. Why Me, Why Now? (Mowtown Remix)

Fall Extended Intro

- Costume: White Dresses
7. Fall
8. Beggin' (Acoustic version of Madcon single)
9. Chasing Lights (Acoustic version)

Video Flips Montage (Video interlude)

- costume: Black Tops, Ripped Jeans
10. Shut Up And Drive/I Kissed A Girl/So What
11. One Shot (Album track off Wordshaker)
12. Lies
13. Work

Encore

- Glitter Outfits in Different Colours
14. Issues
15. Up

^{A} Vanessa had a foot injury; she remained seated for part of the tour
^{B} At the final date of the tour, the group performed a short tribute to the late singer Michael Jackson after his death in June 2009, as they stated they had been watching the funeral service on TV before the show. McFly's Dougie Poynter joined the girls on stage, and played bass during "Just Can't Get Enough".

== Tour dates ==
Date(s)	City	Country	Venue
2 June 2009	Glasgow	Scotland	Clyde Auditorium
3 June 2009	Dundee	Scotland	Caird Hall
5 June 2009	Oxford	England	New Theatre Oxford
9 June 2009	Newcastle	England	Newcastle City Hall
10 June 2009	Norwich	England	UEA Auditorium
12 June 2009	Ipswich	England	Regent Theatre
13 June 2009	Cambridge	England	Cambridge Corn Exchange
14 June 2009	Bristol	England	Colston Hall
16 June 2009	Reading	England	The Hexagon
17 June 2009	Southend	England	Cliffs Pavilion
20 June 2009	Wolverhampton	England	Wolverhampton Civic Hall
21 June 2009	Southampton	England	Southampton Guildhall
23 June 2009	Manchester	England	Manchester Apollo
24 June 2009	London	England	HMV Hammersmith Apollo
25 June 2009	Brighton	England	Brighton Dome
27 June 2009	Sheffield	England	Sheffield City Hall
28 June 2009	Leicester	England	De Montfort Hall
29 June 2009	Liverpool	England	Liverpool Empire Theatre
1 July 2009	Plymouth	England	Plymouth Pavilions
2 July 2009	Swindon	England	Oasis Leisure Centre
3 July 2009	Cardiff	Wales	Cardiff International Arena
5 July 2009	Grimsby	England	Grimsby Auditorium
6 July 2009	Nottingham	England	Nottingham Royal Concert Hall
7 July 2009	Manchester	England	Manchester Apollo

== Broadcasts and recordings ==
None of the shows was filmed for a DVD or televised release/viewing. The only available footage is fan filmed videos uploaded on to YouTube. The group used the setlist from the Work Tour when they performed at the 2009 iTunes Festival, London. Six of the tracks (If This is Love, Just Can't Get Enough, Why Me, Why Now, Work, Issues and Up) featured on an EP released by the band called iTunes Live: London Festival '09. Three additional tracks (Chasing Lights, One Shot and Wordshaker) were iTunes bonus tracks for the band's second album, Wordshaker.
