= Fascination Records =

British record label

- Parent company: Universal Music Group
- Founded: 2006
- Status: inactive
- Distributors: Interscope-Geffen-A&M (In the US); Polydor Records (Outside the USA)
- Genre: Various
- Country of origin: UK

Fascination Records is a United Kingdom-based record label, owned by Universal Music Group, and operated as an imprint of Polydor Records. The label was launched in spring of 2006, and is managed by former TOTP Magazine editor Peter Loraine.

In 2010, Loraine announced he is setting up a management company, Fascination Management, while Fascination Records will continue as an imprint until 2014.

== Main artists ==
=== Pre-established artists ===
Girls Aloud

Having become the first all-girl group ever to score 20 consecutive Top 10 hits with their first set of releases (as part of Polydor), Girls Aloud are one of the most successful girls bands in the UK with all albums being certified platinum and having 4 number one singles. Girls Aloud moved to Fascination for the release of their greatest hits album The Sound of Girls Aloud which went quadruple platinum and selling over million copies in the UK, and its preceding singles "Something Kinda Ooooh" (no. 3), "I Think We're Alone Now" (no. 4) and non-album/Comic Relief single "Walk This Way" with Sugababes (no. 1). Their 4th studio album, Tangled Up was released on this label on 19 November 2007, and featured their 16th single, "Sexy! No, No, No..." (which reached no. 5), their 17th single, "Call the Shots", (which reached no. 3) and their 18th single, "Can't Speak French", (which reached no. 9). The girls' 5th studio album Out of Control, and 6th overall, was released via this label on 10 November 2008, and was preceded by their 19th single "The Promise", which was released on 20 October 2008. It entered at no. 1 on the UK singles charts, making it Girls Aloud's 19th consecutive top 10 hit and 4th no. 1 of their career. The second single from the album, "The Loving Kind" (co-written with the Pet Shop Boys) became their 20th consecutive top 10 hit upon its release in January 2009, and the final single, "Untouchable" was released on 27 April 2009 and became the group's first single to not reach the top ten in the UK, instead peaking at no. 11. The group got back together and released a new single, "Something New" for Children in Need which entered the charts at number 2. The group also released another greatest hits album entitled "Ten" which charted at number 9.

Cheryl Cole

As a member of Girls Aloud, on hiatus Cole released her debut album 3 Words in October 2009 to commercial success, where it was certified triple platinum for sales of over a million. Spawning European Hit "Fight For This Love", it also featured Australian hit, "3 Words". Cole released her second album in 2010, the following year, titled Messy Little Raindrops it preceded No. 1 Single, "Promise This" and second single "The Flood". Cole released her third studio album, A Million Lights 19 June 2012. The album's first single, "Call My Name", was released 10 June 2012 and quickly rose to the No. 1 spot.

Sophie Ellis-Bextor

Shooting to fame as the singer of Spiller's "Groovejet (If This Ain't Love)", Sophie went on to score a string of Top 10 singles. Her multi-platinum album Read My Lips peaked straightly to the UK Top and was a success throughout many European Countries and Australia. After the release of her second album, Shoot from the Hip, Sophie took a break from music to have a baby and to marry Richard Jones from The Feeling. She finished her third solo album in 2007 with the Fascination team, which was released on 21 May 2007. It is entitled Trip the Light Fantastic with the first single from it being "Catch You", released on 19 February 2007, becoming her 7th Top 10 Hit. Also, she released "Me and My Imagination", the second single from her third album, reaching the UK Top 40 again. Her third single released by Fascination was considered a flop, however. The album debuted inside the Top 10 in the first week of its release in the United Kingdom, and was certified as Gold a year later. Her collaboration with dance producers Freemasons on the track Heartbreak returned her to the UK top 20 in July 2009, and in May 2010, Bittersweet, the first single from Sophie's fourth album Make a Scene was released and gave her another top 30 hit, peaking at No. 26. She also embarked on her first UK tour in nearly eight years during December of that year.

Alphabeat

After scoring three UK top 20 hits in 2008 from their debut UK top 10 album Alphabeat, the Danish outfit signed a new UK record deal with Fascination in 2009 for the release of their second album. The Spell, retitled The Beat Is... for UK release, produced two UK top 30 hits: "The Spell", which reached No. 20 in October 2009, and "Hole in My Heart", which reached No. 29 in February 2010. The third single from the album, "DJ", however, failed to chart at all. Under Fascination, Alphabeat also completed two UK tours in 2009/2010.

Bananarama

Bananarama have signed a deal for a new album titled Viva. Viva is the tenth studio album recorded by the British vocal duo Bananarama. It was released by Fascination Records on 14 September 2009 in the UK. It contains the singles "Love Comes", "Love Don't Live Here" and other new tracks co-written by Dallin and Woodward, as well as 3 cover versions – "Rapture" (originally by iiO), "The Runner" (originally a 1979 hit for The Three Degrees) and "S-S-S-Single Bed" (originally by Fox).

The Saturdays

A five-piece girl group, The Saturdays consist of Frankie Sandford and Rochelle Wiseman, formerly of S Club 8, along with Mollie King, Una Healy and Vanessa White. They supported Girls Aloud on the tour for their Tangled Up album and fellow labelmates Jonas Brothers at one of their recent live dates in London. Their first single, "If This Is Love" was released on 28 July 2008 and peaked at number 9 on the UK Singles Chart. The follow-up single, "Up" was released on 13 October 2008 and peaked at number five in the UK Singles Chart. Up became their best selling single, shifting over 346,000 copies since its release. The debut album Chasing Lights was released on 27 October 2008 and received very favourable reviews from The Times and The Guardian. The album debuted at number 9 in the UK. In January 2009, The Saturdays released their third single "Issues". "Issues" peaked at number four in the charts after initially debuting at number six. The same month, Chasing Lights climbed the album charts to its new peak of number four.

In January 2009, the group's website announced the release of their fourth single, a cover of the Depeche Mode song "Just Can't Get Enough" as one of the official Comic Relief 2009 singles. It peaked at number two, marking this as one of their highest-charting single. From here, the band embarked on their own headlining tour – "The Work Tour", which coincided with the release of their fifth single "Work". "Work" peaked at number 22. The band then released their sixth single "Forever Is Over", which peaked at no. 2, equalling the success of "Just Can't Get Enough". A week later Wordshaker was released, peaking at number 9. They went on to release "Ego" which also peaked at number 9, however, becoming their second best selling single, with over 341,000 sales to date. The band released their eighth single "Missing You" which charted at number three and a mini-album Headlines!, which became their highest-peaking album to date reaching number three, beating the success of both début album Chasing Lights and second album Wordshaker. The Saturdays then went on to release their 9th single "Higher" which charted at number 10, becoming their 8th top 10 single.

In November 2011, the group released their fourth album On Your Radar spawning top 10 single Notorious which charted at number 8, top 5 single All Fired Up which charted at number 3 and top 20 single My Heart Takes Over, their first single to sell less than 100,000 copies and only their second to miss the top 10. The album went on to be certified Silver selling over 55,000 copies to date.

In 2012, the group released their first single from their fifth album Living for the Weekend; 30 Days which charted at number 7. After attempting to conquer the American music scene, The Saturdays then released their 14th single What About Us which became their first number 1 single in the UK and their highest selling single to date selling over 380,000 copies. The following single Gentleman missed the top 10 charting at 14.

=== Imports ===
Fascination handles the UK releases of several acts who are signed to USA label Hollywood Records

Jonas Brothers

Fascination are releasing the UK singles and albums for the three piece American pop rock group. Their debut UK single, "SOS" was released in June 2008 and peaked inside the UK top 20 at no. 14. Their self-titled debut UK album was also released in this month and reached the UK top 10 album chart at no. 9. Their second UK single release is the double-a-side "Burnin' Up"/"When You Look Me in the Eyes". The single was released on 22 September 2008 and peaked at no. 30, followed a week later on 29 September 2008 by their new album A Little Bit Longer which peaked at UK no. 19 in the album chart.

Miley Cyrus

The Hannah Montana teen star released her debut album Breakout in the UK with Fascination in 2008. On 9 November 2009 she released her new album The Time of Our Lives, with the lead single being "Party in the USA".

Demi Lovato

The Camp Rock star is releasing her music in the UK with Fascination. Her first UK release was "La La Land" from Don't Forget, it peaked at 36 on the UK Top 40. She released her second album on 5 October 2009 called Here We Go Again. Her fourth album Demi was released in May 2013 charting at No. 10, which was preceded by the No. 3 charting single Heart Attack

Selena Gomez & the Scene

The Wizards of Waverly Place star's band released their hit single "Naturally" on 12 April 2010 and their album Kiss & Tell the following week, the single debuted and peaked at 7 on the UK Top 40 and the album at no. 12.

=== Television tie-ins ===
Connie Fisher, the winner of the BBC1 show How Do You Solve A Problem Like Maria? released her debut album Favourite Things on Fascination on 9 October 2006. Her debut album peaked no. 14 on the UK Albums Chart.

As with Fisher, Lee Mead, the winner of BBC1's Any Dream Will Do has been signed to this label. His debut single of the same name entered on downloads at no. 18 before peaking at no. 2 the following week behind "Umbrella" by Rihanna feat. Jay-Z. Fascination also released his self-titled debut album in November 2007, which peaked inside the Top 20 of the UK Albums Chart, and his two download only singles "Gonna Make You A Star" and "You and Me".

Fascination announced that had signed the fictional band Dirty Diegos, who feature in Channel 4 soap Hollyoaks. Their official MySpace was launched on 23 October 2008 and has a 60-second preview of their debut single, "Play", which was released digitally on 23 November 2008 in the UK.

== Soundtracks and compilations ==
Mamma Mia! The Movie Soundtrack

The soundtrack to the film version of the ABBA musical was released through Fascination in July 2008. The cast's cover of "Gimme! Gimme! Gimme! (A Man After Midnight)" was released digitally as a single in July 2008.

Britannia High

Fascination in collaboration with Globe (the TV production arm of Universal Music Group) and ITV1 released the soundtrack to this new Fame-style TV series, that went to air in the UK on 26 October 2008. The first single and theme tune to the series, "Start of Something", which has been written by Take That star Gary Barlow is available to download for free from the official programme website.

Skins

The soundtrack to the Channel 4 drama series was released on this label in September 2007.

St. Trinians

The soundtrack to this film (which featured the label's own Girls Aloud singing the theme from the film) was released through Fascination in December 2007. Fascination also released the soundtrack for its 2009 sequel, St. Trinian's 2: The Legend of Fritton's Gold, which featured contributions from Fascination artists such as The Saturdays and Girls Aloud's Sarah Harding and five new songs produced by Xenomania from The "Banned" of St. Trinian's – who released their debut and only single, Up & Away for digital download on 30 November 2009.

Popjustice

The Popjustice compilation album, Popjustice: 100% Solid Pop Music, has also been released on this label.

== Former artists ==
Tokio Hotel

The German punk pop band released their debut UK single "Ready, Set, Go!" under the label on 27 August 2007 but could only reach no. 77, and were dropped from their label in April 2008.

Paul Steel

Singer songwriter Paul Steel was touted by the Sunday Times as one to watch. He released a debut, 10 track EP entitled April And I in March 2007 and released debut single "Your Loss" on 3 September, which failed to chart. Debut album 'Moon Rock' and the follow-up single 'I Will Make You Disappear' were cancelled for release and he was dropped in April 2008.

Girls Can't Catch

Girls Can't Catch are the newest artists to join Fascination Records. They have released a song, "Keep Your Head Up", on 3 August 2009, and peaked at no. 26 on the UK Singles Chart, their second single "Echo" peaked in the top 20. It was reported on 12 July 2010 that the band had been dropped by their record label.

== See also ==
- List of record labels
