= The Saturdays =

British-Irish girl group

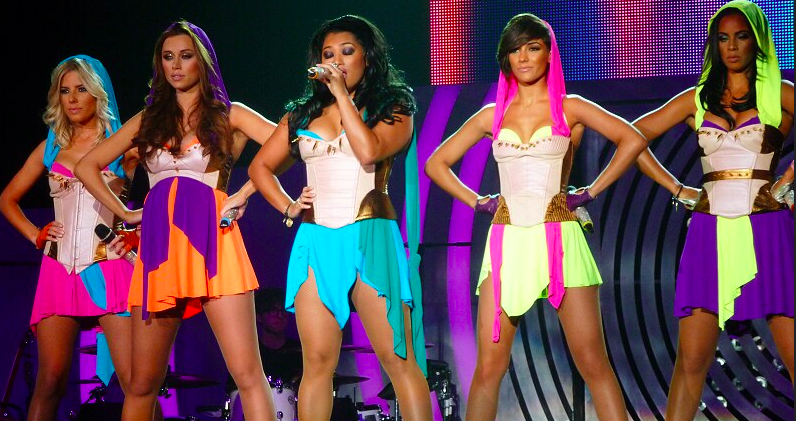
- The Saturdays performing in December 2011 (L–R: Mollie King, Una Healy, Vanessa White, Frankie Bridge and Rochelle Humes)

Background information
- Origin: London, England
- Genres: Pop; dance-pop; electropop
- Works: The Saturdays discography
- Years active: 2007–2014 (Note: Indefinite hiatus)
- Labels: Polydor; Fascination; Geffen; Mercury
- Past members: Frankie Bridge; Mollie King; Rochelle Humes; Una Healy; Vanessa White
- Website: thesaturdays.co.uk

The Saturdays were an English-Irish girl group based in London, England. The group formed during the summer of 2007 and separated in 2014. The lineup consisted of Frankie Bridge, Una Healy, Rochelle Humes, Mollie King, and Vanessa White. They were formed through Fascination Records, a sub-division of Polydor Records, which gave them an instant record deal with the label. As soon as the contract was finalised, the Saturdays went on tour with Girls Aloud during their Tangled Up Tour. The group's music style is pop, but throughout their career, their management has experimented with dance-pop and electropop. Songwriters and producers Ina Wroldsen, Steve Mac, Camille Purcell, and Quiz & Larossi have helped create their music.

In July 2008, The Saturdays released their debut single and first Top Ten hit, "If This Is Love". Their debut album, Chasing Lights, released the same year, charted at number nine on the UK Albums Chart; it was certified platinum by the BPI and produced three more top ten singles: "Up", "Issues", and "Just Can't Get Enough". "Work" was also released from the album. The group's first concert tour, The Work Tour, took place in 2009. The group's second album, Wordshaker, produced the Top Ten hits "Forever Is Over" and "Ego". In 2010, the Saturdays released a mini album, Headlines!, which contained the top 10 hits "Missing You" and "Higher", the latter of which featured guest vocals from Flo Rida. The mini-album was supported by the group's second concert tour, The Headlines Tour. Their third album, On Your Radar, was released in 2011 and resulted in two top 10 singles: "Notorious" and "All Fired Up".

In 2011, the group tackled its first arena tour, All Fired Up! Live, in support of their third album, "On Your Radar". Their fourth album, "Living for the Weekend", was released in 2013. The album's first single, "30 Days", charted at number seven on the UK Singles Chart. The follow-up single, "What About Us", became the Saturdays' first UK number-one single, selling 114,000 copies in the first week of release. Although "Gentleman" followed as the next single, it was "Disco Love" that entered the UK charts at number five, becoming their thirteenth Top Ten hit. The album debuted at number ten on 20 October 2013 becoming their fourth top 10 album. The Saturdays released their first greatest hits album, Finest Selection: The Greatest Hits, on 11 August 2014. It was preceded by a single, "What Are You Waiting For?", which was available to download on 9 August 2014. The Saturdays embarked on their Greatest Hits Live! tour in September 2014. The Saturdays have sold over five million records in the UK and Ireland.

== History ==
=== 2007–2009: Formation, Chasing Lights and The Work Tour ===
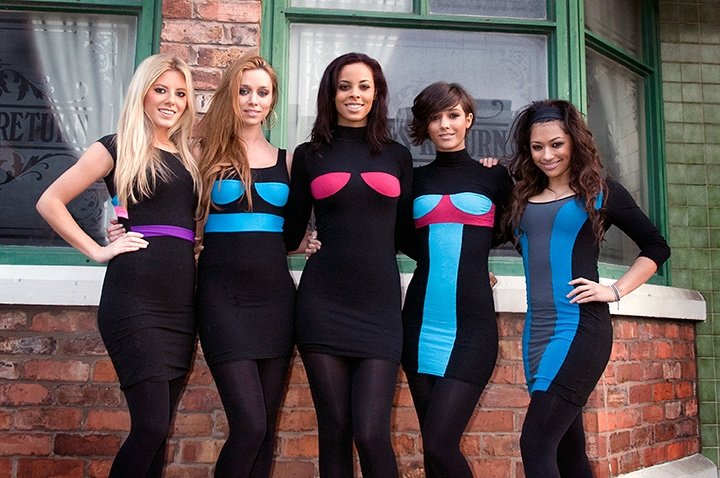
The Saturdays on Coronation Street in 2009

The Saturdays were formed in June 2007, after auditions were held to find members for the group. The group was put together through the record label Polydor Records which meant they would have an instant record deal and were signed to Fascination Records, a sub-label of Polydor. The group began recording their debut album while touring with Girls Aloud on their Tangled Up Tour. They were also offered songs that were rejected by Girls Aloud. They said "We all thought it was a bit of a cheek. Why would we want their rejects? [...] It's bad enough with all the comparisons being made." Whilst on tour with Girls Aloud, the group released their first single "If This Is Love". The song features additional backing vocals from Danish singer Nabiha. The song charted at number eight on the UK Singles Chart after it sold 14,990 copies in its first week of release. The single was also the second-highest new entry of the week behind Katy Perry's "I Kissed a Girl" which debuted at number four. As well as supporting Girls Aloud, the Saturdays also supported the Jonas Brothers at their Hammersmith Apollo show.

Their debut album, Chasing Lights was released in October 2008 and peaked at number 9 on the UK Albums Chart. Later the album was certified Platinum by the British Phonographic Industry. The last track of Chasing Lights, "Why Me, Why Now" was originally a demo by Alex Cartañá, but was later picked up by the girls. The Saturdays were often compared to other British female acts such as the Sugababes and Girls Aloud, however, they have been praised for their debut album. "Up" was confirmed to be the second single from the album and the first studio version of "Up" premiered on Popjustice on 17 July 2008 in the form of a short clip, after the group previously performed the song, when it was being recorded, live at various gigs in the United Kingdom. The song then officially premiered in full on 31 August 2008 on BBC Radio 1. On 19 October 2008 "Up" debuted at number five on the UK Singles Chart with first-week sales of 26,593. In turn outspeaking and outselling the previous single "If This Is Love" which debuted at number eight with first-week sales of 14,990. The third single was released "Issues" which became a commercial success after charting at number four. Both "Up" and "Issues" found themselves gaining a certification of Silver by the British phonographic industry. In March 2009 the Saturdays released a cover of Depeche Mode's "Just Can't Get Enough" for Comic Relief, the single was a success and charted at number two on the UK Singles Chart and was also certificated Silver by the BPI. "Work" was released as the fifth and final single from the album and was their first single to miss the top ten on the Singles Chart.

Their first headlining tour, The Work Tour, had 27 dates. McFly's Dougie Poynter, Sandford's boyfriend played bass guitar during "Just Can't Get Enough". White tripped on some wires backstage and had a foot injury, she remained seated on stage for some shows. In 2008 and 2009, the Saturdays appeared in adverts for several products including a brand of deodorant, tampons, mobile phones, an operating system, and hair removal products. The band was named as a model for the hair removal product, Veet. The band later became the new face of a major campaign of Impulse women's deodorant. The Saturdays said that fashion is a huge part of the group, saying people look up to them as their icons.

=== 2009–2010: Wordshaker and Headlines! ===
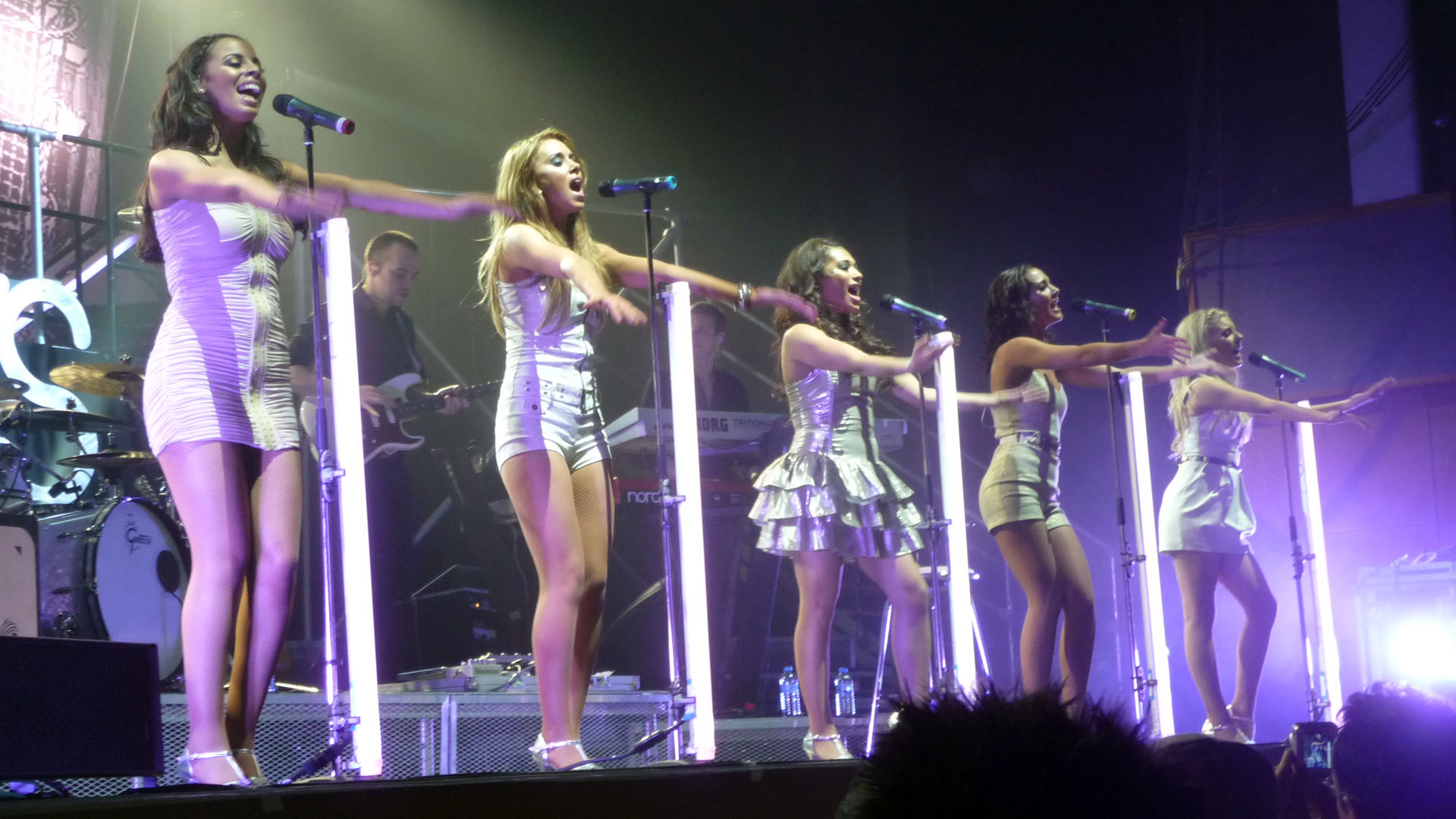
The Saturdays performing at the Civic Hall in Wolverhampton in June 2009

Whilst performing on their first headlining tour, The Work Tour, the group started to go back into the studio to record their second studio album in early March 2009, which would be due for release in late 2009. The group performed two songs from the recording sessions at The Work Tour : "One Shot" and "Wordshaker" which later would appear on the album. The official cover was revealed in a special mailer to fans on the group's official form/website on 23 September 2009. The band began working with a number of writers and producers, including Louis Biancaniello, Chris Braide, Jörgen Elofsson, Quiz & Larossi, Steve Mac, Per Magnusson and Norwegian songwriter Ina Wroldsen who has previously written for the group, as well as working with the Pussycat Dolls, Pixie Lott and Leona Lewis. "Forever Is Over" was released as the lead single from the group's second studio album and was originally written for former American Idol winner Kelly Clarkson by former Busted member James Bourne and production group the Runaways. The single was also wanted by American pop rock artist, Pink. "Forever Is Over" charted at number-two on the UK Singles Chart. Wordshaker was released in October 2009. The album had almost identical peaks to their first studio album with the album peaking at number nine on the UK Albums Chart and thirty-six on the Irish Albums Chart. The album also gained a certification of Silver by the BPI. "Ego" was released as the second and final single from the album, which was written by Steve Mac and Ina Wroldsen. Mac also acknowledged the influence of producer RedOne's work with Lady Gaga. "Ego" charted at number nine and number ten on the UK and Irish Singles Charts and later gained a Gold certification by the BPI.

The Saturdays originally intended not to release any material in 2010, but Rochelle Humes explained in an interview with Digital Spy that "[they]'d come across some songs that [they] were really excited about. [...] [so they] wanted to just get everything out [then]." "We finished [Wordshaker] and we'd come across some songs that we were really excited about. The songs that we had found were so current, and we'd written a couple of songs ourselves, [so] we wanted to just get everything out now." The band confirmed that the album would not be a studio album and would in fact be an Extended play. The group confirmed to be working with Steve Mac and Ina Wroldsen on the album as well as some new producers. "Missing You" was confirmed to be the first single released from the EP. "Missing You" is an electro song incorporating elements of trance. It was written by Lukas Hilbert and Alexander Kronlund. The music video was shot at the end of May 2010, in Málaga, Spain and later premiered on 26 June on the group's official website. "Missing You" entered the UK Singles Chart at number three. After Headlines! was released it charted at number three on the UK Albums Chart and number ten on the Irish Singles Chart, marking the group's third UK top-ten album and their first in Ireland. "Higher" was confirmed to be the second single from the EP. After the group's previous single "Missing You" was beaten to number one for a second time by Flo Rida, Wiseman joked that the group would have to record a song with the rapper before they could top the UK Singles Chart. Then several days later it was confirmed that a collaboration had gone ahead with Flo Rida recording vocals for one of the group's songs. The single charted at number-ten on the UK Singles Chart and number-eleven on the Irish Singles Chart.

=== 2011–2012: On Your Radar and All Fired Up! Live ===
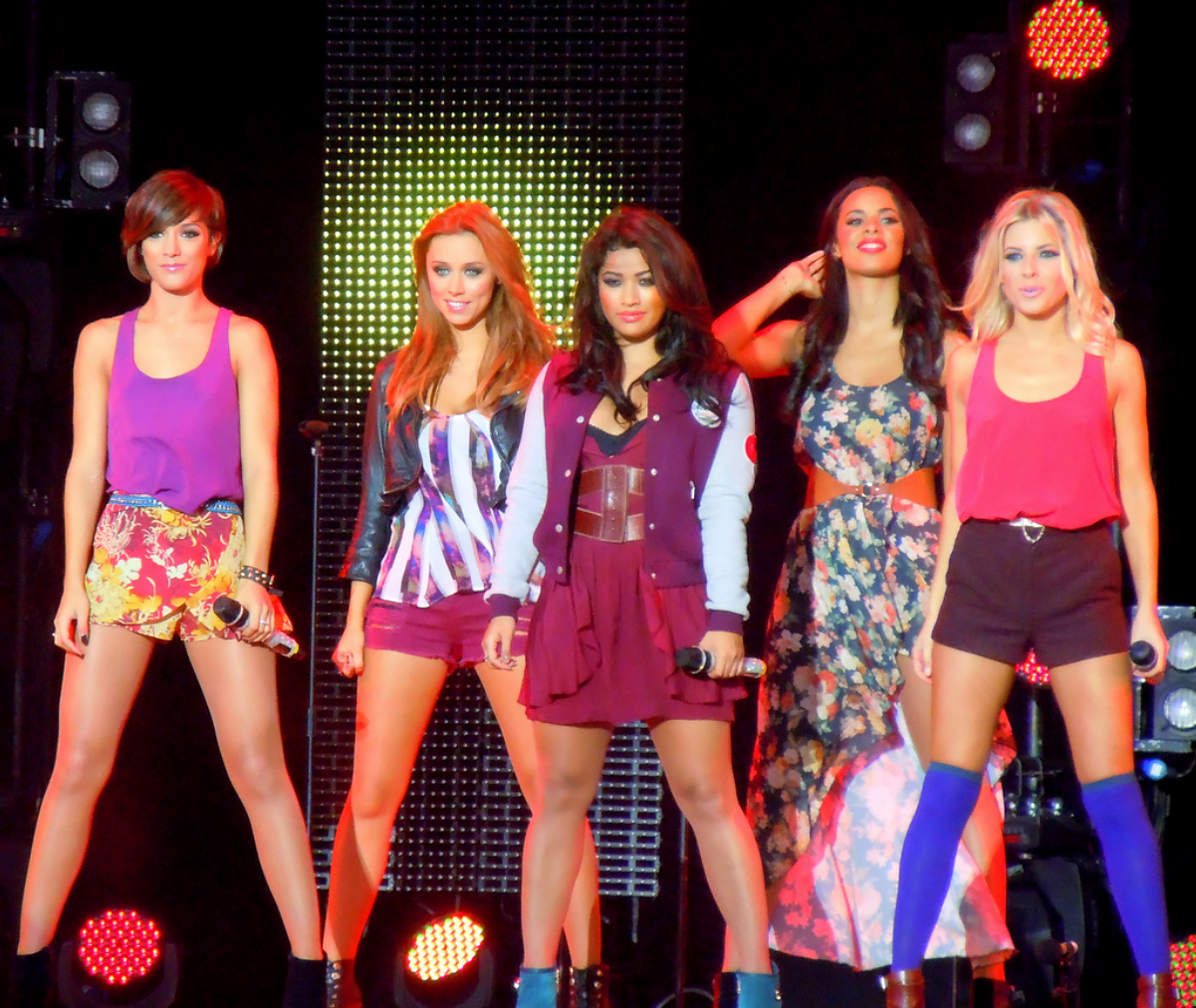
The Saturdays performing at Sainsbury's Super Saturday in September 2011

The group announced that they were working on their third full-length studio album in late 2010. While recording the album they worked with a variety of collaborators for the album, including producers Lucas Secon, Labrinth Danish pop band, Alphabeat, Taio Cruz, Space Cowboy, Carl Falk, Rami Yacoub, and Steve Mac. Wiseman confirmed that the record was "different" and "fierce". The Saturdays promised that their third studio album would be different and they would be taking risks in their music. They announced that their new sound is "dance floor" music. The group confessed that the album would be a lot "sexier" and a lot more R&B than their previous albums. The band confirmed that they have written the majority of the album themselves which makes the album a lot more personal to them. They said that the new album is; "it's a very cool". The band said their new music was "current", "fun", "naughty", "girly" and "dancy". Emeli Sandé said that she wrote a track for the group which was very dark and a strong ballad. She said that the lyrics are dark and very honest. The first single released from the album was "Notorious". The single was released digitally on 22 May 2011 in the UK. The single peaked at number 8 on the UK Singles Chart and 19 on the Irish Singles Chart. After the release of "Notorious" the band released a clothing line with high street store, Miss Selfridge. The group-designed T-shirts will feature lyrics from the group's songs "Notorious" and "Higher". "All Fired Up" was released on 4 September 2011, which charted at number-three on the UK Singles Charts and six on the Irish Singles Charts. It was confirmed that the album would be titled On Your Radar, and the third single released would be "My Heart Takes Over".

After the conclusion of The Headlines Tour, the Saturdays confirmed that they would go on tour again in December 2011, although this time it would be an arena tour, instead of a theatre tour like their two previous headlining tours. They also revealed that they are going to "fly" during the tour as it is a dream for the band. It was confirmed that the tickets would be released on Monday 13 June 2011 and tour would be titled All Fired Up! Live. There has been 11 dates confirmed [so far]. They said "It's an arena tour so we're forced to go all out for a big production." Mollie King said that fans should expect a lot of bright colours and brightly coloured blocks for the production. The Saturdays later revealed in late June Irish tour dates. The girls confirmed during an interview with Capital FM that their new single, "30 Days" would be "very pop", "amazing" and "crazy". The single was premiered on 30 March 2012 on BBC Radio 1's breakfast show with Chris Moyles. The video premiered on 5 April 2012. It was further confirmed that the group were working on their fifth album.

=== 2012–2013: Chasing the Saturdays and Living for the Weekend ===
The group began work on their fifth overall release, with first single "30 Days" released in May 2012 and would serve as the lead single from their upcoming fourth studio album. Rochelle Humes explained the concept of the single, "It's a really amazing, catchy song but the sentiment behind it is being all excited and counting down the days to seeing someone when you've really been missing that person." The single charted at number seven on the UK Singles Chart, which gained the band their eleventh top ten single. It was announced that the Saturdays had signed to Island Def Jam and Mercury Records to release future music in the United States. "What About Us" was released as the group's first worldwide single. In order for the group to introduce themselves to the American public, the group released extended play, Chasing the Saturdays, which was released only in America and Canada. The Saturdays also star in a reality series called Chasing the Saturdays which premiered on E! on 20 January 2013. The show features the group trying to make it in America. Upon its premiere in the United Kingdom, Chasing the Saturdays became that week's No. 1 most watched show with 72,000 viewers, having 10,000 more viewers than Kourtney and Khloé Take Miami.

After its UK release, it was reported that "What About Us" was on course to knock Justin Timberlake's "Mirrors" off the number-one spot on the UK Singles Chart on 24 March. During the midweek charts, the group were 30,000 copies ahead of Timberlake's track. The Saturdays revealed that they were due to call their upcoming fourth studio album The Chase, but decided against the title. They also revealed that they would release another single from the album before the release of it. Aston Merrygold tipped the band to be the "biggest UK girl-group". "What About Us" charted at number-one on the UK Singles Chart, gaining the Saturdays their first number-one single, selling 114,000 copies in the first week of release and also becoming the fastest selling single of 2013. The Saturdays sold 40,000 copies more than their nearest competitor to keep them off the number-one spot, which was Timberlake.

In March 2013, it was reported that the next track to be taken from Living for the Weekend would be titled "Gentleman", with the Daily Mirror reporting that body doubles had been hired to appear alongside the five girls in the accompanying video. On 2 May 2013, Sandford announced through her Twitter account that she and her fiancé, Wayne Bridge, were expecting their first child together. On 4 May, it was confirmed that the album's third single would be the previously rumoured track, "Gentleman". A fifteen-second preview of the single was posted with the announcement, and the full track received its radio premiere on 9 May 2013. On 25 July, the Saturdays confirmed that the next single would be "Disco Love". The single was released on 6 October. The single charted at number five on the UK Singles Chart. On 4 September, the album's track list was revealed via Twitter along with the album's title, Living for the Weekend. The album was released on 14 October 2013, and charted at number 10 on the UK album charts, making it their fourth top ten album to date. The album's fifth single was "Not Giving Up".

=== 2014: Finest Selection: The Greatest Hits and hiatus ===
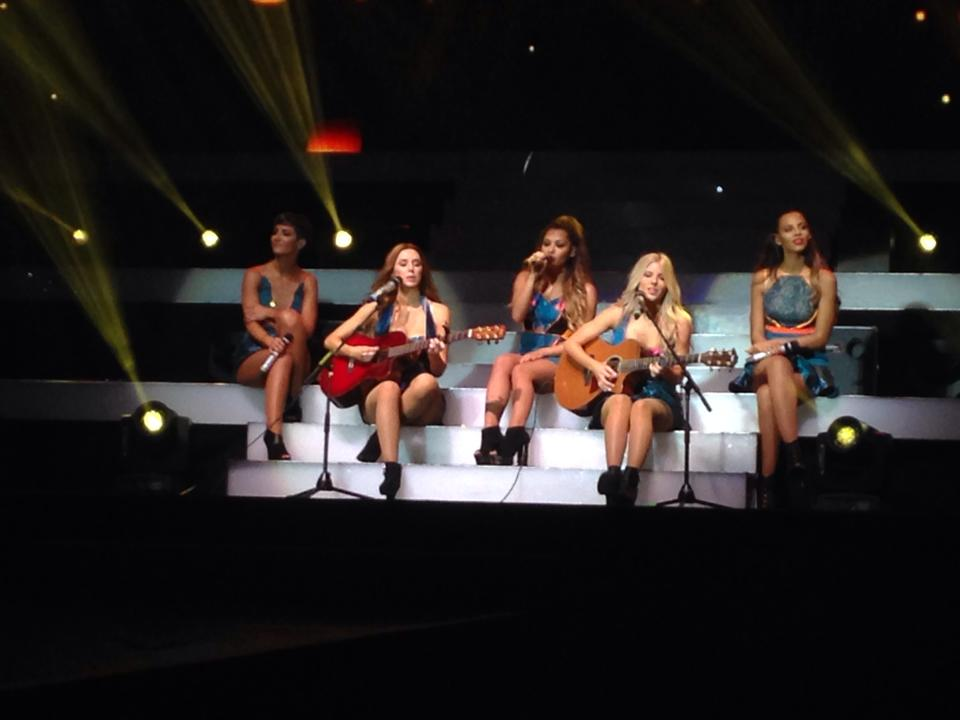
The Saturdays performing during their Greatest Hits Live! tour in September 2014

The Saturdays embarked on a Greatest Hits tour 'Greatest Hits Live!' tour in September 2014, playing 12 venues across Scotland, England and Ireland. and released Finest Selection: The Greatest Hits with all their singles plus three new songs; "What Are You Waiting For?", "808" and "Walking Through the Desert". Bridge said during an interview that, "this is not the end." Humes also said, "when we do split up our greatest hits album would be four discs long!" Vanessa White added, "we hope to release another greatest hits album in three years time."

On 14 June 2014, it was announced that the first single taken from the album would be titled, "What Are You Waiting For?", produced by previous collaborators Xenomania. The single debuted at number 38 on the UK Singles Chart, their lowest charting single to date, while the album debuted at number 10 on the UK Album Chart. The girls also dropped a remix of "808" with American rap-artist, Angel Haze.

On 2 December 2014, the Saturdays announced that they created a cover of the Waitresses' song "Christmas Wrapping" for the film Get Santa. This song later appeared on the Christmas edition of "Pop Party" called Pop Party Christmas.

On 22 March 2015, in an interview with the Irish Independent, Mollie King revealed that the group was on hiatus and will not be releasing any new music until at least 2016. She is quoted as saying that the band will "be recording another album after Christmas so we are doing our own things this year." On 11 May, in an interview with the Daily Mirror, Frankie Bridge stated that the Saturdays would be heading back into the recording studio later in the year to begin work on new material. She is quoted as saying "We're recording again this year, which will be great as we all genuinely get on. The reason we've stayed together so long is we have the freedom to do our thing, have time with our families then come back together.".

On 31 March 2017, White confirmed that she had no plans to go back to the Saturdays anytime soon, furthering their hiatus. While promoting her debut country music album The Waiting Game, Una Healy also confirmed that the band had no current plans anytime soon. On 1 April 2017, it was reported that White had no plans to reform with the group, as she was focusing on her solo career. In September 2017, King hinted that the group could make a comeback in the near future.

== Other ventures ==
=== Filmography ===
In mid-2008, the Saturdays made a cameo appearance in Hollyoaks Later. The group was featured performing in the episode and were also featured talking to the cast members, their "fans". In 2009, they appeared in an episode of BBC TV series "Myths" which was their first acting role as a band. They played a singing group called the Syrens in a modern version of The Odyssey, with Una Foden as "Peisone". In 2010, the Saturdays filmed a documentary series, The Saturdays: 24/7, for ITV2, which witnessed the group touring while promoting the upcoming release of their single "Missing You", and recording sessions for their first extended play, Headlines!. The documentary had six episodes. The group later announced that the show aimed to prove that there is no bitchiness in the group like the papers always rumour. "You always see in the papers, that me and girls are always arguing, we really don't, and there is no bitching at all." In the first episode of The Saturdays: 24/7 the band were shown gigging around the UK, without King, after she was taken ill after being bitten by a horse-fly The show was a success and later the band confirmed another show, The Saturdays: What Goes On Tour, which was also a six-part fly on the wall documentary for Channel 4. The programme featured the girls on tour and what happens on tour with the group and promotional activities including beginning to record their third studio album. The Saturdays then appeared in an episode of Ghosthunting with... towards the end of 2010, in which Yvette Fielding guided them through haunted locations. The Saturdays later released a DVD of them performing on tour, titled The Saturdays: Headlines Live! which was only included with the Deluxe Fan Edition of On Your Radar.

Before the group, Frankie Bridge (then Sandford) and Rochelle Humes (then Wiseman) were regular cast members in children's musical television comedy, I Dream, where they appeared along with other members from S Club 8. The programme, aimed at (and mostly about) teenagers, which aired in 2004 (see 2004 in British television). It was set at an esteemed performing arts college near Barcelona, Spain, and focuses on thirteen youths who are invited to enroll at the college, Avalon Heights, over the summer. Mollie King appeared on The X Factor as a solo act and in a group in a bid to find fame as a singer. Vanessa White made common appearances on Almost Famous as well as a Cheesestrings advert.

=== Chasing the Saturdays ===
It was announced that the group's management were in talks with a number of different American network television programmes to broadcast a reality television series, which would feature the group's day-to-day lives. It was later announced that the Saturdays had signed a contract for their show to be shown through, E! and their programme would be titled Chasing the Saturdays. The series was available on E! and later available on MTV. The series was 10 episodes long and was first broadcast on 10 January. The iTunes download included an extra-minute snippet of the show back in London and was only if you bought the entire series through iTunes.

All of the members of the Saturdays have appeared on the BBC Three late-night panel show Sweat the Small Stuff. Humes was a regular panel member in series 1, and a team captain in series 2. In the second half of series 1 (from June 2013), Rochelle was on maternity leave, and each of the other Saturdays replaced her in the later episodes.

=== Testimonials ===
In 2010 the Saturdays each contributed their part to a book The Saturdays: Our Story an autobiography which was released on 25 October 2010. The book was written with a ghostwriter and published by the Transworld imprint Bantam Press. The group also began a book signing tour starting at WH Smith in Bluewater. The book gives an insight into the world of each band members, where they explain the success with the band and before their lives in the group (Humes and Bridge's case their time in S Club 8). They also talk about they love life, their friendship within the group and a personal insight before they found fame. They give fashion and beauty tips throughout the book and gossip accompanied by photos from each other group's own collection. The Saturdays became the new face of hair removal products brand Veet in 2009. In 2010 the Saturdays became the face of Impulse, a body fragrance range. They became ambassadors for Nintendo 3DS game, Nintendogs + Cats prior to the release of their third studio album, taking over from Girls Aloud. The Saturdays also worked with Fashionista to release a new brand of nail varnish, which was launched in Superdrug.

=== Philanthropy ===
All five of the members have been involved in charity work. The Saturdays released a cover of Depeche Mode's "Just Can't Get Enough". The single was released on 1 March 2009 in aid to 2009's Comic Relief. The song debuted at number-two making the groups the first artist to miss the number-one spot with a Comic Relief single. However, the single out sold the original version. The Saturdays later changed to yellow tabards and they toured London's Westfield Shopping Mall with buckets and asked customers to part with their cash. The Saturdays have supported Marie Curie, which provides nurses to help care for people with terminal cancer. King and Wiseman appeared on 24 March 2012 episode of The Million Pound Drop to raise money for Marie Curie, leaving with a £5000 consolation prize after missing the 8th and final question. The band also have done a charity gig for Sport Relief. The band went on to become supporters of Elton John's charity, Elton John AIDS Foundation. They also went on to do a charity gig with other artists for Help for Heroes to raise money for injured British soldiers.

== Artistry ==
=== Musical style ===
The Saturdays music is pop but throughout the group's time, they experimented with R&B, dance-pop and synth-pop. To create the music the group have closely worked with Ina Wroldsen, Quiz & Larossi, Louis Biancaniello, Steve Mac throughout their career. Their first album was described as "sassy, modern, chart-ready pop is more straightforward than most Girls Aloud singles and younger than the music Sugababes are now recording." Petridis of Allmusic described Wordshaker "combining aggressive basslines and vocals that are a pinch of prowess" and "praised the catchiness [that the songs] can't be denied". And said "If anything, the girls are showing even more confidence this time around" and said that the album was a "fresh-sounding". Later, when the band released their first Extended play, Headlines! critics said "offers a tantalising glimpse of what to expect from the group's next album proper". Others said that the band had "a feisty edge", and concluded by calling the album "short but sweet".

=== Influences ===
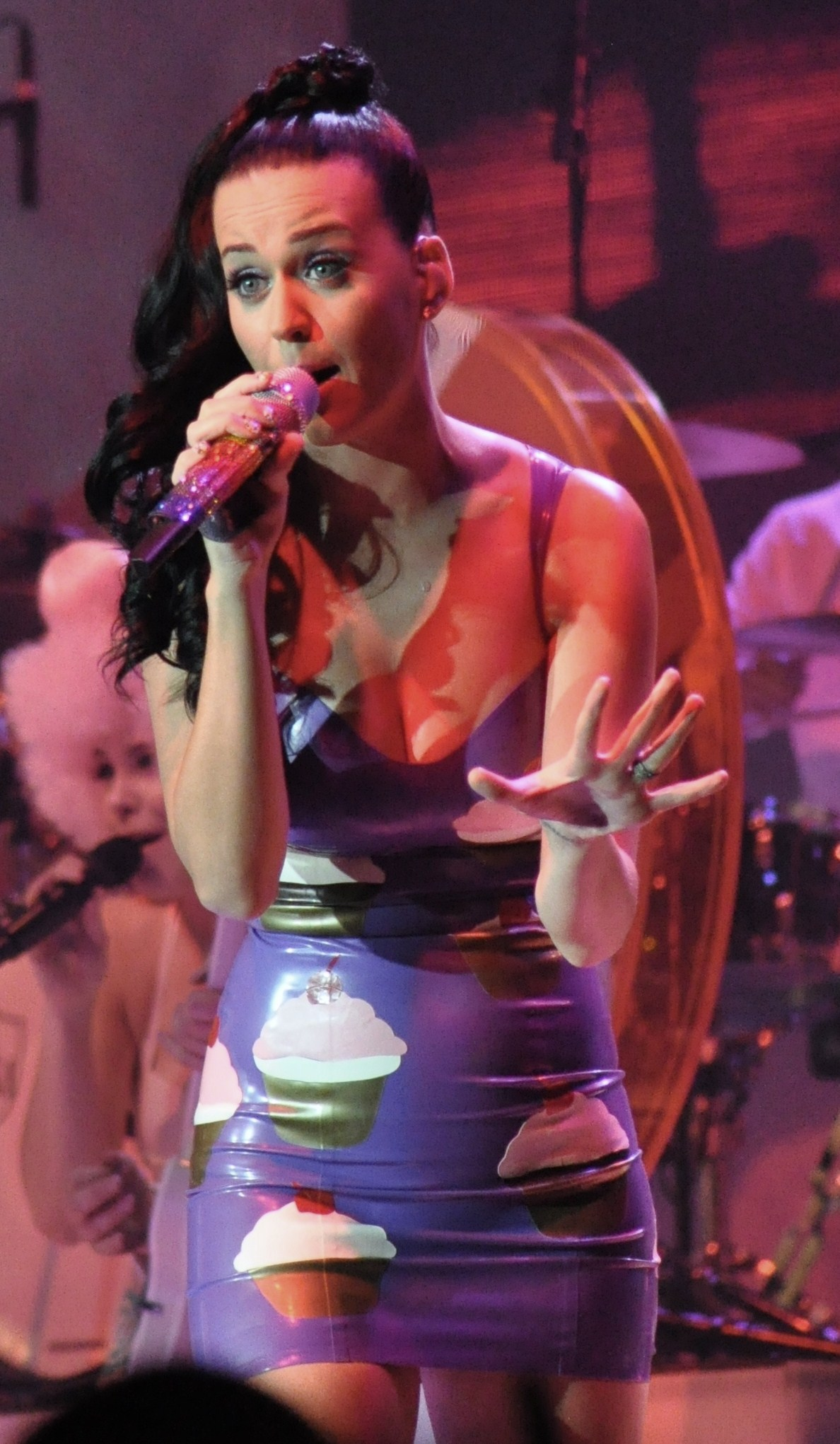
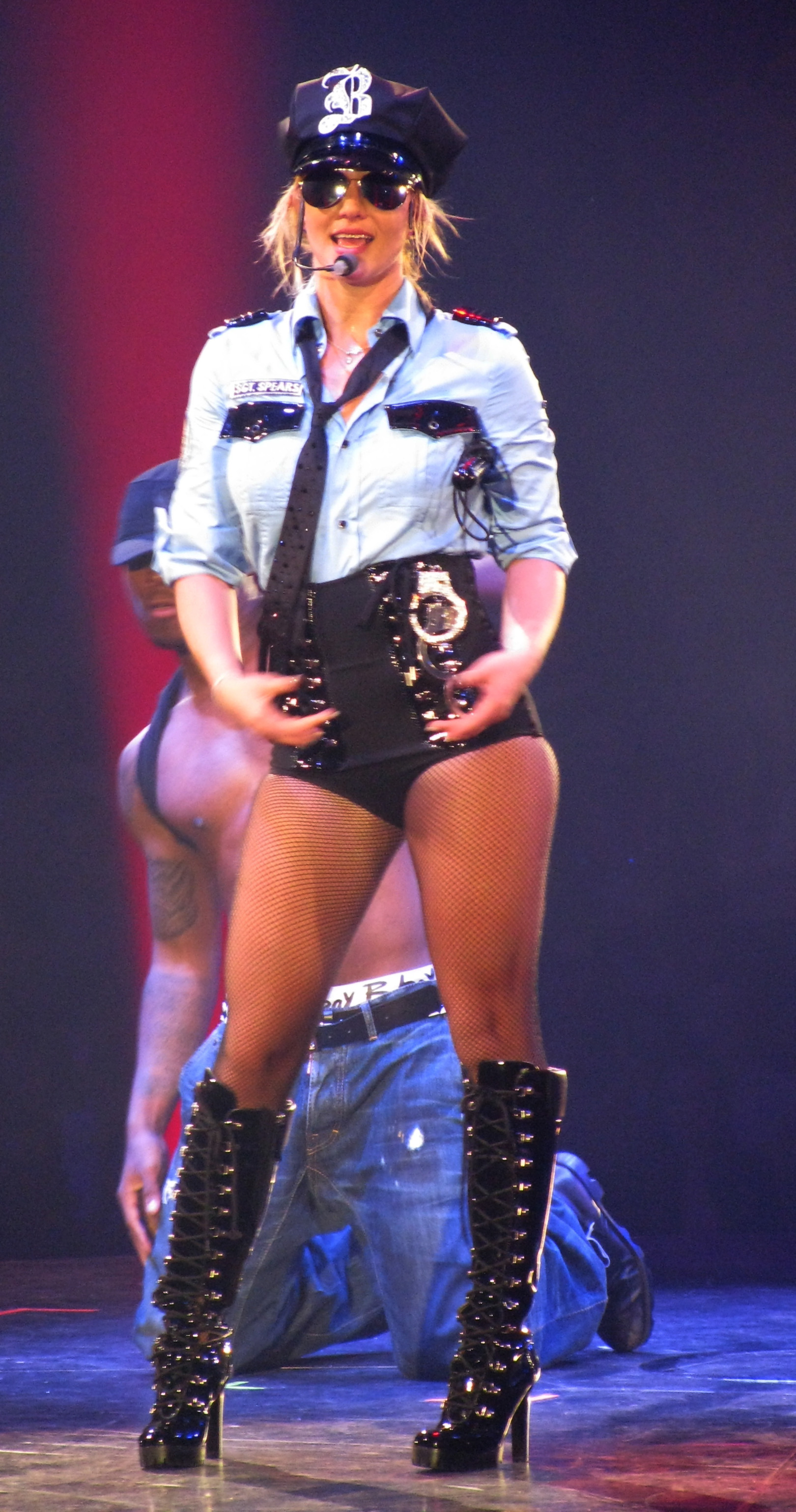
Katy Perry (left) and Britney Spears (right) are two of the artists that the Saturdays are influenced by.

The Saturdays' debut album, Chasing Lights takes influence from a number of genres such as, synthpop, power pop, and new wave. The album also takes a big electropop and dance-pop influence. Upon the release of the album, it was compared to Girls Aloud, Sugababes and Spice Girls. The band's debut single, "If This Is Love," features elements of synthpop and new wave genres. Many critics pointed out that they believe that the band's music would appeal more to the gay community.

Upon the release of the second album, Wordshaker the band released a pop rock track, "Forever Is Over". The album was also said to be a laid-back electro poppy offering that recalls the more subdued moments from their debut album." Talking about the album and the single "Ego"; We were searching for sounds and found the basic hook sound that's in the verse and carries all the way through. I started playing along to it and then Ina started singing along, and the song was written over that. No drums were ever put down." Headlines! was released in 2010, which was the band's first Extended play on the EP, the band have made use of auto-tuning on their vocals, most notable on "Missing You" and "Higher" They said about the music on Headlines! "We finished [Wordshaker] and we'd come across some songs that we were really excited about. The songs that we had found were so current, and we'd written a couple of songs ourselves, [so] we wanted to just get everything out now". The synth-laden "Higher" has become an instant fan fave following recent live performances and, with its infectious chorus and super-sassy lyrics.

With third album On Your Radar, the group said they were beginning to take risks in their music genre. They said; "I think every artist needs to, sort of, reinvent themselves and we don't want any track to sound like it could have been on our previous albums. It's going to be a step up from the last album but we'll keep it The Saturdays-esque." The band described the song's lyrics as "playful" with a "drop-out chorus" and the song is often labelled "it's a very cool" by the band. They described their album as "current", "fun", "naughty" and "girly". "Notorious" was described by critics "big" and that it was "quite amazing". Their new music was also compared to Rihanna, the Black Eyed Peas and Kelis' music. The Saturdays also teamed up with MNEK and Space Cowboy to help them to record "club bangers". "All Fired Up" is an electro house and dance-pop track. Britney Spears, Rihanna, John Mayer, Katy Perry, Beyoncé and Kelly Rowland are all influences on the group.

== Discography ==
=== Studio albums ===
- Chasing Lights (2008)
- Wordshaker (2009)
- On Your Radar (2011)
- Living for the Weekend (2013)

=== EPs ===
- Headlines! (2010)
- Chasing the Saturdays (2013)

== Concert tours ==
Headlining

- The Work Tour (2009)
- Headlines Tour (2011)
- All Fired Up! (2011)
- Greatest Hits Live! (2014)

Supporting

- Tangled Up Tour – Girls Aloud (2008)

Guest act

- The Burning Up Tour – Jonas Brothers (2008)
- Take That Presents: The Circus Live – Take That (2009)
- The Hits Tour – Will Young (2010)
- Brother Tour – Boyzone (2011)

== See also ==
- List of songs recorded by the Saturdays
- List of artists who reached number one on the UK Singles Chart
