= The Saturdays: Our Story =

2010 autobiography by The Saturdays

- Front Cover
- Author: The Saturdays
- Language: English
- Genre: Autobiography
- Publisher: Bantam Press; Transworld
- Publication date: 25 October 2010
- Publication place: United Kingdom
- Media type: Print (Hardcover)
- Pages: 250
- ISBN: 978-0-593-06122-0

The Saturdays: Our Story is the autobiography of English-Irish pop group The Saturdays, which was published in October 2010. The book was written with a ghostwriter and published by the Transworld imprint Bantam Press.

The autobiography was announced through The Saturdays official website in March 2010. The 250-page book also includes an insight into each of the girls' personal lives, their success with The Saturdays.
