= Work (The Saturdays song) =

2009 single by The Saturdays

Single by The Saturdays

from the album Chasing Lights
- B-side: "Unofficial"
- Released: 29 June 2009
- Genre: Dance-pop
- Length: 3:13
- Label: Fascination; Polydor
- Songwriters: Ina Wroldsen; Harry Sommerdahl; Kalle Engström
- Producers: Harry Sommerdahl; Kalle Engström

The Saturdays singles chronology
"Just Can't Get Enough" (2009)	"Work" (2009)	"Forever Is Over" (2009)

Music video
- "Work" on YouTube

"Work" is a song by British-Irish girl group The Saturdays from their debut studio album, Chasing Lights (2008). The song was written by Ina Wroldsen, Harry Sommerdahl and Kalle Engström. It was released on 29 June 2009 as the album's fifth and final single.

An accompanying music video was filmed on 16 May 2009 at Shepperton Studios. The video features a different beat to the single. The music video took concept of the band's debut tour The Work Tour. The music video would become the group's most viewed video at the time.

Commercially, "Work" failed to gain the success of the band's four previous singles. It charted at number 22 on the UK Singles Chart, number 21 on the Irish Singles Chart and 68 on the European Hot 100 Singles. The song became the band's lowest-charting single in the UK at the time (until "What Are You Waiting For?" peaked at number 38 in August 2014), and their first to miss the top 10 (and the top 20). The single was remixed by audio and music technician Phil Tan for its release.

== Background ==
"Work" was originally scheduled to be released as the third single from Chasing Lights, but the song "Issues" was released instead. Then it was rescheduled to be the fourth single, but was pushed back once again as they were given opportunity to record the 2009 Comic Relief single, a cover of Depeche Mode's "Just Can't Get Enough". Its CD single release coincided with the group's first series of headline gigs, The Work Tour, in June 2009.

Mollie King opens the song and sings the first verse, the first bridge and a backing vocal during the second bridge. Una Healy sings backing vocals during the first bridge and adlibs in the final chorus. Vanessa White sings the second verse, leads the chorus, adlibs on the final chorus and closes the song. Frankie Sandford sings the second bridge and small adlib between the final chorus and the end of the song. Rochelle Wiseman sings the third bridge and does adlibs in the final chorus.

== Critical reception ==
"Work" received generally positive reviews from pop music critics. Digital Spy Digital Spy said of the video: "Adopting the classic girlband-in-a-warehouse theme, the ladies strut their stuff down a makeshift catwalk, tease the camera seductively and even attempt a few risqué dance moves. This video won't set the world alight with its dazzling originality, but it nicely complements a real thumper of a song." Jon O'Brien of Allmusic described the track as "muscular dance-pop" and compared it to the music of Rihanna. BBC Music wrote that "tracks like 'Work'...can be skipped in an instant and have 'filler' written all over."

== Chart performance ==
"Work" debuted at number forty-eight on the UK Singles Chart on 13 June 2009 solely on digital downloads and it went on to peak at number twenty-two, making it their lowest-charting single at the time, as well as their first to miss the top ten and the top twenty altogether. It also charted at number 21 on the Irish Singles Chart and 68 on the European Hot 100 Singles. The release of "Work" coincided with the death of Michael Jackson, causing a lower than expected peak position as songs from his back catalogue re-entered the charts. It is also their only single to reach a higher position in Ireland than in the United Kingdom.

== Music video ==
=== Background ===
Before the release of "Work", the music video recorded and was directed by JT, on 16 May 2009. The video was set at Shepperton Studios in Spelthorne, Surrey. The music video has a different tune to the single version, the video version was a remix of the song, which has a heavier instrumentation and a thicker bassline, produced by music engineer, Phil Tan. Throughout the whole video, the band are seen walking the catwalk in black outfits, apart from Vanessa. Within the warehouse the group dances and walks provocatively on a catwalk. Each group member is dressed in a black outfit, except White, who is dressed in a pink catsuit. In the latter part of the video, they are accompanied by male dancers, who are also dressed in black outfits. The video premièred on MSN Video on 27 May 2009. On 25 June 2009, Matt Edmondson presented The Saturdays at Work, a FIVER behind-the-scenes documentary following the making of the video. Some music channels have also been showing the 'Cahill Radio Edit' remix of the song. The video for this version of the song is exactly the same but features streaks of colour which have been digitally super-imposed upon the original imagery.

=== Synopsis ===
The video opens with a little girl walking around an abandoned warehouse, where there are posters of Chasing Lights. As the music starts, King appears to start the song off, walking down the catwalk, then the rest of the girls are behind her, then the band spent out. The little girl hears the sound of the girls singing and dancing, and she walks up the stairs to see what the noise is, and spots the band singing and dancing.

== Track listings ==
- CD single

(Released 29 June 2009)

1. "Work" (Radio Mix) – 3:14
2. "Unofficial" – 3:55
- Digital single

(Released 28 June 2009)

1. "Work" (Radio Mix) – 3:14
2. "Work" (Cahill Radio Edit) – 3:08

iTunes digital single

(Released 28 June 2009)

1. "Work" (Radio Mix) – 3:14
2. "Work" (Cahill Club Mix) – 5:54

Revamped Version

1. "Work" (Phil Tan Radio Mix) - 3:14
2. "Unofficial" - 3:52
3. "Work" (Cahill Radio Edit) - 3:06
4. "Work" (Cahill Full Club Mix) - 5:52
5. "Beggin'" (Live MTV Nokia Session) - 3:04
6. "Chasing Lights" (Live MTV Nokia Session) - 3:57

== Charts ==
Chart (2009)	Peak position
European Hot 100 Singles (Billboard)	68
Ireland (IRMA)	21
Scotland Singles (OCC)	2
UK Singles (OCC)	22

=== Year-end charts ===
Chart (2009)	Peak position
UK Singles Chart	183
