= Chasing Lights =

Studio album by the Saturdays
- Released: 27 October 2008
- Recorded: May–June 2008
- Genres: Pop; dance-pop; electropop; R&B
- Length: 42:06
- Label: Fascination
- Producers: Cutfather; Chris Braide; David Eriksen; Thomas Eriksen; Quiz & Larossi; Ina Wroldsen

The Saturdays chronology
Chasing Lights (2008)	Wordshaker (2009)

Singles from Chasing Lights
- 1. "If This Is Love" Released: 28 July 2008; 2. "Up" Released: 13 October 2008; 3. "Issues" Released: 5 January 2009; 4. "Just Can't Get Enough" Released: 2 March 2009; 5. "Work" Released: 29 June 2009

Chasing Lights is the debut studio album by British-Irish girl group the Saturdays. It was released in the United Kingdom through Fascination Records on 27 October 2008. The album was re-issued on 16 March 2009 to include their cover of Depeche Mode's 1981 song "Just Can't Get Enough".

== Production ==
The Saturdays started production of their debut album in May 2008. They were offered the chance to record songs that were rejected by Girls Aloud, with whom they shared a record label. Their music is often compared to that of Girls Aloud and Sugababes. Band member Mollie King told the Daily Star, "We all thought it was a bit of a cheek. Why would we want their rejects? ... It's bad enough with all the comparisons being made". The last track of Chasing Lights, "Why Me, Why Now", was originally a demo that was written and recorded by Alex Cartañá but was later picked up by The Saturdays. The members of The Saturdays have no writing credits on the record but they do have writing credits on their subsequent albums.

== Singles ==
- "If This Is Love", which was released digitally on 27 July 2008, is the album's lead single. It was released commercially in the UK on 28 July for digital and physical distribution, peaked at number eight on the UK Singles Chart and became their first top-ten hit.
- "Up", which was released digitally on 12 October 2008, is the album's second single. It was released commercially in the UK on 13 October for digital and physical distribution. The song peaked at number five on the UK Singles Chart, becoming their second consecutive top-ten hit, and debuted at number eleven on the Irish Singles Chart. "Up" is the group's debut single in Brazil. "Up" is also used as dubbed over theme song for the 19th annual edition of WWE pay-per-view SummerSlam in 2006, replacing both original theme songs "Cobrastyle" by Teddybears featuring Mad Cobra and "The Enemy" by Godsmack - which was used from SummerSlam: The Complete Anthology Vol. 4 Disc 19 DVD on WWE Home Video released on 5 August 2008 and not to feature dubbing from the original version on WWE Network.
- "Issues", released officially on 5 January 2009, is the album's third single. It was released commercially in the UK on 5 January after spending a few weeks in the top forty. The song hit number six on the UK Singles Chart and became their third consecutive top ten hit. The following week it climbed to number four.
- "Just Can't Get Enough", a non-album single, was released on 2 March 2009. The song entered the UK Singles Chart at number two on 8 March 2009, second to Flo Rida's "Right Round". On the Irish Singles Chart, the song debuted at number seventeen. The following week, it climbed to number nine and peaked at number six. It became their first top-ten and highest-charting single to date in Ireland.
- "Work" was announced in January 2009 as the fifth single to be released from the album. It was a fan-favourite since the release of the album, and it was released in the UK on 29 June 2009 and peaked on the UK Singles Chart at number twenty-two. This remained their lowest charting single until "What Are You Waiting For" charted at number thirty-eight in 2014.

== Critical reception ==
Professional ratings
Review scores
Source	Rating
AllMusic	4/5 stars
Digital Spy	4/5 stars
entertainment.ie	2.5/5 stars
The Guardian	3/5 stars
musicOMH	3/5 stars
OK!	3/5 stars
The Times	4/5 stars
Virgin Media	2/5 stars

Chasing Lights received a positive reception from music critics. Nick Levine from Digital Spy called it a "consistently enjoyable debut album. He found that "their sassy, modern, chart-ready pop is more straightforward than most Girls Aloud singles and younger than the music Sugababes are now recording. The world, or at least the top ten, should be their oyster." Elle J. Small from BBC Music called Chasing Lights a "brazen pop album, brimming with catchy hooks" [that] "has plenty more chart potential." Caroline Sullivan, writing for The Guardian, called the album a "reasonably promising debut," describing it as "high-quality pop." She felt that "despite too much shrill filler, such as the title track (and the more generic the song, the more they ladle on the gritted-teeth sincerity), there are some delicious moments."

AllMusic editor Jon O'Brien found that the album "isn't exactly a radical departure from their counterparts, but it has an infectious quality [...] If they're lucky to make it to album number two, the Saturdays will have to try and develop a sound of their own. But brimming with hooks and sparkling melodies, Chasing Lights is undoubtedly a consistent pop album that should, at the very least, keep their rivals on their toes." Virgin Media editor Johnny Dee described the album as "slick and shiny but safe." Peter Hayward from musicOMH called Chasing Light a "slick album of mostly passable and at times really rather good pop [that] is no poor showing, but it does little to pick The Saturdays out as anything much more than Girls Aloud Junior." The album was number four on Popjustice's 2008 year-end chart of the best albums.

== Commercial performance ==
In the UK, Chasing Lights debuted at number eleven while in Ireland it debuted at number forty-nine. By April 2009, the album reached number thirty-four in Ireland. The album climbed from number fourteen to number nine in the UK on 25 January 2009. The album was certified Platinum in the UK on 6 November 2009.

== Track listing ==
Chasing Lights track listing
No.	Title	Writer(s)	Producer(s)	Length
1.	"If This Is Love"	Alison Moyet; Ina Wroldsen; Joe Belmaati; John Reid; Mich Hansen; Mikkel Sigvardt; Vince Clarke	Cutfather; Joe	3:23
2.	"Up"	Andreas Romdhane; Wroldsen; Josef Larossi	Quiz & Larossi	4:05
3.	"Keep Her"	David Eriksen; Wroldsen; Thomas Eriksen	D. Eriksen; T. Eriksen	3:01
4.	"Issues"	Evan Rogers; Carl Sturken	Rogers; Sturken	3:32
5.	"Lies"	D. Eriksen; Wroldsen; T. Eriksen	D. Eriksen; T. Eriksen	3:51
6.	"Work"	Harry Sommerdahl; Wroldsen; Kalle Engstrom	Sommerdahl; Engstrom	3:11
7.	"Chasing Lights"	Chris Braide; Wroldsen	Braide	4:01
8.	"Set Me Off"	D. Eriksen; Wroldsen; T. Eriksen	D. Eriksen; T. Eriksen	3:04
9.	"Fall"	Andre Lindal; Wroldsen; J.C. Isaksen	D. Eriksen; T. Eriksen	3:22
10.	"Vulnerable"	Alex James; Dean Gillard; Matt Ward; Nina Woodford	Gillard; Ward	4:04
11.	"Why Me, Why Now"	Hannah Robinson; Alex Cartana; Paul Statham	Statham	3:46
12.	"Up" (Wideboys Remix Edit) (UK bonus track)	Romdhane; Wroldsen; Larossi	Quiz & Larossi; The Wideboys	3:01
Total length:				42:06

2009 reissue
No.	Title	Writer(s)	Producer(s)	Length
12.	"Just Can't Get Enough" (Radio mix)	Clarke	D. Eriksen	3:05
13.	"Up" (Wideboys Remix edit)	Romdhane; Wroldsen; Larossi	Quiz & Larossi; The Wideboys	3:01

== Charts and certifications ==
=== Weekly charts ===
Weekly chart performance for What's Your Pleasure?
Chart (2008–2009)	Peak position
European Top 100 Albums (Billboard)	46
Scottish Albums (Official Charts)	12
Irish Albums (IRMA)	34
UK Albums (Official Charts)	9

=== Year-end charts ===
2008 year-end chart performance for What's Your Pleasure?
Chart (2008)	Position
UK Albums (OCC)	198

2009 year-end chart performance for What's Your Pleasure?
Chart (2009)	Position
UK Albums (OCC)	57

== Certifications ==
Certifications for Chasing Lights
Region	Certification	Certified units/sales
United Kingdom (BPI)	Platinum	386,721
^{‡} Sales+streaming figures based on certification alone.
