= If This Is Love =

Single by The Saturdays

from the album Chasing Lights
- B-side: "What Am I Gonna Do?"
- Released: 27 July 2008
- Genre: Dance-pop; electropop; synth-pop
- Length: 3:24
- Label: Fascination, Polydor
- Songwriters: Joe Belmaati, Michaela Breen, Vince Clarke, Mich Hansen, Alison Moyet, John Reid, Remee, Ina Wroldsen
- Producer: Joe Belmaati, Cutfather

The Saturdays singles chronology
"If This Is Love" (2008)	"Up" (2008)

Music video
- "If This Is Love" on YouTube

"If This Is Love" is the debut single by English-Irish girl group The Saturdays from their debut album, Chasing Lights (2008). It was co-written by Joe Belmaati, Michaela Breen, Vince Clarke, Mich Hansen, Alison Moyet, John Reid, Remee and Ina Wroldsen. The song was produced by Belmaati in collaboration with Cutfather, also known as the duo Cutfather & Joe. The track samples a heavily synthesised backing rhythm from Yazoo's 1982 song "Situation".

"If This Is Love" was first released by Fascination and Polydor Records on 27 July 2008 as the lead single from Chasing Lights. It was accompanied by a B-side entitled "What Am I Gonna Do?", written and produced by Duck Blackwell and Paddy Dalton. The Saturdays collaborated with Ina Wroldsen on a number of songs; eight were chosen for the album. "If This Is Love" was then released as the first single from it. The song has prominent electropop and dance-pop genre characteristics. It contains lyrical influences from love-hate relationships, the definition of love and its complications that can result in situations of stalking.

"If This Is Love" received mainly positive reviews from contemporary music critics. On 3 August 2008, the single debuted and peaked at number eight on the UK Singles Chart with a total of just under 15,000 copies sold in its first week of release. It has since sold a total of 107,000 copies in the United Kingdom to-date. The single also garnered charting success for the group in Europe, where it reached number thirty-three on the European Hot 100 Singles chart.

The music video accompanying "If This Is Love" was directed by Harvey B. Brown and premiered on MSN Video on 16 June 2008. The video features The Saturdays in colourful dresses performing and meeting the paparazzi. "If This Is Love" was performed by The Saturdays as part of their setlist on The Work Tour and as supporting acts on Girls Aloud's Tangled Up Tour and Take That's Take That Present: The Circus Live Tour. The group also performed the single on various television shows, namely: Loose Women, GMTV and on Nickelodeon. Popjustice included the song in its list of the top hundred and four singles of 2008, ranking it at number forty-five. About.com ranked "If This Is Love" in their list of the best dance songs of 2008 at number twenty-eight.

== Background ==
"If This Is Love" was written by Joe Belmaati, Mich Hansen, Vince Clarke, Alison Moyet, John Reid, Remee and Ina Wroldsen for the group's debut album Chasing Lights. The track samples Yazoo's 1982 single "Situation" (written by Vince Clarke and Alison Moyet) as its heavily synthesised backing rhythm; the difference between the rhythm of "If This Is Love" is that it is in A♭-tune, in comparison to the original's C♭-tune. The song was produced by Danish producers Joe Belmaati and Cutfather, also known as the duo Cutfather & Joe. The song features additional backing vocals from Danish singer Nabiha. Belmaati has also been credited for the keyboard and percussion instrumentation in the song, as well as for doing its engineering, mixing and programming. The song was mastered by Dick Beetham, and Graham Archer assisted in its engineering and recording.

"If This Is Love" is an upbeat dance-pop, electropop and synthpop song. Its style has also been described by music critics as "obligatory fluffy summery pop", "pure uplifting pop", "an 80's throwback" and "an electro-soul number". The song has a feisty and danceable feel to it that would appeal as anthemic to the gay community. It is 3 minutes and 23 seconds in length. Written in the key of A♭ minor, the beat is set in common time and moves at a mid-tempo 117 beats per minute. The song was constructed around a keyboard and percussion arrangement that follows an A♯m–E♯m-F chord progression which forms the song's hook.

The vocals in the track are auto-tuned. Mollie King sings the response in the first and second verses, a backing vocal during the song's middle 8, and she opens and closes the song with a "Yeah!". Una Healy sings the call in the first verse as well as the bridge to the first and second choruses with Rochelle Wiseman, and some vocals after every chorus. Wiseman sings the bridges to the first and second choruses with Healy, as well as the song's middle 8. Frankie Sandford sings the solo parts in every chorus. Vanessa White sings the call in the second verse as well as backing vocals after the middle 8 and during the final chorus.

The song lyrics refer to love-hate relationships, the definition of love and its complications that can lead to situations of stalking. Healy elaborates:

It's about a love/hate relationship really. These two people are falling in love but they're scared of getting hurt. The verses are all about one of them stalking the other one, hanging out outside the other's window.

— Una Healy, Digital Spy

Healy also elaborated on how excited the group were about releasing "If This Is Love":

[...] Getting our first single out there is going to be amazing. We've been working hard for a long time now and we want to show everyone what we're all about and what we can do. We're ready for it!

== Critical reception ==
"If This Is Love" received mainly positive reviews from contemporary music critics. It garnered comparisons with the music produced by the likes of Girls Aloud, Depeche Mode, Sugababes, Robyn and Rachel Stevens, and was praised for its Yazoo sample and catchy chorus.

Catrin Pascoe of the Western Mail said that "If This Is Love" was her least favourite song on Chasing Lights. Nick Levine of Digital Spy reviewed the song: "This debut single is nothing that Rachel Stevens couldn't have given us three or four years ago: a midtempo electropop tune with a memorable chorus and a crafty Yazoo sample slipped in for bonus street cred. It's a solid, promising effort, but not really in the same league as the best debuts by British girl groups: 'Sound of the Underground', 'Overload', 'Wannabe' [...]". Evening Standard said: "'If This Is Love' is a slick electro-soul number. [...] The vocals are a little shrill in places, but the overall feel is upbeat and feisty."

Mike Barnes of musicOMH positively reviewed the single: "The track itself is the obligatory fluffy summery pop we can't seem to manage without at this time of the year, replete with auto-tuned vocals that sound as though they've simply been parachuted in over a dance track to make it radio friendly. The chorus is pleasing enough, but what really lifts this is the pervasive Yazoo sample." Elle J. Small of the BBC highlighted the song's "Synth-heavy sound" and further described its sound as "An '80s throwback". Johnny Dee of Virgin Media likened "If This Is Love" to Sugababes' 2002 song "Freak Like Me", saying: "The opening bars of 'If This Is Love' sample 80s legends Yazoo, much as Sugababes did with 'Freak' and Gary Numan." Popjustice boasted that the song is: "An object lesson in how to write a pop song with a chorus so unexpectedly brilliant that it makes you think your head is going to explode." Phillip Thomas from The London Paper described the track as "disco-candy". American blogger, Perez Hilton called the song a "gay anthem". PopSugar said the track is "danceable". DJ Ron Slomowicz from About.com labelled the single as "pop-perfection" and noted an influence of Spiller's 2000 song "Groovejet (If This Ain't Love)" in the intonation of the chorus. Mickey McMonagle of the Sunday Mail gave the single a five-star rating, calling it "catchy", a "brash pop song" and that "added impact comes from Yazoo's sample". Peter Hayward of musicOMH described the song as follows: "'If This Is Love' is a jolly blend of techno, disco and dance similar to the likes of Girls Aloud and Robyn. The track is uncomplicated and upbeat, and just begging for dance routines to be formulated in teenagers' bedrooms across the nation." Gary Ryan from City Life said that the song surpassed the recent efforts of The Saturdays' girl group contemporaries; Sugababes and Pussycat Dolls.

Fraser McAlpine of the BBC gave the single a four out of five star rating, saying:

Essentially there are two very good elements in play here: the Yazoo sample, and the chorus. Conveniently these two do not overlap, but one or the other is in play at pretty much any time. However, the sample is probably relied upon too heavily and once you realise that, the verses sound rather flimsy. The chorus, however, bears repeated listens. It's infectious and melodically strong, and mature [...] this is an impressive debut - The Saturdays have gone with the trick of releasing a song that doesn't sound like a first single, but sounds like they have in fact been doing this sort of thing for years and aren't even considering that this might not be a hit.

== Chart performance ==
"If This Is Love" debuted and peaked at number eight on the UK Singles Chart on 3 August 2008. It sold 14,990 copies in its first week of release. The single was also the second highest new entry of the week behind Katy Perry's "I Kissed a Girl" which debuted at number four. The following week the single dropped out the top ten after one week, falling five places to number 13 on 10 August. In its third week on the chart the single dropped six places to number 19 and then a further six places to number 25 in fourth week on the chart. "If This Is Love" spent its fifth and final week in the top 40 at number 36 on 31 August before dropping eleven places to number 47 on 7 September. On 14 September it fell fourteen places to number 61 in its seventh week on the chart before dropping out of the top 75. Following the release of Chasing Lights and the popularity of follow-up single "Up", "If This Is Love" re-entered the chart after an absence of six weeks, at number 71 on 26 October 2008. It then climbed five places to number 66 the following week before exiting the chart again on 9 November 2008. Altogether, "If This Is Love" spent a total of nine weeks within the chart and has sold over 110,000 copies in the United Kingdom alone.

The group was pleased with the chart position "If This Is Love" achieved, Mollie King explained in an interview with Digital Spy:

We were thrilled! Nobody really knew The Saturdays at that point and for a new girl group to go straight into the top ten is fantastic.

The single also garnered charting success for the group in Europe, where it reached number 33 on the European Hot 100 Singles chart.

Despite the song's success, the group have since said that "If This Is Love" is the song they like the least out of all their songs.

== Music video ==
A screenshot of some of the scenes from the colourful, celebrity-inspired music video for "If This Is Love".

The music video for "If This Is Love" was directed by Harvey B Brown and premiered on MSN Video on 16 June 2008.

Upon the filming of the music video, Wiseman commented on the experience:

We had so much fun, it was a very long day but we enjoyed every second of it! I had to get up at 5.30 in the morning so I didn't look too pretty, but thankfully we had an amazing 'glam squad' on hand! We all felt like superstars for the day! It's really starting to feel like our hard work is paying off. We all just kept saying 'I can't believe we are finally making a video'.

Sandford elaborated on the styling experience during the video, saying: "We were all excited to see what the stylist had in store for us. It was so fun [...] It's like shopping but better, because all the best stuff has been picked out for you!"

In the original version of the video the group wears vintage inspired cup fitted cinched dresses. The dresses are inspired by the simple, modern satin dresses that are usually seen on the stars on the red carpet. Sandford wears a 'passionate purple' silver ribbon banded strappy dress. Healy has a yellow layered satin dress with flowing detail at the skirt. King wore a berry print waist banded slim fitting satin dress with a pair of little black heels and a little silver diamante Playboy necklace. White and Wiseman had layered Bust Jersey dresses, with a cinched-in waist and flared skirt.

=== Concept ===
The concept of the music video is that The Saturdays are shooting a pop video and, people and video crew are fussing over them. They play the role of famous popstars. There are teenage girl fans outside the shop and performance implying that the band is established and already has fans. The band are appearing in the window of a high street, Top Shop-style store. "Despite looking great the band are accessible and so is their style" describes Popjustice. This aimed to give imagery to the viewer that they can dress like The Saturdays and be part of their group and fanbase. A boy, described as "inoffensively handsome" gives Sandford his number. This imagery is aimed to get the group's fans to think the same might happen to them if they become part of the group or fanbase. The band sign autographs after the photo shoot, this is to show that they are not so famous that they refuse to sign autographs and to create the imagery that the band will be friendly to you if they see you as a fan in public.

The video begins with the group's logo flashing onscreen before moving into the setting of a backstage dressing room which enables passers-by to have a view of the activity within, similar to a display window. The group's members are sitting down singing during the first verse and bridge as they are getting their hair and make-up done whilst looking in the mirror. Viewers also get introduced to the tradition of each member's signature colour in dress code which is apparent in most of the music videos the band has released likewise in this video - each girl is wearing a different coloured dress to the other girls. The colours being: red, blue, green, yellow and pink.

The setting then moves in what seems to be an evening scene where the girls are getting escorted by the music video's production crew to performing live onstage in front of a cheering audience. Whilst on stage, each girl's stiletto heel can also be seen to be a different colour to other girls' and at the same time not matching the colour of their dress. The girls are prominently seen singing seated on colourful chairs during this scene. The background to the stage is in a washed out colour that contrasts with the group's outfits. Nearing the end of this scene, a man in the crowd can be seen handing out his phone number on a piece of paper to one of the group members, Sandford, who in the end ignores the offer.

The crowd can be heard cheering ecstatically as the group is escorted by the production crew off the stage before moving onto the final setting. This setting comprises the girls walking side by side, surrounded by a large number of fans and the paparazzi cheering for them. The girls sign autographs for their fans amongst the flashing lights of the paparazzi cameras. The music video then ends with the lights on the stage where they were performing - flashing out. The music video uses the single's album version and not the shorter radio edit.

=== Reception ===
King blogged about her reaction to when she first saw the video:

[...] suddenly we got a call from our management telling us to come into the office to watch our video for 'If This Is Love' for the first time ever! Ahhh we were so nervous and so excited! We all shot up there as fast as we could and all I can say is... 'Oh my God, it is amazing!' We were so happy, Ness (Vanessa White) and I even started crying! We all ran out of the office after and had a group hug (yes, my idea, you know I like to cheese things up, haha). I wanted to run out onto the street and shout 'Hey everyone our music video rocks!'

PopSugar positively reviewed the video, saying they loved the group's logo and walk in unison. Popjustice positively reviewed the music video, saying: "As well as being a nice video featuring some pretty ladies in colourful frocks, it's a brilliant piece of suggestive film making which clearly signposts several important factors for the viewer."

== Live performances ==
To coincide with the release of "If This Is Love" the group begun touring the United Kingdom with girl group Girls Aloud on 3 May 2008 as a supporting act for their Tangled Up Tour.

Prior to the tour, White mentioned: "We can't wait to get out and sing it in front of loads of people, it's going to be brilliant".

On 22 June 2008, the Saturdays performed on live television for the first time, on Channel 4 music television show The Nokia Green Room. The group then performed "If This Is Love" on GMTV's The Richard Arnold Show on 18 July 2008. 24 July 2008 saw the group perform "If This Is Love" on British lunchtime television programme Loose Women as part of the single's pre-release promotion. The band then performed the single on a children's television channel, Nickelodeon on 30 July 2008. In October 2008, the single was performed by the girls on BBC television series, Sound.

On 3 January 2009, the group performed the song along with "Up" and "Issues" at G-A-Y. The girls wore sequined miniskirts and big hair during the performance.

"If This Is Love" featured as the opening performance in the group's first solo tour, The Work Tour. They performed it at twenty-six different venues in the United Kingdom and The Philippines between June and August 2009. During their performance, the group wears matching black raincoats. Catrin Pascoe of the Western Mail positively reviewed a performance of the song on the tour, mentioning: "[...] they got me up on my feet dancing and singing along. [...] for their biggest performance yet, the five girls did themselves proud, leaving me wishing they needed a sixth member." At another date of the tour, the performance of the song received a negative review from Rick Pearson of the Evening Standard: "'If This Is Love' was a nervy set-opener with the band looking and sounding unsure and exposed."

== Formats and track listings ==
CD single

(Released: 28 July 2008)

1. "If This Is Love" (Radio Edit) — 2:59
2. "What Am I Gonna Do?" — 3:18

Digital single
(Released: 27 July 2008)

1. "If This Is Love" — 3:24
2. "What Am I Gonna Do?" — 3:18

iTunes single
(Released: 27 July 2008)

1. "If This Is Love" — 3:24
2. "If This Is Love" (Moto Blanco Club Mix) — 7:45

Revamped version

1. "If This Is Love" — 3:24
2. "What Am I Gonna Do" — 3:15
3. "If This Is Love" (Moto Blanco Radio Edit) — 3:35
4. "If This Is Love" (Moto Blanco Club Mix) — 7:45

== Official versions ==
- "If This Is Love" (Radio Edit) — 2:59
- "If This Is Love" (Album Version) — 3:23
- "If This Is Love" (Moto Blanco Radio Edit) — 3:38
- "If This Is Love" (Coin Operated Boy Remix) — 5:18
- "If This Is Love" (Moto Blanco Dub) — 7:42
- "If This Is Love" (Moto Blanco Club Remix) — 7:45

== Credits and personnel ==
- Songwriting – Joe Belmaati, Vince Clarke, Alison Moyet, John Reid, Remee, Ina Wroldsen, Michaela Breen
- Production – Joe Belmaati, Cutfather
- Instruments and programming – Joe Belmaati
- Recording – Graham Archer
- Engineering – Joe Belmaati, Graham Archer
- Main vocals – Una Healy, Mollie King, Frankie Sandford, Vanessa White, Rochelle Wiseman
- Background vocals – Mollie King, Nabiha, Vanessa White, Michaela Breen
- Mixing – Joe Belmaati
- Mastering – Dick Beetham

== Charts ==
Chart (2008)	Peak position
European Hot 100 Singles (Billboard)	33
Scottish Singles Sales (Official Charts)	3
UK Singles (Official Charts)	8

== Release history ==
Country	Date	Format	Label
United Kingdom; Ireland	27 July 2008	Digital download	Fascination Records; Polydor Records
United Kingdom; Ireland	28 July 2008	CD single	Fascination Records; Polydor Records
