= Veet =

Canadian brand of chemical depilatory

- Inception: 1919
- Available: Yes
- Website: https://www.veet.com/

Veet, formerly called Neet and Immac, is a Canadian brand of chemical depilatory products manufactured by the British-Dutch company Reckitt Benckiser. Hair removal cream, lotions, gel, mousse, and wax products are produced under this brand, with differing variants being sold internationally. Previous products produced under the Neet and Immac brands were similar to those produced today.

Veet's hair removal products contain thioglycolic acid and potassium hydroxide. These ingredients react to generate the depilatory chemical potassium thioglycolate, which according to the company, increases hair loss. The effect is to break the disulfide bonds of the keratin molecules in hair. This reduces the tensile strength of the keratin so greatly that the hair can be wiped away.

== Products ==
=== Creams (Tube) ===
- Naturals
- Brightening
- Normal, Dry & Sensitive
- Superm Essence
- Nikhaar

=== Lotions (Jar) ===
- Normal
- Dry
- Sensitive
- Naturals (Normal-Dry & Sensitive)
- Nikhaar

=== Wax Strips ===
- Normal Skin
- Dry Skin
- Sensitive Skin

==== Face Wax Strips ====
- Normal
- Sensitive

== Product history ==
Previously called "Neet," the hair removal product was originally manufactured by the Hannibal Pharmaceutical Company. In 1918, the company registered "Neet" as a trademark in Canada. Shortly thereafter, in 1921, the company filed for a trademark in the United States, with the subsequent trademark being granted in 1922. In 1958; however, the trademark for Neet was transferred to the American Home Products Corporation. Today, Reckitt Benckiser Group PLC, holds the trademark, having acquired it in 1990 (then called Reckitt & Colman (Overseas) Limited).

The Veet name was established in 1922 in the UK, vite meaning "quickly" in the French language. The name was used in some European countries but was not used universally. For example, while the product was sold as Veet in France, the product was sold in Canada and the United States as Neet until 2002, when the Veet name was first used commercially in those countries.

As for 2021, Veet has developed products for different types of skin such as normal, dry and sensitive. Additionally, they have expanded from wax strips to creams and selling a device called "Sensitive Precision" to style face, bikini and underarm.

== Advertising ==
Veet was advertised in the 1920s (then known as Neet) as a product that was "faster than shaving", was called "the ready to use hair removing cream," and was initially sold for about fifty cents in the United States.

More recent advertising campaigns have used university students as spokespersons for their products or contained political commentary, such as the "No More Bush" ads after the 2008 United States Presidential Election.

Some advertising from Veet has been controversial. A test website for the product in France offended some online users by claiming that the product was "good for the pussy." A representative of Veet addressed the situation stating, "We wanted to create an ad campaign that was a bit humorous and offbeat...we didn't want to shock, but we're not the experts on that." The manager reported there were several complaints about the website, and it was summarily taken down so as not to "tarnish the brand's image."

In April 2014, Veet released a number of controversial commercials. These were poorly received across social media, drawing wide criticism for their unkind depiction of unshaven women as being masculine.
