= Up (The Saturdays song) =

2008 single by the Saturdays

Single by the Saturdays

from the album Chasing Lights
- B-side: "Crashing Down"
- Released: 12 October 2008
- Genre: Dance-pop; electropop; synth-pop
- Length: 3:26 (radio mix); 4:04 (album version)
- Label: Fascination, Polydor
- Songwriters: Josef Larossi, Andreas Romdhane, Ina Wroldsen
- Producer: Quiz & Larossi

The Saturdays singles chronology
"If This Is Love" (2008)	"Up" (2008)	"Issues" (2009)

Music video
- "Up" on YouTube

"Up" is a song by British-Irish girl group the Saturdays from their debut studio album, Chasing Lights (2008). It was co-written by the track's producers, Josef Larossi and Andreas Romdhane of Quiz & Larossi, in collaboration with Ina Wroldsen. "Up" was first released by Fascination and Polydor Records on 12 October 2008 as the second single from Chasing Lights. It was accompanied by a B-side entitled "Crashing Down"; originally recorded by the Nolans in 1982, and written by Benjamin Findon, Robert Puzey and Mike Myers, and produced by Jewels & Store.

The Saturdays previously collaborated with Ina Wroldsen for their debut single "If This Is Love", as well as on six other tracks chosen for the album. Future singles including Ego, also came from collaboration with Ina Wroldsen and Rhys Barker. The song is upbeat and, has prominent pop and electropop genre characteristics. It contains lyrical influences from feelings of feminism and self-confidence in a personal relationship with your lover.

"Up" received mainly positive reviews from contemporary music critics. On 19 October 2008 it debuted at number five on the UK Singles Chart with sales of 26,593 in its first week of release. It became the group's second consecutive top ten hit in the United Kingdom and was certified Silver by the British Phonographic Industry. It was the Saturdays' best-selling single at that time, with sales of over 311,000 copies in the United Kingdom alone. The single became the group's first chart hit in Ireland where it peaked at number eleven, it also reached number 15 on the European Hot 100 Singles chart.

"Up" was accompanied by a music video that was directed by Harvey B. Brown and released on 2 September 2008. The video features the group performing dance routines in their signature-coloured dress code and jumping from large pillars. The Saturdays performed the song as part of their setlist for their tour, The Work Tour. It was also performed by the group on various television programmes, including: Kids Choice Awards, Sound and Everybody Loves Lil' Chris. Popjustice ranked "Up" as the eighth best single of 2008 in its list of 'The Top 104 Singles of 2008'. The song was also used to back television advertisements and trailers for popular American television series, Ugly Betty and CBBC's The Sarah Jane Adventures.

== Background ==
The first studio version of "Up" premiered on Popjustice on 17 July 2008 in the form of a short clip, after the group previously performed the song, when it was being recorded, live at various gigs in the United Kingdom. The song then officially premiered in full on 31 August 2008 on BBC Radio 1.

"Up" was co-written by Josef Larossi and Andreas Romdhane of Quiz & Larossi, in collaboration with Ina Wroldsen. The song was produced by Swedish musicians Quiz & Larossi, with additional production done by Jeremy Wheatley. Additional programming and keyboards were by Fiasco. Quiz & Larossi also contributed to the track's keyboard, drum instrumentation and programming. The song was mixed by Jeremy Wheatley with the assistance of Richard Edgeler. The vocals performed by the Saturdays were recorded by Ina Wroldsen, engineered by Graham Archer and mastered by Dick Beetham.

"Up" is an upbeat pop and electropop song. Its style has also been described as "electro-tinged" and "robotic disco-pop". The song has a fun and anthemic feel to it. It is 4 minutes and 4 seconds in length. The track also contains prominent siren sound effects which have been likened to the sound of Mis-Teeq's 2003 song "Scandalous". The backing is synthesised on one note throughout the whole song. Written in the key of A minor the beat of the song is set in 6/8 and progresses at an uptempo 126 beats per minute. The chorus follows an Am–F–Dm–E chord progression.

Una Healy sings both the first and second verse. While Vanessa White sings the 2 bridges, middle 8 and leads the chorus. Rochelle Wiseman sings backing vocal in White's second bridge. Healy and Wiseman take lower harmonies in the chorus while Mollie King and Frankie Sandford who don't sing solos in the song, both take higher harmonies.

"Up" contains several travelling-themed lyrical lines such as; "this is the crossing at the main intersection" and "this is the final call for all destinations", which act as a metaphorical way of taking a relationship to the next level. It is descriptively influenced by feelings of feminism and self-confidence of a woman involved in a relationship that is not going anywhere. The lyrics have been interpreted by music critics to not make sense.

== Critical reception ==
"Up" received mainly positive reviews from contemporary music critics. It also received comparisons to music released by Girls Aloud, Mis-Teeq, Rihanna and Liberty X. The single was also described by the majority of music critics as a better song than the group's first single "If This Is Love".

Jamie Harper of musicOMH gave "Up" a mainly negative review: "[...] the verse to 'Up' sounds disturbingly like someone's pressed the 'demo' button on a keyboard. The result makes them sound like Liberty X's [...] younger sister. Elsewhere expect the standard pop formulas such as lyrics that don't really make sense, verse-chorus-verse-chorus song structure, and some actually quite nice vocal melodies."

Nick Levine from Digital Spy positively reviewed the song, saying: "[...] this quivering electropop track sounds like a smash, boasting a memorable chorus, sharp, modern production and the best use of sirens in a pop song since Mis-Teeq's 'Scandalous'. Up is where they go from here indeed." Elle J. Small of the BBC described "Up" as "a massive sing-along song, which should make Girls Aloud very scared indeed". OK! Magazine described the single as an "electro-tinged tune" and an "addictive pop anthem". Caroline Sullivan from The Guardian mentioned that the song was "high-quality pop" and "a delicious moment" on Chasing Lights. Jon O'Brein of Allmusic said that "Up" was a "robotic disco-pop song" with "infectious quality". Johnny Dee from Virgin Media said that "Up" along with "If This Is Love" were the only "truly inspired pop moments" on Chasing Lights and that it "hints at Girls Aloud-style twisted pop slickness". Peter Hayward of musicOMH described "Up" as a "slick, sassy number baring more than a passing resemblance to Rihanna's poppier moments." Gary Ryan from City Life said that the "precision-tooled electropop" song surpassed the recent efforts of the Saturdays' girl group contemporaries; Sugababes and Pussycat Dolls. Lauren Murphy of Entertainment.ie described "Up" as "bleepy, murky deliciousness". Aimee Younge from Orange positively reviewed the single: "The Saturdays are back with a second, even better single. With classic '80s bubblegum pop undertones, 'Up' is a smart yet fun, catchy number that could just as easily have been recorded by Girls Aloud." Popjustice described "Up" as "a world class song so brilliant that everything else is blown out of the water", further mentioning: "'Up' which, unlike 'If This Is Love', is much more than just a brilliant chorus with some other bits chucked in. What's also brilliant about the track is that although it's very excellent and very 'now' it doesn't sound like either Girls Aloud or the Sugababes, meaning that it's a song which wouldn't be released if The Saturdays didn't exist. Which in turn means the band are carving out their own little niche [...]".

Fraser McAlpine of the BBC gave "Up" a four out of five star rating, saying:

It's great. There's no question. It sounds like it is being sung by a team of close-harmony Rihannas [...] It's got a swing to it, and someone seems to be playing the same synth note over and over again, probably using their face, in a manner which suggests some obsessive-compulsive desire to see if it will fit all the way through, if it is played very often, and it more or less does. These are all reasons to cheer whenever the song is played on the radio.

== Chart performance ==
On 19 October 2008 "Up" debuted at number five on the UK Singles Chart with first week sales of 26,593. In turn outpeaking and outselling previous single "If This Is Love" which debuted at number eight with first week sales of 14,990. "Up" became the Saturdays' second consecutive top ten hit in the United Kingdom. It was the third highest new entry in its release week, debuting behind Geraldine's "The Winner's Song" which debuted at number two and Leon Jackson's "Don't Call This Love" which debuted at number three. On 26 October 2008 the single dropped one place to number six with sales of 22,539 for that week. In its third and final week in the top ten it dropped one place to number seven with sales of 22,491 before dropping six places to number thirteen in its fourth week on the chart. On 16 November it then dropped five places to number eighteen before dropping a further four places to number twenty-two in its sixth week on the chart. In its seventh week it fell four places to number twenty-six and on 7 December it dropped three places to number twenty-nine. The song spent its ninth consecutive week in the top 40 on 14 December at number thirty-five before dropping ten places to number forty-five the following week. The single, however, re-entered the top forty a week later at number thirty-five, staying in the top forty for an additional ten weeks before dropping out on 8 March 2009. In total "Up" spent 19 non-consecutive weeks in the top forty and 36 weeks within the top 100 of the UK Singles Chart. It remains the longest chart-sitting single released by the Saturdays and was at one point the group's best selling single to-date, now sitting behind "What About Us", "Higher", and "Ego".

"Up" became the Saturdays' first chart hit in Ireland, it debuted at number fifteen on 16 October 2008. In its second week on the chart it climbed four places to number eleven, where it peaked for one week. On 30 October it dropped two places to number thirteen and in its fourth week on the chart it dropped a further places to number fifteen. "Up" then dropped six places to number twenty-one on 13 November and on its sixth week in the chart it rebounded to climb one place to number twenty. The single dropped four places to number twenty-four on 27 November and then a further seven places to number thirty-one on 11 December. On its ninth week on the chart it fell four places to number thirty-five and the following week it dropped a further four places to number thirty-nine. Altogether it spent a total of twenty-four weeks within the chart's top fifty.

The single also garnered charting success for the group in Europe, where it reached number fifteen on the European Hot 100 Singles chart, becoming the Saturdays' second consecutive top forty hit on this chart.

== Music video ==
The music video for "Up" was directed by Harvey B. Brown, director of the music video for the group's previous single "If This Is Love". The video was shot on 30 July 2008. Shots from the video leaked onto the internet on 8 August 2008. The video was to premiere on Yahoo! on 1 September 2008 but due to a technical fault, it instead premiered a day later on 2 September.

At the start of the video, the Saturdays are seen fast-like robot dancing. Then the women are seen walking onto platforms which go up into the air. The Saturdays have different colour microphones, matching the colour of the tights that they are wearing: orange for Sandford, blue for Healy, red for Wiseman, yellow for King, and pink for White. All five wear different types of black dresses, and black high heels. They all have matching colour accessories, to match their tights and mics, e.g. rings, bags and sunglasses. They all do the same dance routine, while together on the music video. On the music video there are platforms which go up into the air, and the Saturdays are seen jumping onto them, while they are moving. As the chorus breaks in and says I'm ready for the lift up, keep steady beat, the girl-group are standing on the platforms being taken up into the sky. As the lyrics state Cus I'm ready for the big jump, Keep up with me, Healy is seen jumping from one of the platforms which is going up, to another. King and Sandford are seen falling as they have missed one of the platforms, but in the lyrics it states that we are going to go on and will leave them, but they finally find another platform and jump onto it and go back up to catch up to the other girls. Then later the Saturdays are seen throwing and dropping things off the platforms, which you see falling later on in the video, e.g. gloves, bags and coats. The ending of the video is how the video started.

The song used as dubbed over theme song for the 19th Annual edition of WWE pay-per-view SummerSlam in 2006, replacing both original theme songs "Cobrastyle" by Teddybears featuring Mad Cobra and "The Enemy" by Godsmack – which was used from SummerSlam: The Complete Anthology Vol. 4 Disc 19 DVD on WWE Home Video released on 5 August 2008.

== Live performances ==
The Saturdays started promoting "Up" on various television programmes in September 2008 when the group performed "Up" live at the 2008 Nickelodeon Kids Choice Awards. On 4 October 2008 the single was performed by the girl band on BBC television series Sound where the group also did an interview. "Up" was then performed on Channel 4 show Everybody Loves Lil' Chris on 10 October and then again GMTV on 11 October 2008. The Saturdays performed "Up" on British breakfast television series This Morning on 27 October 2008; Sandford was undergoing appendix surgery at the time and therefore was not present at this particular performance.

On 3 January 2009, the group performed the song along with "If This Is Love" and "Issues" at G-A-Y. The girls wore sequined miniskirts and big hair during the performance.

"Up" featured as the setlist closing performance in the group's first solo tour, The Work Tour. They performed it at twenty-six different venues in the United Kingdom and the Philippines between June and August 2009. During their performance, the group wears different coloured glitter outfits. Catrin Pascoe of the Western Mail positively reviewed a performance of the song on the tour, mentioning: "[...] they got me up on my feet dancing and singing along. [...] for their biggest performance yet, the five girls did themselves proud, leaving me wishing they needed a sixth member."

The Saturdays performed Up along with their current single 30 Days at Birmingham Pride on 2 June 2012.

== Formats and track listings ==
These are the formats and track listings for the major single releases of "Up":

- CD single
  (1785660, Released: 13 October 2008)
1. "Up" (Radio Edit) – 3:25
2. "Crashing Down" (Ben Findon, Mike Myers, Robert Puzey) – 3:10
- iTunes Single
  (Released: 12 October 2008)
1. "Up" (Radio Edit) – 3:25
2. "Up" (Wideboys Remix) – 6:00
- Digital Single
  (Released: 12 October 2008)
1. "Up" (Radio Edit) – 3:25
2. "Up" (Wideboys Radio Edit) – 3:01
- The Remixes
  (Released: 13 October 2008)
1. "Up" (Wideboys Club Remix) – 6:00
2. "Up" (Riffs & Rays Club Remix) – 7:00
3. "Up" (Sticky Club Remix) – 5:17
4. "Up" (Wideboys Dub) – 6:01
5. "Up" (Sticky Dub) – 5:20
6. "Up" (Wideboys Radio Edit) – 3:01
7. "Up" (Riffs & Rays Radio Edit) – 3:37
8. "Up" (Sticky Radio Edit) – 3:17
9. "Up" (Radio Edit) – 3:25
- Revamped Version
1. "Up" (Radio Edit) – 3:24
2. "Crashing Down" – 3:10
3. "Up" (Wideboys Remix Edit) – 3:01
4. "Up" (Sticky Radio Edit) – 3:13
5. "Up" (Riffs & Rays Radio Edit) – 3:22
6. "Up" (Wideboys Club Mix) – 6:00
7. "Up" (Sticky Club Mix) – 5:12
8. "Up" (Riffs & Rays Club Remix) – 6:57

== Official versions ==
- "Up" (Hypersonic Mix) – 2:49
- "Up" (Wideboys Remix Edit) – 3:01
- "Up" (Sticky Radio Edit) – 3:17
- "Up" (Radio Edit) – 3:25
- "Up" (Riffs & Rays Radio Edit) – 3:37
- "Up" (Album Version) – 4:04
- "Up" (Sticky Club Remix) – 5:17
- "Up" (Sticky Dub) – 5:20
- "Up" (Wideboys Club Remix) – 6:00
- "Up" (Riffs & Rays Club Remix) – 7:00

== Credits and personnel ==
- Songwriting – Josef Larossi, Andreas Romdhane, Ina Wroldsen
- Production – Quiz & Larossi, Jeremy Wheatley
- Instruments and programming – Quiz & Larossi, Fiasco
- Recording – Ina Wroldsen
- Engineering – Graham Archer
- Main vocals – Una Healy, Mollie King, Frankie Sandford, Vanessa White, Rochelle Wiseman
- Backing vocals – Una Healy, Vanessa White, Rochelle Wiseman
- Mixing – Jeremy Wheatley, Richard Edgeler
- Mastering – Dick Beetham

== Charts and certifications ==
=== Weekly charts ===
Chart (2008)	Peak position
European Hot 100 Singles (Billboard)	18
Ireland (IRMA)	11
Scotland Singles (OCC)	4
UK Singles (OCC)	5

=== Year-end charts ===
Chart (2008)	Position
UK Singles Chart	71

Chart (2009)	Position
UK Singles Chart	113

=== Certifications ===
Region	Certification	Certified units/sales
United Kingdom (BPI)	Gold	400,000

== Release history ==
Country	Date	Format	Label
United Kingdom	12 October 2008	CD, digital download	Fascination, Polydor
Ireland	13 October 2008	CD, digital download	Fascination, Polydor
