= Just Can't Get Enough (Depeche Mode song) =

1981 single by Depeche Mode

- 12-inch single picture sleeve

Single by Depeche Mode

from the album Speak & Spell
- B-side: "Any Second Now" (UK); "Tora! Tora! Tora!" (US)
- Released: 7 September 1981
- Recorded: July 1981
- Studio: Blackwing (London)
- Genre: Synth-pop; new wave
- Length: 3:41 (7″ version); 6:46 (12″ version)
- Label: Mute
- Songwriter: Vince Clarke
- Producers: Depeche Mode; Daniel Miller

Depeche Mode singles chronology
"New Life" (1981)	"Just Can't Get Enough" (1981)	"See You" (1982)

Music video
- "Just Can't Get Enough" on YouTube

"Just Can't Get Enough" is a song by the English electronic band Depeche Mode. It was their third single, released on 7 September 1981, a month before the release of their debut studio album, Speak & Spell. It was recorded during the summer of that year at Blackwing Studios, and was the band's first single to be released in the United States, on 18 February 1982. A riff-driven synth-pop song, "Just Can't Get Enough" was the final single to be written by founding member Vince Clarke, who left the band in December 1981.

== Background and recording ==
Depeche Mode had released two singles up to this point, "Dreaming of Me" and "New Life", which had reached numbers 57 and 11 on the UK singles charts, respectively, when they were released in early- and mid-1981.

Vince Clarke told Rolling Stone magazine in the year 2000 that Spandau Ballet's "To Cut a Long Story Short" inspired him to write "Just Can't Get Enough". He admitted, "Up to that point, I didn't like dance music or disco at all." Upon hearing the Spandau Ballet song, however, he said, "It was the first time I was actually impressed by a rhythm that went 'boom-thwack, boom-thwack, boom-thwack.' It was the first time I discovered dance music for myself, and to write a song around that rhythm was quite a revelation for me. 'Just Can't Get Enough' came out of that."

"Just Can't Get Enough" was recorded at Blackwing Studios, where Depeche Mode had recorded all their singles up to this point.

== Release ==
"Just Can't Get Enough" was released in the UK by Mute Records on 7 September 1981, on 7" and 12" vinyl, with catalogue numbers 7MUTE016 and 12MUTE016. The 7" single was also released in Spain by RCA Records and Brazil by Fermata Records.

The single's B-side, "Any Second Now", was the first commercially available Depeche Mode instrumental. It is included on the UK re-release of Speak & Spell. A version including vocals (the first Depeche Mode vocals to be handled by Martin Gore) appeared on the album as "Any Second Now (Voices)". There is also an extended version, the "altered" mix. In the United States, the B-side is "Tora! Tora! Tora!". On the album, "Tora! Tora! Tora!" is crossfaded with the previous track, "Photographic", but on the single, the introduction is clean.

== Commercial performance ==
The single reached number 8 on the UK Singles Chart and number 26 on the US Hot Dance Club Play chart, making it their highest-charting single at the time on both counts. It also became the band's first (and biggest) hit in Australia, reaching number 4. A live version became a top ten hit in the Netherlands and Belgium in 1985. It was reported that, at its peak, the single was selling 60,000 copies a week. The success of the single, and its predecessors, convinced band members Dave Gahan to quit university and Martin Gore and Andrew Fletcher to quit their day jobs, so they could all focus on the future of the band.

== Critical reception ==
Professional ratings
Review scores
Source	Rating
AllMusic	4.5/5 stars

Upon its release, Smash Hits reviewer Tim De Lisle found the song "A less memorable but sound enough follow-up to "New Life"; well executed and good for dancing." A review in Melody Maker reviewed the song negatively, saying "Just Can't Get Enough: I can, you will. Catchy, disposable." Record World said that "music box synthesizers toy with a catchy melody line and a chorus chants the title over and over again while a tape-recorded rhythm track provides the dance beat."

In 2017, Billboard magazine included "Just Can't Get Enough" on their list of Top 20 Depeche Mode songs.

== Music video ==
The "Just Can't Get Enough" video, directed by Clive Richardson, was the band's first, and is the only video by the band to feature Vince Clarke.

The exterior scenes in the video are filmed at the Southbank Centre that is, the undercroft and a now demolished stairway at the eastern corner of the Royal Festival Hall.

== Live versions ==
A live version recorded at the London Hammersmith Odeon on 25 October 1982 was featured on the 1983 "Love, in Itself" 12″ single. It was never released as a single A-side, but was played extensively on Radio Veronica by various DJs and entered the Dutch and Belgian charts, making the Top 10 (even though the "Love, in Itself" 12″ officially did not qualify for the singles chart, as it was labelled a mini-album).

The song was also performed on the 1987–88 Music for the Masses Tour, released on 101 (1988), the 2013–15 The Delta Machine Tour, released on Live in Berlin (2014), the 2017–18 Global Spirit Tour, released on Spirits in the Forest (2020), and the 2023–24 Memento Mori World Tour, released on Depeche Mode: M (2025).

== Usage in association football ==
Charity single "Just Can't Get Enough" by the Good Child Foundation

In 2009, the song was adapted as a football chant by fans of Celtic F.C., specifically the Green Brigade fans.

In an interview with football website Goal.com, Depeche Mode keyboardist Andy Fletcher commented on the use of the song by Celtic fans: "We feel honoured that the Celtic faithful are chanting our songs and are touched by it. The best thing is that they know the entire lyrics."

The football chant was also sung by Thai children from the Good Child Foundation also known as the Thai Tims, made up of children with Down syndrome. The song had been taught to them by Reamonn Gormley, a young Celtic youth team player and avid Celtic fan from the Scottish town of Blantyre who had gone to Thailand as a volunteer English language teacher for Good Child Foundation and would use English songs to teach English to them, including, amongst others, Celtic chants. In February 2011, after returning to Blantyre, Gormley was stabbed to death at the age of 19. The Thai Tims' videotaped tribute version of "Just Can't Get Enough" went viral. In memory of Reamonn Gormley, Celtic FC and Celtic Charity Fund released it as a charity single on 8 May 2011 with proceeds going to the Good Child Foundation in Thailand and Crime Stoppers in Scotland. It reached number 30 on the UK Singles Chart and number two on the Scottish Singles Chart.

As it grew in popularity, the song was adapted by fans of other football teams including English Championship side Burnley in January 2011. Also, in February 2011, Liverpool supporters adopted the song as a tribute and encouragement for the club's new Uruguayan attacker Luis Suárez. Depeche Mode's Andy Fletcher, in spite of being a supporter of rival club Chelsea, praised the creativeness of the Liverpool fans who adopted the song. Fletcher said that bandmate Dave Gahan also followed Chelsea, while Martin Gore is a fan of Arsenal.

The song was also played by Nottingham Forest for their former manager Steve Cooper after a home win at the City Ground.

== Track listing ==
All tracks written by Vince Clarke, except "Tora! Tora! Tora!", written by Martin L. Gore

7″: Mute / 7Mute16 (UK)

1. "Just Can't Get Enough" – 3:45
2. "Any Second Now" – 3:08

12″: Mute / 12Mute16 (UK)

1. "Just Can't Get Enough" (Schizo mix) – 6:46
2. "Any Second Now" (altered) – 5:43
- Re-released in 2018 as a part of the Speak & Spell: The 12″ Singles box set

CD: Mute / Intercord Ton GmbH / CDMute16 / INT 826.801 (West Germany) – released in 1988

1. "Just Can't Get Enough" (Schizo mix) – 6:46
2. "Any Second Now" (altered) – 5:43
3. "Just Can't Get Enough" (7″ version) – 3:45

CD: Mute / CDMute16 (UK) – released in 1991

1. "Just Can't Get Enough" – 3:45
2. "Any Second Now" – 3:08
3. "Just Can't Get Enough" (Schizo mix) – 6:46
4. "Any Second Now" (altered) – 5:43

7″: Sire / 50029-7 (US)

1. "Just Can't Get Enough" – 3:45
2. "Tora! Tora! Tora!" (single version) – 4:17

7″: Sire promo single / SRE50029 (US)

1. "Just Can't Get Enough" (edit) (stereo) – 3:42
2. "Just Can't Get Enough" (edit) (mono) – 3:42

7″: Sire promo single / SRE50029 (US)

1. "Just Can't Get Enough" – 3:42
2. "Tora! Tora! Tora!" – 4:23

12″: Sire promo maxi-single / PRO-A-999 (US)

1. "Just Can't Get Enough" – 6:41
2. "New Life" – 3:56

CD: Sire / 40291-2 (US) – released in 1991

1. "Just Can't Get Enough" – 3:45
2. "Any Second Now" – 3:08
3. "Just Can't Get Enough" (Schizo mix) – 6:46
4. "Any Second Now" (altered) – 5:43

== Personnel ==
Credits sourced from Classic Pop and Electronics & Music Maker

Depeche Mode

- Dave Gahan – lead and backing vocals
- Martin Gore – Yamaha CS-5 synthesiser, Korg KR-55 drum machine, backing vocals
- Vince Clarke – Kawai 100F and Roland Jupiter-4 synthesisers, backing vocals
- Andy Fletcher – Moog Prodigy synthesiser, backing vocals

Additional musicians

- Daniel Miller – ARP 2600 programming, Roland MC-4 Microcomposer sequencer

== Charts ==
=== Weekly charts ===
Weekly chart performance for "Just Can't Get Enough"
Chart (1981–1982)	Peak position
Australia (Kent Music Report)	4
Belgium (Ultratop 50 Flanders)	30
Ireland (IRMA)	16
New Zealand (Recorded Music NZ)	29
Spain (AFYVE)	18
Sweden (Sverigetopplistan)	14
UK Singles (Official Charts)	8
UK Indie (MRIB)	1
US Dance Club Songs (Billboard) with "Nodisco"	26

Chart (1985)	Peak position
Belgium (Ultratop 50 Flanders)	8
Netherlands (Dutch Top 40)	5
Netherlands (Single Top 100)	10

Chart (2011)	Peak position
Scottish Singles Sales (Official Charts)	26
UK Singles (Official Charts)	74

Chart (2013)	Peak position
France (SNEP)	146

=== Year-end charts ===
Year-end chart performance for "Just Can't Get Enough"
Chart (1982)	Position
Australia (Kent Music Report)	45

Chart (1985)	Position
Belgium (Ultratop 50 Flanders)	80
Netherlands (Dutch Top 40)	52
Netherlands (Single Top 100)	55

== Certifications ==
Certifications for "Just Can't Get Enough"
Region	Certification	Certified units/sales
Denmark (IFPI Danmark)	Gold	45,000^{‡}
Germany (BVMI)	Gold	250,000^{‡}
Italy (FIMI)	Platinum	100,000^{‡}
New Zealand (RMNZ)	Platinum	30,000^{‡}
Portugal (AFP)	Gold	20,000^{‡}
Spain (Promusicae)	Platinum	60,000^{‡}
United Kingdom (BPI)	2× Platinum	1,200,000^{‡}
United States (RIAA)	Platinum	1,000,000^{‡}
^{‡} Sales+streaming figures based on certification alone.

== The Saturdays version ==
"Just Can't Get Enough"

Single by the Saturdays

from the album Chasing Lights (reissue)
- B-side: "Golden Rules"
- Released: 1 March 2009
- Genre: Dance-pop; electropop; synth-pop
- Length: 3:08 (radio mix)
- Label: Polydor
- Songwriter: Vince Clarke
- Producers: David Eriksen; Max Herman

The Saturdays singles chronology
"Issues" (2009)	"Just Can't Get Enough" (2009)	"Work" (2009)

Music video
- "Just Can't Get Enough" on YouTube

"Just Can't Get Enough" was covered by English-Irish girl group the Saturdays. It was one of the official Comic Relief singles for 2009.

=== Chart performance ===
On 8 March 2009, the song entered the UK Singles Chart at number two, where it peaked, being beaten by Flo Rida's "Right Round" after being at number one in the midweek count, thus being the first Comic Relief single not to chart at number one in 14 years. However, it gave the Saturdays their highest chart placing at the time, outpeaking the original track, in addition to marking their fourth consecutive top ten hit in the UK. The success of this single was later matched by "Forever Is Over" and beaten by "What About Us". In Scotland, the song reached number one for a week, becoming their highest-charting single on that chart alongside "What About Us". In 2010, it received a Silver certification from the BPI for sales exceeding 200,000 copies.

=== Music video ===
The music video premiered on MSN on 9 February 2009. The video shows each girl singing in a mock-'50s pin-up calendar and uses a different edit of the song, known as the "video mix", rather than the single version. It was directed by Harvey B-Brown.

=== Track listing ===
CD single
(released 2 March 2009)

1. "Just Can't Get Enough" (radio mix) – 3:08
2. "Golden Rules" – 3:50

Digital single
(released 1 March 2009)

1. "Just Can't Get Enough" (radio mix) – 3:08
2. "Just Can't Get Enough" (video mix) – 3:19
3. "Just Can't Get Enough" (Wideboys club mix) – 5:08
4. "Just Can't Get Enough" video – 3:32 (iTunes edition only)

Revamped version

1. "Just Can't Get Enough" (radio mix) – 3:08
2. "Golden Rules" – 3:50
3. "Just Can't Get Enough" (video mix) – 3:19
4. "Just Can't Get Enough" (Wideboys club mix) – 5:08

=== Charts ===
==== Weekly charts ====
Weekly chart performance for "Just Can't Get Enough"
Chart (2009)	Peak position
Europe (Eurochart Hot 100 Singles)	10
Hungary (Rádiós Top 40)	11
Ireland (IRMA)	6
Scottish Singles Sales (Official Charts)	1
Slovakia Airplay (ČNS IFPI)	94
UK Singles (Official Charts)	2

==== Year-end charts ====
Year-end chart performance for "Just Can't Get Enough"
Chart (2009)	Position
UK Singles (OCC)	68

=== Certifications ===
Certifications for "Just Can't Get Enough"
Region	Certification	Certified units/sales
United Kingdom (BPI)	Gold	400,000^{‡}
^{‡} Sales+streaming figures based on certification alone.

== Other notable versions ==
In 1990, Spanish act Latino Party sampled "Just Can't Get Enough" for "Tequila", the second single from their debut album No Limits, which became a classic in Spanish bars. In France, it reached number eight on the French Singles Chart in February 1991 and charted for 15 weeks in the top 50; it also reached number 33 in Germany and number 42 in the Flanders region of Belgium.
