= Digital Dog =

English remix/production duo

Digital Dog are an English remix/production duo consisting of Steve Cornish and Nick Mace. The duo also produce under the aliases Jack Rokka and Elek-Tro Junkies.

Digital Dog's 2007 collaboration with Betty Boo, "Take Off", topped the UK Indie Chart and reached No. 92 on the UK Singles Chart. Two of the duo's more recent singles, "Clothes Off" and "Dirty", were released through Ministry of Sound. The duo also collaborated with Cyndi Lauper, co-writing the track "Give It Up" that appeared on Lauper's 2008 album, Bring Ya to the Brink.

== Discography ==
=== Remixes (as Digital Dog) ===
- Adam Lambert - "Never Close Our Eyes" (2012)
- Alex Serena - "Music Machine" (2013)
- Alexandra Burke - "Broken Heels" (Syco, 2009)
- Alexandra Burke - "Let It Go" (2012)
- Alexis Houston - "Actions" (2014)
- Alphabeat - "The Spell" (Polydor, 2009)
- Anastacia - "Staring at the Sun" (2014)
- Andy Bell - "Non-Stop" (Mute, 2010)
- Ariana & the Rose - "In Your Bed" (2014)
- Ashley Roberts - "Woman Up" (2014)
- Avenue - "Last Goodbye" (Island Records, 2008)
- Basshunter - "Saturday" (Dance Nation, 2010)
- Beach Girl5 - "Scratch" (2010)
- Brick & Lace - "Bad To Di Bone" (Geffen, 2009)
- Britney Spears - "Womanizer" (Polydor, 2008)
- Carly Rae Jepsen - "This Kiss" (2012)
- Cascada - "Never Ending Dream" (Zooland Records, 2006)
- Cascada - "Perfect Day" (Robbins, 2009)
- Cher Lloyd featuring Mike Posner - "With Ur Love" (Syco, 2011)
- Cheryl Cole - "Promise This" (Fascination, 2010)
- Chipmunk - "Oopsy Daisy" (Sony, 2009)
- Chlöe Howl - "Paper Heart" (2013)
- Chris Cornell - "Long Gone" (Mosley, 2008)
- Ciara - "Get Up"
- Daisy Dares You ft. Chipmunk - "Number One Enemy" (Sony, 2010)
- Demi Lovato ft. Cher Lloyd - "Really Don't Care" (2014)
- Duffy - "Well, Well, Well"
- Edward Maya & Vika Jigulina - "Stereo Love" (Sony, 2010)
- Edward Maya & Vika Jigulina - "This Is My Life" (Sony, 2010)
- Elan Lea - "Right Anyway" (Mutha Deer, 2010)
- Ellie Goulding - "Goodness Gracious" (2014)
- Enrique Iglesias ft. Nicole Scherzinger - "Heartbeat" (Universal, 2010)
- Erasure - "Fill Us With Fire" (Mute, 2012)
- Gali - "Dancing To Another Love Song" (2012)
- Hannah - "Keeping Score" (2009)
- Hollywood Undead - "Levitate" (Polydor, 2011)
- Ida Maria - "I Like You So Much Better When You're Naked" (Sony, 2008)
- Jade Ewen - "It's My Time" (Polydor, 2009)
- JLS - "Beat Again" (Sony, 2009)
- Kaci Battaglia - "Crazy Possessive" (Curb Records, 2009)
- Kaci Battaglia - "I Can't Help Myself" (Curb Records, 2007)
- Kamaliya - "Crazy in My Heart" (2012)
- Kamaliya - "Make Up Your Mind" (2012)
- Kamaliya - "Rozovy Zakat" (2013)
- Kamaliya - "Cto Za Beda" (2013)
- Kimberly Caldwell - "Desperate Girls & Stupid Boys" (Capitol Records, 2011)
- Kleerup ft. Marit Bergman - "3AM" (EMI, 2008)
- Kreesha Turner - "Don't Call Me Baby" (EMI, 2008)
- Keisha White - "Butterflies" (2012)
- Kristine W - "Busted" (2012)
- Kyrah - "Uh Oh" (2010)
- Lady Sovereign - "Those Were The Days" (Island, 2007)
- Locnville - "Sun In My Pockets" (ContraBanned, 2010)
- Miley Cyrus - "Fly on the Wall" (Hollywood, 2009)
- Neon Jungle - "Welcome to the Jungle" (Sony Music, 2014)
- Nicola Roberts - "Lucky Day" (Fascination, 2011)
- Pet Shop Boys - "Memory of the Future" (EMI, 2012)
- P!nk - "Funhouse" (Sony/RCA, 2009)
- P!nk - "Leave Me Alone (I'm Lonely)" (Sony BMG, 2007)
- P!nk - "Please Don't Leave Me" (Sony/RCA, 2009)
- Pixie Lott - "Turn It Up" (Sony, 2010)
- Plumb - "Cut" (Curb, 2009)
- Plumb - "Hang On" (Curb, 2009)
- Olly Murs - "Please Don't Let Me Go" (Epic, 2010)
- Ono - "Move on Fast" (Mind Train/TWISTED, 2011)
- Overkillers - "Cash Me Up" (Sony BMG)
- Rihanna - "SOS" (Def Jam / Universal, 2005) (2007 Remixes [Featured on second format CD release])
- Rita Ora - "I Will Never Let You Down" (2014)
- Robin Thicke ft. Estelle - "Rollacoasta" (Interscope, 2010)
- Rosie & the Goldbug - "Heartbreak" (Lover Records, 2009)
- R.O.R.C - "Its Liquid Engineering" (2008)
- Sariah - "All About Sex" (Reigning Hearts Record, 2011)
- Scissor Sisters - "Fire with Fire" (EMI, 2010)
- Sliimy - "Wake Up" (Warner Music France, 2010)
- Sneaky Sound System - "Pictures" (Whack, 2006)
- Sophie Ellis-Bextor - "Catch You" (Polydor, 2007)
- Star Pilots - "In The Heat Of The Night" (MOS, 2008)
- Sun - "Fancy Free" (Warner, 2010)
- Taio Cruz - "I Can Be" (Island Def Jam, 2008)
- Taylor Swift - "Love Story" (Big Machine, 2009)
- Temple Cloud - "One Big Family" (2011)
- The Green Children - "Dragons" (Spinside Records, 2010)
- The Jonas Brothers - "Fly With Me" (Hollywood, 2009)
- The Pussycat Dolls - "I Hate This Part" (Interscope, 2008)
- The Pussycat Dolls - "When I Grow Up" (Interscope, 2008)
- The Pussycat Dolls ft. Snoop Dogg - "Bottle Pop" (Interscope, 2009)
- The Ready Set - "Love Like Woe" (Beluga Heights, 2010)
- The Saturdays - "Issues" (Polydor, 2009)
- The Saturdays - "My Heart Takes Over" (Polydor, 2011)
- The Wanted - "All Time Low" (Geffen, 2010)
- The Wanted - "Lightning" (Geffen, 2011)
- Timbaland ft. Katy Perry - "If We Ever Meet Again" (Interscope, 2010)
- Utada - "Dirty Desire" (Def Jam, 2009)
- The Vamps - "Wild Heart" (2014)
- Velvet - "Chemistry" (2007)
- Wamdue Project ft. Jonathan Mendelsohn - "Forgiveness" (Fierce Angel, 2006)
- Wynonna Judd - "Sing" (Asylum-Curb, 2009)
- Zarif - "Over" (2011)
- 50 Cent ft. Ne-Yo - "Baby By Me" (Interscope, 2009)

=== Remixes (as Jack Rokka) ===
- Christian George - "Strangers"
- Dannii Minogue vs. Jason Nevins - "Touch Me Like That" (AATW) [as Jack Rokka]
- ElectroVamp - "I Don't Like Vibe In the VIP"
- Planet Soul - "Set U Free"
- R.O.R.C - Its Liquid Engineering
- Jack Rokka vs. Betty Boo - "Take Off"
- Trashcan Jack vs. Billy Idol - "Club Wedding" (Frenetic) [as Jack Rokka]
- Wideboys feat. Majestic, B-Live & Boy Better Know - "In The V.I.P."

=== Other remixes ===
- Congress - "40 Miles 2007" (AATW)
- Georgie Porgie - "Lift Your Voices" (Music Plant U.S.)
- Unklejam - "Stereo" (Virgin)
- Electrovamp - I Don't Like The Vibe In The V.I.P. (Island) [as Jack Rokka]
- T-Empo - "Saturday Night Sunday Morning" (Gusto/Gut)
- The Wideboys - "Bomb The Secret" (AATW)
- Armand Van Helden - "J’Taime" (Southern Fried)
- Les Adams - "Twisted" (Southern Fried)
- Blue Ray Ft Jimmy Somerville - "You & Me" (AATW)
- Fatboy Slim - "Champion Sound" (Skint)
- INXS - "Never Let You Go" (MX3 Records) [Featured on INXS album]
- Alex Gold Ft Phil Oakey - "L.A. Today" (Xtravaganza)
- Sterling Void - "Alright" (Xtravaganza)
- Soulshaker - "Hypnotic Erotic Games" (Gusto/Gut)
- Nu-Electric - "No Matter What" (Free2Air)
- Hotsnaxx - "Magic" (Positiva / Full Phat Productions)
- Benson & Hedges - "That Bleepy Track" (New State Ent.)
- Ultra Nate - "Automatic" (Tommy Boy U.S. / AATW)
- Thriller Jill - "When Love Calls" (in.stinct) [as Elek-Tro Junkies]
- Dayeene - "And It Hurts" (Stoneyboy) [as Elek-Tro Junkies]
- Christian George - Strangers
- Tommy Sparks - She's Got Me Dancing
- Planet Soul - Set U Free 2008 [as Jack Rokka]

=== Productions ===
- Cyndi Lauper - Give it up (Bring ya to the brink)
- Digital Dog – "Clothes Off" (COVER) (Boss / MOS/DATA)
- Digital Dog - "Firing Line"
- Estello featuring Pitbull & Roscoe Umali - "Till The Stars Come Out" (ORIGINAL)
- Digital Dog - "Dirty" (ORIGINAL) (MOS/DATA)
- Therese - "Feelin' Me" (ORIGINAL) (Positiva)
- Therese - "Neon Lights (See My Baby)" (ORIGINAL) (Positiva)
- Elek-Tro Junkies - "Don't Hold Out On Me" (ORIGINAL) (Fierce Angel)
- Elek-Tro Junkies - "Good Bye" (ORIGINAL)
- Jack Rokka VS Betty Boo- "Take Off" (ORIGINAL) (Gut)
- Kelly Mueller "Sun Staring" (ORIGINAL) (Audiofreaks)

=== Compilations ===
- The Annual 2009 'Ministry of Sound'
- Floorfillers 2008'
- The Annual 2008 'Ministry of Sound'
- Mash Up Mix 2008 'Ministry of Sound'
- Dancemix 2008
- The Pacha Experience 2
- Maximum Bass 2007 - 'Ministry of Sound'
- Clubland 11 - 'All Around the World'
- Judgement Sundays 2007 - 'Ministry of Sound'
- Big Tunes X-Rated - 'Ministry of Sound'
- Funky House Sessions 2006 - 'Ministry of Sound'
- Clubbers Guide Summer 2006 - 'Ministry of Sound'
- Big Tunes 3 - 'Ministry of Sound'
- The Annual 2006 - 'Ministry of Sound'
- Judgement Sundays The True Sound Of Ibiza - 'Ministry of Sound'
- Clubland 10 - 'All Around the World'
- Ibiza Annual 2005 'Ministry of Sound'
- Clubbers Guide Summer 2005 - 'Ministry of Sound'
