= List of number-one singles of 2010 (Ireland) =

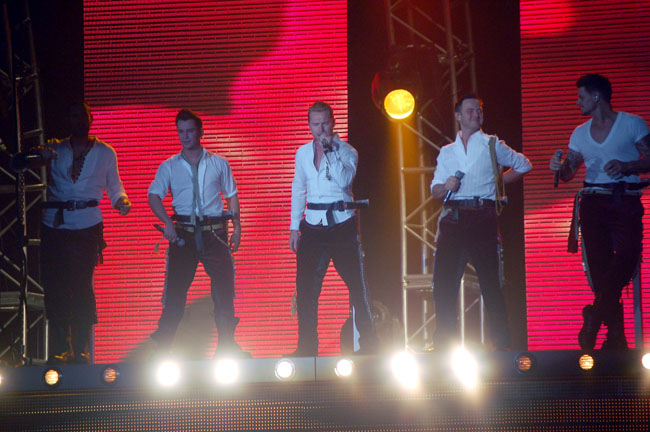
Irish Boy Band Boyzone, gained their ninth number one when Gave It All Away debuted at number one

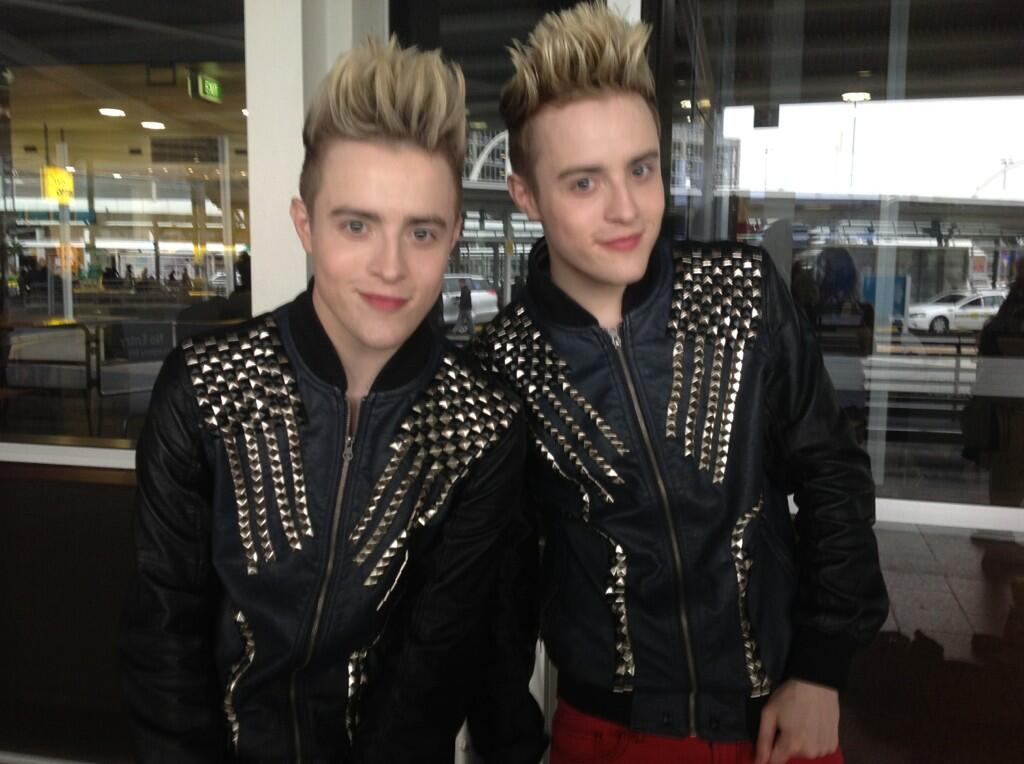
Irish Duo Jedward's debut single, Under Pressure (Ice Ice Baby) was number one for four non-consecutive weeks.

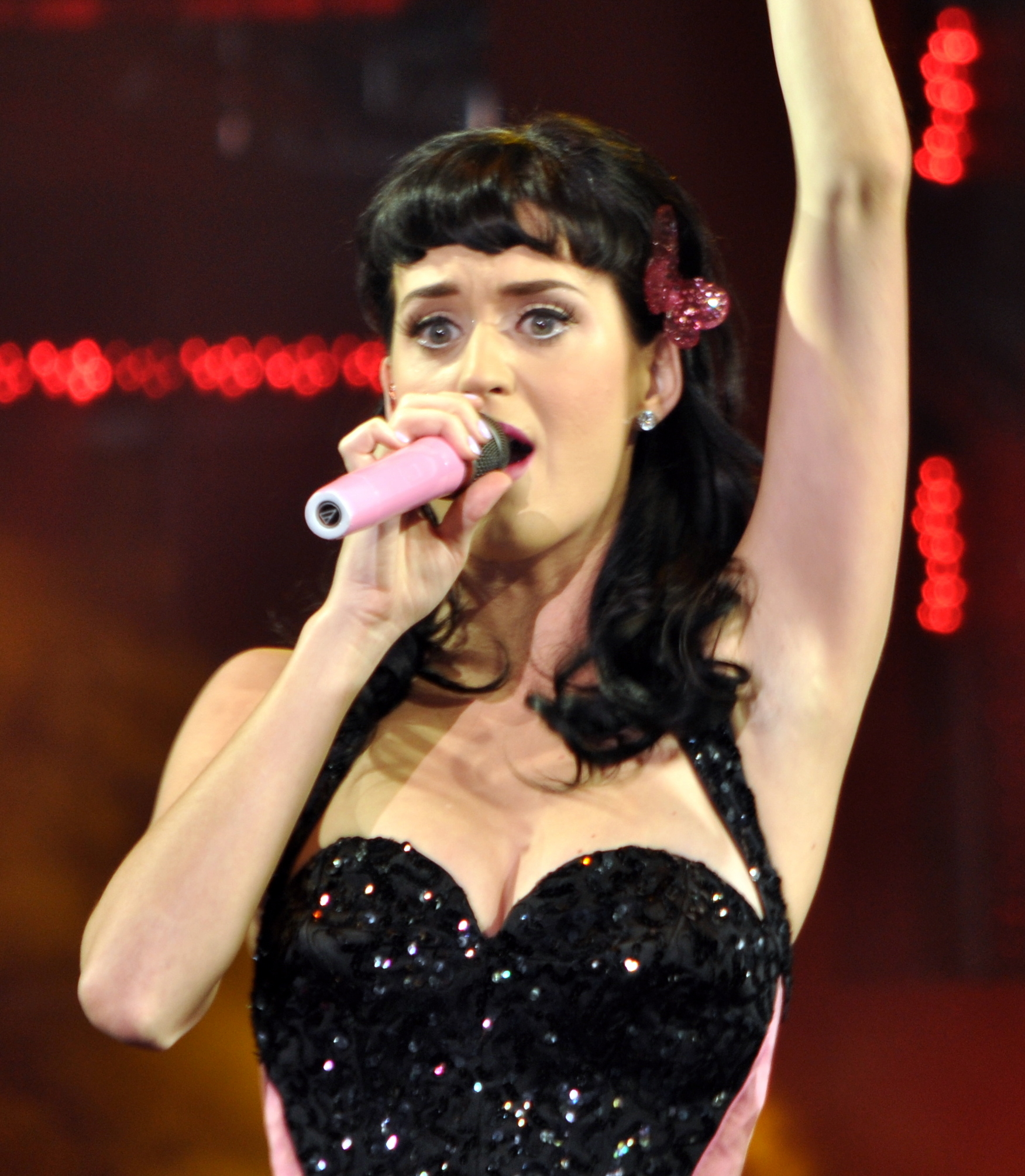
Pop star Katy Perry gained her second and third number one single in 2010 with California Gurls and Teenage Dream.

This is a list of the IRMA's Irish Singles Chart Top 50 number-ones of 2010.

| Issue date | Song | Artist |
|---|---|---|
| January 7 | "The Climb" | Joe McElderry |
| January 14 | "Bad Romance" | Lady Gaga |
| January 21 | "Fireflies" | Owl City |
| January 28 | "Fireflies" | Owl City |
| February 4 | "Under Pressure (Ice Ice Baby)" | Jedward featuring Vanilla Ice |
| February 11 | "Everybody Hurts" | Helping Haiti |
| February 18 | "Under Pressure (Ice Ice Baby)" | Jedward featuring Vanilla Ice |
| February 25 | "Under Pressure (Ice Ice Baby)" | Jedward featuring Vanilla Ice |
| March 4 | "Gave It All Away" | Boyzone |
| March 11 | "Under Pressure (Ice Ice Baby)" | Jedward featuring Vanilla Ice |
| March 18 | "Gave It All Away" | Boyzone |
| March 25 | "Telephone" | Lady Gaga featuring Beyoncé |
| April 1 | "Telephone" | Lady Gaga featuring Beyoncé |
| April 8 | "Telephone" | Lady Gaga featuring Beyoncé |
| April 15 | "Telephone" | Lady Gaga featuring Beyoncé |
| April 22 | "Gives You Hell" | Glee Cast |
| April 29 | "OMG" | Usher featuring will.i.am |
| May 6 | "OMG" | Usher featuring will.i.am |
| May 13 | "Hey, Soul Sister" | Train |
| May 20 | "All Night Long" | Alexandra Burke featuring Pitbull |
| May 27 | "Stereo Love" | Edward Maya and Vika Jigulina |
| June 3 | "Stereo Love" | Edward Maya and Vika Jigulina |
| June 10 | "Stereo Love" | Edward Maya and Vika Jigulina |
| June 17 | "Stereo Love" | Edward Maya and Vika Jigulina |
| June 24 | "California Gurls" | Katy Perry featuring Snoop Dogg |
| July 1 | "California Gurls" | Katy Perry featuring Snoop Dogg |
| July 8 | "California Gurls" | Katy Perry featuring Snoop Dogg |
| July 15 | "California Gurls" | Katy Perry featuring Snoop Dogg |
| July 22 | "Love the Way You Lie" | Eminem featuring Rihanna |
| July 29 | "We No Speak Americano" | Yolanda Be Cool and DCUP |
| August 5 | "Club Can't Handle Me" | Flo Rida featuring David Guetta |
| August 12 | "Love the Way You Lie" | Eminem featuring Rihanna |
| August 19 | "Love the Way You Lie" | Eminem featuring Rihanna |
| August 26 | "Dynamite" | Taio Cruz |
| September 2 | "Teenage Dream" | Katy Perry |
| September 9 | "For the First Time" | The Script |
| September 16 | "For the First Time" | The Script |
| September 23 | "For the First Time" | The Script |
| September 30 | "Written in the Stars" | Tinie Tempah featuring Eric Turner |
| October 7 | "Just the Way You Are" | Bruno Mars |
| October 14 | "Just the Way You Are" | Bruno Mars |
| October 21 | "Just the Way You Are" | Bruno Mars |
| October 28 | "Promise This" | Cheryl Cole |
| November 4 | "Only Girl (In the World)" | Rihanna |
| November 11 | "Only Girl (In the World)" | Rihanna |
| November 18 | "Only Girl (In the World)" | Rihanna |
| November 25 | "Heroes" | The X Factor Finalists 2010 |
| December 2 | "Heroes" | The X Factor Finalists 2010 |
| December 9 | "Heroes" | The X Factor Finalists 2010 |
| December 16 | "When We Collide" | Matt Cardle |
| December 23 | "When We Collide" | Matt Cardle |
| December 30 | "When We Collide" | Matt Cardle |

== See also ==
- 2010 in music
- List of artists who reached number one in Ireland
- Irish Singles Chart
