= List of number-one singles of 2010 (Spain) =

This lists the singles that reached number one on the Spanish Promusicae sales and airplay charts in 2010. Total sales correspond to the data sent by regular contributors to sales volumes and by digital distributors. There is a two-days difference between the reporting period from sales outlets and from radio stations. For example, the report period for the first full week of 2010 ended on January 10 for sales and January 8 for airplay.

== Chart history ==
Week	Top-selling				Week	Most airplay			
Week	Issue date	Artist(s)	Song	Reference(s)	Week	Issue date	Artist(s)	Song	Reference(s)
1	January 10	Manuel Carrasco (feat. Malú)	"Que Nadie"		1	January 8	Alejandro Sanz	"Desde Cuándo"	
2	January 17	Lady Gaga	"Bad Romance"		2	January 15	El Canto del Loco	"Quiero Aprender de Ti"	
3	January 24	Lady Gaga	"Bad Romance"		3	January 22	Alejandro Sanz	"Desde Cuándo"	
4	January 31	Lady Gaga	"Bad Romance"		4	January 29	Alejandro Sanz	"Desde Cuándo"	
5	February 7	Lady Gaga	"Bad Romance"		5	February 5	Alejandro Sanz	"Desde Cuándo"	
6	February 14	David Bisbal	"Mi Princesa"		6	February 12	Alejandro Sanz	"Desde Cuándo"	
7	February 21	Estopa (feat. Rosario)	"El Run Run"		7	February 19	Alejandro Sanz	"Desde Cuándo"	
8	February 28	David DeMaría, Pastora Soler & Vanesa Martín	"Himno de Andalucía"		8	February 26	Alejandro Sanz	"Desde Cuándo"	
9	March 7	Estopa (feat. Rosario)	"El Run Run"		9	March 5	Alejandro Sanz	"Desde Cuándo"	
10	March 14	Estopa (feat. Rosario)	"El Run Run"		10	March 12	Alejandro Sanz	"Desde Cuándo"	
11	March 21	Estopa (feat. Rosario)	"El Run Run"		11	March 19	Alejandro Sanz	"Desde Cuándo"	
12	March 28	Estopa (feat. Rosario)	"El Run Run"		12	March 26	Alejandro Sanz	"Desde Cuándo"	
13	April 4	Estopa (feat. Rosario)	"El Run Run"		13	April 2	Alejandro Sanz	"Desde Cuándo"	
14	April 11	Estopa (feat. Rosario)	"El Run Run"		14	April 9	Kesha	"Tik Tok"	
15	April 18	Estopa (feat. Rosario)	"El Run Run"		15	April 16	Kesha	"Tik Tok"	
16	April 25	Carlos Jean (feat. Various artists)	"Ay Haití"		16	April 23	Estopa (feat. Rosario)	"El Run Run"	
17	May 2	Carlos Jean (feat. Various artists)	"Ay Haití"		17	April 30	Estopa (feat. Rosario)	"El Run Run"	
18	May 9	Edward Maya & Vika Jigulina	"Stereo Love"		18	May 7	Shakira	"Gypsy"	
19	May 16	Edward Maya & Vika Jigulina	"Stereo Love"		19	May 14	Shakira	"Gypsy"	
20	May 23	Edward Maya & Vika Jigulina	"Stereo Love"		20	May 21	Estopa (feat. Rosario)	"El Run Run"	
21	May 30	Estopa (feat. Rosario)	"El Run Run"		21	May 28	Shakira	"Gypsy"	
22	June 6	Shakira (feat. Freshlyground)	"Waka Waka (This Time for Africa)"		22	June 4	Andrés Calamaro	"Los Divinos"	
23	June 13	Shakira (feat. Freshlyground)	"Waka Waka (This Time for Africa)"		23	June 11	Andrés Calamaro	"Los Divinos"	
24	June 20	Shakira (feat. Freshlyground)	"Waka Waka (This Time for Africa)"		24	June 18	Shakira	"Gypsy"	
25	June 27	Shakira (feat. Freshlyground)	"Waka Waka (This Time for Africa)"		25	June 25	Shakira (feat. Freshlyground)	"Waka Waka (This Time for Africa)"	
26	July 4	Shakira (feat. Freshlyground)	"Waka Waka (This Time for Africa)"		26	July 2	Shakira (feat. Freshlyground)	"Waka Waka (This Time for Africa)"	
27	July 11	Shakira (feat. Freshlyground)	"Waka Waka (This Time for Africa)"		27	July 9	Shakira (feat. Freshlyground)	"Waka Waka (This Time for Africa)"	
28	July 18	Shakira (feat. Freshlyground)	"Waka Waka (This Time for Africa)"		28	July 16	Shakira (feat. Freshlyground)	"Waka Waka (This Time for Africa)"	
29	July 25	Shakira (feat. Freshlyground)	"Waka Waka (This Time for Africa)"		29	July 23	Shakira (feat. Freshlyground)	"Waka Waka (This Time for Africa)"	
30	August 1	Shakira (feat. Freshlyground)	"Waka Waka (This Time for Africa)"		30	July 30	Shakira (feat. Freshlyground)	"Waka Waka (This Time for Africa)"	
31	August 8	Shakira (feat. Freshlyground)	"Waka Waka (This Time for Africa)"		31	August 6	Shakira (feat. Freshlyground)	"Waka Waka (This Time for Africa)"	
32	August 15	Shakira (feat. Freshlyground)	"Waka Waka (This Time for Africa)"		32	August 13	Shakira (feat. Freshlyground)	"Waka Waka (This Time for Africa)"	
33	August 22	Shakira (feat. Freshlyground)	"Waka Waka (This Time for Africa)"		33	August 20	Shakira (feat. Freshlyground)	"Waka Waka (This Time for Africa)"	
34	August 29	Shakira (feat. Freshlyground)	"Waka Waka (This Time for Africa)"		34	August 27	Shakira (feat. Freshlyground)	"Waka Waka (This Time for Africa)"	
35	September 5	Shakira (feat. Freshlyground)	"Waka Waka (This Time for Africa)"		35	September 3	Lady Gaga	"Alejandro"	
36	September 12	Shakira (feat. Freshlyground)	"Waka Waka (This Time for Africa)"		36	September 10	Alejandro Sanz	"Nuestro Amor Será Leyenda"	
37	September 19	Shakira (feat. Freshlyground)	"Waka Waka (This Time for Africa)"		37	September 17	Lady Gaga	"Alejandro"	
38	September 26	Shakira (feat. Freshlyground)	"Waka Waka (This Time for Africa)"		38	September 24	Lady Gaga	"Alejandro"	
39	October 3	Eminem (feat. Rihanna)	"Love the Way You Lie"		39	October 1	Lady Gaga	"Alejandro"	
40	October 10	Eminem (feat. Rihanna)	"Love the Way You Lie"		40	October 8	Lady Gaga	"Alejandro"	
41	October 17	Eminem (feat. Rihanna)	"Love the Way You Lie"		41	October 15	Lady Gaga	"Alejandro"	
42	October 24	Shakira (feat. El Cata)	"Loca"		42	October 22	Shakira (feat. El Cata)	"Loca"	
43	October 31	Shakira (feat. El Cata)	"Loca"		43	October 29	Shakira (feat. El Cata)	"Loca"	
44	November 7	Shakira (feat. El Cata)	"Loca"		44	November 5	Shakira (feat. El Cata)	"Loca"	
45	November 14	Shakira (feat. El Cata)	"Loca"		45	November 12	Juanes	"Y No Regresas"	
46	November 21	Shakira (feat. El Cata)	"Loca"		46	November 19	Juanes	"Y No Regresas"	
47	November 28	Shakira (feat. El Cata)	"Loca"		47	November 26	Shakira (feat. El Cata)	"Loca"	
48	December 5	Shakira (feat. El Cata)	"Loca"		48	December 3	Melendi	"Barbie de Extrarradio"	
49	December 12	Shakira (feat. El Cata)	"Loca"		49	December 10	Shakira (feat. El Cata)	"Loca"	
50	December 19	Shakira (feat. El Cata)	"Loca"		50	December 17	Shakira (feat. El Cata)	"Loca"	
51	December 26	Amaia Montero	"Chiquitita"		51	December 24	Flo Rida (feat. David Guetta)	"Club Can't Handle Me"	
52	January 2	Shakira (feat. El Cata)	"Loca"		52	December 31	Shakira (feat. El Cata)	"Loca"	
