= Stereo Love =

2009 single by Edward Maya

- One of the various covers used

Single by Edward Maya and Vika Jigulina

from the album The Stereo Love Show
- Released: 23 February 2009
- Genre: Eurodance; techno; trance; popcorn
- Label: Cat
- Songwriters: Eduard Ilie; Victoria Corneva; Eldar Mansurov
- Producers: Ilie; Corneva; Ilie Alexandru

Edward Maya and Vika Jigulina singles chronology
"Stereo Love" (2009)	"This Is My Life" (2009)

Music video
- "Stereo Love" on YouTube

"Stereo Love" is a song by Romanian musician Edward Maya featuring Moldovan-Romanian musician Vika Jigulina. It was released as their debut single on 23 February 2009 for radio airplay in Romania, and was later included on Maya's debut studio album, The Stereo Love Show (2014). The song was written by Maya and Jigulina, while the production was handled by the two alongside Ilie Alexandru; Azerbaijani musician Eldar Mansurov is listed as a composer for the interpolation of the 1989 song "Bayatılar". Mansurov's contribution was initially uncredited, but was later acknowledged through a contract signed between him and Maya in January 2010. It is a Eurodance, techno and trance song with lyrics about lovesickness, and also follows the Romanian popcorn music trend popular around the time of release. The song prominently features an accordion hook.

Music critics gave generally positive reviews of the song upon its release, noting the universal appeal. At the 2011 Billboard Music Awards, the track was awarded "Top Dance Song". Commercially, "Stereo Love" peaked at number two on the Romanian Top 100 in August 2009 and became a worldwide sleeper hit over the next two years. The song was a number-one in Czech Republic, Finland, France, Ireland, Norway, Portugal, Slovakia, Spain and Sweden, and further peaked within the top five in several other countries including Germany, Italy, the Netherlands and the United Kingdom. It has peaked at number 16 on the US Billboard Hot 100, standing as the best-performing Romanian song there. It was the most-played song of 2010 on US dance radio. An alternative North American version of "Stereo Love" released with Mia Martina was a top ten hit in Canada. Maya was alleged not to have approved the release of this version and ended up in a lawsuit with the label Cat Music.

An accompanying music video was released on YouTube on 6 July 2009. Directed by Dragoș Buliga, it was shot in Mykonos, Greece, and sees Maya and Jigulina searching for each other through the streets of the island. For further promotion, the two performed the song at multiple events, including at Spanish award show Los Premios 40 Principales 2010, and on a tour visiting India and the Americas. Among other usage of "Stereo Love", Indian label T-Series released the Hindi "Love Stereo Again" by Tiger Shroff and Zahrah S. Khan in July 2023, which is based on the song.

== Background and release ==
Maya first became involved in the music scene in 2006, when he was a student at the National University of Music Bucharest and contributed songwriting to the Romanian Eurovision Song Contest 2006 entry "Tornerò" performed by Mihai Trăistariu. Subsequently, he worked on songs released by other Romanian acts such as Costi Ioniță and Blaxy Girls, and lent his production to group Akcent's 2009 studio album Fără lacrimi (Without Tears), which spawned the commercially successful singles "Stay with Me" and "That's My Name". Around the release of "Stereo Love", Maya was in a relationship with Jigulina. She had graduated from a music college before working in Romanian clubs and at Romanian radio station Vibe FM.

"Stereo Love" was sent for radio airplay in Romania on 23 February 2009, as Maya's and Jigulina's debut single. It was eventually included as the opening track on Maya's debut studio album The Stereo Love Show (2014). On 6 July 2009, Cat Music made the song available for digital download in several countries, including Romania, Germany, Italy, Spain and the United Kingdom. In France, "Stereo Love" was released in the same format on 19 October 2009 by Play On Records, who also issued a CD single in the country in November. Several remixes of "Stereo Love"—some of which were featured on its physical releases—have been produced, including ones by Eiffel 65 member Gabry Ponte, Dave Ramone, Digital Dog, the Michael Mind Project, Timmy Trumpet, Wildstylez and Sean Finn. A Spanish language version of the song was also released.

In 2009, Spinnin' Records and Do It Yourself Music Group released CDs for "Stereo Love" in the Netherlands and Italy, respectively. The latter label issued another CD in Italy a year later, while B1 Recordings and Universal Music Group jointly distributed a CD in Germany on 7 May 2010. A CD was also distributed in the United Kingdom through All Around the World Records in 2010. The song's release in the United States and Canada was conducted by Ultra Records. On 15 April 2024, a blue-colored 12-inch vinyl was made available in Germany by Dance on the Beat Records.

== Composition ==
Music critics described "Stereo Love" as a Eurodance, techno and trance song. It can also be assigned to the Romanian popcorn genre, which was internationally popular around the time of the song's release. "Stereo Love" is set in the key of C♯ minor and has a tempo of 127 beats per minute (BPM), with the ambitus of the vocals spanning from C♯3 to B4. Fraser McAlpine of BBC described the track as "mournful" and emotional, noting that Jigulina is singing in an "icy" tone to her love interest. The lyrics were written by Maya and Jigulina, while the production was handled by the two alongside Ilie Alexandru. Azerbaijani musician Eldar Mansurov is listed as a composer on "Stereo Love" for an interpolation of the 1989 song "Bayatılar" performed by Azerbaijani singer Brilliant Dadashova in its accordion hook. Leila Cobo of Reuters opined that the accordion melody evoked that of "Lambada" (1989) by French-Brazilian group Kaoma (originally featured in "Llorando se fue" (1982) by Bolivian band Los Kjarkas).

=== Interpolation dispute ===
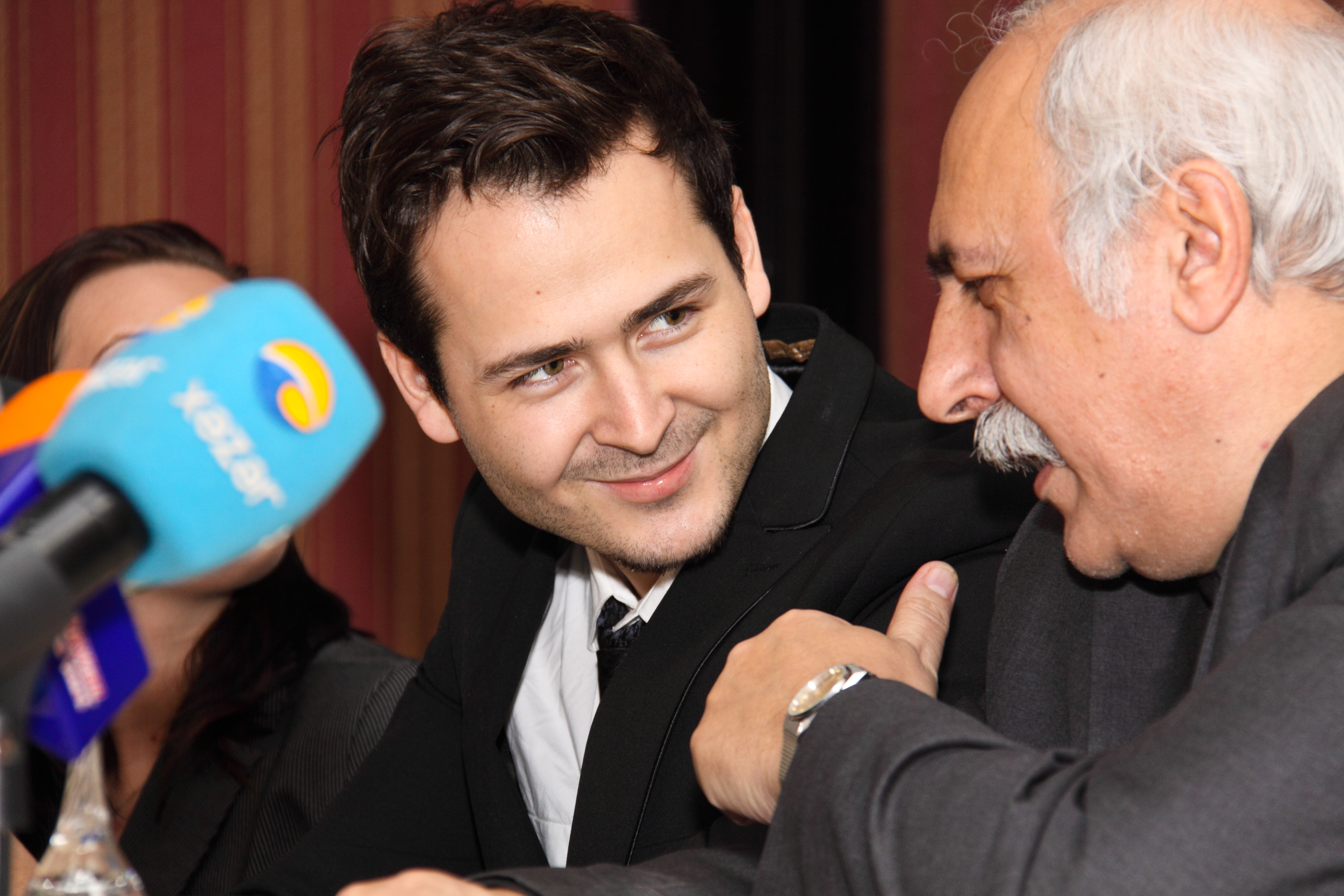
A copyright dispute between Maya (left) and Eldar Mansurov (right) concerning the use of his 1989 composition "Bayatılar" was settled at a Baku press conference in January 2010 (pictured).

The interpolation of Mansurov's work on "Stereo Love" was initially not credited, with observers starting an online debate over whether or not the song was a plagiarism of "Bayatılar". Although ethnomusicologist Elena Sulea noted that Maya had "identically" copied the accordion hook of the latter song, she opined that it was a common motif found in the folklore of Azerbaijan and other countries. Music specialist Horia Moculescu noticed similarities between the two songs, but concluded that they were coincidental. Mansurov eventually issued a complaint at the Romanian Copyright Office upon finding "Stereo Love" on the internet.

Maya stated that he was "captivated" by the melody in the chorus of "Bayatılar" and alleged to have credited Mansurov as "anonymous" upon having unsuccessfully tried to contact him. On 19 January 2010, Maya and Mansurov signed a contract at a press conference in Baku, Azerbaijan, settling the copyright dispute. At the event, Mansurov stated that he was "very glad that for the first time a figure of Azerbaijani culture managed to restore his right".

== Critical reception and accolades ==
McAlpine labelled the use of the accordion in the song as polarizing; this thought was echoed by Maya's North American management, which stated that prior to "Stereo Love", the accordion had rarely been featured in commercially successful music. Jason Birchmeier of AllMusic applauded the track's hook, calling it "memorable". The staff of the New York Daily News reported that several music observers had noticed melodic and structural similarities between "Stereo Love" and American singer Jennifer Lopez's "On the Floor" (2011), suggesting the former was a possible source of inspiration during the creation of the latter. Both Pune Mirror and Complex noted the universal appeal of "Stereo Love", with an editor of the latter publication tracing it back to what they saw as the campy nature of the song. They elaborated: "It's gaudy, it's basic and seems to be ticking off so many boxes of what a 'Euro' dance song should be, that it borders on parody."

In 2010, "Stereo Love" was nominated for a Balkan Music Award for "Best Song in the Balkans from Romania for 2009", as well as for a Romanian Music Award in the "Best Song" category. At the 2011 Billboard Music Awards, "Stereo Love" won the "Top Dance Song" accolade, which was the first win by a Romanian act.

== Commercial performance ==
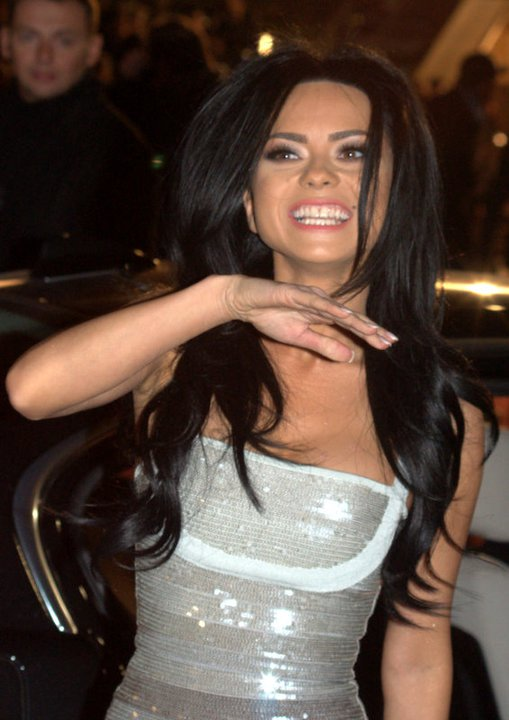
"Stereo Love" was part of a broader movement in which Romanian popcorn music and songs released by artists such as Inna (pictured) became part of the international mainstream.

"Stereo Love" has become one of the most successful Romanian songs. It developed into a sleeper hit in several territories, progressively impacting charts from 2009 to 2011. Meanwhile, Maya and Jigulina released two other singles—"This Is My Life" in November 2009, and "Desert Rain" in November 2010—which also began gaining their own momentum.

"Stereo Love" had a similar commercial trajectory to several other Romanian popcorn songs released around the late 2000s, and was part of the emergence of Romania as a center for Europe's dance music scene. Several songs would first gain traction in clubs in Romanian resorts, and then gradually cross over to Southern and Southeast Europe, as well as to the United Kingdom and German-speaking Europe. In a December 2022 interview, Maya described how he initially felt frustrated with the success of "Stereo Love", as he was fearful of remaining a one-hit wonder. This resulted in a period of him "mak[ing] the same style of music, us[ing] the same accordion, the same voices, in the hopes of surpassing the previous success".

=== Initial success in 2009 ===
"Stereo Love" first attained commercial success in native Romania. It entered the top ten of Nielsen Music Control and Uniunea Producătorilor de Fonograme din România (UPFR)'s radio and television airplay chart at number eight in June 2009. The song went on to peak at number five in August, and also reached number two on the Romanian Top 100―which only measures radio airplay―by the same month. "Stereo Love" further peaked at number two in Greece in August 2009.

From October to November 2009, the track reached number two on the TopHit airplay chart of Russia and the Commonwealth of Independent States (CIS), as well as on the Dutch Single Top 100. It went on to top the French singles chart in December 2009, after having already been a number-one on the digital downloads chart for multiple weeks one month earlier. The track ended up as the 15th most-successful song in the country in both 2009 and 2010. As of February 2010, "Stereo Love" has sold over 92,000 units in France, consisting of over 55,000 digital downloads, and over 36,000 physical copies.

=== Continued success in 2010 and 2011 ===
In February 2010, "Stereo Love" reached its peak at numbers two, seven and two in Switzerland, Flanders and Wallonia, respectively. The track was a number-one hit on the Czech and Slovak radio airplay charts, as well as the Portuguese digital chart in April 2010, and also peaked at number 19 in Canada, where it became certified double platinum. Around the same month, "Stereo Love" reached number one in all Nordic countries, except for Denmark, where the track peaked at number two; among others, it was certified septuple platinum by the Swedish Recording Industry Association (GLF) and octuple platinum by the International Federation of the Phonographic Industry (IFPI) Norway.

By May 2010, the song had topped the Italian, Spanish and Irish singles charts, as well as reached number two and four on the Scottish and UK singles chart, respectively. In Ireland, a cover version of "Stereo Love" by DJ Team was initially also present on the chart for two weeks, peaking at number eight. In both Spain and Italy, "Stereo Love" spent half a year in the top ten, with it eventually receiving double platinum certifications from Productores de Música de España (Promusicae) and Federazione Industria Musicale Italiana (FIMI), respectively. By June, the song had impacted the US Dance/Mix Show Airplay and European Hot 100 Singles charts compiled by Billboard, peaking at positions one and four, respectively. On the latter, it remained for 47 weeks, which is the longest stay in the chart's history. A month later, "Stereo Love" reached number eight on the Brasil Hot 100 Airplay chart, while also peaking at numbers two and four on the Austrian and German singles charts, respectively, in August.

The song entered the US Billboard Hot 100 at position 93 in October 2010 and reached its peak at number 16 in January 2011, which is the best performance of a Romanian release to date. It has since received a platinum certification from the Recording Industry Association of America (RIAA) in the United States, and has registered sales of 2,226,000 copies as of September 2012. "Stereo Love" peaked at number ten on Billboard's Mexico Airplay chart in January 2011, and continued to rise on other American rankings throughout 2011, including on Hot Latin Songs, where the track peaked at number 22 in April.

== Promotion ==
Upon its release in February 2009, "Stereo Love" was accompanied by a music video that has since been removed from YouTube. Another music video was directed by Dragoș Buliga and shot on the island of Mykonos, Greece in June 2009. It was first released on Cat Music's YouTube channel on 6 July 2009, but has since then notably also been uploaded to the platform by other labels such as Spinnin' and Ultra Records. "Stereo Love" is the first Romanian song to have amassed one million views on YouTube. The music video features individual shots of Maya and Jigulina walking through the streets of the island at daytime before finding and hugging each other at the sea at sunset.

For further promotion, Maya and Jigulina gave selected live performances of the song. They performed at the Spanish award show Los Premios 40 Principales 2010, and at Romanian talk show Razii de noapte in May 2011. The two additionally embarked on a tour in 2011, which visited territories such as India and the Americas. Maya eventually also reworked "Stereo Love" into an orchestra show.

== Mia Martina remix ==
"Stereo Love"

Single by Edward Maya and Mia Martina

from the album Devotion
- Released: 7 September 2010
- Length: 4:08
- Label: Ultra

Mia Martina singles chronology
"Stereo Love" (2010)	"Latin Moon" (2011)

Music video
- "Stereo Love" on YouTube

Canadian singer Mia Martina recorded a cover version of "Stereo Love" and released it on her YouTube channel on 15 June 2010. It was later issued for digital download in Canada on 7 September 2010 by Ultra Records―who had previously searched for an artist to record a North American remix of "Stereo Love"—as Martina's debut single. She is credited as a co-lead artist on the song alongside Maya, and went on to include it on her debut studio album Devotion (2011). Tony Lofaro of the Ottawa Citizen called Martina's version an "infectious pop hit".

Directed by Marc André Debruyne in Toronto, Canada, a music video for the remix was uploaded on YouTube on 9 September 2010, depicting Martina in a sailboat at sunset and riding around the town in a chauffeured Mercedes-Benz at night. Ultra Records did not approve of a budget for a music video, but Martina and her management insisted on filming one, using "around 500 dollars" of their own money for it.

Martina's version of "Stereo Love" experienced commercial success in Canada and surpassed the original, peaking at number ten on the Canadian Hot 100 in November 2010. It received a triple platinum certification from Music Canada, and was nominated for "Dance Recording of the Year" at the Juno Awards of 2011, where Martina also gave a live performance of the song. "Stereo Love" also received a nomination at the 2011 MuchMusic Video Awards in the "Most Watched Video of the Year" category.

=== Label disputes ===
Maya was dissatisfied with the release of the remix, claiming on his social media that he did not know Martina and had not approved of her version. He further complained about Ultra Records trying to book her instead of him at an upcoming North American tour. In response to Maya, the label stated that they had legally acquired the rights from Cat Music to remix "Stereo Love". In 2011, Maya and Jigulina parted ways with Cat Music, accusing the label of breach of contract for withholding their royalties and not promoting their version of "Stereo Love", as well as for granting cover licenses for the song without their consent. Cat Music sued Maya and Jigulina for two million euros for their statements.

== Other usage ==
"Stereo Love" was included on the NRJ Music Awards 2010 compilation. It has been further covered by acts such as Dominican bachata band Grupo Extra, and was played at Real Betis football matches in a violin rendition. On 21 July 2023, Indian label T-Series released "Love Stereo Again" by Tiger Shroff and Zahrah S. Khan. The Hindi song is based on "Stereo Love" and further credits Tanishk Bagchi and Shraddha Pandit as authors alongside the original writers. French singers Léa Zelia and Adryano sampled "Stereo Love" in their 2024 single "Plus L'Time (Stereo Love)"; Maya is credited as a co-lead artist. Maya and Jigulina further appeared as co-lead artists on "Me Without You" (2026) by Swedish singer Felicia, which interpolates "Stereo Love" and peaked at number 90 on her native Sverigetopplistan chart.

== Track listings ==
- French CD single
1. "Stereo Love" (Radio Edit) – 3:04
2. "Stereo Love" (Molella Remix Radio Edit) – 2:52
3. "Stereo Love" (Dabo Remix Edit) – 3:02
4. "Stereo Love" (Bonus Clip) – 3:04
- Dutch CD single
1. "Stereo Love" (Radio Edit) – 3:37
2. "Stereo Love" (Original Version) – 4:07
3. "Stereo Love" (Extended Version) – 5:21
- Italian 2009 CD single
1. "Stereo Love" (Molella Remix Radio Edit) – 2:51
2. "Stereo Love" (DaBo Remix Edit) – 3:02
3. "Stereo Love" (Radio Edit) – 3:06
4. "Stereo Love" (Acoustic Version) – 4:37
5. "Stereo Love" (Molella Remix) – 5:03
6. "Stereo Love" (DaBo Remix) – 5:03
7. "Stereo Love" (Extended Mix) – 5:23
- Italian 2010 CD single
1. "Stereo Love" (Radio Edit) – 3:06
2. "Stereo Love" (Extended Mix) – 5:21
3. "Stereo Love" (Paul & Luke Remix) – 6:21
4. "Stereo Love" (Paki & Jaro Remix Extended) – 7:03
5. "Stereo Love" (Molella Remix) – 5:02
6. "Stereo Love" (Gabry Ponte Remix Extended) – 6:36
7. "Stereo Love" (DaBo Remix) – 5:03
- German CD single
1. "Stereo Love" (Original Mix) – 4:09
2. "Stereo Love" (Scotty Remix) – 5:21
- Mia Martina remix digital download
1. "Stereo Love" (Main Mix) – 4:08
- German 12-inch single
1. "Stereo Love" (Extended Mix) – 5:21
2. "Stereo Love" (Radio Edit) – 3:04
3. "Stereo Love" (Mollela Remix) – 5:03
4. "Stereo Love" (Mia Martina Remix) – 5:24
- Other official digital versions (Note: This is a summary of all digital versions of the single that differ from those found on the CD releases.)
1. "Stereo Love" (Spanish Version) – 3:05
2. "Stereo Love" (Massivedrum DJ Fernando Remix) – 6:38
3. "Stereo Love" (Scotty Dub Mix) – 5:18
4. "Stereo Love" (Scotty Edit Mix) – 3:45
5. "Stereo Love" (Gabry Ponte Remix Radio Edit) – 3:28
6. "Stereo Love" (Gabry Ponte Remix) – 6:36
7. "Stereo Love" (Paolo Ortelli vs. Degree Remix) – 6:18
8. "Stereo Love" (Paki & Jaro Radio Edit) – 3:02
9. "Stereo Love" (Paki & Jaro Remix) – 7:03
10. "Stereo Love" (Paul & Luke Remix Edit) – 3:41
11. "Stereo Love" (Dave Ramone Edit) – 3:04
12. "Stereo Love" (Dave Ramone Mix) – 5:32
13. "Stereo Love" (Dave Ramone Dub) – 5:17
14. "Stereo Love" (Digital Dog UK Radio Edit) – 2:36
15. "Stereo Love" (Digital Dog UK Extended Mix) – 5:03
16. "Stereo Love" (Michael Mind Project Remix Radio Edit) – 3:15
17. "Stereo Love" (Michael Mind Project Remix) – 5:21
18. "Stereo Love" (Mia Martina Remix Extended) – 5:24
19. "Stereo Love" (Vibe FM Version) – 4:14
20. "Stereo Love" (Victor Niglio Remix) – 5:24
21. "Stereo Love" (Alcyon X Remix) – 3:37
22. "Stereo Love" (Alcyon X Extended Remix) – 4:20
23. "Stereo Love" (Mert Can Remix) – 2:36
24. "Stereo Love" (Mert Can Extended Remix) – 3:35
25. "Stereo Love" (Stephano Rossi Remix) – 2:43
26. "Stereo Love" (Stephano Rossi Remix Extended) – 3:23
27. "Stereo Love" (Twelve Remix) – 3:29
28. "Stereo Love" (Twelve Extended Remix) – 4:11
29. "Stereo Love" (Timmy Trumpet Remix) – 3:14
30. "Stereo Love" (Dark Rehab Remix) – 3:26
31. "Stereo Love" (Wildstylez Remix) – 3:26
32. "Stereo Love" (Sean Finn Remix) – 3:08
33. "Stereo Love" (Pete Ellement Remix Extended) – 3:13
34. "Stereo Love" (SP3CTRUM Remix) – 3:13
35. "Stereo Love" (Remastered Version) – 5:21
36. "Stereo Love" (Symphony) – 6:12
37. "Stereo Love" (Festival) – 3:55
38. "Stereo Love" (Melodic) – 3:10
39. "Stereo Love" (TikTok) – 3:35
40. "Stereo Love" (Festival Extended) – 4:20
41. "Stereo Love" (Melodic Extended) – 4:37
42. "Stereo Love" (TikTok Extended) – 5:47

== Charts ==
=== Weekly charts ===
2009–2011 weekly chart performance
Chart (2009–2011)	Peak position
Austria (Ö3 Austria Top 40)	2
Belgium (Ultratop 50 Flanders)	7
Belgium (Ultratop 50 Wallonia)	2
Canada Hot 100 (Billboard)	19
Canada Hot 100 (Billboard) Mia Martina remix	10
Canada AC (Billboard)	30
Canada AC (Billboard) Mia Martina remix	14
Canada Hot AC (Billboard) Mia Martina remix	8
Canada CHR/Top 40 (Billboard)	39
Canada CHR/Top 40 (Billboard) Mia Martina remix	7
Canadian Digital Song Sales (Billboard)	20
Canadian Digital Song Sales (Billboard) Mia Martina remix	9
CIS Airplay (TopHit)	2
Czech Republic (Rádio – Top 100)	1
Denmark (Tracklisten)	2
European Hot 100 Singles (Billboard)	3
Euro Digital Song Sales (Billboard)	1
Finland (Suomen virallinen lista)	1
France (SNEP)	1
Germany (GfK)	4
Global Dance Songs (Billboard)	2
Greece Digital Song Sales (Billboard)	2
Hungary (Rádiós Top 40)	8
Hungary (Dance Top 40)	1
Ireland (IRMA)	1
Italy (FIMI)	4
Luxembourg Digital Song Sales (Billboard)	5
Mexico Airplay (Billboard)	10
Mexico Ingles Airplay (Billboard)	2
Netherlands (Dutch Top 40)	1
Netherlands (Single Top 100)	5
Norway (VG-lista)	1
Poland Dance (ZPAV)	2
Portugal Digital Song Sales (Billboard)	1
Romania Airplay (Romanian Top 100)	2
Romania Airplay (Media Forest)	7
Romania TV Airplay (Media Forest)	1
Russia Airplay (TopHit)	2
Scottish Singles Sales (Official Charts)	2
Slovakia Airplay (ČNS IFPI)	1
Spain (Promusicae)	1
Sweden (Sverigetopplistan)	1
Switzerland (Schweizer Hitparade)	2
Switzerland (Media Control Romandy)	1
Ukraine Airplay (TopHit)	6
UK Singles (Official Charts)	4
UK Dance (Official Charts)	1
US Billboard Hot 100	16
US Adult Pop Airplay (Billboard)	35
US Dance Airplay (Billboard)	1
US Hot Latin Songs (Billboard)	22
US Pop Airplay (Billboard)	11
US Rhythmic Airplay (Billboard)	23
US Tropical Airplay (Billboard)	21

2012 weekly chart performance
Chart (2012)	Peak position
CIS Airplay (TopHit)	114
Russia Airplay (TopHit)	108

2013 weekly chart performance
Chart (2013)	Peak position
CIS Airplay (TopHit)	153
Russia Airplay (TopHit)	142

2014 weekly chart performance
Chart (2014)	Peak position
CIS Airplay (TopHit)	139
Russia Airplay (TopHit)	122

2018 weekly chart performance
Chart (2018)	Peak position
Ukraine Airplay (TopHit)	128

2019 weekly chart performance
Chart (2019)	Peak position
Finland Airplay (Radiosoittolista)	90

2020 weekly chart performance
Chart (2020)	Peak position
Finland Airplay (Radiosoittolista)	62

2021 weekly chart performance
Chart (2021)	Peak position
Finland Airplay (Radiosoittolista)	86

2022 weekly chart performance
Chart (2022)	Peak position
Finland Airplay (Radiosoittolista)	75

2023 weekly chart performance
Chart (2023)	Peak position
Moldova Airplay (TopHit)	161
Poland Airplay (OLiS)	56

2024 weekly chart performance
Chart (2024)	Peak position
Estonia Airplay (TopHit)	136
Moldova Airplay (TopHit)	48

2025 weekly chart performance
Chart (2025)	Peak position
Greece International (IFPI)	68
Moldova Airplay (TopHit)	36
Poland Airplay (OLiS)	46
Romania Airplay (TopHit)	148

2026 weekly chart performance
Chart (2026)	Peak position
Finland Airplay (Radiosoittolista)	59
Germany Dance (GfK)	18
Global 200 (Billboard)	192
Greece International (IFPI)	44
Poland Airplay (OLiS)	74

=== Monthly charts ===
2009–2010 monthly chart performance for "Stereo Love"
Chart (2009–2010)	Peak position
Brazil (Brasil Hot 100 Airplay)	8
Brazil (Brasil Hot Pop Songs)	2
CIS Airplay (TopHit)	2
Russia Airplay (TopHit)	2
Ukraine Airplay (TopHit)	13

2025 monthly chart performance for "Stereo Love"
Chart (2025)	Peak position
Moldova Airplay (TopHit)	57

=== Year-end charts ===
2009 year-end chart performance for "Stereo Love"
Chart (2009)	Position
CIS (TopHit)	21
France (SNEP)	15
Netherlands (Dutch Top 40)	24
Netherlands (Single Top 100)	30
Romania (Nielsen Music Control)	13
Romania (Media Forest)	15
Russia Airplay (TopHit)	21
Ukraine Airplay (TopHit)	176

2010 year-end chart performance for "Stereo Love"
Chart (2010)	Position
Austria (Ö3 Austria Top 40)	7
Belgium (Ultratop 50 Flanders)	38
Belgium (Ultratop 50 Wallonia)	7
Brazil (Crowley)	2
Canada (Canadian Hot 100)	55
CIS (TopHit)	37
Denmark (Tracklisten)	10
European Hot 100 Singles (Billboard)	6
France (SNEP)	15
Germany (Official German Charts)	15
Hungary (Rádiós Top 40)	13
Ireland (IRMA)	15
Italy (FIMI)	5
Romania (Media Forest)	95
Russia Airplay (TopHit)	38
Spain (PROMUSICAE)	5
Spain Airplay (PROMUSICAE)	7
Sweden (Sverigetopplistan)	10
Switzerland (Schweizer Hitparade)	7
Ukraine Airplay (TopHit)	89
UK Singles (OCC)	58
US Dance/Mix Show Airplay (Billboard)	1

2011 year-end chart performance for "Stereo Love"
Chart (2011)	Position
Canada (Canadian Hot 100) Mia Martina remix	34
CIS (TopHit)	169
Hungary (Rádiós Top 40)	97
Russia Airplay (TopHit)	152
US Billboard Hot 100	54
US Dance/Mix Show Airplay (Billboard)	44

2012 year-end chart performance for "Stereo Love"
Chart (2012)	Position
Russia Airplay (TopHit)	185

=== Decade-end charts ===
Decade-end chart performance for "Stereo Love"
Chart (2000–2010)	Position
Austria (Ö3 Austria Top 40)	35
Russia Airplay (TopHit)	155

== Certifications ==
Certifications for "Stereo Love"
Region	Certification	Certified units/sales
Belgium (BRMA)	Gold	15,000^{*}
Canada (Music Canada)	2× Platinum	160,000^{*}
Canada (Music Canada) Mia Martina remix	3× Platinum	240,000^{‡}
Denmark (IFPI Danmark)	2× Platinum	180,000^{‡}
Finland (Musiikkituottajat)	Gold	8,809^{*}
France (SNEP)	None	~92.626 (Note: Sales of "Stereo Love" in France as of February 2010. Comprises cca. 55.973 digital downloads and cca. 36.653 physical copies.)
Germany (BVMI)	2× Platinum	600,000^{‡}
Italy (FIMI)	2× Platinum	60,000^{*}
New Zealand (RMNZ)	Platinum	30,000^{‡}
Norway (IFPI Norway)	8× Platinum	80,000^{‡}
Spain (Promusicae) Molella Remix Radio Edit	2× Platinum	80,000^{*}
Spain (Promusicae)	Platinum	60,000^{‡}
Sweden (GLF)	7× Platinum	280,000^{‡}
Switzerland (IFPI Switzerland)	Platinum	30,000^{^}
United Kingdom (BPI)	2× Platinum	1,200,000^{‡}
United States (RIAA)	Platinum	1,000,000^{‡} / 2,226,000
Streaming
Greece (IFPI Greece)	2× Platinum	4,000,000^{†}
^{*} Sales figures based on certification alone.^{^} Shipments figures based on certification alone.^{‡} Sales+streaming figures based on certification alone.^{†} Streaming-only figures based on certification alone.

== Release history ==
Release dates for "Stereo Love"
Region	Date	Format	Version	Label	Ref.
Romania	23 February 2009	Radio airplay	Original	Unknown	
Various	6 July 2009	Digital download	Original	Cat	
France	19 October 2009	Digital download	Original	Play On	
France	November 2009	CD single	Original	Play On	
Netherlands	2009	CD single	Original	Spinnin'	
Italy	2009	CD single	Original	Do It Yourself	
Italy	2010	CD single	Original	Do It Yourself	
Germany	7 May 2010	CD single	Original	B1; Universal	
Germany	15 April 2024	12-inch single	Original	Dance on the Beat	
United Kingdom	2010	CD single	Original	All Around the World	
Canada	7 September 2010	Digital download	Mia Martina remix	Ultra	
Canada	Unknown		Original	Ultra	
United States	Unknown		Original	Ultra	

== See also ==
- List of music released by Romanian artists that has charted in major music markets
- List of music released by Moldovan artists that has charted in major music markets
- List of number-one songs of the 2010s (Czech Republic)
- List of number-one singles of 2010 (Finland)
- List of number-one hits of 2009 (France)
- List of number-one singles of 2010 (France)
- List of number-one singles of 2010 (Ireland)
- List of Dutch Top 40 number-one singles of 2009
- List of number-one songs in Norway
- List of Media Forest most-broadcast songs of 2009 in Romania
- List of number-one songs of the 2010s (Slovakia)
- List of number-one singles of 2010 (Spain)
- List of number-one singles and albums in Sweden
- List of UK Dance Singles Chart number ones of 2010
- List of number-one dance airplay hits of 2010 (U.S.)
