= Desert Rain (song) =

Single by Edward Maya featuring Vika Jigulina
- Released: November 2010
- Length: 4:05
- Label: Play on, Sony-BMG
- Songwriters: Eduard Marian Ilie, Victoria Corneva

Edward Maya singles chronology
"Stereo Love" (2010)	"Desert Rain" (2010)	"Mono in Love" (2012)

Vika Jigulina singles chronology
"This Is My Life" (2010)	"Desert Rain" (2011)	"Memories" (2012)

"Desert Rain" is the third single by Romanian musician and producer Edward Maya following his international hit "Stereo Love" and "This Is My Life". The music is adapted from a traditional Romanian folk song titled 'Sârbă ciobănească'.

== Music video ==
The official music video for was uploaded to YouTube on 28 December 2010.

=== Synopsis ===
The video depicts Edward in a house in the desert, and Vika on the other side covered in flowers. They miss each other and eventually they break their walls and meet for the first time.

== Track listing ==
No.	Title	Length
1.	"Desert Rain"	4:05

== Charts ==
=== Weekly charts ===
Weekly chart performance for "Desert Rain"
Chart (2011)	Peak position
CIS Airplay (TopHit)	4
Czech Republic Airplay (ČNS IFPI)	8
Romania (Romanian Top 100)	46
Russia Airplay (TopHit)	1
Slovakia Airplay (ČNS IFPI)	52
Ukraine Airplay (TopHit)	24

=== Year-end charts ===
Year-end chart performance for "Desert Rain"
Chart (2011)	Position
Russia Airplay (TopHit)	44
Ukraine Airplay (TopHit)	104
