= Mono in Love =

Single by Edward Maya featuring Vika Jigulina

from the album The Stereo Love Show
- Released: 21 June 2012
- Genre: Dance
- Length: 3:17; 5:36 (extended version)
- Label: Cat Music; Ultra Records
- Songwriter: Edward Maya

Edward Maya featuring Vika Jigulina singles chronology
"Desert Rain" (2011)	"Mono in Love" (2012)	"Feeling" (2013)

"Mono in Love" is a song by Romanian singers Edward Maya and Vika Jigulina. It was released as a single on 2012 and as a digital download EP on 9 July 2013. Unlike Edward's previous singles, "Mono in Love" did not chart.

== Track listing ==
- Digital single
1. Mono in Love (Radio Edit) – 3:19
2. Mono in Love – 5:36 (feat. Vika Jigulina)
- Digital EP
1. Mono in Love (Radio Edit) – 3:17
2. Mono in Love (Extended Mix) – 4:17
3. Mono in Love (Instrumental) – 3:22
4. Mono in Love (Dub Version) – 3:22
5. Mono in Love (Radio Edit) – 3:17 (feat. Vika Jigulina)
6. Mono in Love – 5:36 (feat. Vika Jigulina)
