= Bad Romance =

2009 single by Lady Gaga

Single by Lady Gaga

from the EP The Fame Monster
- B-side: "Paparazzi (DJ dan club remix)"
- Released: October 19, 2009
- Recorded: 2009
- Studio: Record Plant (Hollywood); FC Walvisch (Amsterdam)
- Genre: Electropop; dance-pop; dark pop
- Length: 4:54 (album version); 4:21 (radio edit); 4:00 (short radio edit)
- Label: Streamline; KonLive; Cherrytree; Interscope
- Songwriters: RedOne; Lady Gaga
- Producer: RedOne

Lady Gaga singles chronology
"Paparazzi" (2009)	"Bad Romance" (2009)	"Video Phone" (2009)

Music video
- "Bad Romance" on YouTube

"Bad Romance" is a song by American singer-songwriter Lady Gaga from her third extended play (EP), The Fame Monster (2009)—the reissue of her debut studio album, The Fame (2008). Following an unauthorized demo leak, Gaga premiered the final version of the song during Alexander McQueen's 2010 Paris Fashion Week show in October 2009. Written and co-produced by Gaga alongside Moroccan-Swedish record producer RedOne, "Bad Romance" was released as the lead single from The Fame Monster on October 19, 2009. Musically, it is an electropop, dance-pop and dark pop track with a spoken bridge and a hook featuring nonsense syllables. Inspired by German house and techno music, the song was developed as an experimental pop record. Lyrically, Gaga drew from the paranoia she experienced while on tour and wrote about her attraction to unhealthy romantic relationships.

"Bad Romance" received widespread acclaim from music critics, who praised its chorus, beat and hook. Commercially, the song was a global success, topping the record charts in more than 20 countries. It peaked at number two on the US Billboard Hot 100 and was certified eleven-times Platinum by the Recording Industry Association of America (RIAA), having sold 5.9 million digital downloads as of 2019. "Bad Romance" has sold 12 million copies worldwide, becoming one of the best-selling digital singles of all time. The song won a Grammy Award for Best Female Pop Vocal Performance, and was included in annual "best-of" lists of Rolling Stone and Pitchfork; the former named it one of the 100 Greatest Songs of the 21st Century and 500 Greatest Songs of All Time. In a 2017 journal, which studied structural patterns in melodies of earworm songs, the American Psychological Association (APA) called "Bad Romance" one of the world's catchiest.

The accompanying music video for "Bad Romance", directed by Francis Lawrence, features Gaga inside a surreal white bathhouse where she is kidnapped and drugged by supermodels who sell her to the Russian mafia for sexual slavery. It ends as Gaga immolates the man who bought her. The video garnered acclaim from critics for its fashion, choreography, costumes and symbolism. Briefly becoming the most-viewed YouTube video in 2010, it received a record ten nominations at the MTV Video Music Awards, winning seven, including Video of the Year. It received the Grammy Award for Best Music Video and was named the best music video of the 21st century by Billboard. Gaga has performed "Bad Romance" at television shows, award ceremonies, her concert tours and residency shows, and the Super Bowl LI halftime show.

== Background and release ==
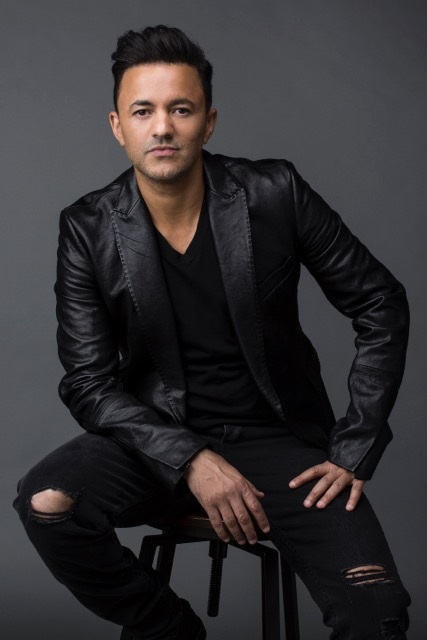
RedOne (pictured in 2017) co-wrote and co-produced the song with Gaga.

Lady Gaga and RedOne wrote and arranged "Bad Romance"; they were also responsible for background vocals. RedOne solely handled instrumentation, programming and recording, and also served as the main producer, with Gaga co-producing with him. He worked with Johny Severin on vocal editing, and Dave Russell and Eelco Bakker on audio engineering. The song was mixed by Spike Stent and mastered by Gene Grimaldi. "Bad Romance" was recorded at the Record Plant in Los Angeles and FC Walvisch in Amsterdam.

Before its official release, a demo version was published illegally on the internet on October 2, 2009, prompting Gaga to comment via Twitter that it "is makin[g] my ears bleed. Wait till you hear the real version." Gaga performed a snippet of "Bad Romance" on Saturday Night Live on October 3, 2009, along with "Poker Face" and "LoveGame". The song's final version premiered during the finale of Alexander McQueen's 2010 Paris Fashion Week show titled Plato's Atlantis, which was his last work before his death a few months later. On October 19, "Bad Romance" was released as the lead single from the extended play (EP) The Fame Monster (2009), the reissue of Gaga's debut studio album, The Fame (2008).

"Bad Romance" was one of the songs Gaga wrote in 2009 while touring. These songs were about the various abstract "monsters"—metaphors for her paranoias—she faced during the tour. Gaga explained that she generally felt lonely in her relationships and was attracted to unhealthy romances, which became the song's themes. Gaga wrote the lyrics in Norway on her tour bus. She elaborated on the writing process in an interview with Grazia:

I was in Russia, then Germany, and spent a lot of time in Eastern Europe. There is this amazing German house-techno music, so I wanted to make a pop experimental record. I kind of wanted to leave the '80s a little bit, so the chorus is a '90s melody, which is what the inspiration was. There was certainly some whisky involved in the writing of the record. It's about being in love with your best friend.

== Music and lyrics ==
"Bad Romance"
A 30-second sample of the song where Gaga sings the latter part of the chorus leading up to the hook in the refrain

"Bad Romance" combines house and techno influences with new wave synths, and has been described as an electropop, dance-pop and dark pop song. Sociologist Mathieu Deflem recognized rock influences in the song, while BBC critic Paul Lester noted the rave-inspired synthesizer sounds. Musicnotes published this song in common time with a tempo of 119 beats per minute in the key of A minor. Gaga's vocal range spans from the low note of E_{3} to the high note of C_{5}. The song follows in the chord progression Am–C–F–Am-C–G in the verses and F–G–Am–C–F–G–E–Am in the chorus.

Describing Gaga's voice in "Bad Romance", Deflem wrote that it is "at times raw and raspy, not soft and smooth, and incorporates the contrast of gentle and harsh vocal styles, alternating singing softly with screaming loudly". The song opens as Gaga sings a portion of the chorus, then transitions into the "Rah-rah—ah-ah-ah, Roma-roma-ma, Gaga-ooh-la-la" hook, which she says is an abbreviation of the word "romance". The song then incorporates keyboard sounds. They are followed by the first verse and the pre-chorus as Gaga voices the lines, "You know that I want you / And you know that I need you". The "full-throated" chorus follows where she sings, "You and me could write a bad romance ... / Caught in a bad romance."

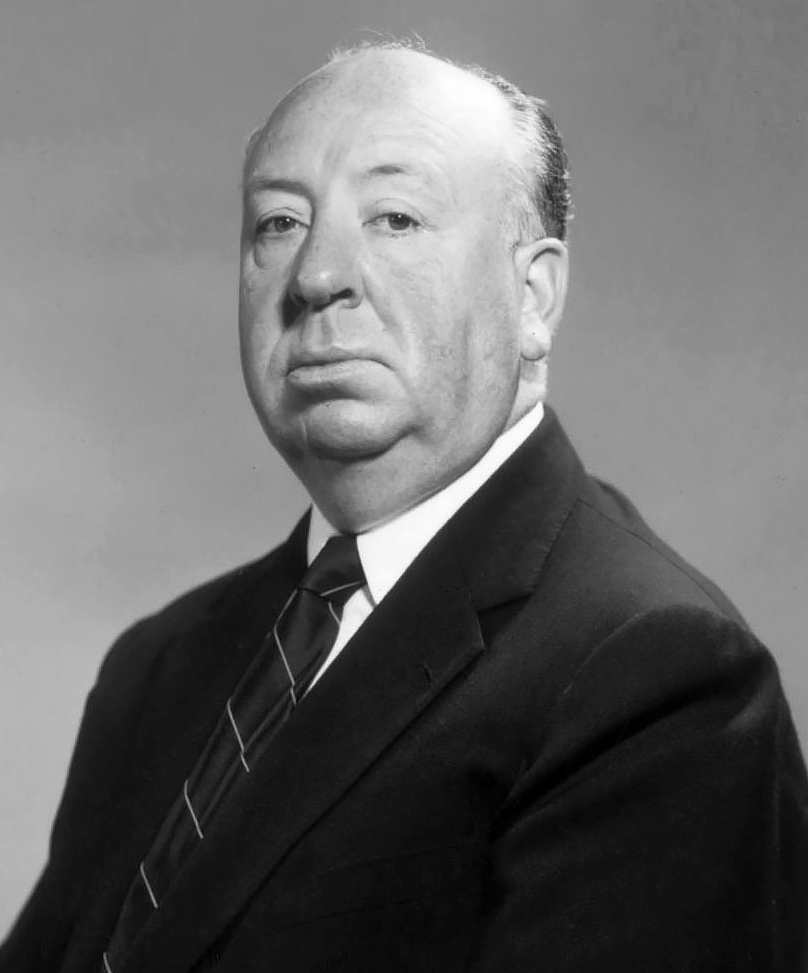
In the lyrics, Gaga mentions three films by director Alfred Hitchcock (pictured).

Critics noted the influence of other songs and artists on "Bad Romance". Sal Cinquemani of Slant Magazine noticed influences from 1980s music. Simon Price from The Independent and Daniel Brockman of The Phoenix compared the song to works of the groups Boney M. and Depeche Mode, respectively. In the verse, "I want your psycho, your vertigo shtick, Want you in my Rear Window, Baby, you're sick", Gaga is listing Alfred Hitchcock films. She said, "What I'm really trying to say is I want the deepest, darkest, sickest parts of you that you are afraid to share with anyone because I love you that much." Price stated that the line "I want your ugly, I want your disease" established the grim tone of The Fame Monster.

The lyrics address a bad relationship; the Boston Public Health Commission included "Bad Romance" in its "Top 10 List of Songs with Unhealthy Relationship Ingredients". For Brockman, the song is a declaration of "liberation from a significant other". Explaining its title, author Robin James in the book Resilience & Melancholy: Pop Music, Feminism, Neoliberalism wrote that it does not romanticize "bad" things but is only "pointing out the badness of conventionally-scripted pop song 'romance' itself".

Katrin Horn, a postdoctoral fellow in American studies, found that "Bad Romance" works on two levels. As gay and lesbian youth account for a large proportion of Gaga's fans, the line "I don't wanna be friends"—which explores the issue of falling in love with one's heterosexual best friend—resonates with them. On the other hand, the song thematizes Gaga's "bad romance" with fame and fortune. Horn interpreted the part "all your lovers' revenge" as Gaga referencing her fans' previous idols, and in the line "I want your love", she is seeking applause from her fans when performing live.

== Critical reception ==
"Bad Romance" received widespread critical acclaim. It was named the best song on The Fame Monster by Maureen Lee Lanker of Entertainment Weekly. It was included in lists of best songs of 2009 by Pitchfork (which called it "epic in construction"), MTV News, and Rolling Stone. Calling it one of the "most memorable pop singles" of the late 2000s, NME credits the song with establishing Gaga as an icon. In his review of the album, Scott Plagenhoef of Pitchfork found it "arguably the best pop single" of 2009.

"Bad Romance" was praised for its chorus, beat, and hook. Kaufman lauded the drastic transition into a bombastic beat during the chorus, which was called catchy by Rolling Stone's Jody Rosen, one of Gaga's best by MusicOMH's Michael Hubbard, and "so wonderfully big it dwarfs the industry of a million angry dudes with guitars" by NME's Emily Mackay. Christopher John Farley from The Wall Street Journal praised the "Jabberwockian" catchiness of the hook. Other reviewers commented on the song's sex appeal, praised it for making Gaga's name a "Teutonic chant", and called it a "turbocharged Euro-soul" and a club-friendly tune that possessed a "sordid underbelly".

"Bad Romance" was compared to Gaga's previous singles (including "Just Dance" and "Poker Face") by reviewers with the criticism that it was not on par with them and it lacked their instant catch. Critics compared Gaga to other artists. Kitty Empire of The Guardian wrote "Bad Romance" made "this driven, uncharismatic Italian-American being [Gaga] the new Madonna", and Spin's Josh Modell thought that with its "earworm nonsense lyric ('[r]a-ra-a-a-a, ra-ma, uh-uh-ah!')", the song "plays like the best Madonna song in ages". Jon Blistein from L Magazine believed it is an amalgamation of a Cher song, "faux-European accented verse", and "bland spoken-word bridge".

== Chart performance ==
In the US, "Bad Romance" debuted at number nine on the Billboard Hot 100 on November 14, 2009, with 143,000 digital downloads. After two weeks, the song reached number two, holding the spot for seven non-consecutive weeks. It was barred from the top position by Jay-Z's "Empire State of Mind" (featuring Alicia Keys) and later Kesha's "Tik Tok" (both 2009). The movement to number two was first prompted by a 49% digital gain, which led to the song's top spot on the Hot Digital Songs chart. As of February 2019, "Bad Romance" has sold 5.9 million copies in the US, according to Nielsen Soundscan, making Gaga the second artist after Katy Perry to have three singles—along with "Just Dance" and "Poker Face"—each selling five million digital copies. After the Recording Industry Association of America (RIAA) started including video streams in their tabulation of single certifications, "Bad Romance" was certified 11× platinum for 11 million in sales and streaming. According to Nielsen Broadcast Data Systems, it briefly set the record for most weekly plays in the 17-year history of the Pop Songs chart, registering 10,859 plays from 130 radio stations monitored for the chart. Following Gaga's Super Bowl LI halftime show performance in 2017, "Bad Romance" re-entered the Hot 100 at number 50 and the Digital Song Sales chart at number 9. On the Canadian Hot 100, "Bad Romance" debuted at number 58 and reached number one the following week. Replaced by "Tik Tok" for two weeks, "Bad Romance" returned to the top spot on the chart. Music Canada certified "Bad Romance" Diamond, denoting sales of 800,000 copies.

On the European Hot 100 Singles chart, "Bad Romance" spent two weeks at number one. It topped the charts in Austria, Denmark, Finland, Germany, Greece, Ireland, Sweden, and Norway. In the UK, "Bad Romance" debuted at number 14 on the UK Singles Chart. In December 2009, the song reached the top spot with 72,919 copies sold, making Gaga the first female artist to have three number-one singles in one year. (Note: Gaga previously reached the top position with her singles "Just Dance" and "Poker Face" in 2009.) It attained multi-platinum certification by the British Phonographic Industry (BPI). According to the British company Phonographic Performance Limited, the song was the UK's most played in 2010. As of February 2025, "Bad Romance" has sold 2.2 million copies with 145 million streams, making it Gaga's third best selling single in the UK.

"Bad Romance" debuted at number 16 on the ARIA Singles Chart in Australia and at number 33 on the RIANZ Singles Chart in New Zealand before peaking at number two in both countries. The song was certified eleven times platinum by the Australian Recording Industry Association for shipment of 770,000 copies. The song sold 9.7 million copies worldwide in 2010—making it the second best-selling of the year—and 12 million as of 2018, becoming one of the best-selling singles of all time.

== Music video ==
=== Development ===
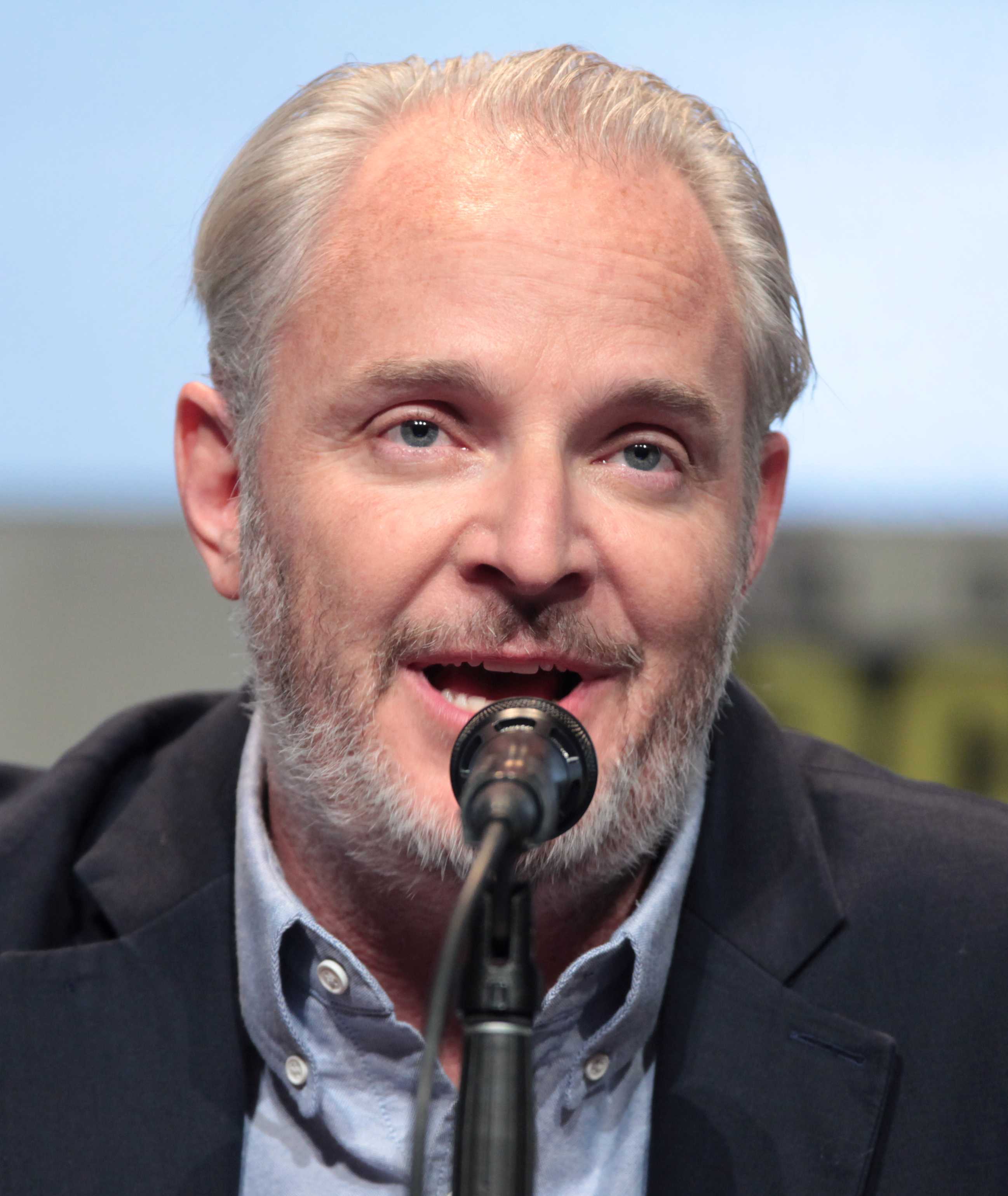
Francis Lawrence (pictured in 2015) directed the music video.

In an interview with Rolling Stone, Gaga confirmed Francis Lawrence as the director of the music video and said that she was impressed with the final version. She explained, "I knew [Lawrence's] ability as a director is so much higher than what I could [do]." Her creative team, Haus of Gaga, managed the art direction, and the final video premiered on November 10, 2009. Gaga described her experience of working with Lawrence:

I wanted somebody with a tremendous understanding of how to make a pop video, because my biggest challenge working with directors is that I am the director and I write the treatments and I get the fashion and I decide what it's about, and it's very hard to find directors that will relinquish any sort of input from the artist ... But Francis and I worked together ... It was collaborative. He's a really pop video director and a filmmaker ... I knew he could execute the video in a way that I could give him all my weirdest, most psychotic ideas ... But it would come across to and be relevant to the public.

Gaga and Lawrence developed the music video's concept. It was initially planned to be shot in New York City with more elaborate sets and outdoor spaces. Owing to the low budget and a lack of product placement, this idea was scrapped. Because of Gaga's schedule, it was shot in Los Angeles over a two-day period. Lawrence was impressed with Gaga's work ethic and creativity during the video shoot; he praised her teamwork, punctuality, and spontaneity.

=== Synopsis ===
The video's choreography drew comparisons to that of Michael Jackson's Thriller. The white latex suits in the video were inspired by the wolf costume from the film Where the Wild Things Are.

The video's main idea is that Gaga gets kidnapped by supermodels who drug her and sell her to the Russian mafia for a million rubles. It takes place in a fluorescent white bathhouse. The video begins as Gaga, wearing razor-blade glasses, sits on a white throne in a brightly lit white room while Johann Sebastian Bach's fugue BWV 869 (from The Well-Tempered Clavier Book 2) is playing in the background. As she plays "Bad Romance" on an iPod speaker, a dimly lit bathhouse is shown, which has a sign reading "Bath Haus of GaGa" on its walls. As the song's first hook begins, Gaga and other women in latex suits crawl out of white, coffin-like pods and begin dancing. A pastiche of ensuing scenes alternates between Gaga singing to herself in front of a mirror and lying in a bathtub.

During the chorus, two women pull Gaga out of the bathtub, rip her top clothing off, and force her to drink a glass of vodka. As the second verse begins, Gaga, wearing a diamond-covered outfit and crown, seductively dances for men bidding for her. She performs a lap dance for one of them (played by Slovenian model Jurij Bradač), who becomes her highest bidder. When the chorus plays for the third time, Gaga is shown wearing a faux-polar bear hide jacket and walking toward the man, who is sitting on a bed and unbuttoning his shirt. Looking indifferent, she removes her jacket and sunglasses. The bed spontaneously combusts while he is still on it, and Gaga sings sinisterly in front of the flames. The video ends as she lies beside a smoldering skeleton on top of the destroyed bed covered in ashes. With soot smeared across her body, she calmly smokes a cigarette as her pyrotechnic bra activates.

=== Reception ===
The video received general acclaim for its fashion, choreography, futuristic set-pieces, and costumes. (Note: Attributed to multiple references:) Gaga, described by Christopher John Farley of The Wall Street Journal as "one of the few pop stars of the present time who really understood spectacle, fashion, shock, choreography" like Madonna and Michael Jackson in the 1980s, was particularly praised by Jennifer Cady of E! for revitalizing performance art and putting thoughts and care into her products; Todd Martens of the Los Angeles Times expressed similar sentiments, believing the video to be "worthy of a feature-length film". Critics positively commented on her looks, as they found her minimal use of make-up and the appearance of a "stripped down" and "real" Gaga refreshing.

Media outlets noted the music video was reminiscent of the film Blade Runner (1982), Anubis Airlines from the television series True Blood (2008–2014), the works of filmmaker Stanley Kubrick, and Michael Jackson's Thriller. The comparison to the lattermost was made due to the scene with the coffin pods, "twitchy [...] dance moves", and zombie-like arm movements. Farley thought the video's shock art resembled Jackson's work during the 1980s. For Evan Sawdey of PopMatters it remained unclear whether Gaga deliberately paid homage to Thriller or used this as another excuse to wear "the mostweirdass [sic] outfits ever designed by mankind".

=== Thematic analysis ===
Gaga said that the human trafficking in the video is a metaphor for the music industry's treatment of women as a "commodity". In the book Lady Gaga: Behind the Fame, Emily Herbert drew comparisons between the underlying theme of the video and the theme of The Fame Monster—Gaga's relationship with fame. Herbert wrote, "Was this the price that Gaga had to pay for the fame she so desired? Did she feel as if she'd had to prostitute herself in some way? The themes were all based around sex, decadence, and corruption; alcohol and even cigarettes, twenty-first century society's biggest no-no, were present, and so by implication ... drugs."

Jocelyn Vena from MTV News and Troy Peterson of Slate believed that the video was symbolic. As it begins with Gaga around people representing her characters from The Fame videos, she is immediately kidnapped, drugged and changed into "the super-sexy, somewhat spooky Fame Monster version". Vena interpreted this as Gaga reinventing her image and being someone who likes to "push the boundaries and explor[e] all manner of sexual proclivities". She felt that the video was a testament to Gaga's brilliance as an artist who uses her videos to visualize the start of her career's next phase. Peterson found religious symbolism in the video. He believed, for example, that the scenes with Gaga in the bathtub represented baptism and the women with martini were performing communion.

The video's style, fashion and items were subject to analysis. The pair of razor-blade sunglasses that Gaga wore portrayed tough female spirit; she explained, "It's meant to be, 'This is my shield, this is my weapon, this is my inner sense of fame, this is my monster." Author Robin James found Gaga's style in the video to be heavily inspired by goth fashion and aesthetics, including the Victorian-esque furniture and razor-blade eyeglasses. By visualizing "goth monstrosity", Gaga showcases sexual norms and identities to display the struggle she overcomes. For example, the words "Bath Haus of GaGa" in the video allude to English goth band Bauhaus, and her nude scene highlights her thin body's "grotesqueness" and vertebrae, which look like the ridges on a reptile's back. James associated the "disgusting, distorted, monstrous bodies and movements" with the sexism Gaga faces. She described the video as Gaga's "conquest of the male gaze, the traffic in women and rape culture", which she felt was highlighted in Gaga's "insect" suit with Alexander McQueen's 12-inch (300 mm) armadillo heels resembling lobster-claws—a reference to a female mantis who cannibalizes her male partner after copulation. Mass media theorist Paul Hegarty saw Gaga's use of the heels as a combination of dominance and submission: their height restricts her movement, indicating submissiveness, but her ability to walk in them signifies a subversive dominance. In this way, the video "looks at complicity with controls as a way of surmounting them".

Critics analyzed the ending scene, in which Gaga defeats the villain. Gaga kills her captor using a sparkling, pyrotechnic bra after having had sex with him. According to Mathieu Deflem, the bra represents Gaga's thoughts on society perceiving female breasts as a "weapon" when they are simply part of a woman's body. Author Annette Lynch found the bra a symbol for empowerment, writing that Gaga uses her sexuality to defeat the villain. During this scene, Gaga is seen calmly smoking a cigarette, which to Gilad Padva in the Journal of LGBT Youth indicated that she liked the sexual encounter with her captor, who dies after being exploited by a "voracious" Gaga—an "unruly woman" (Note: The author cites Kathleen Rowe's Unruly Woman: Gender and Genres of Laughter to define an "unruly woman" as someone who refuses to adhere to her "proper place", assertively expresses her desire and is hated for her independent nature.) prioritizing her own satisfaction over attempting to please her male partner. Padva found that this comically reversed "hegemonic [hetro]sexuality", where the submissive and exploited is now dominating and exploiting. In the book The Performance Identities of Lady Gaga: Critical Essays, Jennifer M. Santos believed by overpowering her captor, Gaga redefined gender roles and subverted male fantasies of "fetishistic scopophilia" and "sadistic voyeurism" as evident in the scene where Gaga is forced to strip almost naked and dance for her buyers.

== Accolades and impact ==
In 2011, "Bad Romance" won the Grammy Award for Best Female Pop Vocal Performance. In 2015, Billboard called the song "the Biggest Hot 100 Hit to Peak at No. 2", describing it as a "modern classic". A 2017 journal published by Psychology of Aesthetics, Creativity, and the Arts studying structural patterns in the melodies of earworm songs compiled lists of catchiest tracks from 3,000 participants, in which "Bad Romance" ranked number one. In 2018 and 2021, Rolling Stone named "Bad Romance" one of the 100 Greatest Songs of the 21st-century and 500 Greatest Songs of All Time, respectively. Billboard listed it as one of the 100 Best Karaoke Songs of All Time in 2022 and 500 Best Pop Songs of All Time in 2023.

"If there's one song that defines Lady Gaga, it's this one. A highly successful blend of pop and synth maximalism, 'Bad Romance' was a tour de force by all accounts: brilliant lyrics; a shimmery, fashion-forward music video; record-breaking sales; and Lady Gaga's singular voice at its most guttural and raw."

— Britt Julious, Elle (2019)

A writer for the Official Charts Company wrote that the song "indisputably turned Gaga from a pop girl of the moment into an undeniable superstar [...] A strange and malformed pop song, 'Bad Romance' was the ultimate vessel for Gaga's unlimited and unbridled ambition." Media outlets Rolling Stone, Billboard, The Guardian, The Independent, Vulture, Uproxx and Glamour ranked "Bad Romance" as Gaga's best song. (Note: Attributed to multiple references:) For Vulture, it defined the late 2000s and "completed her transformation into a truly fearless, all-encompassing artist". Rolling Stone believed the song epitomized the "essence of Gagaism" (Note: Described as "a relentlessly catchy chorus and a pummeling club beat power a song that's grand and tawdry and joyful and melancholy") and Billboard opined it captured "her grandiose aesthetic, daring songwriting, lyrical flourishes and dramatic vocal flair". According to Uproxx, the song had elements that influenced Gaga's later work—"pure pop melodies, nods to her love for '80s and '90s dance, pop culture references [...] a radio-friendly chorus that sticks on the charts like honey, and a hefty dose of 'WTF' weirdness that keeps the singer in her own lane". Author Constantine Chatzipapatheodoridis cited "Bad Romance" as one of the signature songs on The Fame Monster, in which Gaga immersed in "her stylized profile of the 'mad artist'", who challenged traditional gender norms and sexuality.

In May 2010, "Bad Romance" became the first video to reach 200 million views on YouTube, briefly becoming the most-viewed video there. In January 2019, the video reached 1 billion views. It received 10 nominations at the 2010 MTV Video Music Awards, including Best Art Direction, Best Special Effects and Best Cinematography, winning Video of the Year, Best Female Video, Best Pop Video, Best Dance Video, Best Direction, Best Editing and Best Choreography. It tied with Peter Gabriel's "Sledgehammer" for the record of most nominations for a single video in the history of the MTV Video Music Award. "Bad Romance" received the Grammy Award for Best Short Form Music Video. Time magazine included "Bad Romance" on its list of best music videos since the 1980s. Its author Claire Suddath said that even if Gaga's subsequent videos were more elaborate, "Bad Romance" was Gaga at her best.

Writing about the impact of Gaga's 2011 song "Born This Way" in the 2010s, Stephen Daw of Billboard called the "Bad Romance" music video a "culture-breaking moment". In 2011, it was voted the best video of the 2000s by readers of Billboard, narrowly beating Britney Spears's "Toxic". The magazine ranked it first in its list of 100 greatest music videos of the 21st century and credited it with establishing Gaga's fan base, known as Little Monsters. "It offered a glimpse into an entire cinematic world that thrilled and disturbed in equal measure, expanding the possibilities of what a music video could achieve — and challenging other stars to step their game up at the same time", wrote Billboard in its listing. "With 'Bad Romance,' she took the old standard for great music videos and set it aflame, then got to work building a new one." In 2021, Rolling Stone Australia listed it as one of the 100 greatest music videos of all time.

== Live performances ==
Gaga first performed "Bad Romance" on Saturday Night Live in October 2009. She wore an outfit called "The Orb". She performed it on the television show Gossip Girl in the episode "The Last Days of Disco Stick", where she wore a 35-foot (11 m) long dress. In an interview with MTV, Gaga explained that she did not want the performance to be out of tune with the show's storyline, so she worked with the scriptwriters to incorporate it into the plot. Occurring at a private party arranged by the character Blair Waldorf, the episode features Gaga as she emerges from two giant doors and climbs up a ladder, which symbolizes bad luck.

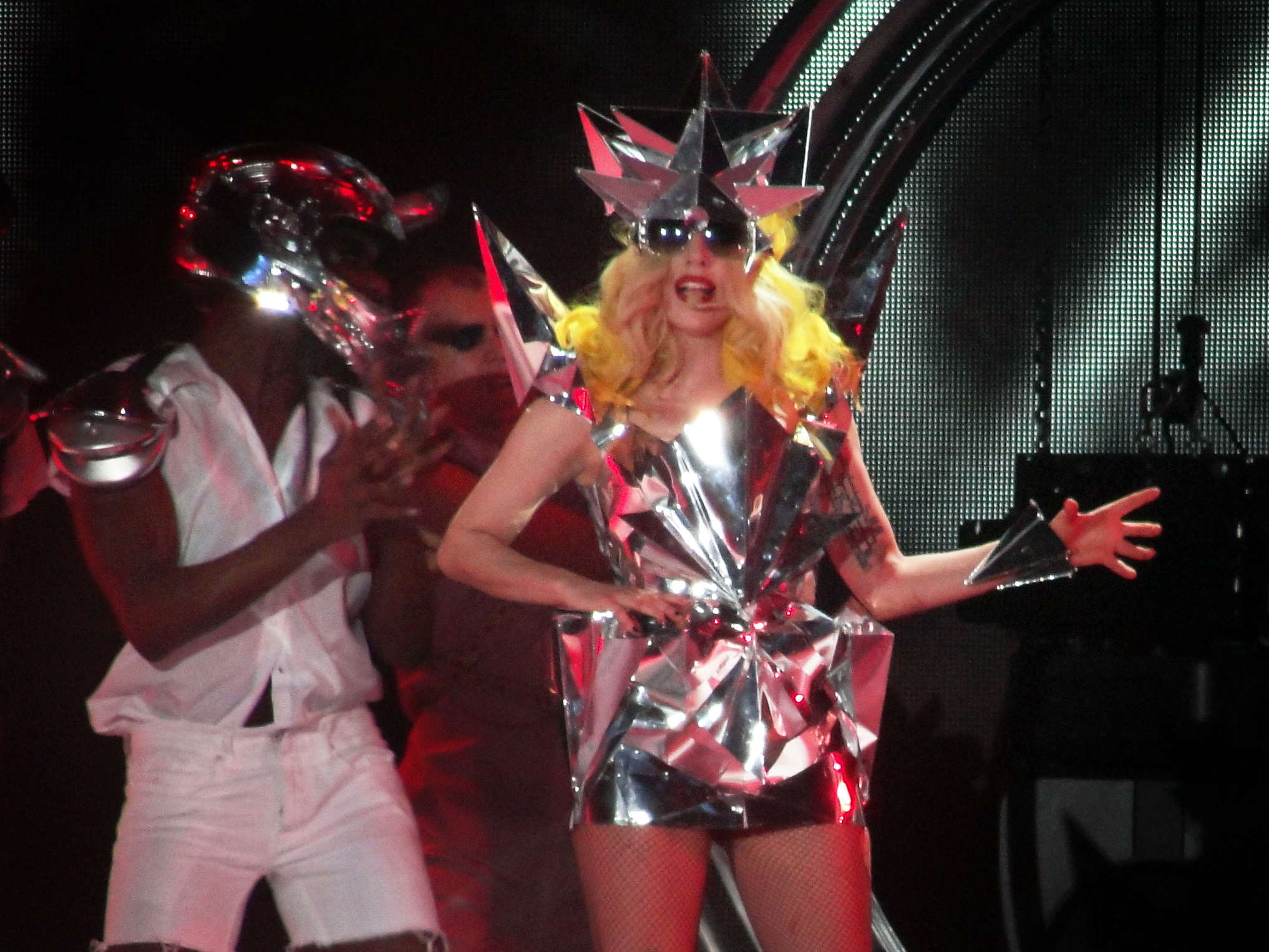
Gaga performing the song during the revamped Monster Ball Tour in a mirrored dress and headpiece (2010)

Gaga performed "Bad Romance" at the 2009 American Music Awards. She was dressed in a flesh-colored bodysuit wrapped with white piping and embedded with flashing lights, imitating rib cage and a spine. During her performance, she broke open a glass door with the microphone stand. Gaga sang the song on television shows, including The Jay Leno Show in November 2009, The Ellen DeGeneres Show in November 2009, The X Factor in December 2009, The Oprah Winfrey Show in January 2010, and Today in July 2010. In May 2011, she performed it at Radio 1's Big Weekend in Carlisle, Cumbria and Good Morning America. For the latter, she entered the stage flying on a harness as steam billowed from center-stage. As the song started, she changed to red fishnet stockings with black felt pieces, a red leotard and black lace boots. Katie Kindelan of ABC News commented on Gaga's "trademark outrageous fashion".

"Bad Romance" was the last song in the set list of Gaga's worldwide concert series, The Monster Ball Tour (2009–2011). On the early version of the show, she wore a 1980s-inspired white power suit with high shoulders and high-waisted pants. In the revamped 2010–2011 shows of the tour, she appeared on stage inside a gyroscope while wearing a mirrored dress and headpiece. Remarking on Gaga's "tremendous ambition and passion for her fans", Diana Benati of The Riverfront Times wrote, "Few people on this little blue marble have the ability or the opportunity to affect so many people on a daily basis. She stole [...] hearts". Gaga emerged from an egg for the performance of "Bad Romance" at the Born This Way Ball (2012–2013). Miguel Dumaual of ABS-CBNnews.com felt Gaga's performance "suffers from a little too much auto-dancing, -singing, and all-around hip gyrating". Gaga also performed the track on her 2014 ArtRave: The Artpop Ball tour in a rave-inspired outfit. The same year, she sang a country version of "Bad Romance" at South by Southwest, and strapped on a rose-covered keytar while performing the song at her residency show, Lady Gaga Live at Roseland Ballroom.

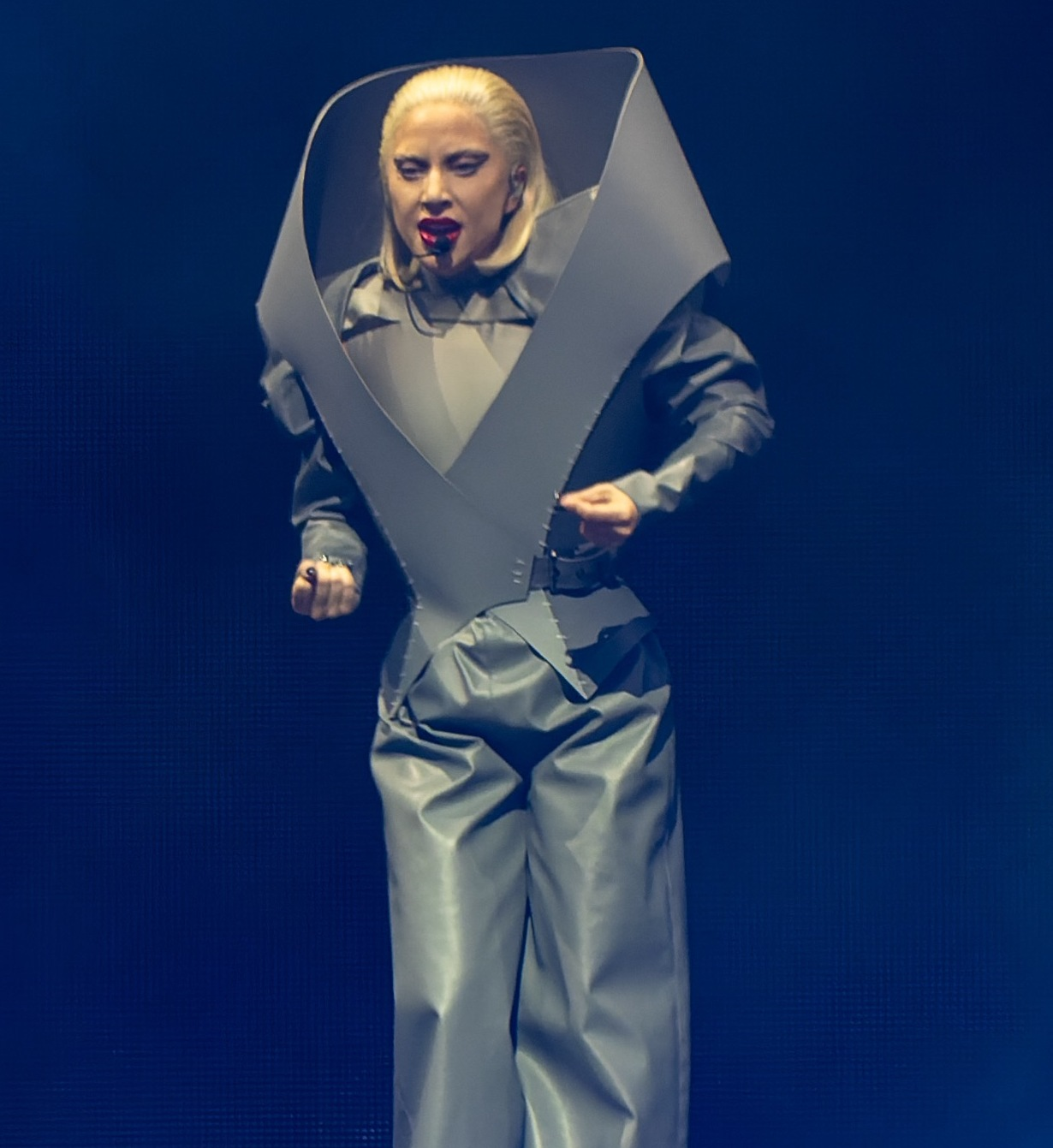
Gaga singing "Bad Romance" as the opening number of 2022's The Chromatica Ball, a choice Nick Lavine of NME considered "daring".

In July 2016, Gaga performed it in a piano medley along with "You and I" and the Beatles' "Come Together" at a concert at the BB&T Pavilion in Camden, New Jersey, which was part of the 2016 Democratic National Convention. In November 2016, she appeared in the Carpool Karaoke segment of The Late Late Show with James Corden, and sang the track in the car with its host. Gaga closed her set at the Super Bowl LI halftime show with "Bad Romance", wearing a silver, sequined Versace outfit with a shoulder pad-inspired jacket and hot pants. The song was performed alongside "Poker Face" as an encore during both weekends that Gaga headlined Coachella in 2017. On the Joanne World Tour (2017–2018), Gaga performed "Bad Romance" wearing a white origami-like jacket and a crystal embellished bodysuit with a matching white feathery masquerade mask and Giuseppe Zanotti booties. She did a piano rendition of the song at the 2017 Toronto International Film Festival, before the world premiere of her documentary, Gaga: Five Foot Two.

Gaga sang "Bad Romance" during her residency show, Lady Gaga Enigma + Jazz & Piano (2018–2022), which was divided into two shows. On Enigma, she performed it in a champagne-hued gold outfit, and on Jazz & Piano, she did a stripped-down version. "Bad Romance" was the opening number for The Chromatica Ball, Gaga's 2022 stadium tour, where she performed it from inside a leather sarcophagus-type garment. Nick Levine from NME opined that opening the concert with "Bad Romance", and her previous hit songs—"Poker Face" and "Just Dance"—showed that Gaga had "gumption" and the choice was "clever and daring". "Bad Romance" next appeared on Gaga's 2025 promotional concerts for Mayhem, including a headlining set at Coachella 2025, and the Mayhem Ball (2025-2026). After leaving the stage at the end of "Vanish into You", she was brought back in on a table by her dancers dressed as plague doctors. Resurrected in an elaborate feathered costume, she performed "Bad Romance" as the final number of the concerts.

== Cover versions ==
On March 29, 2010, Thirty Seconds to Mars covered the song in BBC Radio 1's Live Lounge, which reached number 11 on the UK Rock Chart. The song was covered by American rock band Halestorm as part of their EP Reanimate: The Covers EP, with their cover certified Gold by the RIAA. Singer Lissie posted a cover of the song on YouTube, which received praise from filmmaker David Lynch. The cast of the musical television series Glee performed it on an episode as a group number for which the actors donned Gaga outfits. The song reached number 54 on the Billboard Hot 100 in June 2010. At the 46th Annual Songwriters Hall of Fame Awards, Linda Perry sang the song in a slowed down rendition, before Tony Bennett presented the Contemporary Icon Award to Gaga. "Bad Romance" was briefly played on violin by Geoffrey Rush, portraying Albert Einstein in a promo for the National Geographic Channel historical anthology series Genius. The ad aired during Super Bowl LI immediately after Gaga's halftime performance.

== Track listing and formats ==
Digital download

1. "Bad Romance" – 4:54

Digital EP

1. "Bad Romance" – 4:54
2. "Bad Romance" (Hercules & Love Affair Remix) – 5:11
3. "Bad Romance" (Chew Fu Remix) – 7:14
4. "Bad Romance" (Starsmith Remix) – 4:55
5. "Bad Romance" (Music Video) – 5:14

European CD single

1. "Bad Romance" (Radio Edit) – 4:24
2. "Bad Romance" (Main) – 4:54

German digital download – remix version

1. "Bad Romance" (Radio Edit) – 4:21
2. "Bad Romance" (Chew Fu Remix) – 7:13
3. "Bad Romance" (Starsmith Remix) – 4:55
4. "Bad Romance" (Grum Remix) – 4:50
5. "Bad Romance" (Bimbo Jones Radio Remix) – 3:58
6. "Bad Romance" (Hercules & Love Affair Remix) – 5:11
7. "Bad Romance" (Hercules & Love Affair Dub Remix) – 5:11
8. "Bad Romance" (Music Video) – 5:14

US digital EP – The Remixes

1. "Bad Romance" (Chew Fu H1N1 Fix) – 7:14
2. "Bad Romance" (Kaskade Remix) – 4:20
3. "Bad Romance" (Bimbo Jones Radio Remix) – 3:58
4. "Bad Romance" (Skrillex Remix) – 4:23

US CD single – The Remixes

1. "Bad Romance" (Chew Fu H1N1 Fix) – 7:14
2. "Bad Romance" (Kaskade Remix) – 4:20
3. "Bad Romance" (Bimbo Jones Remix) – 3:58
4. "Bad Romance" (Skrillex Remix) – 4:23
5. "Bad Romance" (Grum Remix) – 4:51
6. "Bad Romance" (Richard Vission Remix) – 5:23
7. "Bad Romance" (Hercules & Love Affair Remix) – 5:12

US digital EP – The Remixes Pt. 2

1. "Bad Romance" (Grum Remix) – 4:50
2. "Bad Romance" (Richard Vission Remix) – 5:22
3. "Bad Romance" (Hercules & Love Affair Remix) – 5:12
4. "Bad Romance" (Hercules & Love Affair Dub Remix) – 5:12
5. "Bad Romance" (DJ Dan Remix) – 3:44

== Personnel ==
Credits adapted from the liner notes of The Fame Monster.

Recording locations

- Recorded at Record Plant Studios (Los Angeles) and FC Walvisch (Amsterdam)
- Mastered at Oasis Mastering (Burbank, California)

Credits

- Lady Gaga – lead vocals, co-producer, vocal arrangement, background vocals
- Nadir "RedOne" Khayat – producer, vocal editing, vocal arrangement, background vocals, audio engineering, instrumentation, programming, recording
- Johny Severin – vocal editing
- Dave Russell – audio engineering
- Eelco Bakker – audio engineering
- Mark "Spike" Stent – audio mixing
- Gene Grimaldi – audio mastering

== Charts ==
=== Weekly charts ===
Weekly chart performance
Chart (2009–2010)	Peak position
Australia (ARIA)	2
Australia Dance (ARIA)	2
Austria (Ö3 Austria Top 40)	1
Belgium (Ultratop 50 Flanders)	2
Belgium (Ultratop 50 Wallonia)	3
Brazil (Hot 100 Airplay)	4
Bulgaria International Airplay (BAMP)	1
Canada Hot 100 (Billboard)	1
Canada AC (Billboard)	23
Canada CHR/Top 40 (Billboard)	1
Canada Hot AC (Billboard)	1
CIS Airplay (TopHit)	1
Croatia International Airplay (Top lista)	1
Czech Republic Airplay (ČNS IFPI)	1
Denmark (Tracklisten)	1
European Hot 100 Singles (Billboard)	1
Finland (Suomen virallinen lista)	1
France (SNEP)	1
Germany (GfK)	1
Global Dance Songs (Billboard)	1
Greece Digital Song Sales (Billboard)	1
Hungary (Rádiós Top 40)	1
Hungary (Single Top 40)	2
Hungary (Dance Top 40)	1
Iceland (RÚV)	1
Ireland (IRMA)	1
Israel International Airplay (Media Forest)	1
Italy Airplay (EarOne)	8
Italy (FIMI)	1
Japan (Japan Hot 100)	9
Luxembourg Digital (Billboard)	2
Mexico (Billboard Mexican Airplay)	1
Mexico Anglo (Monitor Latino)	1
Netherlands (Dutch Top 40)	10
Netherlands (Single Top 100)	7
New Zealand (Recorded Music NZ)	2
Norway (VG-lista)	1
Poland Dance (ZPAV)	3
Portugal Digital (Billboard)	2
Romania Airplay (Media Forest)	1
Romania TV Airplay (Media Forest)	1
Russia Airplay (TopHit)	2
Scottish Singles Sales (Official Charts)	1
Slovakia Airplay (ČNS IFPI)	1
South Korea International (Gaon)	27
South Korea International (Gaon) Kaskade remix	16
Spain (Promusicae)	1
Sweden (Sverigetopplistan)	1
Switzerland (Schweizer Hitparade)	2
UK Singles (Official Charts)	1
Ukraine Airplay (TopHit)	2
US Billboard Hot 100	2
US Adult Contemporary (Billboard)	20
US Adult Pop Airplay (Billboard)	7
US Dance Club Songs (Billboard)	1
US Dance Airplay (Billboard)	1
US Hot Latin Songs (Billboard)	13
US Pop Airplay (Billboard)	1
US Rhythmic Airplay (Billboard)	6

Weekly chart performance
Chart (2017–2025)	Peak position
Brazil Hot 100 (Billboard)	23
France (SNEP)	183
Global 200 (Billboard)	81
Kazakhstan Airplay (TopHit)	178
Poland (Polish Airplay Top 100)	43
Portugal (AFP)	130
Singapore (RIAS)	17
US Hot Dance/Electronic Songs (Billboard)	6

=== Monthly charts ===
Monthly chart performance
Chart (2010)	Peak position
CIS Airplay (TopHit)	2
Russia Airplay (TopHit)	2
Ukraine Airplay (TopHit)	5

=== Year-end charts ===
Year-end chart performance
Chart (2009)	Position
Australia (ARIA)	31
Australia Dance (ARIA)	9
Austria (Ö3 Austria Top 40)	27
Belgium (Ultratop 50 Flanders)	86
CIS Airplay (TopHit)	143
Denmark (Tracklisten)	42
Hungary (Dance Top 40)	70
Hungary (Rádiós Top 40)	133
Ireland (IRMA)	10
Italy (FIMI)	18
New Zealand (Recorded Music NZ)	29
Norway (VG-lista)	19
Russia Airplay (TopHit)	136
Sweden (Sverigetopplistan)	12
Taiwan (Yearly Singles Top 100)	12
UK Singles (Official Charts)	17

Year-end chart performance
Chart (2010)	Position
Australia (ARIA)	26
Australia Dance (ARIA)	4
Austria (Ö3 Austria Top 40)	9
Belgium (Ultratop 50 Flanders)	31
Belgium (Ultratop 50 Wallonia)	10
Canada (Canadian Hot 100)	3
CIS Airplay (TopHit)	19
Croatia International Airplay (HRT)	17
Denmark (Tracklisten)	28
European Hot 100 Singles (Billboard)	1
France (SNEP)	11
Germany (Official German Charts)	17
Hungary (Dance Top 40)	7
Hungary (Rádiós Top 40)	5
Ireland (IRMA)	12
Italy (FIMI)	9
Japan (Japan Hot 100)	26
Japan Adult Contemporary (Billboard)	5
Netherlands (Dutch Top 40)	54
Netherlands (Single Top 100)	57
New Zealand (Recorded Music NZ)	31
Romania (Romanian Top 100)	13
Russia Airplay (TopHit)	23
South Korea International Singles (Gaon)	89
Spain (PROMUSICAE)	6
Sweden (Sverigetopplistan)	15
Switzerland (Schweizer Hitparade)	13
Ukraine Airplay (TopHit)	8
UK Singles (Official Charts)	30
US Billboard Hot 100	8
US Adult Contemporary (Billboard)	48
US Adult Pop Airplay (Billboard)	27
US Dance Club Songs (Billboard)	2
US Hot Latin Songs (Billboard)	64
US Pop Airplay (Billboard)	3
US Radio Songs (Billboard)	8
US Rhythmic Airplay (Billboard)	28
Worldwide (IFPI)	2

Year-end chart performance
Chart (2011)	Position
CIS Airplay (TopHit)	160
Russia Airplay (TopHit)	181
Ukraine Airplay (TopHit)	118

Year-end chart performance
Chart (2017)	Position
US Hot Dance/Electronic Songs (Billboard)	42

=== Decade-end charts ===
Decade-end chart performance
Chart (2010–19)	Position
US Billboard Hot 100	84

=== All-time charts ===
All-time chart performance
Chart	Position
US Pop Airplay (Billboard)	48

== Certifications and sales ==
Certifications and sales
Region	Certification	Certified units/sales
Australia (ARIA)	11× Platinum	770,000^{‡}
Austria (IFPI Austria)	2× Platinum	60,000^{*}
Belgium (BRMA)	Gold	15,000^{*}
Brazil (Pro-Música Brasil)	Diamond	250,000^{‡}
Canada (Music Canada)	Diamond	800,000^{‡}
Denmark (IFPI Danmark)	2× Platinum	180,000^{‡}
France (SNEP)	Platinum	250,000^{*}
Germany (BVMI)	3× Gold	450,000^{‡}
Italy (FIMI)	2× Platinum	40,000^{*}
Japan (RIAJ) Digital single	Gold	100,000^{*}
Japan (RIAJ) Ringtone	Gold	100,000^{*}
New Zealand (RMNZ)	5× Platinum	150,000^{‡}
Norway (IFPI Norway)	8× Platinum	480,000^{‡}
Russia (NFPF) ringtone	Gold	100,000^{*}
South Korea	—	217,706
Spain (Promusicae)	2× Platinum	120,000^{‡}
Sweden (GLF)	2× Platinum	40,000^{‡}
Switzerland (IFPI Switzerland)	Platinum	30,000^{^}
United Kingdom (BPI)	4× Platinum	2,400,000^{‡}
United States (RIAA)	11× Platinum	11,000,000^{‡}
Summaries
Worldwide	—	12,000,000
^{*} Sales figures based on certification alone.^{^} Shipments figures based on certification alone.^{‡} Sales+streaming figures based on certification alone.

== Release history ==
Release dates and formats
Region	Date	Format	Version	Label(s)	Ref.
France	October 19, 2009	Radio airplay	Original	Universal	
France	October 23, 2009	Digital download	Original	Interscope	
Ireland	October 23, 2009	Digital download	Original	Universal	
United Kingdom	October 25, 2009	Digital download	Original	Universal	
United States	October 26, 2009	Digital download	Original	Interscope	
Finland	October 27, 2009	Digital download	Original	Universal	
Germany	October 27, 2009	Digital download	Original	Universal	
Norway	October 27, 2009	Digital download	Original	Universal	
Spain	October 27, 2009	Digital download	Original	Universal	
Sweden	October 27, 2009	Digital download	Original	Universal	
United States	November 10, 2009	Contemporary hit radio	Original	Interscope	
Various	November 23, 2009	7-inch vinyl	Original	Interscope; KonLive; Streamline	
Italy	November 27, 2009	Radio airplay	Original	Universal	
Various	December 21, 2009	Digital download	Remixes	Interscope	
United States	January 12, 2010	CD	Remixes	Interscope	
Various	February 9, 2010	Digital download	Remixes Part 2	Interscope	

== See also ==
- List of best-selling singles
- List of best-selling singles in the United States
- List of number-one hits of 2009 (Austria)
- List of Hot 100 number-one singles of 2009 (Canada)
- List of number-one hits in Denmark
- List of number-one singles (Sweden)
- List of number-one singles of 2009 and 2010 (Finland)
- List of number-one hits of 2009 (Italy)
- List of number-one singles of 2009 and 2010 (Ireland)
- List of number-one singles of 2009 and 2010 (UK)
- List of European number-one hits of 2010
- List of number-one hits of 2010 (France)
- List of number-one hits of 2010 (Germany)
- List of number-one singles of 2010 (Hungary)
- List of Romanian Top 100 number ones of the 2010s
- List of number-one dance singles of 2009 (U.S.)
- List of number-one dance singles of 2010 (U.S.)
- List of number-one dance airplay hits of 2010 (U.S.)
- List of Mainstream Top 40 number-one hits of 2010 (U.S.)
- List of number-one singles of 2010 (Spain)
- List of most-viewed YouTube videos
- List of highest-certified singles in Australia

== Bibliography ==
- Chatzipapatheodoridis, Constantine (2021). The Music Diva Spectacle: Camp, Female Performers, and Queer Audiences in the Arena Tour Show. Intellect Books. ISBN 978-1-789-38437-6.
- Deflem, Mathieu (2017). Lady Gaga and the Sociology of Fame: the Rise of a Pop Star in an Age of Celebrity. Palgrave Macmillan. ISBN 978-1-137-58468-7.
- Herbert, Emily (2010). "A Glimpse of Genius". Lady Gaga: Behind the Fame. The Overlook Press. pp. 213–224. ISBN 978-1-590-20423-8.
- Horn, Katrin (2017). "Taking Pop Seriously: Lady Gaga as Camp". Women, Camp, and Popular Culture: Serious Excess. Palgrave Macmillan. pp. 193–252. ISBN 978-3-319-64845-3.
- Iddon, Martin; Marshall, Melanie L., eds. (2014). Lady Gaga and Popular Music: Performing Gender, Fashion, and Culture. Routledge Studies in Popular Music. Routledge. ISBN 978-1-134-07987-2.
  - Gray, Sally; Rutnam, Anusha (2014). "Her Own Real Thing: Lady Gaga and the House of Fashion". Lady Gaga and Popular Music : Performing Gender, Fashion, and Culture. Routledge. pp. 43–66. ISBN 978-1-134-07987-2.
  - Hegarty, Paul (2014). "Lady Gaga and the Drop: Eroticism High and Low". Lady Gaga and Popular Music: Performing Gender, Fashion, and Culture. Routledge Studies in Popular Music. Routledge. pp. 82–93. ISBN 978-1-134-07987-2.
- Jakubowski, Kelly; Finkel, Sebastian; Stewart, Lauren; Müllensiefen, Daniel (May 2017). "Dissecting an Earworm: Melodic Features and Song Popularity Predict Involuntary Musical Imagery" (PDF). Psychology of Aesthetics, Creativity, and the Arts. 11 (2). American Psychological Association: 122–135. doi:10.1037/aca0000090. Archived (PDF) from the original on October 4, 2022.
- James, Robin (2015). "(Little) Monsters & Melancholics". Resilience & Melancholy: Pop Music, Feminism, Neoliberalism. John Hunt Publishing. pp. 133–173. ISBN 978-1-782-79461-5.
- Lynch, Annette (2012). "The Birth of Pop Culture Porn Chic". Porn Chic: Exploring the Contours of Raunch Eroticism. A & C Black. pp. 37–54. ISBN 978-1-472-52013-5.
- Padva, Gilad (January 2, 2018). "Queer Nostalgia in Cinema and Pop Culture". Journal of LGBT Youth. 15 (1). Palgrave Macmillan: 173–199. doi:10.1057/9781137266347. ISBN 978-1-137-26633-0.
- Santos, Jennifer M. (2012). "Body Language and 'Bad Romance': The Visual Rhetoric of the Artist". In Gray II, Richard (ed.). The Performance Identities of Lady Gaga. McFarland & Company. pp. 52–73. ISBN 978-0-786-46830-0.
