= Issues (The Saturdays song) =

2009 single by the Saturdays

Single by The Saturdays

from the album Chasing Lights
- B-side: "Beggin'"
- Released: 4 January 2009 (digital); 5 January 2009 (physical)
- Recorded: 2008
- Genre: Pop
- Length: 3:38
- Label: Polydor, Fascination
- Songwriters: Evan Rogers, Carl Sturken
- Producers: Sturken, Rogers

The Saturdays singles chronology
| "Up" (2008) | "Issues" (2009) | "Just Can't Get Enough" (2009) |

Music video
- "Issues" on YouTube

"Issues" is a song British-Irish girl group The Saturdays, from their debut studio album Chasing Lights. It was released on 5 January 2009 as the third single from the album. The song was written and produced by Carl Sturken and Evan Rogers. The single received mixed reviews from music critics.

BBC Music stated that the song was very diva-ish, and the band are divas in the making. Upon the release of the single, "Issues" gained a lot of chart success after charting at number four in the United Kingdom and number fourteen in the Republic of Ireland. The single also charted at number twenty-one on Eurochart Hot 100 Singles.

Prior to its single release, the lyrics to "Issues" were re-recorded after being misinterpreted as promoting violence, as the lyrics "can't decide if I should slap you or kiss you" left many people misunderstanding the word "slap" as "stab", the lyrics were changed to "can't decide if I should leave you or kiss you".

== Critical reception ==
"Issues" received mostly mixed reviews from pop music critics. James Masterton of Yahoo! Music described the song as a "drippy mid-Atlantic love ballad" that lacked the "spark, energy and sheer excitement" of the group's past singles. He stated that the single was not as fun as the band's previous two singles. In a review for Allmusic, Jon O'Brien called the track "dated" and wrote that it "sounds like a Max Martin reject from the '90s".

Vanessa White opens the song with the first verse, she sings the first bridge with backing vocals of Mollie King and the second with backing vocals of Frankie Sandford. White and Sandford take lead on the chorus as Una Healy and Rochelle Wiseman take lower harmony's and King takes higher harmony's. Wiseman takes the second verse as Healy takes the middle 8 with backing vocals of Wiseman and King. The final chorus has ad-libs from White.

== Chart performance ==
After the album was released, the single jumped straight into the UK Singles Chart at number eighty-four, and two weeks later dropped out of the top 100 singles. After the release of the single, "Issues" stop up the UK Singles Charts and securing the chart position at number four, on 24 January 2009, it later spent 4 weeks in the UK Official Top 10 Singles and 18 weeks in the UK Official Top 40 Singles. It was then the band's highest peak position, after charting higher than previous singles "If This Is Love" and "Up". It was their highest non-charity single until being surpassed by "Forever Is Over".

The single entered the Irish Singles Charts at number thirty-six before moving further up the charts and placing itself at number fourteen. The single remained on the Irish Top 50 Singles for eleven weeks. Prior to the single's release, the band also released the song on the European Billboard, where it gained a peak position of number twenty-one, at the time, it was the second-best chart success the band had on the Europe.

In the middle of 2009, "Issues" was also gained a certification of Silver by British Phonographic Industry, it was the Saturdays' second single to gain a certification of silver, after selling over 200,000 copies in the UK.

== Controversy ==
Prior to its single release, there was minor controversy surrounding "Issues". This was due to the line "can't decide if I should slap you or kiss you" as many listeners misheard "slap you" as "stab you". Radio stations were worried this would promote violence and therefore refused to play the song until it was changed. The Saturdays re-recorded "slap you" as "leave you" for the single release. After this was done, radio stations added "Issues" to their playlists.

The music video uses the original version of the song, whilst radio stations played the single version.

== Music video ==
=== Background ===
A scene from the video for "Issues" where The Saturdays are standing around a blazing fire.

"Issues" music video was filmed in Whitstable, Kent. Prior to the release of "Up", the "Issues" music video was filmed before "Up" as the band were planning on releasing it as the second official single, but the label decided otherwise. The music video was filmed on 13 November 2008. Throughout the video, the group is seen standing at the shore of the seaside, with different coloured coats on. There are many scenes where they are seen looking through windows of a house. They are pictured wearing a number of different outfits throughout the whole video. They have different colour umbrellas. The video premiered 5 December 2008.

=== Synopsis ===
As the video starts, it's an image of the old fashioned beach house, where the group is seen inside of later on in the video. As Vanessa starts singing, she is looking out of the beach house window, at her bandmates who are on the beach. They are seen wearing winter clothes from Next. Frankie is seen laying on a sheep skin rug, in front of the fire. As the chorus kicks in, the girls walk down the beachfront singing along to the song. As the first chorus of the song finishes, they are seen walking from the beach house with different coloured umbrellas walking in a straight line; Rochelle has a pink umbrella, Una has a green one, Mollie has a blue one, Vanessa a purple one and Frankie a red one. As the lyrics sing I keep building a wall over my heart, the group stand behind a white fence, which could represent the wall between the men and their hearts. As the video is starting to come to an end, the girls are seen standing around a blazing fire, which could represent them trying to burn away all the memory of their heartbreak.

== Formats and track listings ==
UK CD single
(Released 5 January 2009)

1. "Issues" (Radio Mix) - 3:36
2. "Beggin'" (Bob Gaudio, Peggy Farina) - 3:12

Digital single #1
(Released 4 January 2009)

1. "Issues" (Radio Mix) - 3:36
2. "Issues" (Vince Clarke Club Mix) - 5:45

Digital single #2
(Released 3 January 2009)

1. "Issues" (Radio Mix) - 3:36
2. "Issues" (Digital Dog Club Mix) - 5:57

The Remixes

1. "Issues" (Digital Dog Radio Edit) - 3:05
2. "Issues" (Digital Dog Club Mix) - 5:57
3. "Issues" (Vince Clarke Radio Mix) - 3:47
4. "Issues" (Vince Clarke Club Mix) - 5:45

Revamped Version

1. "Issues" (Radio Mix) - 3:36
2. "Beggin' - 3:09
3. "Issues" (Live MTV Nokia Session) - 3:50
4. "Issues" (Digital Dog Radio Edit) - 3:02
5. "Issues" (Vince Clarke Radio Edit) - 3:45
6. "Issues" (Digital Dog Club Mix) - 5:53
7. "Issues" (Vince Clarke Club Mix) - 5:43

== Personnel ==
The following people contributed to "Issues":

- Evan Rogers – production
- Carl Sturken – production, instrumentation
- Jeremy Wheatley – additional production, mixing
- Al Hemberger – mixing
- Dick Beetham – mastering

== Charts ==
=== Weekly charts ===
| Chart (2008–2009) | Peak position |
|---|---|
| European Hot 100 Singles (Billboard) | 21 |
| Ireland (IRMA) | 14 |
| Scotland Singles (OCC) | 4 |
| UK Singles (OCC) | 4 |

=== Year-end charts ===
| Chart (2009) | Position |
|---|---|
| UK Singles (OCC) | 82 |

== Certifications ==
| Region | Certification | Certified units/sales |
|---|---|---|
| United Kingdom (BPI) | Gold | 400,000^{‡} |
^{‡} Sales+streaming figures based on certification alone.
