= This Is My Life (Edward Maya song) =

Single by Edward Maya featuring Vika Jigulina

from the album The Stereo Love Show
- B-side: "This Is My Life (Remix)"
- Released: January 2010
- Genre: House
- Length: 3:50
- Label: Play On, Sony-BMG, Ultra Records (U.S.)
- Songwriters: Victoria Corneva, Edward Maya
- Producers: Edward Maya, Victoria Corneva

Edward Maya featuring Vika Jigulina singles chronology
| "Stereo Love" (2009) | "This Is My Life" (2010) | "Desert Rain" (2010) |

"This Is My Life" is a song by Romanian musician and producer Edward Maya, featuring vocals by Vika Jigulina. It was released in 2010 as the second single from his The Stereo Love Show album, following his international hit "Stereo Love".

== Track listing ==
Digital Remixes

1. "This Is My Life" (feat. Vika Jigulina) - 3:50
2. "This Is My Life" (feat. Vika Jigulina) [Exetended Version] - 4:48
3. "This Is My Life" (feat. Vika Jigulina) [Digital Dog Dub Edit] - 6:03
4. "This Is My Life" (feat. Vika Jigulina) [Digital Dog Extended Edit] - 6:02
5. "This Is My Life" (feat. Vika Jigulina) [Digital Dog Radio Edit V3] - 2:28
6. "This Is My Life" (feat. Vika Jigulina) [Ruff Loaderz Club Mix] - 6:37
7. "This Is My Life" (feat. Vika Jigulina) [Ruff Loaderz Dub Mix] - 6:37
8. "This Is My Life" (feat. Vika Jigulina) [Ruff Loaderz Radio Edit] - 4:48

== Charts ==
=== Weekly charts ===
| Chart (2010) | Peak position |
|---|---|
| Austria (Ö3 Austria Top 40) | 54 |
| Belgium (Ultratip Bubbling Under Flanders) | 4 |
| Belgium (Ultratop 50 Wallonia) | 12 |
| Finland (Suomen virallinen lista) | 7 |
| France (SNEP) | 2 |
| Greece Digital Song Sales (Billboard) | 1 |
| Hungary (Dance Top 40) | 16 |
| Hungary (Rádiós Top 40) | 29 |
| Netherlands (Dutch Top 40) | 24 |
| Netherlands (Single Top 100) | 42 |
| Poland (Dance Top 50) | 46 |
| Romania (Romanian Top 100) | 3 |
| Slovakia Airplay (ČNS IFPI) | 23 |
| Sweden (Sverigetopplistan) | 58 |
| Switzerland (Schweizer Hitparade) | 43 |
| UK Dance (OCC) | 36 |

=== Year-end charts ===
| Chart (2010) | Position |
|---|---|
| Belgium (Ultratop Wallonia) | 71 |
| European Hot 100 Singles | 71 |
| Hungary (Dance Top 40) | 66 |
| Romania (Romanian Top 100) | 53 |

== Certifications ==
| Region | Certification | Certified units/sales |
|---|---|---|
| Sweden (GLF) | Platinum | 40,000^{‡} |
^{‡} Sales+streaming figures based on certification alone.

== See also ==
- List of music released by Romanian artists that has charted in major music markets
- List of music released by Moldovan artists that has charted in major music markets
