= Sean Finn (DJ) =

German DJ from Stuttgart

- Born: Stuttgart, Germany
- Genres: House
- Years active: 2015–present
- Website: seanfinn.com

Sean Finn is a German DJ from Stuttgart.

== Early life and career ==
Finn started DJing at a club in Germany called M1. Having performed alongside DJs such as Eric Prydz, Benny Benassi and Sebastian Ingrosso, Finn played a significant part in the "House Boom".

== Discography ==
=== Charted singles ===
Title	Year	Peak chart positions		Album
Title	Year	US Dance	US Club	Album
"Summertime Girl"	2015	–	22	Non-album singles
"Come To Me"	2017	–	8	Non-album singles
"Free"	2017	40	6	Non-album singles
