= Edward Maya =

Romanian musician (born 1986)

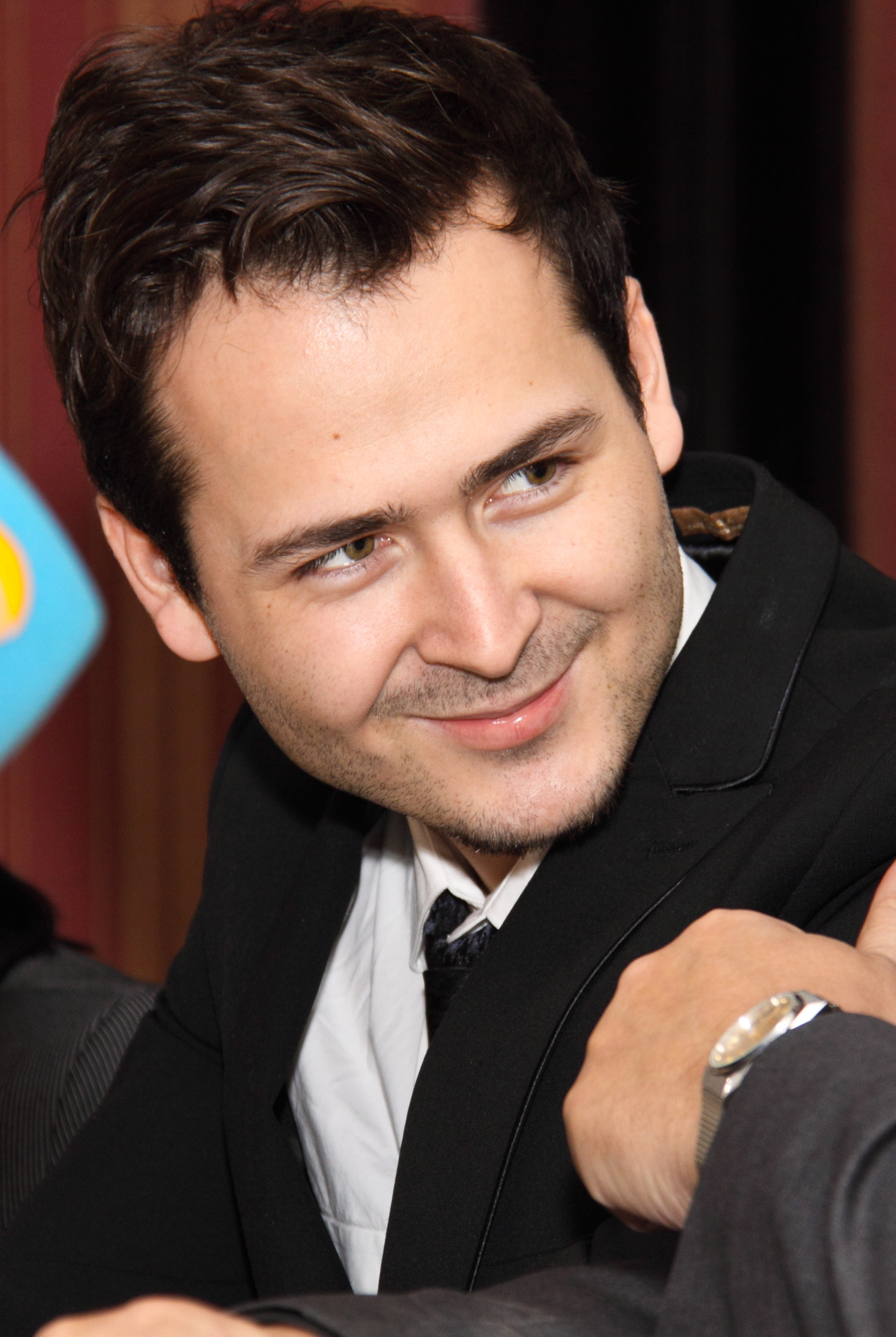
- Maya in 2010

Background information
- Born: Eduard Marian Ilie; 29 June 1986 (age 40); Bucharest, Socialist Republic of Romania
- Genres: Popcorn; house; progressive house; deep house; EDM; electro house; Eurodance; tropical house
- Occupations: Musician; record producer; DJ; songwriter
- Instruments: Accordion; keyboards; guitar; flute; piano; bagpipes
- Years active: 2006–present
- Label: Mayavin Records
- Website: www.edwardmaya.com

Eduard Marian Ilie (Romanian pronunciation: [ˈedu.ard mariˈan iˈli.e]; born 29 June 1986), better known by his stage name Edward Maya, is a Romanian musician, record producer, DJ and songwriter. He is known for his 2009 smash hit single "Stereo Love".

== Career ==
In and around 2006, Maya worked with many other Romanian artists such as Akcent and Vika Jigulina. He also worked on the song Tornerò, which was performed by Mihai Trăistariu in the Eurovision Song Contest 2006. He added in an interview on Beat-Town.com that this song "was the beginning of my career".

In the summer of 2009, Maya launched his first song as an artist, "Stereo Love", reaching No. 2 on the Romanian singles chart. Later that year, "Stereo Love" became an international hit in clubs. While this success was followed by concerts worldwide, the song entered the top-5 singles charts in Austria, Denmark, Finland, France, Germany, Ireland, Italy, the Netherlands, Norway, Spain, Sweden, Switzerland, and the UK.

On 13 May 2010, Maya released his second single "This Is My Life". To help maintain control of his career and provide opportunities for other artists, Maya has formed his own record label, Mayavin Records.

Maya released the song and video for his third single "Desert Rain" on Christmas night worldwide. In an interview, Maya talked about his Desert Rain tour, where he mentioned he would begin in India and later Europe, the US, South Africa and Pakistan. His fourth single "Mono in Love" was released on 29 November 2012 also featuring Vika Jigulina.

He graduated from George Enescu Music High School in Bucharest and is currently a final year student at the Bucharest Conservatory.

Maya voiced Grug in the Romanian dub for the 2020 animated movie Onward.

In February 2026, he was announced as an automatic finalist in the San Marino Song Contest 2026, the national final for the Eurovision Song Contest 2026, alongside William Imola with the song "Balla". They failed to win, finishing outside of the top 4.

== Discography ==
=== Studio albums ===
List of studio albums
Title	Album details
The Stereo Love Show	Released: 3 December 2013; Label: Mayavin Records; Formats: Digital download
Angels	Released: 4 November 2014; Label: Mayavin Records; Formats: Digital download

=== Singles ===
List of singles, with selected chart positions and certifications, showing year released and album name
Title	Year	Peak chart positions											Certifications	Album
Title	Year	BEL	CAN	FRA	IRE	NLD	POR	SPA	SWE	SWI	UK	US	Certifications	Album
"Stereo Love" (with Vika Jigulina or Mia Martina)	2009	2	10	1	1	1	1	1	1	2	4	16	BEA: Gold; MC: 2× Platinum; BVMI: 2× Platinum; PROMUSICAE: 2× Platinum; GLF: 7× Platinum; IFPI SWI: Platinum; BPI: 2× Platinum; RIAA: 2× Platinum	The Stereo Love Show / Devotion
"This Is My Life" (featuring Vika Jigulina)	2010	12	—	2	—	42	7	—	58	43	—	—	GLF: Platinum	The Stereo Love Show / Devotion
"Desert Rain" (featuring Vika Jigulina)	2010	—	—	—	—	—	9	—	—	—	—	—		Non-album single
"Mono in Love" (featuring Vika Jigulina)	2012	—	—	—	—	—	—	—	—	—	—	—		The Stereo Love Show
"Feeling"	2013	—	—	—	—	—	—	—	—	—	—	—		Non-album singles
"Colombian Girl"	2014	—	—	—	—	—	—	—	—	—	—	—		Non-album singles
"Love of My Life" (with Vika Jigulina)	2014	—	—	—	—	—	—	—	—	—	—	—		Non-album singles
"Historia de Amor"	2014	—	—	—	—	—	—	—	—	—	—	—		Non-album singles
"Universal Love" (featuring Andrea and Costi Ioniţă)	2015	—	—	—	—	—	—	—	—	—	—	—		Non-album singles
"Harem" (featuring Emilia and Costi Ioniţă)	2018	—	—	—	—	—	—	—	—	—	—	—		Non-album singles
"Sunny Days" (featuring United People)	2019	—	—	—	—	—	—	—	—	—	—	—		Non-album singles
"Holding On" (featuring Sleeping Muse and Violet Light)	2019	—	—	—	—	—	—	—	—	—	—	—		Non-album singles
"Be Free" (featuring Vika Jigulina)	2019	—	—	—	—	—	—	—	—	—	—	—		Non-album singles
"Simply the Best" (featuring Violet Light)	2020	—	—	—	—	—	—	—	—	—	—	—		Non-album singles
"The Show Must Go On" (featuring Violet Light)	2020	—	—	—	—	—	—	—	—	—	—	—		Non-album singles
"Live Alive" (with Avalok and Violet Light)	2021	—	—	—	—	—	—	—	—	—	—	—		Non-album singles
"Feel Your Love" (with Dimitri Vegas & Like Mike and Timmy Trumpet)	2021	—	—	—	—	—	—	—	—	—	—	—		Non-album singles
"In My Dreams" (featuring Violet Light)	2022	—	—	—	—	—	—	—	—	—	—	—		Non-album singles
"I'm in Love" (featuring Eliza and Avalok)	2022	—	—	—	—	—	—	—	—	—	—	—		Non-album singles
"I Found You" (featuring Eliza and Avalok)	2022	—	—	—	—	—	—	—	—	—	—	—		Non-album singles
"Be Your Friend" (with Cheat Codes and Enisa)	2025	—	—	—	—	—	—	—	—	—	—	—		Future Renaissance
"Life" (with Syn Cole)	2025	—	—	—	—	—	—	—	—	—	—	—		Non-album singles
"Robas El Alba" (with John Dice)	2026	—	—	—	—	—	—	—	—	—	—	—		Non-album singles
"—" denotes a recording that did not chart or was not released in that territory.

== See also ==
- List of music released by Romanian artists that has charted in major music markets
