= Vika Jigulina =

Moldovan-Romanian singer and DJ (born 1986)

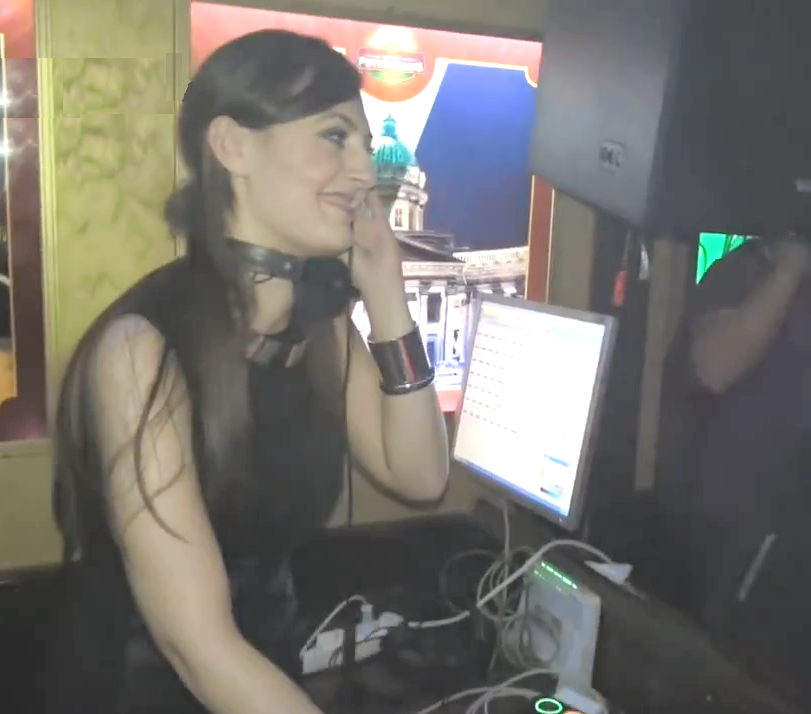
- Jigulina in 2013

Background information
- Born: Victoria Corneva; February 18, 1986 (age 40); Cahul, Moldavian SSR, Soviet Union
- Origin: Bucharest, Romania
- Genres: House; progressive house; tech house; deep house; EDM; electro house; Eurodance; techno; trance
- Occupations: Record producer; singer; DJ
- Instruments: Guitar, piano, vocals
- Years active: 2000–present
- Labels: Cat Music, Mayavin Records, Stereo Tunes Records (UK)

Vika Jigulina (born Victoria Corneva; February 18, 1986) is a Moldovan-Romanian record producer, singer, and DJ.

== Early life and education ==
Jigulina was born on February 18, 1986, in Cahul, a city in the Moldavian SSR of the Soviet Union and currently in Moldova. She is Bulgarian through her mother and Russian through her father. In 2000, she moved to Timișoara, Romania, and continued her studies there while working in a variety of local clubs. Later, after moving to Bucharest, she landed weekly shows on Romanian radio stations that gained her nationwide exposure and fame. In 2010, Jigulina officially became a Romanian citizen.

== Career ==
She is currently working as a disc jockey for Radio 21 Romania and Vibe FM.

Jigulina has made mixes with ATB, Tomcraft, Steve Angello, Sebastian Ingrosso, and other artists. She is widely known as the vocalist in the 2009 international dance hit "Stereo Love" by Romanian producer and musician Edward Maya. Jigulina's first solo single, "Memories," was released on September 29, 2012.

She has also appeared on the cover of the Romanian edition of Playboy in March 2012.

Jigulina was chosen to dub Althea's voice in the 2020 American animated film Onward.

== Discography ==
=== Singles as lead artist ===
List of singles as lead artist, with selected chart positions and certifications, showing year released and album name
Title	Year	Peak chart positions											Certifications	Album
Title	Year	BEL	CAN	FRA	GER	IRE	NLD	SPA	SWE	SWI	UK	US	Certifications	Album
"Stereo Love" (with Edward Maya)	2009	2	19	1	4	1	5	1	1	2	4	16	BEA: Gold; MC: 2× Platinum; BVMI: 2× Platinum; PROMUSICAE: 2× Platinum; GLF: Platinum; IFPI SWI: Platinum; BPI: 2× Platinum; RIAA: Platinum	The Stereo Love Show
"Memories"	2012	—	—	—	—	—	—	—	—	—	—	—		Non-album singles
"Love of My Life" (with Edward Maya)	2014	—	—	—	—	—	—	—	—	—	—	—		Non-album singles
"—" denotes a recording that did not chart or was not released in that territory.

=== Singles as featured artist ===
List of singles as featured artist, with selected chart positions, showing year released and album name
Title	Year	Peak chart positions											Album
Title	Year	BEL	CAN	FRA	GER	IRE	NLD	SPA	SWE	SWI	UK	US	Album
"This Is My Life" (Edward Maya featuring Vika Jigulina)	2010	12	—	2	—	—	42	—	58	43	—	—	The Stereo Love Show
"Desert Rain" (Edward Maya featuring Vika Jigulina)	2011	—	—	—	—	—	—	—	—	—	—	—	Non-album single
"Mono in Love" (Edward Maya featuring Vika Jigulina)	2012	—	—	—	—	—	—	—	—	—	—	—	The Stereo Love Show
"Be Free" (Edward Maya featuring Vika Jigulina)	2019	—	—	—	—	—	—	—	—	—	—	—	Non-album single
"—" denotes a recording that did not chart or was not released in that territory.

== See also ==
- List of music released by Moldovan artists that has charted in major music markets
