= The Saturdays discography =

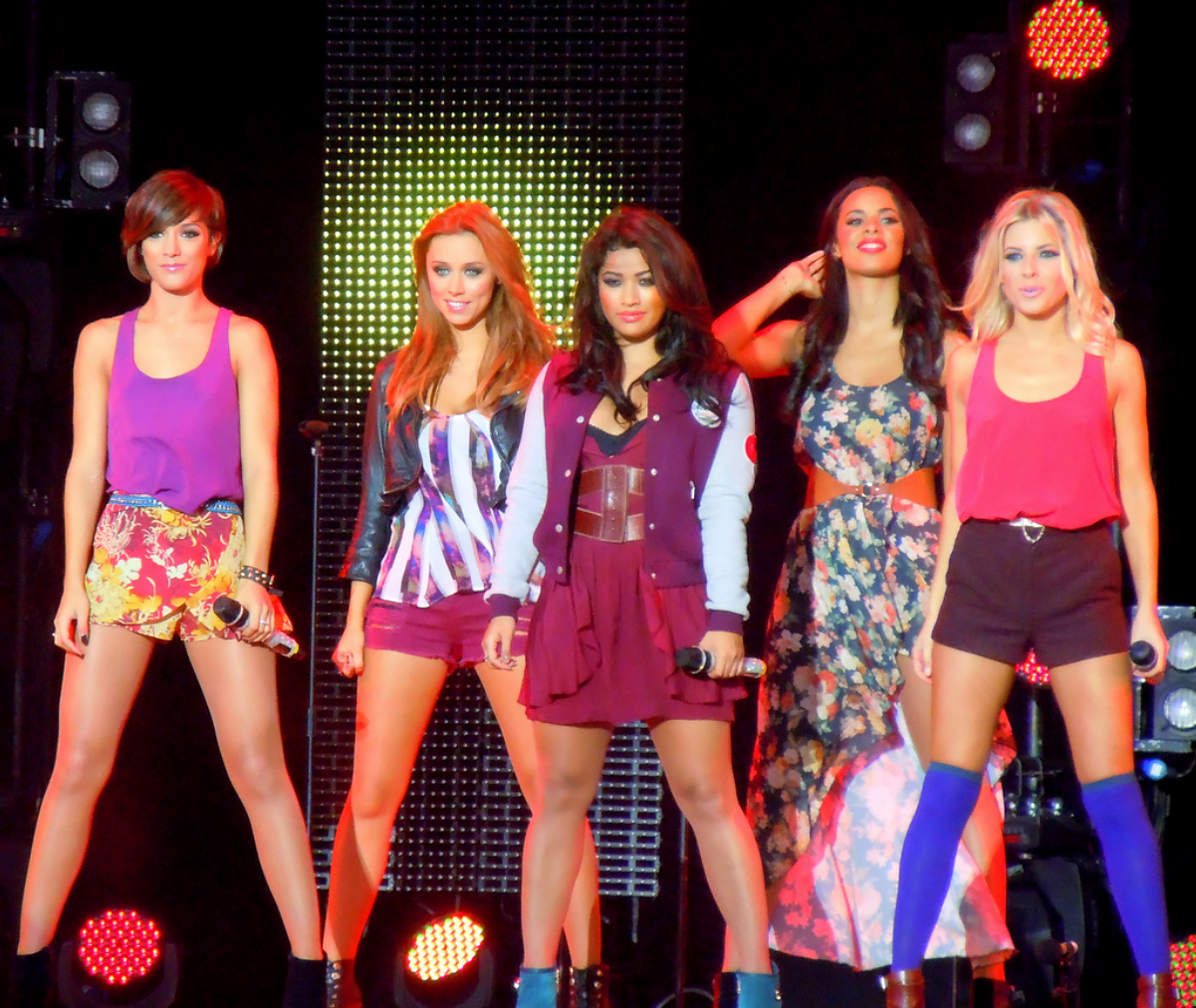
- The Saturdays performing in September 2011
- Studio albums: 4
- Extended plays: 2
- Compilation albums: 1
- Singles: 18
- Video albums: 2
- Music videos: 20

British-Irish girl group The Saturdays have released four studio albums, one compilation album, two extended plays and eighteen singles. The Saturdays were formed in 2007, with a number of different auditions through their management: Frankie Sandford, Rochelle Wiseman, Una Healy, Mollie King and Vanessa White were the successful auditionees and were granted a place within the band.

The Saturdays made their chart debut in July 2008 with "If This Is Love", which reached the top ten in the United Kingdom. Its follow-up single "Up," released in October 2008, debuted at number five on the UK Singles Chart. To date the single has sold over 345,000 copies in the UK alone and stayed in the charts for 30 weeks. The band's debut studio album, Chasing Lights (2008) reached the top ten on the UK Albums Chart and received a Platinum selling status by the British Phonographic Industry (BPI). The album also saw the release of top ten singles on the UK Singles Chart—"Issues" and "Just Can't Get Enough". "Work" was the final single to be released from Chasing Lights.

Wordshaker (2009) was the band's follow-up studio album and also charted within the top ten on the UK Albums Chart and went on to gain a Silver-selling status, with singles "Forever Is Over" and "Ego" charting within the top ten on the UK Singles Chart. Headlines! (2010) was released as the band's first EP and charted at number three on the UK Albums Chart and number ten on the Irish Album Chart. Headlines! saw the release of top ten singles "Missing You" and "Higher" which features guest vocals from Flo Rida. Both singles became massive commercial successes for the band with "Higher" spending 20 weeks on the chart. The Saturdays' third studio album, On Your Radar (2011) contained three highly successful selling singles, two of which—"Notorious" and "All Fired Up" charted within the top ten on the UK Singles Chart. "My Heart Takes Over" was also released from On Your Radar.

In 2012, the band signed a US deal with Mercury Records, and released an extended play, Chasing the Saturdays in the United States and Canada only. The EP consisted of songs previously released by the group in the UK, and also included the new single "What About Us" featuring Sean Paul. The song failed to gain success in the US, but following the song's release in the UK in March 2013, "What About Us" became a big hit. It went straight to No. 1, becoming their first number one single, and was the fastest-selling single of 2013. The band's next single, "Gentleman" did not manage to repeat the band's success, peaking at No. 14 in the UK. The Saturdays later announced the name of their fourth studio album, Living for the Weekend, released on 14 October 2013. The album was preceded by single "Disco Love", which reached No. 5 in the UK, while the album reached No. 10 on the UK albums chart.

== Albums ==
=== Studio albums ===
List of albums, with selected chart positions and certifications
Title	Album details	Peak chart positions				Certifications
Title	Album details	UK	IRE	SCO	US Heat	Certifications
Chasing Lights	Released: 27 October 2008 (UK); Labels: Fascination, Polydor; Formats: CD, digital download	9	34	12	—	BPI: Platinum
Wordshaker	Released: 12 October 2009 (UK); Labels: Fascination, Polydor; Formats: CD, digital download	9	36	8	—	BPI: Silver
On Your Radar	Released: 21 November 2011 (UK); Labels: Fascination, Polydor; Formats: CD, digital download	23	43	21	—	BPI: Silver
Living for the Weekend	Released: 14 October 2013 (UK); Labels: Fascination, Polydor; Formats: CD, digital download	10	16	11	25	
"—" denotes releases that did not chart or were not released in that territory.

=== Compilation albums ===
Title	Album details	Peak chart positions			Certifications
Title	Album details	UK	IRE	SCO	Certifications
Finest Selection: The Greatest Hits	Released: 11 August 2014 (UK); Labels: Fascination, Polydor; Formats: CD, digital download	10	32	9	BPI: Gold

=== Box sets ===
List of albums
Title	Album details
On Your Radar	Released: 21 November 2011; Format: CD, DVD; Label: Polydor, Universal
Finest Selection: The Greatest Hits	Released: 11 August 2014; Format: CD, DVD; Label: Polydor, Universal

== Extended plays ==
List of EPs with selected chart positions
Title	Details	Peak chart positions				Certifications
Title	Details	UK	IRE	SCO	US Heat.	Certifications
Headlines!	Released: 16 August 2010 (UK); Label: Polydor; Format: CD, digital download	3	10	4	—	BPI: Gold
Chasing the Saturdays	Released: 27 January 2013 (US); Labels: Polydor, Mercury; Formats: CD, digital download	—	—	—	5	
"—" denotes releases that did not chart or were not released in that territory.

== Singles ==
List of singles, with selected chart positions and certifications, showing year released and album name
Single	Year	Peak chart positions								Certifications	Album
Single	Year	UK	AUS	CAN	GER	IRE	NZ	SCO	US Dance	Certifications	Album
"If This Is Love"	2008	8	—	—	—	—	—	3	—		Chasing Lights
"Up"	2008	5	—	—	—	11	—	4	—	BPI: Gold	Chasing Lights
"Issues"	2009	4	—	—	—	14	—	4	—	BPI: Gold	Chasing Lights
"Just Can't Get Enough"	2009	2	—	—	—	6	—	1	—	BPI: Gold	Chasing Lights
"Work"	2009	22	—	—	—	21	—	2	—		Chasing Lights
"Forever Is Over"	2009	2	—	—	—	9	—	2	—	BPI: Silver	Wordshaker
"Ego"	2010	9	—	—	—	10	—	8	—	BPI: Platinum	Wordshaker
"Missing You"	2010	3	—	—	—	6	—	2	—	BPI: Silver	Headlines!
"Higher" (featuring Flo Rida)	2010	10	—	—	—	11	—	9	—	BPI: Platinum	Headlines!
"Notorious"	2011	8	—	—	—	19	—	8	—	BPI: Silver	On Your Radar
"All Fired Up"	2011	3	—	—	—	6	—	3	—	BPI: Gold	On Your Radar
"My Heart Takes Over"	2011	15	—	—	—	31	—	8	—		On Your Radar
"30 Days"	2012	7	—	—	—	13	—	2	—		Living for the Weekend
"What About Us" (featuring Sean Paul)	2012	1	14	79	44	6	27	1	27	BPI: Platinum; RMNZ: Gold	Living for the Weekend
"Gentleman"	2013	14	—	—	—	28	—	10	—		Living for the Weekend
"Disco Love"	2013	5	—	—	—	9	—	4	—	BPI: Silver	Living for the Weekend
"Not Giving Up"	2014	19	—	—	—	26	—	15	—		Living for the Weekend
"What Are You Waiting For?"	2014	38	—	—	—	89	—	12	—		Finest Selection: The Greatest Hits
"—" denotes releases that did not chart or were not released in that territory.

== Guest appearances ==
These songs have not appeared on a studio album or a single released by The Saturdays.

Song	Year	Album
"Ego (Live from BBC Radio 1's Live Lounge)"	2010	Radio 1's Live Lounge, Vol. 5
"I Need a Dollar"	2011	Radio 1's Live Lounge, Vol. 6
"Please Mr. Postman"	2014	Postman Pat: The Movie OST
"Christmas Wrapping"	2014	Get Santa (Original Motion Picture Soundtrack)
"Winter Wonderland (Live at the BBC)"	2018	The Sound of Christmas: Live & Exclusive at the BBC

== Videography ==
=== Video albums ===
List of albums
Title	Album details	Notes
Headlines! Live from the Hammersmith Apollo	Released: 21 November 2011; Label: Universal; Format: DVD	Live concert filmed at Hammersmith Apollo, in 2011. Released as part of the "On Your Radar" Deluxe boxset.
The Videos	Released: 11 August 2014; Label: Polydor; Format: DVD	All music videos. Released as part of the "Finest Selection: The Greatest Hits" Super Deluxe boxset.

=== Music videos ===
List of videos, showing year released and director
Title	Year	Director(s)
"If This Is Love"	2008	Harvey B Brown
"Up"	2008	Harvey B Brown
"Issues"	2009	Petro
"Just Can't Get Enough"	2009	Harvey B Brown
"Work"	2009	J.T
"Forever Is Over"	2009	Trudy Bellinger
"Ego"	2010	Mike Simpson & Robin Van Calcar
"Missing You"	2010	Chris Cottam
"Higher"	2010	Taylor Cohen
"Higher" (featuring Flo Rida)	2010	Taylor Cohen
"Notorious"	2011	Syndrome
"All Fired Up"	2011	Ryan Hope
"My Heart Takes Over"	2011	Elisha Smith-Leverock
"30 Days"	2012	Taylor Cohen
"What About Us"	2013	Sarah Chatfield
"What About Us" (featuring Sean Paul)	2013	Sarah Chatfield
"Gentleman"	2013	Trudy Bellinger
"Disco Love"	2013	Carly Cussen
"Not Giving Up"	2014	Chris Sweeny
"What Are You Waiting For?"	2014	Sarah Chatfield
