= List of songs recorded by the Saturdays =

This is a list of all the songs sung and performed by English-Irish pop girl-group the Saturdays.

The list consists of all songs which have been released on the group's albums: Chasing Lights (2008), Wordshaker (2009), Headlines! (2010), On Your Radar (2011) and Living for the Weekend (2013). The list also includes the B-sides, which the band have released with their singles. To-date there have been eighteen singles and nineteen B-side singles. Cover versions of songs which the band have done and live covers which the band have performed at various places (e.g. on their tour) have also been listed. The band have so far sold over 6 million records in the United Kingdom alone.

== Original songs ==
Title	Album	Year
"2 a.m."	Wordshaker	2009
"30 Days"	Living for the Weekend and Finest Selection: The Greatest Hits	2012
"808"	Finest Selection: The Greatest Hits	2014
"All Fired Up"	On Your Radar and Finest Selection: The Greatest Hits	2011
"Anywhere with You"	Living for the Weekend	2013
"Bigger"	"Not Giving Up" (B-side)	2014
"Chasing Lights"	Chasing Lights	2008
"Deeper"	Wordshaker and Headlines!	2009
"Denial"	Wordshaker	2009
"Disco Love"	Living for the Weekend and Finest Selection: The Greatest Hits	2013
"Do What You Want with Me"	On Your Radar	2011
"Don't Let Me Dance Alone"	Living for the Weekend	2013
"Ego"	Wordshaker, Headlines! and Finest Selection: The Greatest Hits	2009
"Fall"	Chasing Lights	2009
"Faster"	On Your Radar	2011
"Flashback"	"Ego" (B-side)	2009
"Forever Is Over"	Wordshaker, Headlines! and Finest Selection: The Greatest Hits	2009
"For Myself"	On Your Radar	2011
"Get Ready, Get Set"	On Your Radar	2011
"Gentleman"	Living for the Weekend and Finest Selection: The Greatest Hits	2013
"Girls Night Out"	Unreleased	- -
"Golden Rules"	"Just Can't Get Enough" (B-side)	2009
"Gypsy Eyes"	Unreleased	- -
"Hell Yeah"	Unreleased	2008
"Here Standing"	Wordshaker and Headlines!	2009
"Higher"^{[A]}	Headlines! and Finest Selection: The Greatest Hits	2010
"I Can't Wait"	"Forever Is Over" (B-side)	2009
"If This Is Love"	Chasing Lights and Finest Selection: The Greatest Hits	2008
"I Say OK"	On Your Radar	2011
"Issues"	Chasing Lights and Finest Selection: The Greatest Hits	2008
"Karma"	Headlines!	2010
"Keep Her"	Chasing Lights	2008
"King"	Unreleased	- -
"Ladykiller"	"All Fired Up" (B-side)	2011
"Last Call"	On Your Radar	2011
"Lease My Love"	Living for the Weekend	2013
"Leave a Light On"	Living for the Weekend	2013
"Lies"	Chasing Lights	2009
"Lose Control"	Wordshaker and Headlines!	2009
"Missing You"	Headlines! and Finest Selection: The Greatest Hits	2010
"Move on U"	On Your Radar	2011
"My Heart Takes Over"	On Your Radar and Finest Selection: The Greatest Hits	2011
"No One"	Wordshaker	2009
"Not Giving Up"	Living for the Weekend and Finest Selection: The Greatest Hits	2013
"Not Good Enough"	Wordshaker	2009
"Notorious"	On Your Radar and Finest Selection: The Greatest Hits	2011
"Not That Kinda Girl"	"Notorious" (B-side)	2011
"One Shot"	Wordshaker and Headlines!	2009
"Open Up"	Wordshaker	2009
"Promise Me"	On Your Radar	2011
"Puppet"	Headlines!	2010
"Ready to Rise"	"Missing You" (B-side)	2010
"Set Me Off"	Chasing Lights	2008
"So Stupid"	"My Heart Takes Over" (B-side)	2011
"Somebody Else's Life"	"What About Us" (acoustic B-side) and Living for the Weekend	2013
"The Problem with Love"	Living for the Weekend	2013
"The Thief"	Unreleased	- -
"The Way You Watch Me"^{[B]}	On Your Radar	2011
"Today"	"Unreleased"	- -
"Turn Myself In"	"30 Days" (B-side) and deleted from On Your Radar	2012
"Unofficial"	"Work" (B-side)	2009
"Up"	Chasing Lights and Finest Selection: The Greatest Hits	2008
"Vulnerable"	Chasing Lights	2008
"Walking Through the Desert"	Finest Selection: The Greatest Hits	2014
"What About Us"^{[C]}	Living for the Weekend and Finest Selection: The Greatest Hits	2013
"What Are You Waiting For?"	Finest Selection: The Greatest Hits	2014
"What Am I Gonna Do?"	"If This Is Love" (B-side)	2008
"White Lies"	On Your Radar	2011
"Why Me, Why Now"	Chasing Lights	2008
"Wildfire"	"Gentleman" (B-side) and Living for the Weekend	2013
"Wish I Didn't Know"	On Your Radar	2011
"Wordshaker"	Wordshaker	2009
"Work"	Chasing Lights and Finest Selection: The Greatest Hits	2008
"You Don't Have the Right"	Living for the Weekend	2013

== Covers ==
Title	Album	Original artist	Year
"Beggin'"	"Issues" (B-side)	The Four Seasons	2009
"Crashing Down"	"Up" (B-side)	The Nolans	2008
"Died in Your Eyes"	Headlines!	Kristinia DeBarge	2010
"Had It with Today"	"Higher" (B-side)	Una Healy	2010
"I Need a Dollar"	BBC Radio 1's Live Lounge, Volume 6	Aloe Blacc	2011
"Just Can't Get Enough"	Chasing Lights	Depeche Mode	2009
"Love Come Down"	"Disco Love" (B-side)	Evelyn King	2013
"On the Radio"	"Disco Love" (B-side)	Donna Summer	2013
"Please Mr. Postman"	Postman Pat: The Movie OST	The Marvelettes	2014
"When Love Takes Over"	"What Are You Waiting For" (B-side)	David Guetta	2014

== Live songs ==
- "Shut Up and Drive", Rihanna / "I Kissed a Girl", Katy Perry / "So What", Pink – The Work Tour & V Festival, 2009
- "Love the Way You Lie" / "What's My Name?" / "Only Girl (In the World), Rihanna – Headlines Tour, 2010
- "Just the Way You Are", Bruno Mars – Live Lounge, 2010
- "Winter Wonderland" – Live Lounge and the All Fired Up! tour, 2010
- "Baby", Justin Bieber – The Saturdays: 24/7, 2010
- "Moves like Jagger", Maroon 5 – All Fired Up! tour, 2011
- "Call Me Maybe", Carly Rae Jepsen – Summer Festivals 2012
- "Hold On, We're Going Home", Drake / "No Scrubs", TLC / "Survivor", Destiny's Child – Live Lounge, 2013

== See also ==
- The Saturdays discography
- Polydor Records
- Fascination Records

== Notes ==
- A This song also features Flo Rida.
- B This song also features Travie McCoy.
- C This song also features Sean Paul.
