= Greatest Hits Live! (tour) =

2014 concert tour by the Saturdays

- Tour by The Saturdays
- Associated album: Finest Selection: The Greatest Hits
- Start date: 7 September 2014
- End date: 23 September 2014
- No. of shows: 12 in Europe

The Saturdays concert chronology
- All Fired Up! (2011); Greatest Hits Live! (2014)

Greatest Hits Live! (also known as the Finest Selection Tour) was the fourth and final headlining concert tour by English-Irish girl group The Saturdays. It was their first tour in three years, launched in support of their greatest hits album, Finest Selection: The Greatest Hits.

== Background ==
Just a few months after releasing their fourth studio album Living for the Weekend (2013), the group announced they would release a greatest hits album and tour in support of the album. The album, Finest Selection: The Greatest Hits, was announced for release in August 2014 and was described as including the group's previous Top 40 singles along with three new tracks. The tour was announced as a 12-date run in support of the album. The tour was the group's first in three years.

The tour played a mixture of theatres and arenas with most dates sold out at full capacity. The largest attendance for a single show was Wembley Arena, London with almost 10,000 in attendance. During the Glasgow show, Frankie Bridge had a pre-recorded segment to show she was competing on the twelfth season of Strictly Come Dancing that would start airing three days after the tour completed.

== Setlist ==
The following set list is representative of the show on 7 September 2014. It is not representative of all concerts for the duration of the tour.

1. "What Are You Waiting For?"
2. "Up"
3. "808"
4. "Work"
5. "Forever Is Over"
6. "Higher"
7. "Gentleman"
8. "Just Can't Get Enough"
9. "My Heart Takes Over"
10. "Disco Love" (with incorporation of "Stayin' Alive" and "...Baby One More Time")
11. "30 Days" / "Wildfire" / "Get Ready, Get Set" / "One Shot" / "Don't Let Me Dance Alone" / "Missing You"
12. "Not Giving Up"
13. "If This Is Love"
14. "Notorious"
15. "Walking Through The Desert"
16. "Ego"
17. "Chasing Lights"
18. "Issues"
19. "All Fired Up"
20. "What About Us"

== Tour dates ==
Date	City	Country	Venue
Europe
7 September 2014	Glasgow	Scotland	Clyde Auditorium
9 September 2014	Newcastle	England	Newcastle City Hall
10 September 2014	Sheffield	England	Sheffield City Hall
12 September 2014	Nottingham	England	Nottingham Royal Concert Hall
14 September 2014	Manchester	England	O2 Apollo Manchester
15 September 2014	Birmingham	England	National Indoor Arena
17 September 2014	Dublin	Ireland	Olympia Theatre
18 September 2014	Cardiff	Wales	Motorpoint Arena Cardiff
19 September 2014	London	England	Wembley Arena
20 September 2014	Brighton	England	Brighton Centre
22 September 2014	Bournemouth	England	Bournemouth International Centre
23 September 2014	Plymouth	England	Plymouth Pavilions

=== Box office score data ===
Venue	City	Tickets Sold
Clyde Auditorium	Glasgow	2,550 / 2,550
City Hall	Newcastle	2,135 / 2,135
City Hall	Sheffield	2,271 / 2,271
Royal Concert Hall	Nottingham	2,499 / 2,499
O2 Apollo	Manchester	2,693 / 2,693
National Indoor Arena	Birmingham	4,370 / 4,500
Olympia	Dublin	1,240 / 1,240
Motorpoint Arena	Cardiff	5,000 / 5,000
Wembley Arena	London	9,563 / 10,900
Centre	Brighton	4,500 / 4,500
International Centre	Bournemouth	3,640 / 4,100
Pavilions	Plymouth	4,000 / 4,000
TOTAL		44,461 / 46,388
