= Vanessa White =

English singer (born 1989)

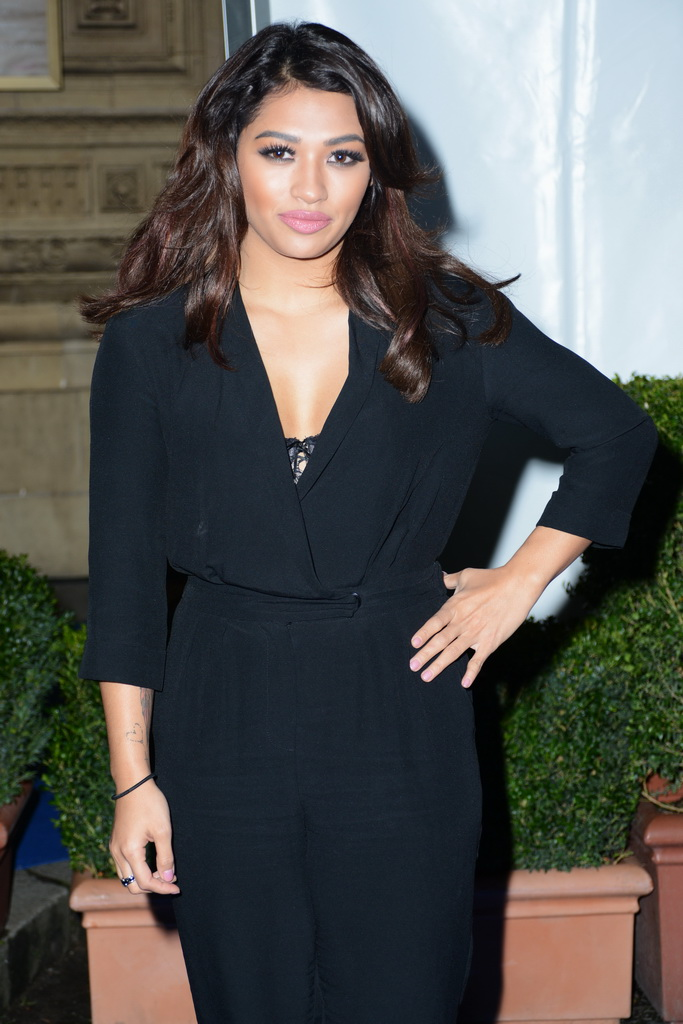
- White at the Royal Albert Hall in 2014
- Born: Vanessa Karen White; 30 October 1989 (age 36); Yeovil, Somerset, England
- Occupations: Singer; dancer
- Musical career
- Genres: R&B; pop; dance-pop; soul
- Years active: 2007–present
- Labels: Polydor; Interscope
- Formerly of: The Saturdays

Vanessa Karen White (born 30 October 1989) is an English singer who rose to fame in 2008 as a singer in the girl group The Saturdays. White began her career as a theatre actress at an early age, appearing in several West End productions. She played Young Nala in The Lion King and between 2000 and 2002, she was cast as one of the King's daughters in The King and I. White successfully auditioned for The Saturdays in 2007, after a period attempting to carve out a solo singing career. Once White had joined the group, they began recording music and releasing a number of hits. The group later gained another record deal with Geffen Records after having huge success in the United Kingdom. White and the rest of the group then signed a deal with Island Def Jam Records and Mercury Records to distribute their music in the United States, which led to their first UK number-one single "What About Us". White's vocal range has been compared to Christina Aguilera and Mariah Carey. White is the youngest member of the group.

While still remaining a member of The Saturdays, White began to pursue music projects outside the group, firstly featuring on a number of songs by Master Shortie and Vince Kidd's "The Zoo". When The Saturdays decided to take a hiatus in 2014 after completing their Greatest Hits Live! tour, White decided to record her own solo music, recording with the likes of Wretch 32. She has released two Extended plays Chapter One and Chapter Two. White has appeared in a number of successful reality television shows, including Chasing the Saturdays (2013), The Saturdays: 24/7 (2011) and Ghosthunting With... The Saturdays (2010). As an individual, she also participated as a contestant in the first series of Popstar to Operastar and the seventeenth series of I'm a Celebrity...Get Me Out of Here.

== Life and career ==
=== Early life and career beginnings ===
Vanessa White was born on 30 October 1989 and grew up with two younger siblings, a brother, Ryan and sister, Celine. White enrolled at the Sylvia Young Theatre School based in West London where she was chosen for West End theatre productions, including The Lion King and The King and I. When she was 13, she also appeared on the kids version of Stars in Their Eyes in 2003, performing as Beyoncé.

=== 2007–2014: The Saturdays ===
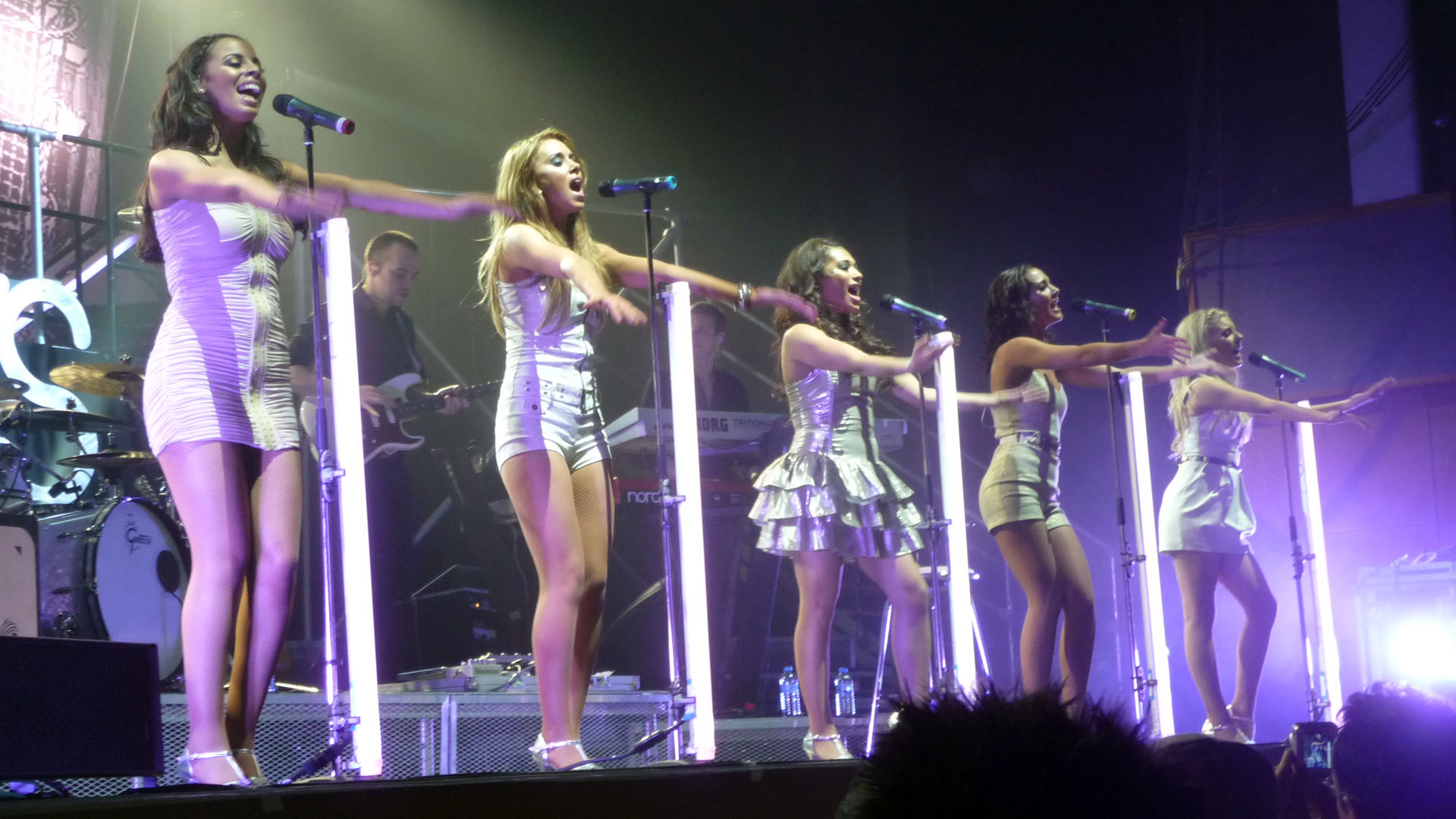
The Saturdays onstage, 2009

Since 2007, White has been a member of girl group The Saturdays. As of October 2017, the group has achieved thirteen Top 10 hits, and five Top 10 albums. The Saturdays released their debut single "If This Is Love" in July 2008. It peaked at number eight in the UK. The group subsequently released a follow-up single "Up", which charted at number five in the UK and later earned a Silver Disc in the United Kingdom. In late October 2008, the group released their first studio album Chasing Lights. White, who is known for her powerful voice and is referred to by other members of the band as "our Christina Aguilera" due to her extensive vocal range, is the only member of The Saturdays to have a solo part on every track of their debut album. She has also received comparison to American singers Alicia Keys, Beyoncé and Mariah Carey. Chasing Lights charted at number nine in the UK, and went Platinum according to the BPI. The band released a third single from the album, "Issues", which also went Silver, followed by a cover of "Just Can't Get Enough", originally recorded by Depeche Mode. The song debuted at number two in the UK, behind Flo Rida's "Right Round". The fifth and final single from the album was "Work", which was the first single by the group to fail to reach the top 20. The group later went on a UK tour titled The Work Tour. On the Dundee leg of The Work Tour, White was about to go on stage when she tripped over a cable backstage and tore a ligament in her ankle, forcing her to miss a large proportion of the show that night. Once paramedics had strapped up her foot, she was permitted to join the group on stage in a wheelchair. White appeared on stage in the next few shows sitting on a bar stool and gradually began to stand for more and more songs as the tour progressed. In October 2009, the group released a second studio album, Wordshaker, which charted at number nine and was given a silver certification by the BPI. The first single from the album, "Forever Is Over", charted at number two in the UK. The Saturdays were by now appearing in advertisements for several products including a brand of deodorant, tampons, mobile phones, an operating system, and hair removal products. In early 2010, the girls released a second and final single from their second album, "Ego", which charted at number nine, the single gained a certification of Silver by the BPI.

In summer 2010, the Saturdays released their first mini album (their third album overall) Headlines!, which charted at number 3 in the UK and number 10 in Ireland. The band released their eighth single, "Missing You", which charted at number three in the UK and number six in Ireland. Band member Rochelle Wiseman confirmed that the second single from the album would be "Higher" It was later confirmed by the band's official website that Flo Rida had recorded vocals for "Higher". On Your Radar was the girls' third studio album, reaching a disappointing number 23 in the UK and spending only three weeks in the UK Top 75, but featured the top-ten hits, "All Fired Up" and "Notorious" as well as single, "My Heart Takes Over". In December 2011, the group went on their first headlining arena tour, the All Fired Up Tour! The first single from their fourth studio album "30 Days", which was released in May 2012, peaked at number seven. Later in the year, they temporarily moved from London to Los Angeles in the hope of breaking America. To help increase their single sales in America, E! Network broadcast Chasing The Saturdays, a reality TV show following the girls during their three-month stay in America. The show premiered in January 2013 but was cancelled after one series. The band released "What About Us" (featuring rapper Sean Paul) in March 2013, which became their first number one single and was the biggest selling single of the year (at that point). Later on in the year, "Gentleman" and "Disco Love" were released; with both of them charting in the top 15. Their album Living for the Weekend became the band's fourth top ten album. The final single taken from the album was a fan favourite. The radio mix of "Not Giving Up" was released in April 2014 and was their seventeenth top 40 single. The band went on hiatus in 2014, and released a greatest hits album Finest Selection: The Greatest Hits the same year. The only single released from the album, "What Are You Waiting For?" charted at number thirty-seven, making it their lowest-charting single to date.

=== 2015–present: Chapter One and Two ===
On 21 September 2015, White released her first solo track entitled "Relationship Goals." The song was intended as a preview of her solo album which was scheduled to follow in 2016, but failed to surface. On 13 November 2015, she released her official debut single, "Don't Want to Be Your Lover", with the music video for the song released on the same day. On 7 January 2016 she released a music video for new track "Nostalgia," and announced that it, alongside her two previously released tracks, would be included on her debut EP, Chapter One. The EP was released on 19 February 2016 and was followed by another promotional single, "Lipstick Kisses". On 8 September 2016, she released a new single, "Low Key". Her second solo EP, Chapter Two, was released on 31 March 2017; preceded by singles "Good Good" and "Running Wild".

== Television work ==
White appeared in a number of reality television shows including Ghosthunting With... The Saturdays in 2010, The Saturdays: 24/7 in 2011 and Chasing the Saturdays in 2013.

In January 2010, White participated in the first series of the ITV celebrity reality television programme Popstar to Operastar. She was the second contestant eliminated, on 22 January.

In November 2017, White was confirmed as a participant on the seventeenth series of I'm a Celebrity...Get Me Out of Here!. She was the fourth to be eliminated and finished in eighth place on 5 December 2017.

In 2018, she participated in E4 show, All Star Driving School.

== Personal life ==
Vanessa began dating menswear stylist Gary Salter in 2011. They ended their relationship in April 2017. In November 2025, she announced her pregnancy with her first child, as well as her engagement to partner Emmanuel Lawal.

== Discography ==
=== Extended plays ===
List of extended plays
Title	Album details
Chapter One	Released: 19 February 2016; Label: Karma Artist Recordings; Formats: Digital download
Chapter Two	Released: 31 March 2017; Label: Salute The Sun Records; Formats: Digital download

=== As lead artist ===
List of singles as lead artist
Title	Year	Peak chart positions	Album
Title	Year	UK	Album
"Relationship Goals" (featuring Chloe Martini)	2015	—	Chapter One
"Don't Wanna Be Your Lover" (featuring Nick Brewer)	2015	—	Chapter One
"Nostalgia" (featuring Wretch 32)	2016	—	Chapter One
"Lipstick Kises" (featuring Wretch 32)	2016	—	Chapter One
"Low Key" (featuring Illa J)	2016	—	non-album single
"Good Good"	2017	—	Chapter Two
"Running Wild"	2017	—	Chapter Two
"Boy 4 Life"	2023	—	TBA

=== As featured artist ===
List of singles as featured artist
Single	Year	Peak chart positions	Album
Single	Year	UK	Album
"Swagger Chick" (Master Shortie featuring Vanessa White)	2009	—	A.D.H.D
"The Zoo" (Vince Kidd featuring Vanessa White)	2013	—	Oddball
"Faking It" (Chloe Martini featuring Vanessa White)	2017	—	Never Twice The Same
"Rotation" (Gearsluts featuring Vanessa White)	2018	—	Geared Up – EP

=== Music videos ===
Single	Year	Featured	Director
"The Zoo"	2013	Vince Kidd	Katia Ganfield
"Relationship Goals"	2015	—	Aaron Renfree
"Don't Want to Be Your Lover"	2015	—	—N/a
"Nostalgia"	2016	—	—N/a
"Lipstick Kisses"	2016	Wretch 32	—N/a
