= Finest Selection: The Greatest Hits =

2014 compilation album by The Saturdays

Greatest hits album by the Saturdays
- Released: 11 August 2014
- Recorded: 2008–2014
- Genre: Pop
- Length: 67:07
- Label: Polydor

The Saturdays chronology
Living for the Weekend (2013)	Finest Selection: The Greatest Hits (2014)

Singles from Finest Selection: The Greatest Hits
- 1. "What Are You Waiting For?" Released: 10 August 2014

Finest Selection: The Greatest Hits is the first greatest hits album and final release by British-Irish girl group the Saturdays. It was released on 11 August 2014, through Polydor Records. The album includes all 17 of their singles released from the albums Chasing Lights (2008), Wordshaker (2009), Headlines! (2010), On Your Radar (2011) and Living for the Weekend (2013) as well as three new songs, "What Are You Waiting For?", "808" and "Walking Through the Desert".

Upon release, debuted at number ten on the UK Albums Chart, giving The Saturdays their fifth top-ten album in the UK. The album spent four weeks inside the UK Top 100. To date, it is the last release from the group who went on hiatus in 2014.

== Singles ==
"What Are You Waiting For?" was released on 10 August 2014, as the album's lead single.

== Track listing ==
Standard edition / Disc 1
No.	Title	Writer(s)	Producer(s)	Length
1.	"What About Us" (featuring Sean Paul) (from Living for the Weekend and Chasing the Saturdays)	Camille Purcell; Ollie Jacobs; Philip Jacobs; Sean Henriques	Art Bastian; James F. Reynolds^{[a]}; Sam Kempler^{[b]}; Jason "jigzagula" Henriques^{[c]}; Paul^{[c]}	3:41
2.	"Higher" (featuring Flo Rida) (from Headlines!)	Arnthor Birgisson; Ina Wroldsen	Arnthor	3:18
3.	"Ego" (from Wordshaker)	Steve Mac; Wroldsen	Mac	3:03
4.	"All Fired Up" (from On Your Radar)	Annie Yuill; Brian Higgins; Eliza Dodd-Noble; Tim Deal; Jason Resch; Uzoechi Emenike; Matt Gray; Miranda Cooper; Nick Dresti	Xenomania; Brian Higgins	3:12
5.	"What Are You Waiting For?" (previously unreleased)	Higgins; Carla Marie Williams; Florence Arnald; Gavin Harris; Deal; Luke Fitton; Emenike; Gray; Cooper; Nicholas Hill; Toby Scott; Ebba Tove Nilsson	Xenomania; Harris^{[a]}; Hill^{[a]}	3:25
6.	"Up" (single mix) (from Chasing Lights)	Josef Larossi; Andreas Romdhane; Wroldsen	Quiz & Larossi; Fiasco^{[a]}; Jeremy Wheatley^{[a]}	3:24
7.	"Forever Is Over" (radio edit) (from Wordshaker)	James Bourne; Louis Biancaniello; Sam Watters	Biancaniello; Watters	3:24
8.	"Issues" (radio mix) (from Chasing Lights)	Carl Sturken; Evan Rogers	Sturken; Rogers; Wheatley^{[a]}; Rob Heselden^{[b]}	3:35
9.	"Disco Love" (from Living for the Weekend)	Adam Klein; Pálmi Ragnar Ásgeirsson; Saethór Kristjánsson; Ásgeir Orri Ásgeirsson	StopWaitGo Productions	3:14
10.	"Notorious" (from On Your Radar)	Wroldsen; Mac	Mac	3:11
11.	"Missing You" (from Headlines!)	Alexander Kronlund; Lukas Hilbert	Hilbert; Reynolds^{[a]}	3:41
12.	"Work" (Phil Tan Radio Mix) (from Chasing Lights)	Harry Sommerdahl; Wroldsen; Kalle Engström	Sommerdahl; Engström	3:13
13.	"Not Giving Up" (radio mix) (from Living for the Weekend)	Anthony Egizii; Carl Ryden; Williams; Celetia Martin; David Musumeci	Ryden	3:19
14.	"30 Days" (from Living for the Weekend)	Autumn Rowe; Mac	Mac	3:04
15.	"808" (previously unreleased)	Purcell; George Tizzard; Rick Parkhouse	Red Triangle Productions	3:12
16.	"Gentleman" (from Living for the Weekend)	Priscilla Renea; Scott Effman	Ambience; GhostTrack^{[a]}; Renea^{[c]}	3:40
17.	"If This Is Love" (radio edit) (from Chasing Lights)	Alison Moyet; Wroldsen; Joe Belmaati; John Reid; Mich Hansen; Remee; Vince Clarke	Cutfather; Belmaati	2:56
18.	"Walking Through the Desert" (previously unreleased)	Chelcee Grimes; Phil Cook	Cook; Reynolds^{[a]}; Klempner^{[b]}	3:22
19.	"My Heart Takes Over" (from On Your Radar)	Wroldsen; Mac	Mac	4:06
20.	"Just Can't Get Enough" (Radio Mix) from Chasing Lights)	Clarke	David Eriksen	3:07
Total length:				67:07

Deluxe edition bonus tracks and Super deluxe edition disc 2
No.	Title	Length
21.	"Not That Kinda Girl" (from "Notorious")	3:09
22.	"Flashback" (from "Ego")	3:13
23.	"Wildfire" (from "Gentleman")	3:37
24.	"Beggin'" (from "Issues")	3:09
25.	"Turn Myself In" (from "30 Days")	3:35
26.	"Love Come Down" (from "Disco Love")	3:32
27.	"Ladykiller" (from "All Fired Up")	3:20
28.	"I Can't Wait" (from "Forever Is Over")	3:43
29.	"Somebody Else's Life" (acoustic) (from "What About Us")	3:16
30.	"Had It with Today" (from "Higher")	3:15
31.	"Ready to Rise" (from "Missing You")	3:33
32.	"So Stupid" (from "My Heart Takes Over")	3:23
33.	"What Am I Gonna Do" (from "If This Is Love")	3:16
34.	"On the Radio" (from "Disco Love")	3:52
35.	"Unofficial" (from "Work")	3:53
36.	"Golden Rules" (from "Just Can't Get Enough")	3:50
37.	"Bigger" (from "Not Giving Up")	2:51
38.	"Crashing Down" (from "Up")	3:10
39.	"When Love Takes Over" (from "What Are You Waiting For?")	3:51

Super deluxe edition DVD
No.	Title	Director(s)	Length
1.	"If This Is Love"	Harvey B Brown
2.	"Up"	Brown
3.	"Issues"	Petro
4.	"Just Can't Get Enough"	Brown
5.	"Work" (Phil Tan Radio Mix)	J.T.
6.	"Forever Is Over"	Trudy Bellinger
7.	"Ego"	Mike Simpson; Robin Van Calcar
8.	"Missing You"	Chris Cottam
9.	"Higher" (featuring Flo Rida)	Taylor Cohen
10.	"Notorious"	Syndrome
11.	"All Fired Up"	Ryan Hope
12.	"My Heart Takes Over"	Elisha Smith-Leverock
13.	"30 Days"	Cohen
14.	"What About Us" (featuring Sean Paul)	Sarah Chatfield
15.	"Gentlemen"	Bellinger
16.	"Disco Love"	Carly Cussen
17.	"Not Giving Up"	Chris Sweeny
18.	"What Are You Waiting For?"	Chatfield

=== Notes ===
- ^{^[a]} denotes additional production by
- ^{^[b]} denotes assistant production by
- ^{^[c]} denotes vocal production by

== Charts and certifications ==
=== Charts ===
Chart performance for Finest Selection: The Greatest Hits
Chart (2014)	Peak position
Irish Albums (IRMA)	32
Scottish Albums (Official Charts)	9
UK Albums (Official Charts)	10

=== Certifications ===
Certifications for Finest Selection: The Greatest Hits
Region	Certification	Certified units/sales
United Kingdom (BPI)	Gold	100,000^{‡}
^{‡} Sales+streaming figures based on certification alone.

== Release history ==
Release history and formats for Finest Selection: The Greatest Hits
Region	Date	Format(s)	Label	Ref.
Japan	8 August 2014	Digital download	Universal Music	
Spain	8 August 2014	Digital download	Universal Music	
Ireland	8 August 2014	CD; digital download	Polydor	
United Kingdom	11 August 2014	CD; CD+DVD; digital download	Polydor	
Germany	15 August 2014	CD; digital download	Polydor	
