= Somebody Else's Life =

Song by The Saturdays

from the album Living for the Weekend
- Recorded: 2012
- Genre: Dance-pop
- Length: 2:52
- Label: Fascination; Polydor; Island Def Jam
- Songwriters: Una Healy; Mollie King; Frankie Bridge; Rochelle Humes; Vanessa White; Charlie Holmes; Lucie Silvas; Judie Tzuke
- Producer: Holmes

"Somebody Else's Life" is a song recorded by British-Irish girl group the Saturdays for their fourth studio album (fifth overall), Living for the Weekend (2013). The song was written by band members Una Healy, Frankie Bridge, Rochelle Humes, Vanessa White and Mollie King as well as Lucie Silvas, Judie Tzuke and Charlie Holmes co-writing the song with the band members. The song's genre is dance-pop. When creating the song, the band wanted to create something "amazing", "crazy" and "very pop". The song was chosen to be the opening theme for the band's reality television show Chasing the Saturdays.

== Background and recording ==
"Somebody Else's life was the first song recorded when the band arrived in the United States to record their fourth studio album, Living for the Weekend. The band said they were looking to go back to their "roots" with the song and record a song which related to their first studio album, Chasing Lights (2008). They were looking to great a song that was "amazing", "crazy" and "very pop" like they were known for back in their native, the United Kingdom. In late October 2012, it was revealed to the public that the Saturdays were in talks to feature in their own reality television programme, which they had already done previously with The Saturdays: 24/7 broadcast through ITV2. It was later revealed that American television network, E! were interested in showing their show programme. It was announced that they did sign a contract with the network and Chasing the Saturdays would be broadcast through E! internationally. It was later revealed that the band had signed a joint record deal with Island Def Jam Records and Mercury Records, with a view to releasing future material internationally mainly the United States and Canada. While the band were filming their reality television in United States the band began working on new music and collaborating with a number of producers. "Somebody Else's Life is the opening theme for the band's reality show Chasing the Saturdays.

== Commercial performance ==
After the release of Living for the Weekend, "Somebody Else's Life" debuted on Official Charts Company UK Singles Chart at number 94, becoming the Saturdays twenty-third top 100 on the chart.

== Live performance ==
"Somebody Else's Life" was included on the set list of The Greatest Hits! Live Tour. During their Chasing the Saturdays row, the band performed the song to Island Def Jam and Mercury Records executives, which led to them signing a US record deal.

== Charts ==
Chart (2013)	Peak position
Euro Digital Songs (Billboard)	85
Scottish Singles Sales (Official Charts)	71
UK Singles (Official Charts)	94
