= Lukas Nathanson =

Swedish record producer, composer and songwriter

- Also known as: Nate
- Origin: Stockholm, Sweden
- Genres: Pop; Hip hop; electronic
- Occupation(s): Composer, record producer
- Instrument(s): Piano, Drums, Keyboards

Lukas Nathanson (born 4 July 1986) is a Swedish record producer, composer and songwriter. He is commonly known for collaborating with producers Scott Effman, Kenneth Coby as well as various artists including Akon, Chris Brown, Natalia Jiménez, Sofia Reyes, and Prince Royce. Nathanson was nominated for two Grammy Awards for his work on the albums Creo En Mi by Natalia Jiménez and X by Chris Brown.

== Career ==
Nathanson started producing music in Stockholm, Sweden and signed his first publishing deal at age 16 with reactive songs. In his early career, he has worked with Finnish rapper Pikku G, Cuban band Alianza and Japanese idol group Arashi. In 2012, Nathanson moved to the Los Angeles, where he started collaborating with writers and producers at recording studios. He later began a production duo with Scott Effman and worked with artists in various genres, including Akon, Chris Brown, Boyz II Men, The Saturdays, Priscilla Renea, and Prince Royce. In 2014, Nathanson received a Grammy nomination for Chris Brown's X as the best urban contemporary album. In 2015, he received another Latin Grammy nomination for his work on Natalia Jimenez's album Creole en Mi. Lukas competed in Melodifestivalen with Vlad Reiser's ”Nakna I Regnet” in 2019 and with OVÖ's "Inga Problem" in 2020.

== Production discography ==
Title	Year	Artist(s)	Album	Credits
"Seres Humanos"	2005	Alianza	Modern Ruin	Writing and Production
"What Comes Up" (feat. Royce da 5'9")	2005	Yor123 & Skandaali	Round The World	Writing and Production
"You Know"	2005	Yor123 & Skandaali	Round The World	Writing and Production
"Swischa Förbi"	2009	Lorentz & M.Sakarias	Vi Mot Världen	Writing and Production
"La Familia"	2009	Arashi	-	Writing and production
"Hungover"	2011	Honey	Honey	Writing and Production
"Runaway"	2011	Honey	Honey	Writing and Production
"Outta Control"	2011	Danzel	Outta Control	Writing and Production
"Walked Away"	2011	Masspike Miles	-	Writing and Production
"Gentleman"	2013	The Saturdays	Living for the Weekend	Composer, Drums, Keyboards, Programming
"Rainbow"	2013	Namie Amuro	Feel	Writing
"Breakdown"	2013	Akon	-	Writing and production
" Dame Tu Amor" (feat. Pitbull)	2013	Pee Wee	Vive2Life	Writing and production
"Gentleman"	2014	The Saturdays	Finest Selection: The Greatest Hits	Composer, Drums, Keyboards, Programming
"101 (Interlude)"	2014	Chris Brown	X	Composer
"Another Heartbreak"	2014	Abraham Mateo	Who I AM	Writing
"Collide"	2014	Boyz II Men	Collide	Writing and production
"Each His Own"	2014	Akon	Singles	Writing and Production
"Until Then "	2014	East	Old Age	Writing
"Soul"	2014	Girls' Generation	Mr.Mr.	Writing
"The Rest of Time"	2014	Jacky Cheung	Wake Up Dreaming	Writing
"Escapar"	2015	Natalia Jiménez	Creo en Mi	Writing and production
"Angeles Caídos"	2015	Natalia Jiménez	Creo en Mi	Writing and production
"I Miss Music"	2015	Monica	Code Red	Writing and production
"Basta"	2015	Edurne	Adrenalina	Writing
"Rakkaudesta lajiin" (feat. Eevil Stöö)	2016	Evelina	24K	Writing
"Make Me Feel" (feat. Nicki Minaj)	2016	Akon	-	Writing and Production
"Blind Woman"	2016	Aurea	-	Writing
"Solo Yo" (with Prince Royce)	2017	Sofia Reyes	Louder!	Writing and production
"Nobody But Me" (with Prince Royce)	2017	Sofia Reyes	Louder!	Writing and production
"Louder!" (feat. Francesco Yates & Spencer Ludwig)	2017	Sofia Reyes	Louder!	Producer
"Älskar Din Vibe"	2019	OVÖ	-	Writing and Production
"Kvicksand"	2019	OVÖ	-	Writing and Production
"Rise Up"	2019	Mapei	-	Production
"Another Side"	2019	Matisse & Sadko, Robert Falcon, Wrabel	-	Writing
"Nakna I Regnet"	2019	Vlad Reiser	-	Writing and Production
"inga Problem"	2020	OVÖ	-	Writing and Production
"Escape"	2020	Akon & Wizkid	-	Writing and Production
"Heroine (Let’s Stay Together)"	-	Justin Bieber	-	Writing
"Hush"	-	Meghan Trainor	-	Writing and Production
