= Chasing the Saturdays (EP) =

EP by the Saturdays
- Released: 27 January 2013
- Recorded: 2009–2012
- Genres: Pop; dance-pop; electropop
- Length: 16:14
- Labels: Fascination; Mercury
- Producers: Steve Mac; Arnthor Birgisson; Xenomania; Space Cowboy; MNEK

The Saturdays chronology
On Your Radar (2011)	Chasing the Saturdays (2013)	Living for the Weekend (2013)

Singles from Chasing the Saturdays
- 1. "What About Us" Released: 18 December 2012

Chasing the Saturdays is the second extended play (EP) by British-Irish girl group the Saturdays. It was released on 27 January 2013 in the United States and Canada alone through Fascination and Mercury Records. The EP was the group's first release under Mercury since signing a US distribution deal. The EP collection is titled after their reality television programme, Chasing the Saturdays, which is broadcast through American television network E!. It follows the band trying to break into the American music market.

The collection features previous singles released into the UK throughout the Saturdays' five years as a pop group in the UK. The songs "All Fired Up" and "Notorious" are originally from their third studio album On Your Radar (2011); "Ego" is from their second studio album Wordshaker (2009) and "Higher" is from their debut EP Headlines! (2010). "What About Us", which was released in United States on 18 December 2012, acted as the lead single from the EP, though it would also be the second single from the Saturdays' fourth studio album Living for the Weekend (2013).

== Background and development ==
On 29 October 2012, it was announced that the Saturdays had been in talks with American television network E! about having their own reality television programme. It was later revealed that the band had in fact received their own TV show, Chasing the Saturdays broadcast through E! and also signed a joint record deal with Island Def Jam Records and Mercury Records.

The Saturdays began to make their presence in the United States known after they performed at the opening ceremony of MTV Video Music Awards. The group later thanked their US label for giving them a chance in the United States. The band pointed out that the record labels had made them feel welcome which took a lot of weight off their shoulders. The band said they have always respected the labels due to the massive success they've had with artists. The EP would be released after the band's reality television programme debuted in order to act as promotion in America. According to E! president Suzanne Kolb, "The Saturdays are a pop phenomenon with magnetic appeal and tremendous talent, and we are excited to capture their next chapter as they win over the hearts and playlists of America," adding that "'Chasing the Saturdays' is a perfect addition to E!'s popular Sunday night reality block, which continues to deliver can't miss original programming to viewers year-round." Upon its premiere in the United Kingdom, Chasing the Saturdays became that week's #139 most watched show with 72,000 viewers.

== Music and lyrics ==
The first track on Chasing the Saturdays, "What About Us" is the only newly recorded track. 4Music said of the song: "electro-pop affair with a bucket-load of synths thrown in for good measure. It's quite good, but we wonder if they should reconsider this single choice if they truly want to launch an invasion on America's charts." Mollie King said that they were so excited for fans to be able to hear the song due to them having the song for months. She said: "I can’t wait for everyone to hear it and to get to perform it. I’m just so excited about this one, I think it’s going down really well." The track is the band's first American single and they wanted to keep it the same type of music which they recorded. King said that the band wanted the American public to like them for themselves and not some genre they won't like to perform. She spoke: "We've always made a point that we don’t want to change to go to America. We wanted to go over as we are and if they like us, they like us and if they don’t, they don't!" The original version, which was released in America does not feature a guest rap from Sean Paul, whereas the European version does feature him. King said that the track was reggae pop music, a little different from what band usually record, but the track is still really "dancey" and "upbeat", as well a good song to dance to on either stage or at a club. She also revealed that the track will be the lead single from the band's fourth studio album, released later in the year. The second track on the album is "All Fired Up", which was originally from On Your Radar, written by Brian Higgins, Tim Deal, Matt Gray, Annie Yuill and Miranda Cooper and was produced by Space Cowboy, Brian Higgins and MNEK. The band recorded the song in 2011, when they were trying to make their third studio album more "sexier" and "definitely a different sound" to their previous albums. They also said the songs inspiration was their at the time celebrity boyfriends; David Gandy [Mollie King], Wayne Bridge [Frankie Sandford], Marvin Humes [Rochelle Wiseman], and Ben Foden [Una Healy]. However, at the time of the release of the album, Vanessa White was single and said she took inspiration from the track as it was a "party song" and she loved to party. "All Fired Up" is an electropop and dance-pop track and the second single released from original album, On Your Radar "All Fired Up" was described as "Ibiza closing party meet Miami poolside rave". The third track is "Higher", which features guest vocals from Flo Rida. "Higher" is originally a single from the band's mini-album, Headlines!. The track is an uptempo song, with a guitar-based melody that incorporates elements of electropop and synthpop. The track also has "surging beats" and a "breathless chorus". Rochelle Humes said that "Higher" was a classic "Saturdays pop tune" and they cannot do anything but dance when the track comes on. According to Humes the lyrics are a lot more serious to what the band are normally doing [before the release of On Your Radar] The band also make use of auto-tuning on their vocals. The production of the track was described as "busy" and "hectic." The single version of the song features new vocals from US rapper, Flo Rida, whereas the album track does not. The collaboration with Flo Rida came around after he beat the band to number-one on the UK Singles Chart for the second time and the band decided if they "could not beat him, join him". Flo Rida later responded by saying: "If we could make a collaboration happen I would be up for that. I don't know much about The Saturdays but we put smiles on people's faces when we make music, which counts more than getting number ones". Days later a collaboration between them had been created. "Notorious" is the fourth track on the album and the track is also featured on the band's third studio album, On Your Radar, where the track acted as the lead single from the album. The track is a dance-pop and electropop song and the track was recorded in late 2010 after the release of "Higher" in the UK, the band announced they would be heading back to the recording studio in order to recording studio. Steve Mac produced and wrote the song with Ina Wroldsen. Mac said that the track was very "different" to the previous tracks that he written and produced. King said that the song was a "dance floor filler" and the song can turn you into a bad girl. Una Healy said that they wanted to record this music due to dance music being massive "at the moment" [at the time of release]. Healy also said the track had a "drop-out chorus". The last track on the EP is "Ego" which was released and included from second studio album, Wordshaker. The single was also produced by Steve Mac and Ina Wrolden. The song was compared to the music by Eurythmics. Mac said that he had tried to create something with an influence of RedOne's work with Lady Gaga.

== Track listing ==
No.	Title	Writer(s)	Producer(s)	Length
1.	"What About Us"	Camille Purcell; Ollie Jacobs; Philip Jacobs	Ollie Jacobs; Philip Jacobs	3:24
2.	"All Fired Up"	Tim Deal; Brian Higgins; Matt Gray; Annie Yuill; Nick Dresti; Miranda Cooper	Xenomania; Space Cowboy; MNEK	3:11
3.	"Higher" (featuring Flo Rida)	Arnthor Birgisson; Ina Wroldsen	Arnthor Birgisson	3:18
4.	"Notorious"	Wroldsen; Steve Mac	Steve Mac	3:11
5.	"Ego" (Single Mix)	Wroldsen; Mac	Mac	3:10
Total length:				16:14

International alternate track
No.	Title	Writer(s)	Producer(s)	Length
5.	"Get Ready, Get Set"	Una Healy; Mollie King; Frankie Sandford; Rochelle Humes; Vanessa White; Higgins; Cooper; Nicolas Dresti; MNEK; Tim Deal; Gray	Xenomania	3:28

== Release history ==
Region	Date	Format	Label
United States	27 January 2013	Digital download	Fascination, Mercury Records
Canada	27 January 2013	Digital download	Fascination, Mercury Records

== Charts ==
Chart (2013)	Peak position
US Top Heatseekers (Billboard)	5
