= Living for the Weekend (The Saturdays album) =

Studio album by the Saturdays
- Released: 11 October 2013
- Recorded: 2011–2013
- Studios: Atlanta (Ninja Beat Club); Burbank, California (Glenwood Place Studios); Hastings (360 Mastering); London (Rollover Studios, Make Music Studio, Wayside Studios, Britannia Row, HUB II, Metropolis Studios); Los Angeles (2nd Floor Studios); New York City (Sterling Sound); North Hollywood (The JAM Studios)
- Genres: Pop; dance-pop; electropop
- Length: 40:51
- Labels: Fascination; Polydor
- Producers: The Alias; Art Bastian; Charlie Homes; Rodney "Darkchild" Jerkins; Steve Mac; Mike Mani; Jordan Omley; Carl Ryden; StopWaitGo; Red Triangle

The Saturdays chronology
Chasing the Saturdays (2013)	Living for the Weekend (2013)	Finest Selection: The Greatest Hits (2014)

The Saturdays studio album chronology
On Your Radar (2011)	Living for the Weekend (2013)

Singles from Living for the Weekend
- 1. "30 Days" Released: 11 May 2012; 2. "What About Us" Released: 18 December 2012; 3. "Gentleman" Released: 28 June 2013; 4. "Disco Love" Released: 4 October 2013; 5. "Not Giving Up" Released: 7 April 2014

Living for the Weekend is the fourth and final studio album by British girl group the Saturdays. It was first released on 11 October 2013, and in the United Kingdom on 14 October 2013, by Fascination Records and its associated record labels. Living for the Weekend was recorded between 2011 and 2013 in Los Angeles, London and New York City. Longtime collaborator Steve Mac returned to work on the album, as well as enlisting a range of new producers and writers including Rodney Jerkins, Autumn Rowe, Diane Warren, DNA Songs, Priscilla Renea, Camille Purcell, Jim Jonsin and others. The album was preceded by their first US release, an EP called Chasing the Saturdays.

"30 Days" was announced as the album's lead single and was released on 11 May 2012 and debuted at number seven on the UK Singles Chart. The second single from the album, "What About Us", was released in December 2012 and acted as the band's first international release. It was then released on 17 March 2013 in the United Kingdom and it debuted at number one on the UK Singles Chart, becoming the Saturdays first #1 single. "Gentleman" was released as the third single from the album in June 2013 and a fourth, "Disco Love" in October 2013, where it debuted at number five on the UK Singles Chart. The album received mostly mixed reviews from critics; some pointed out that the album had a "lack of personality". Many critics thought the latter part of the album was not as strong as the first half. Upon release, debuted at number ten on the UK Albums Chart, giving the Saturdays their fourth top-ten album in the UK. It also debuted at number 16 on the Irish Albums Chart, making it the band's second top-twenty album in Ireland.

== Background ==
In late October 2012, it was revealed to the public that the Saturdays were in talks to feature in their own reality television programme. Although, they had already done this previously with The Saturdays: 24/7 broadcast through ITV2. It was later revealed that American television network, E! were interested in showing their show programme. It was announced that they did sign a contract with the network and Chasing the Saturdays would be broadcast through E! internationally. The band signed a joint record deal with Island Def Jam Records and Mercury Records, to enable the group to release future material internationally mainly the United States and Canada. While the band were filming their reality television in America the band began working on new music and collaborating with a number of producers. Rodney Jerkins, who is known as "Darkchild" was revealed to be included in the band's fourth studio album. Many fans speculated that the album would be the band's last after Healy, Humes and Sandford all became mothers, but the band denied it and claimed they have been plans for the future including touring.

== Development ==
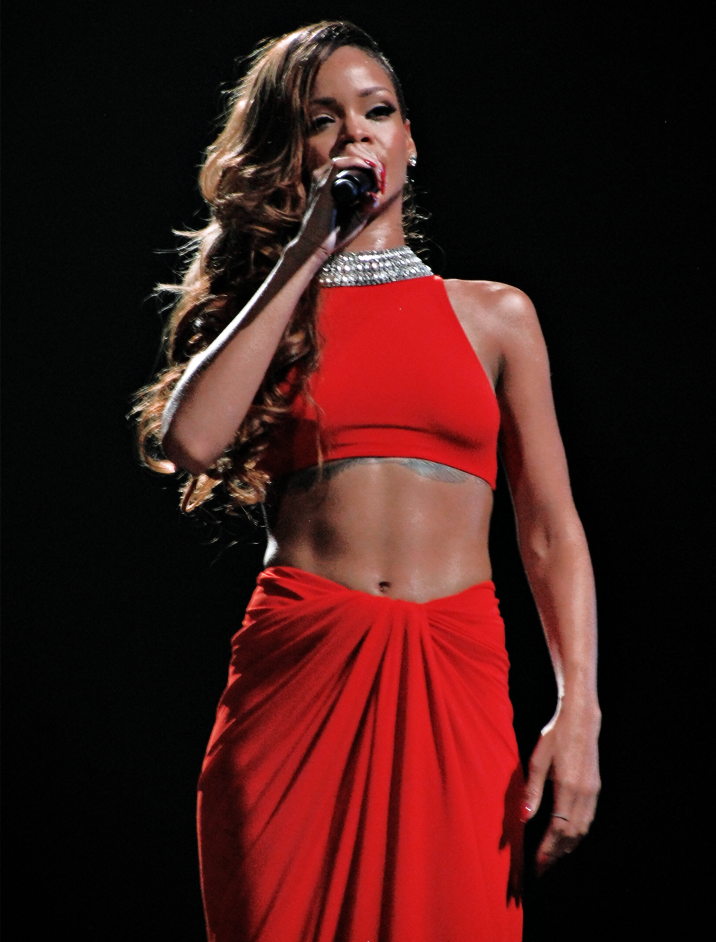
The Saturdays said it was an honour to be signed to the same label as Rihanna (pictured).

In order to promote themselves around the United States, they performed at opening ceremonies such as MTV Video Music Awards. The group later thanked their US label for giving them a chance in the United States. The band said that their new record label[s] made them feel welcome which helped them settle in and made them feel a lot more comfortable and they felt like a "weight off their shoulders". The Saturdays said they have a lot of respect for the label[s] and said it was an "honor" to be a part of their music group as they have enjoyed massive success with their artists, such as: Mariah Carey, Kanye West, Rihanna, 2 Chainz, Neon Trees and more. The band announced that they would release an extended play in North America in early 2013. The EP was officially released in North America on 27 January 2013, entitled Chasing the Saturdays. The EP would be released once they debuted their reality television show, entitled the same name, which it would act as a promotion for the band in America. The EP would feature the band's first American single, "What About Us" as well as previous singles which massive hits in their native, including: "All Fired Up", "Higher", which featured guest vocals from Flo Rida, "Notorious" and "Ego". According to E! president Suzanne Kolb, "The Saturdays are a pop phenomenon with magnetic appeal and tremendous talent, and we are excited to capture their next chapter as they win over the hearts and playlists of America," adding that "'Chasing the Saturdays' is a perfect addition to E!'s popular Sunday night reality block, which continues to deliver can't miss original programming to viewers year-round." After its premiere in their native, Chasing the Saturdays became one of the most watched show on E!, in the United Kingdom. They also performed at the 70th Golden Globe Awards.

It was revealed by Perez Hilton that the band had been working with Demi Lovato in the recording studio. It was revealed that Sean Paul would feature on the album. When the band were introducing themselves to the American public, Rochelle Humes said she was the "mum of the group", they call Mollie King the "Disney characters" although she said "I'm not. I don't think life's a fairy tale, but I do like to see the good in situations." Vanessa White revealed she loved to party: "I love going out. I don't enjoy the hangovers the next day, but it hasn't stopped me yet." Frankie Sandford said they the music industry was all she knew as she had been in the industry since she was a child in band, S Club 8, along with Humes. Where as Una Healy introduced herself along with her daughter Aoife Belle and husband, Ben Foden. The band said that the album would be "obviously the Sats sound" Sandford said that the album would be Dancey and upbeat but would ultimately be pop. King revealed that the band had written most of the songs on the album, which they were most excited about. The band said that they would like to bring "girl power" back to the US like the Spice Girls did. King said: "Since the Spice Girls there hasn't been a British girlband to make it in the US, it would be nice for us to bring a little girl power into the scene." However, fellow girl group Little Mix's debut album, DNA, set new records for a British girl group in the US in June 2013. Healy said she was "overwhelmed" with the people she has got the chance to work with on the album.

== Artwork and title ==
In early January 2013, the band announced that their fifth album would be released later in the year, and labelled the album The Chase. Fans assumed their fifth album would be titled this, however, the band later announced that it was only a "working title" and the new album does not have a name. Healy said: [The Chase] That's the working title, it's not the actual one. I think with the whole Chasing the Saturdays and chasing success, we'll call it that for now. But it's not the definite title. We'll have another single and then the album. We've finished it though. The official artwork for the album was released on 4 September 2013, as well as the official title, Living for the Weekend. The album artwork features all five members of the band, before Rochelle Humes and Frankie Sandford's pregnancies. Healy said that the title of the album came from the band's name The Saturdays. She said everybody "lives for the weekend" and the band's name is in the weekend, which made the title even more relevant.

== Composition and recording ==
The album's lead single, "30 Days" is produced by Steve Mac. Mac who is a regular collaborator has previously produced hit singles for the band including "Ego.". "30 Days" was said to "fill the dance floor with its echoing beats" Robert Copsey of Digital Spy rated the single 4 out of 5 stars, writing a positive review about its "blend of plinky synths", "rumbling electro beats" and "addictive chorus" which is "cooler than a blast of Listerine." The song had the effect of making you want "throw your arms up". The song has an "addictive chorus". "blend of plinky synths" and "rumbling electro beats" Some critics, however, questioned "30 Days" being on Living for the Weekend as they said the song would have been a good fit for the band's previous album, On Your Radar. It was revealed that the band had begun working with Darkchild on songs which are "kind of R&B-pop". Una Healy said: We've got a good mix. I'm really excited about it because we've got to work with some cool people It was revealed by Professor Green that the band were recording with DJ Fresh. Healy said that the whole opportunity of signing US label[s] was a great step for the band to get out and build a fan base in the United States. "The whole thing; performing, recording a great album to be released later in the year, and to work with the guys at E! who were professional and friendly. It was the opportunity of a lifetime."

"I can't wait for everyone to hear it and to get to perform it. I'm just so excited about this one, I think it's going down really well. We've always made a point that we don't want to change to go to America. We wanted to go over as we are and if they like us, they like us and if they don't, they don't!"

— Mollie King

The second single from the album, "What About Us" was written by Camille Purcell, Ollie Jacobs and Philip Jacobs. The song was the first track to be released in North America, and the band said they did not want to change their type of music for the American public. Sean Paul features on song and it would be the only collaboration on the album. The band teased saying that "What About Us" is a pop track, and that is a good indication of what the expect from the album, and that they've paired up with Diane Warren to record a few ballads and not just pop tracks. In early December 2012, the band tweeted "In the studio today! Finishing up a few tracks for the NEW ALBUM..whoop!" Although, the band returned to record more songs later in 2013. When in an interview the band were asked if they would record music like fellow British girlband, Stooshe, in which the band said they are not "brave" enough to record that type of music. But respected Stooshe's music.

Three of the band members were mothers or expecting mothers: Una Healy and husband Ben Foden's daughter was born in March 2011, Rochelle Wiseman and husband Marvin Humes's daughter was born in May 2012 and Frankie Sandford and fiancé Wayne Bridge's son is due to be born in October 2013. The band went into the studio with Arkarna and revealed they had recorded a "tune" with them.

=== Music and lyrics ===
"30 Days" is about being a part from the person you love and counting down the minutes until you're back together. "The song really struck a chord with us – it's a situation all of us can relate to, and we think a lot of fans will relate to it as well." Rochelle Humes said, "It’s a really amazing, catchy song but the sentiment behind it is being all excited and counting down the days to seeing someone when you’ve really been missing that person." The band revealed that they wanted to create an album which was "amazing", "crazy" and "very pop". King said "What About Us" features reggae pop music influence, a little different from what band usually record, but the track is still really "dancey" and "upbeat", as well a good song to dance to on either stage or at a club. When Una Healy was asked what the song was about she said that she "did not know" what the song was exactly about. "To be honest I was trying to figure out the other day what exactly it's about. I could bullshit away telling you, but I really don't know. But I think it's all about someone driving you crazy." She said she "thinks" that 'What About Us' part means "me and you getting together". She did point out that she did know that the song was about "making you happy" and that the track was good for the summer and will get you on the dancefloor. Rochelle Humes said that the band had recorded a new track, which features a more "edgy" vibe than their previous material. She also said that the track would be released at the end of Summer, which was revealed to be "Gentleman". She also said "It's very dancey", and that they hoped to experiment with other types of music genres on the album, she said: "It's going to be a lot more edgy than our previous stuff and what we are known for. I think we are definitely a pop band so we will carry on doing what we do best." She said that her most favourite thing about being a singer is that she can try out different styles of genres. The band warned fans that the new album would have a "fresh sound". Although, the said they weren't changing the sound too much. "It's a fresh start for a new album as it's got that slight reggae vibe, but is still a dance pop record."

== Marketing and promotion ==
Upon release the band began to promote the album by featuring in their own television series, Chasing the Saturdays, which the first episode brought in 914,000 viewers in the United States. Although the band revealed that they would not continue the show for a second season, they were thinking about featuring in a Christmas special. The band released an EP in North America to introduce themselves to the American market, with the same title as the TV show, which was released on 27 January 2013. The TV show featured snipped versions of tracks which would later appear on the album, including "Somebody Else's Life", which acted as the opening title to the show. The band began a promotional tour and appeared on a number of different talk shows in America, including: The Tonight Show with Jay Leno, The Jeff Probst Show, Fashion Police, Chelsea Lately and The Today Show in New York City.

=== Tour ===
On 19 October 2013, the Saturdays announced that they would go on tour in early 2014. Mollie King said: "We're already planning it now and it's going to be at the start of next year. We literally cannot wait". She revealed that Frankie Sandford was missing performing with the band while is on maternity leave and that she was "dying to get back out there". She said that they were excited because they have not been on tour for a long time: "But we actually haven't toured now for over a year, two years!" Rochelle Humes said that the band will not tour until Sandford is back from maternity leave. The Saturdays announce on The Paul O'Grady Show in late November 2013 that their tour will only be throughout the UK and Ireland.

=== Singles ===
"30 Days" was released as the lead single from Living for the Weekend, premiering on BBC Radio 1, on The Chris Moyles Show on 30 March 2012 and being released twelve days later on 11 May 2012. Critics were mainly positive about the song; saying the single had an "addictive chorus" and "cooler than a blast of Listerine." Upon release, the song debuted at number seven on the UK Singles Chart. The single became the band's eleventh single to chart within the top-ten in the United Kingdom. The track also charted at thirteen on the Irish Singles Chart.

"What About Us", which features guest vocals by Jamaican recording artist Sean Paul was released as the second single from the album and the first single internationally. It was released on 18 December 2012 in North America, but wasn't released in the United Kingdom until 17 March 2013. The single was heavily praised by critics, who enjoyed the "trace beats" and felt it was "radio friendly" and "strangely addictive". The track can also be found on the band's North American-released EP, Chasing the Saturdays. Upon release in the UK, the single debuted at number one on the chart, selling 114,000 copies in its first week. It also became the fastest selling single of 2013, at the time of release. It was the group's first number one single in the United Kingdom. "What About Us" debuted at six on the Irish Singles Chart, marking it the band's fifth top ten single in that country. As of August 2013, the song had sold 372,262 copies in the UK.

"Gentleman" was selected as the third single from the album and premiered on Capital Breakfast on 9 May 2013. The single was released in Ireland on 28 June 2013, and two days later in the UK. Upon release of the track, it debuted on the UK Singles Charts at number 14. The track gained the band comparisons with fellow British girl bands Girls Aloud and Little Mix. Critics had mixed reviews about the track, one critic said that the track was a "funky little tune, with a spoken-word bit that evokes Girls Aloud built around the following largely inexplicable hook". Linds Foley of Sugarscape commented that the single reminded her of Little Mix.

"Disco Love" was announced as the fourth single from the album and released on 4 October 2013. It will serve as the second single in North America, released on 22 October 2013. After the release of the single, it debuted on the UK Singles Chart at number 5. Third top-ten single from the album in the UK and the band's thirteenth top-ten single overall. The song also gives notice to Britney Spears' 1998 debut single, "...Baby One More Time". The band released the single with two b-side tracks, covers of "On the Radio" and "Love Come Down". Donna Summer is given recognition and attention in the song's lyrics: "It's never winter when it's Donna Summer all year long". Digital Spy described the single as "light 'n' fluffy electropop so sugary it'll rot your teeth in an instant, while the chorus has the kind of ear-snagging hooks that quickly dig deep."

"Not Giving Up" was announced as the fifth single to be lifted from Living for the Weekend via a YouTube video posted to the band's YouTube channel on 1 February 2014. A music video for the song was shot on 28 January. From 12 February, fans were able to pre-order the Not Giving Up CD single through the band's online store. The single's cover was also unveiled on this date. The music video of the song premiered on 18 February 2014. A radio mix of the song, featured in the music video, was on 6 April.

== Critical response ==
Professional ratings
Review scores
Source	Rating
AllMusic	3.5/5 stars
Bournemouth Daily Echo	mixed
Digital Spy	3/5 stars
omg!	mixed
Shields Gazette	6/10
So So Gay	3.5/5 stars
Today	2.5/5
Virgin Media	3/5 stars
Winnipeg Sun	1/5 stars
York Vision	mixed

Living for the Weekend garnered mixed reviews, with critics noticing the lack of personality and direction. Robert Copsey of Digital Spy called the album "a compilation of perfectly serviceable pop" but felt that "as a group, the Saturdays sound lost." Elliot Robinson of So So Gay wrote that the record "occasionally perpetuate[s] the more faceless dance pop its predecessor unfortunately introduced to the girls' sound" and that it "does feel rather calculated at times with some generic filler tracks." However, he called it "an enjoyable romp" and "an improvement over previous effort On Your Radar." Christopher Toh of Today wrote that "it’s not the best album of the year by any means, but it is great as background music for your weekend party, so in that sense, it works." Another common criticism among reviewers was the difference in quality between the album's first and second half. Jon O'Brien of omg! noticed that "like its predecessor, [...] the latter part of the record is virtually indistinguishable thanks to an over-reliance on the hands-in-the-air dance-pop that has dominated the charts since the rise of David Guetta et al" and stated that "if the Sats could have sustained the momentum of its opening half, then Living for the Weekend could have been a late contender for pop album of the year." The reviewer of the Shields Gazette noticed the same problem, but found the second half "inconsequential as opposed to horrid," saying that "it lacks personality in places, but it’s a better effort than many would expect from a group commonly [...] likened to a third-rate Girls Aloud." Matthew Horton of Virgin Media noted that the album contains the band's "best run of singles [...] ever," but otherwise felt that it "drags" and that it is "at least two tracks too long." Angus Quinn of York Vision felt the same way, stating that the record "really struggles once you're past the singles" and that "the album tracks could fit into almost anyone else's repertoire." Patrick Gough of the Bournemouth Daily Echo found that "the quality is strong and consistent for the first seven tracks, but after last year's single 30 Days, the songs become more generic" and felt that "the Saturdays have bags of charm and style but their identity gets a little lost towards the end of this album." Darryl Sterdan of the Canadian Winnipeg Sun gave a negative review, describing the album as "instantly forgettable pop, R&B and dance piffle about boys" and saying that the band "[had] best be living for the weekend, since that’s about as long as this will be on anybody’s playlist." A more favorable review came from AllMusic's Matt Collar, who noticed that Living for the Weekend "attempts to build upon the group's heightened profile with a bevy of infectious pop, soul, and electronic dance-club cuts that showcase the girls' resonant vocal chops" and described it as "an album of delicious pop" that "goes a long way toward helping the Saturdays achieve their dreams of worldwide diva domination." Daniel Falconer of female-oriented webzine FemaleFirst wrote that "the Saturdays are the girl group of today, and continue to go from strength to strength" and awarded the album four out of five stars.

== Commercial performance ==
Living for the Weekend was predicted to debut at number six on the UK Albums Chart. but it was later announced that it had in fact debuted at number ten. It became the Saturdays' fourth UK top-ten album. The following week, the album dropped 24 places to number 34. Living for the Weekend debuted at number 16 on the Irish Albums Chart, making it the band's second top-twenty album there. The album also appeared at number 11 on the Scottish Albums Chart.

== Track listing ==
Standard edition
No.	Title	Writer(s)	Producer(s)	Length
1.	"What About Us" (featuring Sean Paul)	Camille Purcell; Ollie Jacobs; Philip Jacobs; Sean Henriques	Art Bastian; Sam Kempler^{[a]}; James F. Reynolds^{[a]}; Jason "jigzagula" Henriques^{[b]}; Sean Paul^{[b]}	3:40
2.	"Disco Love"	Pálmi Ragner Ásgeirsson; Ásgeir Orri Ásgeirsson; Saethór Kristjánsson; Adam Klein	StopWaitGo	3:13
3.	"Gentleman"	Priscilla Renea; Lucas Nathanson; Scott Effman	Effman; GhostTrack^{[a]}; Renea^{[b]}	3:40
4.	"Leave a Light On"	Mike Mani; Jordan Omley; Lisa Scinta; Amber Riley	Mani; Omley^{[c]}	3:36
5.	"Not Giving Up"	Antonio Egizii; Celetia Martin; David Musumeci; Carl Ryden; Carla Marie Williams	Ryden	3:03
6.	"Lease My Love"	Renea; Rodney "Darkchild" Jerkins	Jerkins	3:40
7.	"30 Days"	Steve Mac; Autumn Rowe	Mac	3:04
8.	"Anywhere with You"	Una Healy; Mollie King; Frankie Sandford; Rochelle Humes; Vanessa White; David Schuler; Mani; Omley	Mani; Omley^{[c]}; Schuler^{[a]}	3:16
9.	"Problem with Love"	Mani; Omley; Jim Jonsin	Mani; Omley^{[c]}	3:38
10.	"You Don't Have the Right"	Diane Warren	Red Triangle; Kyle Townsend^{[b]}	3:43
11.	"Don't Let Me Dance Alone"	Healy; King; Sandford; Humes; White; Mani; Omley	Mani; Omley^{[c]}	3:26
12.	"Somebody Else's Life"	Healy; King; Sandford; Humes; White; Charlie Holmes; Lucie Silvas; Judie Tzuke	Charlie Holmes; Edward J "UK" Nixon^{[a]}	2:52

Deluxe edition bonus tracks
No.	Title	Writer(s)	Producer(s)	Length
13.	"Wildfire"	Healy; King; Sandford; Humes; White; Julian Gingell; Barry Stone	The Alias	3:37
14.	"What About Us" (album version)	Purcell; O. Jacobs; P Jacobs	Art Bastian; Kempler^{[a]}; Reynolds^{[a]}	3:51
15.	"What About Us" (featuring Sean Paul) (The Buzz Junkies Radio Edit)	Purcell; S. Henriques; O. Jacobs; P Jacobs	Art Bastian; Kempler^{[a]}; Reynolds^{[a]}; J. Henriques^{[b]}; Paul^{[b]}; The Buzz Junkies	3:23
16.	"Gentleman" (The Alias Radio Edit)	Renea; Nathanson; Effman	Effman; Renea^{[b]}; Ghost Track^{[a]}; The Alias	3:26
17.	"Disco Love" (Wideboys Radio Edit)	P. Ásgeirsson; Á. Ásgeirsson; Kristjánsson; Klein	StopWaitGo; The Wideboys	3:21
18.	"Not Giving Up" (JRMX WeLovePop Radio Edit)	Ryden; Williams; Egizii; Martin; Musumeci	Ryden; Joel Storry; Jon Musgrave	3:52

Notes

- ^{^[a]} signifies additional producer
- ^{^[b]} signifies vocal producer
- ^{^[c]} signifies vocal producer as well as record producer
- Track 14 is a version of "What About Us" without Sean Paul, labelled as the "album version" on this release. It is also known as the "extended mix" and is longer than the Saturdays-only version of "What About Us" from the single.

== Personnel and credits ==
=== Recording locations ===
- Atlanta (Ninja Beat Club)
- Burbank, California (Glenwood Place Studios)
- Hastings (360 Mastering)
- London, England (Rollover Studios, Make Music Studio, Wayside Studios, Britannia Row, HUB II, Metropolis Studios)
- Los Angeles (2nd Floor Studios)
- New York City (Sterling Sound)
- North Hollywood (The JAM Studios)

=== Personnel ===
Personnel Living for the Weekend adapted from AllMusic.

- Mollie King- Vocals, Rhythm Guitar
- Una Healy- Vocals, Lead Guitar
- Frankie Sandford- Vocals, 2nd Rhythm Guitar
- Vanessa White- Vocals, Bass
- Rochelle Humes- Vocals, Drums
- Ásgeir Orri Ásgeirsson – Composer
- Pálmi Ragnar Ásgeirsson – Composer
- Scott Effman – Composer
- Anthony Egizii – Composer
- Priscilla Renea Hamilton – Composer
- Una Healy – Composer
- Sean Henriques – Composer
- Charlie Holmes – Composer
- Rochelle Humes – Composer
- Oliver Jacobs – Composer
- Philip Jacobs – Composer
- Rodney Jerkins – Composer
- Jim Johnson – Composer
- Mollie King – Composer
- Adam Klein – Composer
- Saethór Kristjánsson – Composer
- Steve Mac – Composer
- Michael Mani – Composer
- Mike Mani – Composer
- Celetia Martin – Composer
- David Musumeci – Composer
- Lukas Nathanson – Composer
- Jordan Omley – Composer
- Sean Paul – Primary Artist
- Camille Purcell – Composer
- Amber Riley – Composer
- Autumn Rowe – Composer
- Carl Ryden – Composer
- Frankie Sandford – Composer
- Francesca Sanford – Composer
- The Saturdays – Primary Artist
- David Schuler – Composer
- Lisa Scinta – Composer
- Lucie Silvas – Composer
- Judie Tzuke – Composer
- Kevin Verchel – Vocal Arranger
- Diane Warren – Composer
- Vanessa White – Composer
- Carla Marie Williams – Composer
- Rochelle Wiseman – Composer

== Release formats ==
Standard version

- Standard 12 tracks

Deluxe version

- Special rectangular packaging case
- Standard 12 tracks, 6 bonus tracks

== Charts ==
Chart performance for Living for the Weekend
Chart (20123)	Peak position
Irish Albums (IRMA)	16
Scottish Albums (Official Charts)	11
UK Albums (Official Charts)	10
US Top Heatseekers (Billboard)	25

== Release history ==
All releases below were confirmed on the group's official website on 10 October 2013.

Region	Date	Format	Label	Edition(s)
Austria	11 October 2013	CD; digital download	Fascination; Polydor	Standard, Deluxe
Belgium	11 October 2013	CD; digital download	Fascination; Polydor	Standard, Deluxe
Czech Republic	11 October 2013	CD; digital download	Fascination; Polydor	Standard, Deluxe
Ireland	11 October 2013	CD; digital download	Fascination; Polydor	Standard, Deluxe
Germany	11 October 2013	CD; digital download	Fascination; Polydor	Standard, Deluxe
Netherlands	11 October 2013	CD; digital download	Fascination; Polydor	Standard, Deluxe
New Zealand	11 October 2013	CD; digital download	Fascination; Polydor	Standard, Deluxe
Slovakia	11 October 2013	CD; digital download	Fascination; Polydor	Standard, Deluxe
Slovenia	11 October 2013	CD; digital download	Fascination; Polydor	Standard, Deluxe
South Africa	11 October 2013	CD; digital download	Fascination; Polydor	Standard, Deluxe
Switzerland	11 October 2013	CD; digital download	Fascination; Polydor	Standard, Deluxe
United Kingdom	14 October 2013	CD; digital download	Fascination; Polydor	Standard, Deluxe
Japan	16 October 2013	CD; digital download	Universal Music Japan	Standard, Deluxe
Australia	18 October 2013	CD; digital download	Polydor	Standard, Deluxe
Canada	22 October 2013	Digital download	Mercury	Standard, Deluxe
United States	22 October 2013	Digital download	Mercury	Standard, Deluxe
Canada	5 November 2013	CD	Mercury	Deluxe
