= Wordshaker =

Studio album by the Saturdays
- Released: 12 October 2009
- Recorded: 2008; March–July 2009
- Studios: Corby, England (Untouchable Sound); London, UK (Twenty One, Strongroom, Odd Bob, Britannia Row, Sarm); Novato, California (Homesite 13); Hollywood, California (Henson); Burbank, California (Jam); Los Angeles, California (The Shores); Stockholm, Sweden (A Side, Lighthouse, Quiz & Larossi; Oslo, Norway (Stereo)
- Genres: Dance-pop; electropop; pop rock; synth-pop
- Length: 43:04
- Labels: Fascination; Polydor
- Producers: Louis Biancaniello; Chris Braide; Jörgen Elofsson; David Eriksen; Thomas Eriksen; Oliver Goldstein; Quiz & Larossi; Steve Mac; Per Magnusson; Michael Mani; Jordan Omley; Justin Trugman; Sam Watters; Pär Westerlund

The Saturdays chronology
Chasing Lights (2008)	Wordshaker (2009)	Headlines! (2010)

Singles from Wordshaker
- 1. "Forever Is Over" Released: 5 October 2009; 2. "Ego" Released: 4 January 2010

Wordshaker is the second studio album by British-Irish girl group the Saturdays, released on 12 October 2009 through Fascination Records. Upon release the album peaked at number nine on the UK Albums Chart. In August 2010, the album was removed from digital music platforms, due to their EP Headlines! being released featuring some of the same material. In August 2018, the album returned to digital music platforms following a request to the label by the Pop Music Activism Twitter account.

The album was preceded by the lead single "Forever Is Over", written by James Bourne and produced by The Runaways. The song peaked at number two in the UK Singles Chart. The second single, "Ego" was released on 4 January 2010 and reached number nine.

== Background and production ==
The group started working on the album in early March 2009 whilst they performed their first headline shows, the Work Tour. Two songs from the recording sessions "One Shot" and "Wordshaker" were part of the setlist and appeared on the album. The track list for the album contains the song "Not Good Enough", which was originally recorded during the Chasing Lights sessions but was later remixed for inclusion on Wordshaker. The official cover was revealed in a special mailer to fans on the group's official form/website on 23 September 2009.

The majority of the album (seven songs) were written/co-written by Norwegian songwriter Ina Wroldsen who has written previously for the group as well as working with The Pussycat Dolls, Pixie Lott and Leona Lewis. Additionally the album features one song called "Deeper" which accredits every member of the group as a writer. Additionally it was revealed that the song "Forever Is Over" (later chosen to be the first single) was in fact written for Kelly Clarkson to record for her album. However, during a visit to the record label's HQ the Saturdays heard the song and requested the song's writer James Bourne to let them record it instead.

== Promotion ==
The news section on the group's official website indicated that through September and October 2009, the girls were seen on many TV shows as they promote the album.

On 26 September the group were interviewed on T4 where they introduced the music video for new single "Forever Is Over". Additionally on 28 September the group appeared on daytime chatshow the Paul O'Grady Show for the first live performance of the single and an informal interview. They did the same on ITV1's daytime show This Morning on 6 October. On 12 October they appeared on the new season of The Alan Titchmarsh Show for a chat and performance before a scheduled appearance at the Hollyoaks Music Festival on 17 October to perform "Forever Is Over" and the title song "Wordshaker".

With the release of "Ego", promotion for the album was furthered over the Christmas period, as the group appeared on GMTV, Blue Peter, Alan Carr: Chatty Man and the Christmas edition of Top of the Pops, as well as a T4 special filmed at an exclusive concert held for competition winners at the London Forum, as part of the group's promotional tie in with the Impulse range of body fragrances. Additionally, the album track "Lose Control" came to prominence when featured on the soundtrack to the film St Trinian's 2: The Legend of Fritton's Gold, released by the group's record label Fascination.

== Reception ==
Professional ratings
Review scores
Source	Rating
AllMusic	3/5 stars
Digital Spy	3/5 stars
musicOMH	3/5 stars
Newsround	4/5 stars
OK!	4/5 stars
Yahoo! Music	8/10 stars

Wordshaker generated generally favourable reviews amongst critics upon its release. AllMusic's Matthew Chisling awarded the album three out of five stars, praising the girls and the album for "combining aggressive basslines and vocals that are a pinch of prowess". Chisling's praised tracks like "Open Up", "Lose Control" and "Not Good Enough" for their "catchiness [that] can't be denied". However he criticised "Forever Is Over" and "One Shot" for being "unoriginal" and for being "too Americanized".

David Balls of Digital Spy said that "If anything, the girls are showing even more confidence this time around", Praising 'One Shot' and 'Wordshaker' for both combining "grinding basslines with lethal pop hooks". However he was less impressed with the ballads criticising and calling them a "curse" on the album. As a whole he called the album "fresh-sounding" and that it "should take the group one step closer to household names". He went on to give the album three out of five stars.

Michael Cragg from musicOMH called the album as a whole an "enjoyable blast of well-crafted pop" with "throbbing synths" that's "joyful". The only critique Cragg had was that "The Saturdays have yet to master – the ballad" stating they "bludgeon most of the slower songs to death." but when they stick to having fun its very "enjoyable". Cragg went on to give the album three out of five stars.

== Singles ==
"Forever Is Over" was written by Louis Biancaniello, Sam Watters, Kahmarl Gordon, James Bourne, and produced by Sam Watters and Louis Biancaniello. It was released as the lead single from Wordshaker on 5 October 2009 and peaked at number two. "Ego" was written and produced by Steve Mac, and co-written by Ina Wroldsen. An electropop track, it was the second and final single released from Wordshaker. The song was added to mainstream radio on 25 November 2009. A superhero-themed music video, directed by Richard A. Moore, was released on 17 November 2009 and the single itself was released on 4 January 2010.

== Track listing ==
Wordshaker track listing
No.	Title	Music	Producer(s)	Length
1.	"Forever Is Over"	Sam Watters; Louis Biancaniello; James Bourne	Biancaniello; Watters	3:40
2.	"Here Standing"	Jordan Omley; Michael Mani; Nina Woodford	Mani; Omley	3:36
3.	"Ego"	Steve Mac; Ina Wroldsen	Mac	2:59
4.	"No One"	Wroldsen; David Eriksen	D. Eriksen; Thomas Eriksen	3:18
5.	"One Shot"	Wroldsen; David Kreuger; Per Magnusson	Magnusson	3:31
6.	"Wordshaker"	Wroldsen; D. Eriksen	D. Eriksen	3:30
7.	"Denial"	Chris Braide; Wroldsen	Braide	3:53
8.	"Open Up"	Wroldsen; Kreuger; Magnusson	Magnusson	3:52
9.	"Lose Control"	Jörgen Elofsson; Pär Westerlund	Elofsson; Westerlund	3:19
10.	"Not Good Enough"	Wroldsen; Josef Larossi	Quiz & Larossi	3:40
11.	"Deeper"	Una Healy; Mollie King; Frankie Sandford; Rochelle Humes; Vanessa White; Wroldsen	Justin Trugman; Oliver Goldstein	4:05
12.	"2 am"	Andreas Romdhane; Larossi; Wroldsen	Quiz & Larossi	4:08
Total length:				43:04

== Credits ==
Credits adapted from album booklet and liner.

=== Recording Locations ===
- California
  - Burbank: The Jam Studios
  - Hollywood: Henson Recording Studios
  - Los Angeles: The Shores
  - Novato: Homesite 13
- England
  - Corby: Untouchable Sound Studios
  - London: Twenty One Studios, Strongroom, Odd Bob Studios, Britannia Row, Sarm Studies, Rokstone Studios (audio engineering only), 360 Mastering (audio mastering only)
- Italy
  - Trieste: Eccentric Records (audio mixing only)
- Sweden
  - Stockholm: A Side Studios, The Lighthouse, Mono Music Studios (audio mixing only), Quiz & Larossi Studios
- Norway
  - Oslo: Stereo Sound
- Virginia
  - Virginia Beach: MixStar Studios (audio mixing only)

=== Personnel ===
==== Vocals ====
- ReVaughn Brown - background vocals (track 1)
- Una Healy - lead vocals
- Mollie King - lead vocals
- Frankie Sandford - lead vocals
- Vanessa White - lead vocals
- Rochelle Wiseman - lead vocals
- Nina Woodford - background vocals (track 2)
- Ina Wroldsen - background vocals (track 3, 4)

==== Musicians and technicians ====
- Dick Beetham - mastering engineer
- Louis Biancaniello - audio mixing, keyboard programming (track 1), record producer (track 1)
- James Bourne - guitar
- David Eriksen - record producer (track 4), drums, keyboards, programmer, audio mixing
- Thomas Eriksen - record producer (track 4), additional keyboards, additional record producer (track 4)
- Serban Ghenea - audio mixing
- John Hanes - audio engineer
- Paul Lamalfa - assistant recording engineer
- Chris Laws - audio engineer, programmer
- Steve Mac - record producer (track 3), keyboards, vocal arrangement
- Mike Manny - record producer (track 2), keyboards, audio mixing, programmin
- Jordan Omley - record producer (track 2), audio mixing
- Daniel Pursey - percussion
- Tim Roberts - assistant audio mixing
- Sam Watters - audio mixing, record producer (track 1)
- Ina Wroldsen - record producer (track 4), vocal arrangement

== Charts ==
The album debuted at number 36 on the Irish Albums Chart but fell to 91 in the second week. Meanwhile, on the UK Albums Chart it debuted at number 9, equalling the peak position of their debut album Chasing Lights.

Chart performance for Wordshaker
Chart (2009)	Peak position
Irish Albums Chart	36
UK Albums (Official Charts)	9

== Certifications ==
Certifications for Wordshaker
Country	Provider	Certification
United Kingdom	BPI	Silver

== Release history ==
Release history and formats for Wordshaker
Country	Format	Date	Label
Ireland	CD, digital download	9 October 2009	Polydor
United Kingdom	CD, digital download	12 October 2009	Fascination
Various	Digital download, streaming	10 August 2018	Universal Music Catalogue
