= Not Giving Up =

Single by The Saturdays

from the album Living for the Weekend
- B-side: "Bigger"
- Released: 4 April 2014
- Recorded: 2012
- Genre: Progressive house; trance
- Length: 3:04; 3:18 (Radio Mix)
- Label: Fascination; Polydor
- Songwriters: Antonio Egizii; Celetia Martin; David Musumeci; Carl Ryden; Carla Marie Williams
- Producer: Carl Ryden

The Saturdays singles chronology
"Disco Love" (2013)	"Not Giving Up" (2014)	"What Are You Waiting For?" (2014)

Music video
- "Not Giving Up" on YouTube

"Not Giving Up" is a song by British-Irish girl group The Saturdays. It was released on 6 April 2014 as the fifth and final single from their fourth studio album Living for the Weekend (2013). The song was written by Antonio Egizii, Celetia Martin, David Musumeci, Carl Ryden and Carla Marie Williams, and produced by Ryden.

"Not Giving Up" was first previewed on The Saturdays' reality show Chasing the Saturdays in January 2013. The music video marked Frankie Sandford's official return to the group, after taking time off in 2013 to have her first child.

== Background ==
On 28 January 2014, during one of the group's "Flip" videos, Rochelle Humes and Una Foden teased their new music video, showing off the outfits they would be wearing in it. They did not reveal what single the video was for, but Foden described the video as "sexy, vibrant and brash", whilst Humes said it would look "strong".

On 1 February, in another "Flip", Frankie Sandford announced that "Not Giving Up" would be the next single released from Living for the Weekend. She said: "We're so excited. We listened to all you fans and know you all love it so it was a bit of a no-brainer for us. We all love it and thought, 'We have to release it'. We've just finished the video for it. I'm so excited. It's a little different from what we've done before. It will be wicked." The single was also confirmed by the group via Twitter. The single's artwork was revealed on 11 February.

== Critical reception ==
The song received mostly positive reviews from music critics. Bradley Stern of music website MuuMuse recognised "Not Giving Up" as the best song off the album, commenting “Not Giving Up is amazing for a variety of reasons: For one thing, it’s about not giving up on love. Persistence is inspiring! But then, the actual song’s fantastic too. Actually, it’s stupid good." Jon O'Brien for Yahoo! called the song "one of the strongest singles of their up-and-down career" describing it as "contemporary dancefloor-friendly fare with a trance-pop sugar rush."

== Music video ==
The music video was filmed on 28 January 2014. It was uploaded to YouTube on 18 February 2014. The video shows the girls performing with glowing sticks.

== Track listings ==
Not Giving Up - CD Single (Released 4 Apr, 2014)

1. "Not Giving Up" (Radio Mix)" - 3:19
2. "Bigger" - 2:50
3. "Not Giving Up" (Karaoke Version)" - 3:19
4. "Leave A Light On" (The Collective Radio Edit)" - 3:57

Not Giving Up - Digital Single (Released 4 Apr, 2014)

1. "Not Giving Up" (Radio Mix)" - 3:18

Not Giving Up - EP (Released 4 Apr, 2014)

1. "Not Giving Up" (Extended 12" Version)" - 4:52
2. "Bigger" - 2:50
3. "Not Giving Up" (Cahill Remix Radio Edit)" - 3:08
4. "Not Giving Up" (TKNIK Radio Edit)" - 3:19
5. "What About Us" (Acoustic Live from Transmitter Studios / 2014)" - 2:54

Not Giving Up - Remix EP (Released 4 Apr, 2014)

1. "Not Giving Up" (JRMX Club Heaven Radio Edit)" - 3:51
2. "Not Giving Up" (Cahill Remix)" - 6:10
3. "Not Giving Up" (JRMX WeLovePop Remix)" - 6:18
4. "Not Giving Up" (TKNIK Remix)" - 6:12
5. "Not Giving Up" (JRMX Club Heaven Club Mix)" - 6:28

Revamped Version

1. "Not Giving Up" (Radio Mix)" - 3:19
2. "Bigger" - 2:50
3. "Not Giving Up" (Extended 12" Version)" - 4:52
4. "Leave A Light On" (The Collective Radio Edit)" - 3:57
5. "Not Giving Up" (Cahill Remix Radio Edit)" - 3:08
6. "Not Giving Up" (JRMX Club Heaven Radio Edit)" - 3:51
7. "Not Giving Up" (TKNIK Radio Edit)" - 3:19
8. "Not Giving Up" (JRMX WeLovePop Radio Edit)" - 3:52
9. "What About Us (Acoustic Live from Transmitter Studios / 2014)" - 2:54
10. "Not Giving Up" (Cahill Remix)" - 6:10
11. "Not Giving Up" (JRMX WeLovePop Remix)" - 6:18
12. "Not Giving Up" (TKNIK Remix)" - 6:12
13. "Not Giving Up" (JRMX Club Heaven Club Mix)" - 6:28
14. "Not Giving Up" (Karaoke Version)" - 3:19

== Charts ==
Chart (2014)	Peak position
Ireland (IRMA)	26
Scottish Singles Sales (Official Charts)	15
UK Singles (Official Charts)	19

== Release history ==
Country	Date	Format	Label	Ref
Ireland	4 April 2014	CD single; digital download; remix EP	Fascination; Polydor	
United Kingdom	6 April 2014	CD single; digital download; remix EP	Fascination; Polydor	
