= Disco Love =

Single by The Saturdays

from the album Living for the Weekend
- B-side: "Love Come Down"; "On the Radio"
- Released: 4 October 2013
- Recorded: 2013
- Genre: Electropop; disco
- Length: 3:13
- Label: Fascination; Polydor
- Songwriters: Pálmi Ragnar Ásgeirsson; Ásgeir Orri Ásgeirsson; Saethór Kristjánsson; Adam Klein
- Producer: StopWaitGo

The Saturdays singles chronology
"Gentleman" (2013)	"Disco Love" (2013)	"Not Giving Up" (2014)

Music video
- "Disco Love" on YouTube

"Disco Love" is a song recorded by British-Irish girl group The Saturdays from their fourth studio album, Living for the Weekend (2013). Written and produced by Icelandic producers StopWaitGo, it was released on 4 October 2013 as the fourth single from the album. The song peaked at number five on the UK Singles Chart with first week sales of 51,690 copies.

== Background and composition ==
"Disco Love" has a notable disco theme, as do its B-sides "Love Come Down" and "On the Radio", which were originally recorded and released by Evelyn King and Donna Summer respectively. Summer is given recognition and attention in the song's lyrics: "It's never winter when it's Donna Summer all year long". The song also gives notice to The Bee Gees, as well as Britney Spears' 1998 debut single, "...Baby One More Time". The group announced the release of "Disco Love" on 26 July 2013 on their official Facebook account, announcing, "Team Sats! We're having a blast shooting the video for our next single 'Disco Love'! Can't wait for you guys to hear it! #SatsDiscoLove"

== Reception ==
Robert Copsey of Digital Spy described the single as "light 'n' fluffy electropop so sugary it'll rot your teeth in an instant, while the chorus has the kind of ear-snagging hooks that quickly dig deep." While giving the single four out of five stars, they also compared the single to the group's previous material, citing, "Don't get us wrong, we enjoyed their recent foray into US-friendly pop, but we'll always prefer The Saturdays when they're at their most gaudy and glittery." Sam Lansky from Idolator called the song "a beacon of lighthouse illuminating the darkness of the charts!" He also described it as "instantaneous and propulsive, and exactly the shot of adrenaline that they needed."

== Music video ==
The accompanying video was filmed in July 2013 around Blackheath Common. It premiered on The Saturdays' Vevo channel at midnight on 25 August 2013.

The video follows The Saturdays as they journey to three years, each a decade apart: 1979, 1989 and 1999 - by dressing up in appropriately themed outfits and performing the track in three different settings: the countryside, a rollerskating rink and a skatepark.

== Live performances and promotion ==
The group performed the single for the first time on ITV's Stepping Out on 21 September 2013. During the song's release week, the group also performed on Sunday Brunch and Surprise Surprise on 6 October, Daybreak on 7 October and This Morning on 9 October. The following week, in promotion for Living for the Weekend, the group also scheduled as performance at G-A-Y Heaven in London on 12 October and an appearance on The Alan Titchmarsh Show on 16 October. The group also performed the single on The Paul O'Grady Show. Due to her pregnancy, Frankie Sandford was absent from the group's live performances of the single.

== Formats and track listings ==
Disco Love – CD Single

(Released 4 Oct, 2013)

1. "Disco Love" – 3:14
2. "Love Come Down" – 3:32
3. "On the Radio" – 3:51
4. "Disco Love (StarLab Disco Radio Edit)" – 3:53

Disco Love – Digital Single

(Released 4 Oct, 2013)

1. "Disco Love" – 3:14

Disco Love (Remixes) – EP

(Released 4 Oct, 2013)

1. "Disco Love (Wideboys Radio Edit)" – 3:21
2. "Love Come Down" – 3:32
3. "On the Radio" – 3:51
4. "Disco Love (StarLab Disco Radio Edit)" – 3:53

Disco Love (Remixes) – Single

(Released 4 Oct, 2013)

1. "Disco Love (Wideboys Club Mix)" – 5:43
2. "Disco Love (StarLab Disco Club Mix)" – 6:06
3. "Disco Love (LoveBug Club Mix)" – 5:11

Disco Love (Acoustic Live from Transmitter Studios / 2013) – Single

(Released 11 Oct, 2013)

1. "Disco Love (Acoustic Live from Transmitter Studios / 2013)" – 3:14

Revamped Version

1. "Disco Love" – 3:14
2. "Love Come Down" – 3:32
3. "On the Radio" – 3:51
4. "Disco Love (Wideboys Radio Edit)" – 3:21
5. "Disco Love (StarLab Disco Radio Edit)" – 3:53
6. "Disco Love (Acoustic Live from Transmitter Studios / 2013)" – 3:14
7. "Disco Love (Wideboys Club Mix)" – 5:43
8. "Disco Love (StarLab Disco Club Mix)" – 6:06
9. "Disco Love (LoveBug Club Mix)" – 5:11

== Charts ==
=== Weekly charts ===
Chart (2013)	Peak position
Croatia (ARC Top 100)	71
Euro Digital Song Sales (Billboard)	10
Hungary (Rádiós Top 40)	8
Ireland (IRMA)	9
Scottish Singles Sales (Official Charts)	4
Slovakia Airplay (ČNS IFPI)	74
UK Singles (Official Charts)	5

=== Year-end charts ===
Chart (2013)	Position
UK Singles Chart	167

Chart (2014)	Position
Hungary (Rádiós Top 40)	75

== Certifications ==
Region	Certification	Certified units/sales
United Kingdom (BPI)	Silver	200,000^{‡}
^{‡} Sales+streaming figures based on certification alone.

== Release history ==
Country	Date	Format	Label
Ireland	4 October 2013	CD single; digital download; remix EP	Polydor
New Zealand	4 October 2013	CD single; digital download; remix EP	Polydor
United Kingdom	6 October 2013	CD single; digital download; remix EP	Fascination
France	14 October 2013	Digital download	Universal Music
Australia	18 October 2013	Digital download	Universal Music
United States	22 October 2013	Digital download	Mercury
Canada	22 October 2013	Digital download	Mercury
