= 30 Days (The Saturdays song) =

Single by The Saturdays

from the album Living for the Weekend
- B-side: "Turn Myself In"
- Released: 11 May 2012
- Recorded: 2011
- Genre: Dance-pop
- Length: 3:05
- Label: Polydor
- Songwriter(s): Steve Mac; Autumn Rowe
- Producer(s): Steve Mac

The Saturdays singles chronology
"My Heart Takes Over" (2011)	"30 Days" (2012)	"What About Us" (2012)

Music video
- "30 Days" on YouTube

Professional ratings
Review scores
Source	Rating
Digital Spy	4/5 stars

"30 Days" is a song by British-Irish girl group The Saturdays, from their fourth studio album Living for the Weekend (2013). It was released as the lead single from the album on 11 May 2012 in Ireland and 14 May in the United Kingdom respectively. The single debuted and peaked at number seven on UK Singles Chart, becoming the group's eleventh top ten on the chart.

== Background and composition ==
"30 Days"

Rochelle Wiseman explained the concept of the single, "It's a really amazing, catchy song but the sentiment behind it is being all excited and counting down the days to seeing someone when you’ve really been missing that person."

== Release ==
The single premiered live on BBC Radio 1 on "The Chris Moyles Show" on 30 March 2012. The song was released on 11 May 2012 in Ireland and 14 May 2012 in the United Kingdom.

== Reception ==
=== Critical response ===
The song has received mixed to positive response from critics and fans. Newsroom gave the song 4 out of 5 stars and wrote "30 Days is sure to fill the dance floor with its echoing beats. The chorus makes you want to throw your arms up and there's a brilliant drum fill after each verse which one music journalist said sounds like "A potato being thrown in a bin". The vocals are shared evenly between the girls and sound moody, although they've been edited a bit too much and some emotion and personality has gone. It's a shame because we know all the girls are great vocalists". Stereoboard.com agreed writing "this track would have been perfect for the 'On Your Radar' album as it carries on the same dance feel the album had. '30 Days' is a very catchy track and has a very chart-friendly and club feel to it. It certainly seems that The Saturdays are trying to break away from the clean cut pop image that they burst onto the scene with; however I think the new dance sound with a touch of pop sound suits them". Robert Copsey of Digital Spy rated the single 4 out of 5 stars, writing a positive review about its "blend of plinky synths", "rumbling electro beats" and "addictive chorus" which is "cooler than a blast of Listerine."

=== Chart performance ===
In Scotland, "30 Days" entered the chart at number 2; the single also entered the UK Singles Chart at number 7 on the week ending 26 May 2012. The song also peaked at number 13 in Ireland.

== Promotion ==
The Saturdays appeared on series 8 of Alan Carr: Chatty Man on 27 April 2012. Although there was no performance, the group chatted about the single and the music video was played during their interview. The Saturdays also appeared on the Channel 4 music show Koko Pop on 5 May 2012.

The Saturdays also appeared on Channel 4 programme Sunday Brunch for an interview on 13 May 2012. The group performed "30 Days" for the first time on ITV's This Morning on 14 May 2012. Further performances of "30 Days" took place at Daybreak on 18 May 2012 and Keith Lemon's LemonAid on 19 May 2012. on 2 June, The Saturdays performed the single, along with their single "Up" at Birmingham Pride 2012.

== Music video ==
The video for "30 Days" was shot in February 2012 at an American-style restaurant in London. The making of the video was documented for the MTV broadcast "On Set with the Saturdays", in which The Saturdays give a tour of the set and talk about the plot of the video. The video premiered on 5 April on Chart Show TV and Vevo. The Saturdays also had a chat with Stefanie Faleo on Chart Show TV to talk about 30 Days.

=== Video synopsis ===
The video starts off with the girls arriving at an American style diner. They enter the diner intending to have a meal together but then realize they have accidentally walked in on a speed dating night, with a sign on the wall that reads "find your soul mate in 30 dates or less". Vanessa decides they should give it a go and the girls all sit down separately and are each greeted by several men. Una showcases her baby bump and Rochelle her engagement ring as ways to fend off some of the men they do not approve of. During the final chorus everyone in the diner dances together after the speed dating is over.

== Formats and track listings ==
CD single

1. "30 Days" – 3:06
2. "Turn Myself In" – 3:35

Digital Single

(Released 25 Jan 2013)

1. "30 Days" – 3:06

Digital (Remixes) – EP

(Released 11 May 2012)

1. "30 Days" (Max Sanna & Steve Pitron Club Mix) – 6:22
2. "30 Days" (Atomic UK Garage Radio Edit) – 3:16
3. "30 Days" (Bass Ninjas Remix) – 3:54
4. "30 Days" (Ruff Loaderz Club Mix) – 5:28

Digital EP

(iTunes pre-order only)

1. "30 Days" – 3:06
2. "Turn Myself In" – 3:35
3. "30 Days" (Karaoke Version) – 3:05
4. "30 Days" (Ruff Loaderz Radio Mix) – 3:47
5. "The Way You Watch Me" (The Saturdays-Only Version) (iTunes pre-order only) – 3:00

Revamped Version

1. "30 Days" – 3:06
2. "Turn Myself In" – 3:35
3. "The Way You Watch Me" (The Saturdays-Only Version) – 2:59
4. "30 Days" (Atomic UK Garage Radio Edit) – 3:16
5. "30 Days" (Max Sanna & Steve Pitron Radio Edit) – 3:34
6. "30 Days" (JRMX Radio Edit) – 3:52
7. "30 Days" (Ruff Loaderz Radio Mix) – 3:47
8. "30 Days" (Bass Ninjas Club Edit) – 5:05
9. "30 Days" (Max Sanna & Steve Pitron Club Mix) – 6:22
10. "30 Days" (JRMX Club Mix) – 6:13
11. "30 Days" (Ruff Loaderz Club Mix) – 5:28
12. "30 Days" (Karaoke Version) – 3:05

== Charts ==
Chart performance for "30 Days"
Chart (2012)	Peak position
Euro Digital Song Sales (Billboard)	1
Ireland (IRMA)	13
Scotland (OCC)	2
UK Singles (OCC)	7

== Release history ==
List of release dates, record label and format details
Country	Date	Format	Label
Ireland	11 May 2012	Digital download	Polydor
United Kingdom	13 May 2012	Digital download	Polydor
United Kingdom	14 May 2012	CD single	Polydor
