= Ego (The Saturdays song) =

2010 single by the Saturdays

Single by The Saturdays

from the album Wordshaker
- B-side: "Flashback"
- Released: 3 January 2010 (digital); 4 January 2010 (physical)
- Recorded: 2009
- Studio: Rokstone (London, England)
- Genre: Electropop
- Length: 3:11 (single version); 3:00 (album version)
- Label: Fascination; Polydor
- Songwriters: Steve Mac; Ina Wroldsen; Rhys Barker
- Producer: Steve Mac

The Saturdays singles chronology
| "Forever Is Over" (2009) | "Ego" (2010) | "Missing You" (2010) |

Music video
- "Ego" on YouTube

"Ego" is a song by English-Irish girl group The Saturdays from their second studio album, Wordshaker. It was released on 4 January 2010 as the second and final single from the album. It was later included on their EP Headlines! (2010). The song is a strong electropop song. The song was written by Steve Mac and co-written by Ina Wroldsen and Rhys Barker, who has previously worked on the band's singles. The song was produced by Steve Mac. It was released onto radio station on 25 November 2009.

The single was released by Fascination and Polydor Records on 3 January 2010 as the second single from Wordshaker. It was accompanied by a B-side entitled "Flashback", written and produced by Steve Mac. The Saturdays collaborated with Ina Wroldsen and Rhys Barker again, The song has prominent electropop, dance-pop and synthpop genre characteristics. Its lyrics refer to a former relationship with someone who has a big ego.

The music video accompanying "Ego" was directed by Mike Simpson and Robin Van Calcar and premiered on YouTube on 17 November 2009. The video features the Saturdays in superhero outfits, many meetings where the paparazzi are trying to interview a member of the group. "Ego" was performed by the Saturdays as part of their setlist on the Headlines! Tour. The band also appeared on Dancing on Ice, GMTV and Blue Peter.

== Background ==
In an interview with HitQuarters, Steve Mac described how he, Ina Wroldsen and Rhys Barker created the track together,

"We were searching for sounds and found the basic hook sound that's in the verse and carries all the way through. I started playing along to it and then Ina started singing along, and the song was written over that. No drums were ever put down. Once we finished writing the song together, Ina laid a guide vocal over the top of the keyboard sound and then went away and left me and Rhys to do the rest of it. So it really was built from that sound. It's an Eurythmics kind of sound."

Mac also acknowledged the influence of producer RedOne's work with Lady Gaga, "There's no question that without Gaga we wouldn't be where we are at the moment, with what Red has done and how he has changed radio in America, and what's acceptable, and where dance is." "Ego" follows a chord progression of: Bm-G-D-Bm-G.

On 12 October 2009, "Ego" was revealed on BBC Radio 1 as the Saturdays' seventh official single and the second and final official single to be released from their second studio album Wordshaker which was released on the same date. The band recorded a newly song for the singles B-side which was later titled "Flashback", which was recorded on 19 October and on the same day, the single's release date of 14 December, was announced. On 17 November, however, the physical release date of "Ego" was pushed back and confirmed for release on 4 January 2010. The band decided that "Ego" would be the final single from their second studio album. Rochelle Wiseman backed the album by saying "We are not releasing any more singles from the album, as we want to release a new album, not because there is no more good songs on the album." as there were people questioning the album's songs.

== Critical reception ==
Carla Pearce of FemaleFirst mentioned that the single "Combines infectious synthesised riffs with a thumping beat to create a riot of a track that will no doubt become another smash hit." Nick Levine of Digital Spy award the song 3/5 stars describing the chorus as "catchy enough". UpdateTheBeat stated that "Ego" was a "women-empowerment" and it has the potential to be a number-one single! They went on to say, "The heavy beat is the first thing to strike you, as the girls warble away chanting: "You need to have a sit down with your ego!" If I was to describe the song in one word it would have to be- confident. Confident. CONFIDENT- oh that was three..." They also went on to say that the girls have "clearly matured" and became more "willing to be more deep in their songs", he always stated the Vanessa stole the song with her powerful vocals. And finally stated that "Ego" is definitely the stand out track on the album. DirrtyRemixes.com stated that the single is "amazing" and "just can't stop playing it!" They also gave their views over the B-side, saying that the song is not the best song, but it has good potential. But the quality of "Ego" is amazing!

== Chart performance ==
After the release of the band's album, Wordshaker, "Ego" was known to be the stand out track and charting into the Top 100 on the UK Singles Charts, until the song was announced as a single. When the song was announced as a single, the single started climbing its way up the charts. The song first charted on the UK Top 40 Singles in November, after the singles music video was released, later when the single was released in early 2010, the song charted within the top 10, charting at number-nine. The single gained a certification of Silver in the UK, and to date is the Saturdays third best selling single selling 340,000 copies, after "Up" and "What About Us". The second week of January, "Ego" placed itself at number 10 on the Irish Singles Charts, becoming the band's third top 10 hit in the country. "Ego" also charted on the Scottish Singles Charts, charting at number eight, but dropping to eleven a week later.

== Music video ==
=== Background ===
A frame of the Saturdays in the music video for "Ego", showing their superhero outfits.

The music video for "Ego" was shot on 23 October 2009 in the United Kingdom, and the final edit of the music video was released on 17 November 2009. The music video was directed by Mike Simpson & Robin Van Calcar and produced by MrsGrey productions. The band took on a superheroes theme and throughout the whole video the band were dressed as superheroes. David Leighton did all the choreography of the music video. The band are seen in many different scenes, some scenes are in a house, some are at a press conference, and many where the band are standing together. The music video has been compared to Watchmen, as the video is set to be in 1985. The male, main role in the music video is played by Waz Ashayer, who is a model, and became famous after appearing on Make Me a Supermodel. The music video features the album's version of the song.

=== Synopsis ===
As the video starts, Vanessa is seen singing to a picture of what appears to be a superhero team made of the Saturdays and an extra male. Vanessa looks out of her apartment window, to see a press conference centred on the man. The video then skips to Una standing in an alleyway where a poster of the male is put up over an older poster of the Saturdays and the male. Una rips this down and sets it on fire using her superpower. It is obvious from this that the man has betrayed the Saturdays and they want revenge. Una's power also causes the real man to start to heat up and become uncomfortable. The scene switches to Frankie, now hidden amongst the paparazzi at the press conference. She uses her superpowers to amplify the camera's flash to dazzle the man. As the second chorus kicks in, Vanessa displays telekinetic power, being able to pull and push the man around from a distance. This causes him to flee and try to escape in a car. Rochelle stops the car from moving with her superpower stopping the man from escaping. He then runs down an alleyway. Mollie flies down from the top of a building and blows the man back down the alleyway. The video closes with the Saturdays walking calmly down a deserted road with the man crawling pathetically backwards from the girls.

=== Reception ===
Rickified of dirrtyinc.com said he was disappointed with the music video, and he never expected it to be so boring, after he stated, "An utter boring vid, as I've expected a dance sequence since this song is rather uptempo and packs with a punch. I just don’t get it why the marketing team would marred this song with such horrible execution." Vanessa White told Digital Spy: "It's completely different to everything we've done so far, there's a lot of proper acting in it".

== Promotion ==
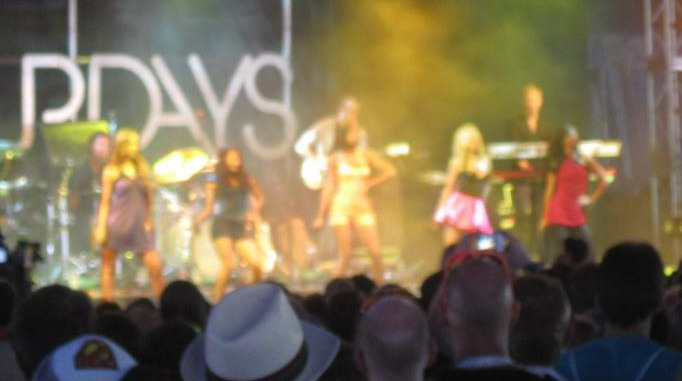
The Saturdays performing Ego at V Festival

The Saturdays first promoted the single at their album launch party. They later appeared BBC Switch Live, to promote the newly single, which gained a lot of downloads for the song. Just before Christmas Day, the band appeared on Blue Peter where they performed the song to help promote it. They appeared on late night talk-show, Alan Carr: Chatty Man, and performing in front of thousands on Dancing on Ice. They later appeared on GMTV performing "Ego" with a twist, as it was leading up to Christmas, the band perform a Christmas twist to it. And they performed the song on Ant & Dec's Christmas Show.

== Track listing ==
CD single (Released 4 January 2010)

1. "Ego" (Single Mix) — 3:10
2. "Flashback" — 3:15

iTunes download bundle (Released 3 January 2010)

1. "Ego" (Single Mix) — 3:10
2. "Ego" (Almighty Club Mix) — 6:59
3. "Ego" (Jason Nevins Club Mix) - 6:10
4. "Ego" (Almighty Radio Edit) - 4:16

Revamped version

1. "Ego" (Single Mix) - 3:10
2. "Flashback" — 3:15
3. "Ego" (Almighty Radio Edit) - 4:16
4. "Ego" (Jason Nevins Radio Edit) - 2:43
5. "Ego" (Almighty Club Mix) - 6:59
6. "Ego" (Jason Nevins Club Mix) - 6:09

== Charts ==
| Chart (2010) | Peak position |
|---|---|
| Ireland (IRMA) | 10 |
| Scottish Singles Sales (Official Charts) | 8 |
| UK Singles (Official Charts) | 9 |

=== Year-end charts ===
| Chart (2010) | Position |
|---|---|
| UK Singles (Official Charts Company) | 86 |

== Certifications ==
| Region | Certification | Certified units/sales |
|---|---|---|
| United Kingdom (BPI) | Platinum | 600,000^{‡} |
^{‡} Sales+streaming figures based on certification alone.
