= Gentleman (The Saturdays song) =

Single by The Saturdays

from the album Living for the Weekend
- B-side: "Wildfire"
- Released: 28 June 2013
- Length: 3:43
- Label: Fascination; Polydor
- Songwriter(s): Priscilla Renea Hamilton; Lukas Nathanson; Scott Effman
- Producer(s): Ambience

The Saturdays singles chronology
"What About Us" (2012)	"Gentleman" (2013)	"Disco Love" (2013)

Music video
- "Gentleman" on YouTube

"Gentleman" is a song recorded by British-Irish girl group The Saturdays from their fourth studio album Living for the Weekend (2013). It was released on 30 June 2013 as the third single from the album. It was written by Priscilla Renea, Lukas Nathanson and Scott Effman, with production by Ambience. The song hears the five-piece claim that finding a gentleman is difficult in the present day as compared to the 1990s.

The Saturdays promoted the single around the UK and appeared on a number of different chat shows including Daybreak and Lorraine. They also appeared on Steve Wright's BBC Radio 2 show with Patrick Kielty on Thursday 27 June to promote the single. Other appearances include BBC Radio 1's Big Weekend on 25 May and at Capital FM's Summertime Ball at Wembley Stadium on 9 June and This Morning on 28 June 2013.

== Background ==
"Gentleman"

On 4 May 2013, the group posted a 15-second clip as a preview on their Official Twitter account. On 7 May 2013, the group revealed on their Twitter page that the track would get its first play on radio on 9 May. On 8 May 2013, the track was leaked online in full a day ahead of the premiere. The single premiered on Capital Breakfast on 9 May as scheduled.

== Reception ==
Idolator blogger Sam Lansky described the song as a "funky little tune, with a spoken-word bit that evokes Girls Aloud built around the following largely inexplicable hook". But, went on to comment that he found the track's sound dated. US blogger Perez Hilton found the song decent and their voices pretty, but felt that the lyrics were confusing. Sara D. Anderson of PopCrush found the chorus was catchy but slightly irritable with the spoken-word style. She went on to question why the girls weren't using their "killer voices and harmonies". She concluded her review stating that the single overall falls flat. Linds Foley of Sugarscape commented that the single reminded her of Little Mix.

== Music video ==
The accompanying video premiered on The Saturdays' Vevo channel at midnight on 22 May 2013. It sees the group dressed up as glamorous housewives, possibly a reference to the American comedy-drama Desperate Housewives, and their male love interests in masculine suits and hats. The video received over 1 million views in its first week. The behind-the-scenes video was uploaded on 10 June 2013.

== Formats and track listings ==
UK CD single

(Released 30 June 2013)

1. "Gentleman" – 3:42
2. "Wildfire" (written by The Saturdays and The Alias) – 3:37

EP – digital download

(Released 28 Jun 2013)

1. "Gentleman" – 3:42
2. "Gentleman" (The Alias Radio Edit) – 3:25
3. "Gentleman" (Signature's Back To the 90's Radio Edit) – 3:51
4. "Gentleman" (2nd Adventure Radio Edit) – 3:49
5. "Wildfire" (only available through pre-order) – 3:37

(Remixes) – EP

(Released 28 Jun 2013)

1. "Gentleman" (Focus SOS Remix) – 3:15
2. "Gentleman" (The Alias Club Mix) – 6:28
3. "Gentleman" (Signature's Back To the 90's Vocal Remix) – 6:00
4. "Gentleman" (2nd Adventure Club Mix) – 6:13

Revamped Version

1. "Gentleman" – 3:42
2. "Wildfire" – 3:37
3. "Gentleman" (The Alias Radio Edit) – 3:25
4. "Gentleman" (Signature's Back To the 90's Radio Edit) – 3:51
5. "Gentleman" (2nd Adventure Radio Edit) – 3:49
6. "Gentleman" (Focus SOS Remix) – 3:15
7. "Gentleman" (The Alias Club Mix) – 6:28
8. "Gentleman" (Signature's Back To the 90's Vocal Remix) – 6:00
9. "Gentleman" (2nd Adventure Club Mix) – 6:13

== Charts ==
Chart (2013)	Peak position
Ireland (IRMA)	28
Scotland (OCC)	10
UK Singles (OCC)	14

== Release history ==
Country	Date	Format	Label
United Kingdom	9 May 2013	Radio airplay	Fascination Records
United Kingdom	30 June 2013	Digital download	Fascination Records
Ireland	28 June 2013	Digital download	Polydor Records
