= Forever Is Over =

2009 single by the Saturdays

Single by the Saturdays

from the album Wordshaker
- B-side: "I Can't Wait"
- Released: 5 October 2009
- Recorded: 2009
- Studio: Homesite 13 (Novato, California); Henson Recording (Hollywood, California)
- Genre: Pop rock
- Length: 3:24
- Label: Polydor
- Songwriters: Samuel Watters; Louis Biancaniello; James Bourne
- Producers: Louis Biancaniello; Sam Watters

The Saturdays singles chronology
"Work" (2009)	"Forever Is Over" (2009)	"Ego" (2010)

Music video
- "Forever Is Over" on YouTube

"Forever Is Over" is a song by English-Irish girl group the Saturdays, from their second studio album, Wordshaker. The song was released by digital download on 5 October 2009 as the lead single from the album. The song was written by Louis Biancaniello, Kahmarl Gordon, Sam Watters, James Bourne and produced by the Runaways. It was later included on their EP Headlines! (2010).

The single peaked at number two on the UK Singles Chart, tying their Comic Relief cover of Depeche Mode's "Just Can't Get Enough" as their highest-charting single at the time. It also reached number nine on the Irish Singles Chart.

Overall, the single gained positive reviews from critics, Digital Spy stated the song was "shifting away from glossy electropop and taking a few stiletto steps into pop rock territory", TeenToday stated the song had a "A killer soar of a chorus", and WessexScene stating that it was "It is vocally impressive".

== Background ==
"Forever Is Over" was revealed as the title for the group's second album's lead single on 25 July. A sixty-second preview of track was premiered on 22 August with the full song premiering on radio the following day.

"Forever Is Over" was originally written for former American Idol winner Kelly Clarkson by former Busted and Son of Dork star James Bourne and production group, the Runaways, who is well known for their writing for the likes of Jordin Sparks' single "Battlefield" and other songs for Natasha Bedingfield, Beyoncé, Alexandra Burke and Leona Lewis. Group member Mollie King explained to the Daily Star how the group came to record it instead:

We heard the song playing while at our record company and went into the office where James was talking to the head of the label. We said: 'We have to have that song!' Then we found out that Kelly Clarkson was fighting for it but he gave it to us. James is lovely.

The song was also wanted by American pop rock artist Pink.

The single was accompanied by a B-side entitled "I Can't Wait" which was co-written by the Saturdays together with Hannah Robinson and producers Ben Macklin, Julian Peake and Richard Stannard. David Balls of entertainment website Digital Spy said of the b-side "Another decent B-side from the girls [...] A laid-back electro poppy offering that recalls the more subdued moments from their debut album."

== Critical reception ==
Nick Levine from Digital Spy said "'Forever Is Over' finds them shifting away from glossy electropop and taking a few stiletto steps into pop rock territory," and further describing the song as having a "Big, beltalong chorus that hits its target, and that Una Healy shines on the guitary middle 8." The BBC Chart Blog elaborated on the single as being in the "Highest realms of the UK pop league up there with the Pixie Lotts and Girls Alouds of the world," further describing it as sounding "Slick" and "Big" with a "Mahoosive, dancealong, brilliant chorus." Musosguide reviewed "Forever Is Over" as a "Deliciously catchy tune that marks a welcome return to the electric guitar to a pop market that is saturated beyond recognition with electro-sounds." OK! Magazine labelled the song as "An infectious synth pop tune". Muumuse.com had the following to say: "Radio-friendly doesn't even begin to describe it - the chorus is simply massive." TheChemistryIsDead.com described "Forever Is Over" as "Rockier than their other stuff but it's very sleek and polished." WessexScene.co.uk reviewed the single as "A sophisticated more pop rock breakaway from the girls' previous pure pop style and has a more transatlantic feel to it" further saying that "It is vocally impressive."

Entertainment-focus.com reviewed the lead single as "A slow-building pop stormer and that all five girls sharing vocals adds a harder edge to their normally polished pop sound." Whilst Yahoo! Music's view of track included it having "Sultry verses and a full throttle chorus which suggests a new, more sophisticated direction to put them on par with their rivals."

Una Healy takes the first verse and the middle 8 in the song. The first bridge is shared by Rochelle Wiseman and Mollie King, while the chorus is sung by Vanessa White. The second verse is sung by Wiseman as the second bridge is sung by Frankie Sandford and White. White also closes the song.

== Promotion ==
The single was also performed at various British music festivals and on various television shows as promotion during its release period. On 12 September, "Forever Is Over" was played live for the first time at the Annual Freedom Festival held in Hull. Later that month, on 28 September, the group was interviewed on The Paul O'Grady Show where they performed "Forever Is Over" for the first time on live television. On 3 October, a day before the release of "Forever Is Over," the girls performed at G-A-Y in London. A day after the single's physical CD release, the band performed the song on ITV1's This Morning. On the same day the girls were interviewed on The 5:19 Show where an exclusive acoustic performance of "Forever Is Over" was recorded. The group then appeared on 12 October for a performance of the song on The Alan Titchmarsh Show. 17 October, the group performed at the Hollyoaks Music Festival which saw the group perform "Forever Is Over" as well the title track from their second album. 6 November, the group performed at the premiere of Disney film A Christmas Carol alongside R&B singer songwriter Taio Cruz and on 14 November the girls performed at "The Christmas Lights" at Cheshire Oaks. On 29 November the girls performed "Forever Is Over" on T4's Stars of 2009 alongside British hip hop trio N-Dubz at Earl's Court in London.

== Music video ==
A frame of the Saturdays in the music video for "Forever Is Over", Top image showing some of the band dancing in the car. Second image show Una delete the L off Lover to make Over and the end image showing all the band leave the club.

=== Background ===
"Forever Is Over" was accompanied by a music video for its single release. The music video was shot in London, United Kingdom, the video was shot on 29 July 2009. The music video was directed by Trudy Bellinger, who has previously worked with label mates and rival girl group, Girls Aloud. The video consists of the band going through a heart break, and they are trying to get over it. The video features different scenes, from being in a house to, being in a club and cinemas.

=== Synopsis ===
The video starts with King swinging around on a chair, then goes through all of the band's members with a close up shot. As Healy starts singing, she is at a window, and it is images outside of the window, with raindrops on the window, goes inside of the house, where she is seen sitting playing with the blinds at the window. The band are pictures at the Cinema trying to cheer Healy up after she's had her heart broke, eventually the band start having a laugh by throwing popcorn at her. Sandford and Wiseman are seen putting the phone down on their boyfriends after singing the lyrics, "there's nothing left to say". As the chorus kicks in, White is seen walking out of the house, slamming the door, singing the lyrics, "forever is over", which means she's left her boyfriend, she has had enough. The band start smashing and throwing things as they are angry with their ex-boyfriends. Wiseman is later seen having lunch with her boyfriend, which she is not very happy about and starts pulling faces, and later throws her glass of wine over him, and throws her engagement ring away. We later see her throwing a glass. Sandford is also seen trying to phone her boyfriend, but he does not pick up the phone, and she puts her head against the wall, and King comes comfort her by putting her arm around her. There are scenes where Healy and Wiseman begin to cook cakes in the kitchen, and where all the band are dancing in the car. Healy is seen typing 'Lover' into her laptop, but then deletes the L so it spells 'Over'. As the video comes to an end, the band are seen in a night club dancing, then leaving the club.

Sandford sported a wig in the music video, as her hair at time of recording and release was cut in an asymmetric crop.

=== Reception ===
WearePopSlags state that the video is "fun", stating that, you won't get bored of watching it as there is so much going on within it. They went on to label the video as "hot", and saying they are "striking while the iron is hot", meaning they are going to get a lot out while they can, because they are big at the moment. MUUMUSE stated, "The time between the 2:30 and 2:45 mark is all you really need to get the good stuff."

== Chart performance ==
"Forever Is Over" debuted and peaked on the Irish Singles Chart, issued on 8 October, at number nine. On 11 October "Forever Is Over" debuted and peaked at number two on the UK Singles Chart. It was kept off the top spot by Chipmunk's "Oopsy Daisy". In Scotland, the single also entered at number two and the following week dropped to number six.

== Track listings ==
CD single (Release 5 October 2009)

1. "Forever Is Over" (Radio Edit) - 3:24
2. "I Can't Wait" - 3:44

Digital single (Release 4 October 2009)

1. "Forever Is Over" (Radio edit) - 3:24
2. "Forever Is Over" (Buzz Junkies Remix Edit) - 7:04

iTunes Single 1 (Release 4 October 2009)

1. "Forever Is Over" (Radio Edit) - 3:24
2. "Forever Is Over" (Manhattan Clique Remix) ^{a} - 6:14

iTunes Single 2 (Release 4 October 2009)

1. "Forever Is Over" (Buzz Junkies Remix) - 7:04
2. "Forever Is Over" (Manhattan Clique Dub) - 5:25
3. "Forever Is Over" (Buzz Junkies Piano Dub) - 7:03

Revamped version

1. "Forever Is Over" (Radio Edit) - 3:24
2. "I Can't Wait" - 3:43
3. "Forever Is Over" (Buzz Junkies Edit) - 3:56
4. "Forever Is Over" (Manhanttan Clique Edit) - 3:41
5. "Forever Is Over" (Buzz Junkies Remix) - 7:03
6. "Forever Is Over" (Manhattan Clique Remix) - 6:14
7. "Forever Is Over" (The Deealer Remix) - 3:37

^{a} This remix of the song appears on versions of the album bought from HMV as a bonus track.

== Charts ==
=== Weekly charts ===
Chart (2009)	Peak position
Europe (European Hot 100 Singles)	9
Ireland (IRMA)	9
Scottish Singles Sales (Official Charts)	2
Slovakia Airplay (ČNS IFPI)	92
UK Singles (Official Charts)	2

=== Year-end charts ===
Chart (2009)	Position
UK Singles (OCC)	125

== Certifications ==
Region	Certification	Certified units/sales
United Kingdom (BPI)	Silver	200,000^{‡}
^{‡} Sales+streaming figures based on certification alone.

== Release history ==
Region	Date	Format	Label	Ref.
United Kingdom and Ireland	4 October 2009	Digital download	Fascination, Polydor	
United Kingdom and Ireland	5 October 2009	CD	Fascination, Polydor	
