= What About Us (The Saturdays song) =

Single by The Saturdays featuring Sean Paul

from the album Living for the Weekend and the EP Chasing the Saturdays
- B-side: "Somebody Else's Life" (Acoustic)
- Released: 18 December 2012
- Recorded: 2012
- Genre: Dance-pop; electropop
- Length: 3:24; 3:40 (featuring Sean Paul)
- Label: Fascination; Polydor
- Songwriters: Camille Purcell; Ollie Jacobs; Philip Jacobs
- Producer: Ollie Jacobs

The Saturdays singles chronology
"30 Days" (2012)	"What About Us" (2012)	"Gentleman" (2013)

Sean Paul singles chronology
"She Makes Me Go" (2012)	"What About Us" (2012)	"Other Side of Love" (2013)

Music video
- "What About Us" on YouTube "What About Us (ft. Sean Paul)" on YouTube

"What About Us" is a song by British-Irish girl group The Saturdays. It was released in the United States and Canada on 18 December 2012 as the group's debut single in America, being the lead single from their American-exclusive EP, Chasing the Saturdays (2013). It was released in the United Kingdom on 16 March 2013 as the second single from their fourth studio album Living for the Weekend (2013).

Two different versions of the track were released: a solo version, which was released exclusively in the US and Canada, and a version featuring Jamaican rapper Sean Paul, which was released internationally. Music critics gave the song positive feedback, but questioned the heavily auto-tuned chorus and the move away from the group's traditional sound.

A music video was released for the song was released via The Saturdays' Vevo account on 11 January 2013. The video was filmed in Los Angeles, where the band were filming their US reality series, Chasing the Saturdays.

The Saturdays went on to a promotional tour in the United States, as they appeared on a number of different chat shows including The Tonight Show with Jay Leno, The Jeff Probst Show, Fashion Police, Chelsea Lately and The Today Show in New York City. They would also visit radio stations around the UK.

"What About Us" gained commercial success, debuting at number one on the UK Singles Chart, as well as reaching the top ten in Ireland, Scotland, Poland and Hungary. It would become the group's twelfth UK top 10 single and first ever number-one. The song became the eleventh fastest-selling single of 2013 there. As of 2024, this is the group's only number one single in the United Kingdom.

== Background ==
In 2012, it was announced that the Saturdays had starred in their own reality television programme, Chasing the Saturdays, broadcast through E! Network. While filming their show, the band began visiting the recording studio, where they began work with Rodney "Darkchild" Jerkins. The band had also been working with Demi Lovato there.

The Saturdays would also sign a label deal in the United States. They thanked their new labels for making the group feel more welcome.

An acoustic version of "Somebody Else's Life", which can be heard on the opening titles of the show, was released as a B-side to the single.

== Composition ==
"What About Us"

"What About Us" was produced by Ollie Jacobs and was written by Jacobs, Camille Purcell and Philip Jacobs. The track is a dance-pop song. Before the release of the song, Mollie King said that the band were excited to release the track, as they had the song "for months". The band said they didn't want to change their genre just for the American public and would stick to their roots.

King said that the track is reggae pop, and a little different from what the band would usually record. However, she also mentioned the track being really "dancey".

When Una Healy was asked what "What About Us" was about, she said that she didn't know what the song was exactly about, mentioning that she thought "it's all about someone driving you crazy."

"What About Us" is the only collaboration on the album. The original version of the track lasts 3 minutes and 24 seconds, whereas the version which features Jamaican rapper Sean Paul lasts 3 minutes and 40 seconds.

== Release ==
The band said that they chose "What About Us" to be the lead single in the US as it gave them a "really good feeling". They also said it is a fresh start for the album, highlighting its "reggae vibe". The Saturdays would compliment Sean Paul, saying he was "perfect" for the UK version of the song, also mentioning he was "just so nice".

"What About Us" was confirmed to be the group's first single to be released in North America, and would be released on 18 December 2012 to coincide with their American reality show, Chasing the Saturdays. The band teased the song, saying that it is a pop track, and that it would be a good indication of the album. They've added that they've paired up with Diane Warren to record ballads besides pop songs. It was also revealed that the track would be the lead single from the band's extended play, Chasing the Saturdays, which was named after the show. Some critics said that releasing "What About Us" as the lead single from an EP for the US market was a "wise decision", with a critic mentioning that if the respective show had not been commercially successful, it would be "setting them up for failure".

In the United Kingdom, it was revealed that "What About Us" would be the follow-up single to "30 Days". The band announced that another single (which would be "Gentleman"), would be released before the album. The band decided to release "What About Us" differently in the United Kingdom. In the UK, the song's music video would be released before the single. It would also be released on airplay.

In the United States, the song would be released solo, though it would be released with a feature from Sean Paul elsewhere. The single was released with the B-side of an acoustic version of "Somebody Else's Life", the opening theme to Chasing the Saturdays. The CD single, which was released on 18 March 2013, would feature the song.

"What About Us" was released as a digital download EP, including the single version which features Sean Paul, the solo version and the B-side. In North America, a remix EP was released on 18 December 2012.

During the release, Frankie Sandford became an ambassador for mental health after she had battled depression.

== Critical reception ==
"What About Us" received generally positive reviews from music critics. Robert Copsey of Digital Spy noted that a lyric sung by Rochelle Humes, "Oh, why are we are waiting so long? I'm suffocating", was in reference to "man-related drama", while pointing out the large amount of it in their reality series, Chasing the Saturdays. Although he would criticise the song for not being original, Copsey later went on to tip the band for their first number-one single, noting that he "would be happy to see the song at the top of the charts".

4Music described the song as an "electro-pop affair with a bucket-load of synths thrown in for good measure", although criticising the single choice for its American release. Idolator wrote a mixed review criticizing the track for lacking the group's signature style.

Jessica Sager from PopCrush also touched on the departure from their original sound, though highlighting it as "not necessarily in a bad way." She went on to praise Sean Paul's feature, saying his features "gives [the song] an air of authenticity and fun, but pretty much only during his own verses." She also criticised the group's "emulation" of Jamaican accents, as well as the heavy use of Auto-Tune in the chorus, mentioning that they "can actually sing well without it." She concluded the review by labeling the song as "generic" and "not the best the Saturdays have to offer", rating it two and a half stars out of five.

== Commercial reception ==
"What About Us" debuted at number 44 on the US Billboard Hot Dance Club Songs chart for the week dated 8 December 2012. This marks their first ever chart entry in the United States. It has since peaked at number twenty-seven. The song debuted at number 79 on the Canadian Hot 100, becoming the highest Canadian debut for a new artist in 2013.

The Saturdays admitted that they did not want to get their hopes up on debuting at number one on the UK Singles Chart, as they were beaten to number-one three times before with their singles "Just Can't Get Enough", "Forever Is Over" and "Missing You" respectively. However, it was revealed that the group had knocked Justin Timberlake's "Mirrors" off the number-one spot on the UK Singles Chart. This became the band's first ever number-one single in the United Kingdom. It also became Sean Paul's second number one in the United Kingdom after being featured on "Breathe" in 2003.

"What About Us" sold 114,000 copies in the first week of release, making it, at the time, the fastest selling single of 2013. The band said they were thrilled to be the UK's number-one with "What About Us". They went on to thank their fans for supporting the single.

"What About Us" debuted at number six on the Irish Singles Chart, marking the band's fifth top ten single in that country. "What About Us" made its debut at number thirty-six on the New Zealand Singles Chart.

In December 2013, Mollie King posted a photo on Instagram of a 500,000 sales plaque of the song.

== Music video ==
The music video for "What About Us" was filmed during the summer of 2012 in Los Angeles, while the Saturdays were filming their reality television series. The North American version of the video was released via the Saturdays' official Vevo account on YouTube on 11 January 2013. A variant of the video, featuring vocals and additional scenes of the women with Sean Paul, was later released on 5 February 2013.

== Live performances and promotion ==
The Saturdays appeared in a number of nightclubs throughout 2012 in the United States performing "What About Us" along other hits. On 14 January 2013, the group made their first televised performance of the single on The Tonight Show with Jay Leno. It was their first performance done on American television. On 16 January, the girls performed "What About Us" on The Today Show in New York City. Along with the performances, they appeared on chat shows such as Chelsea Lately, Daybreak, Fashion Police, Lorraine, The Jeff Probst Show, Loose Women, Alan Carr: Chatty Man, Sunday Brunch and What's Cooking? to promote the single.

== Track listings ==
US digital download

1. "What About Us" – 3:24

CD single

1. "What About Us" (featuring Sean Paul) – 3:40
2. "What About Us" – 3:24
3. "Somebody Else's Life" (Acoustic) – 3:18

US digital remixes EP

1. "What About Us" (Seamus Haji Radio Edit) – 3:06
2. "What About Us" (Seamus Haji Club Mix) – 6:35
3. "What About Us" (Seamus Haji Dub) – 6:49
4. "What About Us" (Guy Scheiman Radio Edit) – 3:59
5. "What About Us" (Guy Scheiman Club Mix) – 7:35
6. "What About Us" (Guy Scheiman Dub) – 7:20
7. "What About Us" (The Buzz Junkies Radio Edit) – 3:23
8. "What About Us" (The Buzz Junkies Club Mix) – 4:32
9. "What About Us" (featuring Sean Paul) – 4:32
10. "What About Us" (2nd Adventure Radio Edit) – 4:24
11. "What About Us" (2nd Adventure Club Mix) – 6:36

Digital Europe and Oceania EP

1. "What About Us" (featuring Sean Paul) – 3:40
2. "What About Us" (featuring Sean Paul) (The Buzz Junkies Radio Edit) – 3:23
3. "What About Us" (featuring Sean Paul) (Seamus Haji Radio Edit) – 3:37
4. "What About Us" (Guy Scheiman Radio Edit) – 3:58

UK digital remix EP

1. "What About Us" (Guy Scheiman Club Mix) – 7:35
2. "What About Us" (2nd Adventure Club Mix) – 6:36
3. "What About Us" (Seamus Haji Club Mix) – 6:35
4. "What About Us" (The Buzz Junkies Club Mix) – 4:32
5. "What About Us" (2nd Adventure Radio Edit) – 4:24

== Credits and personnel ==
- Ollie Jacobs – songwriter, producer, mixing
- Phillip Jacobs – co-writer
- Camille Purcell – co-writer
- The Saturdays – vocals
- Sean Paul – guest vocalist

"What About Us" was recorded in the Rollover Studios in London.

== Charts ==
=== Weekly charts ===
Chart (2012–13)	Peak position
Australia (ARIA)	14
Austria (Ö3 Austria Top 40)	57
Belgium (Ultratip Bubbling Under Flanders)	55
Belgium (Ultratip Bubbling Under Wallonia)	40
Canada Hot 100 (Billboard)	79
Euro Digital Song Sales (Billboard)	3
Germany (GfK)	44
Hungary (Rádiós Top 40)	2
Ireland (IRMA)	6
New Zealand (Recorded Music NZ)	27
Poland Airplay (ZPAV)	2
Scottish Singles Sales (Official Charts)	1
Slovakia Airplay (ČNS IFPI)	97
UK Singles (Official Charts)	1
US Hot Dance Club Songs (Billboard)	27
US Pop Digital Songs (Billboard)	50

=== Year-end charts ===
Chart (2013)	Position
Hungary (Rádiós Top 40)	34
UK Singles Chart	37

== Certifications ==
Region	Certification	Certified units/sales
New Zealand (RMNZ)	Gold	7,500^{*}
United Kingdom (BPI)	Platinum	600,000^{‡}
^{*} Sales figures based on certification alone.^{‡} Sales+streaming figures based on certification alone.

== Release and radio history ==
Region	Date	Format(s)	Label	Ref.
United States	18 December 2012	Digital download	Mercury	
United States	12 March 2013	Mainstream radio	Mercury	
Australia	15 March 2013	Digital download	Universal Music	
United Kingdom	17 March 2013	CD single, digital download	Polydor	
Denmark	18 March 2013	Digital download	Universal Music	
Germany	5 April 2013	Digital download	Universal Music	

== See also ==
- List of UK Singles Chart number ones of the 2010s
