= Alphabeat discography =

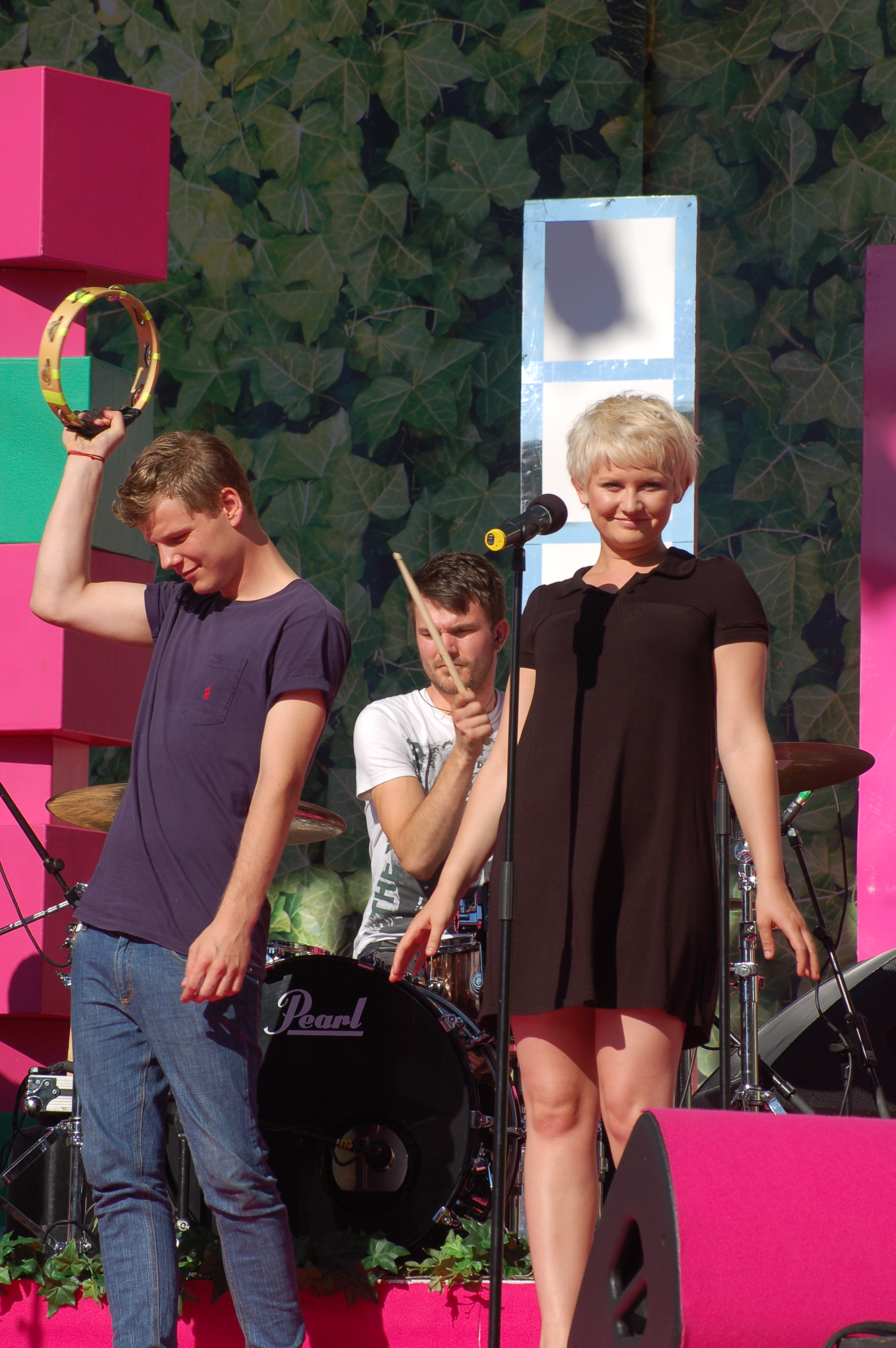
- Alphabeat performing in 2008
- Studio albums: 4
- Extended plays: 6
- Singles: 18
- Music videos: 18

The discography of Alphabeat, a Danish pop group, consists of four studio albums, six extended plays and 18 singles.

== Studio albums ==
Title	Details	Peak chart positions					Certifications
Title	Details	DEN	BEL	IRE	NLD	UK	Certifications
Alphabeat / This Is Alphabeat	Released: 5 March 2007 (DEN); Label: Copenhagen, EMI; Formats: CD, DD, vinyl	2	63	54	28	10	DEN: Platinum; UK: Gold
The Spell / The Beat Is...	Released: 26 October 2009 (DEN); Label: Copenhagen, Polydor; Formats: CD, DD	5	—	—	96	39	DEN: Platinum
Express Non-Stop	Released: 24 September 2012 (DEN); Label: Copenhagen; Formats: CD, DD	3	—	—	—	—	
Don't Know What's Cool Anymore	Released: 1 November 2019 (WW); Label: Warner; Formats: CD, DD, vinyl	9	—	—	—	—	
"—" denotes items that did not chart or were not released.

== Extended plays ==
Title	Details	Peak chart positions
Title	Details	UK
Napster Live Sessions EP	Released: 3 March 2008 (UK); Label: EMI; Format: DD	91
iTunes Live: London Sessions	Released: 4 March 2008 (UK); Label: EMI; Format: DD	—
iTunes Festival: London 2008	Released: 29 July 2008 (UK); Label: EMI; Format: DD	—
Love Sea – The Remix EP	Released: 16 October 2012 (WW); Label: Self-released; Format: DD	—
Shadows (Remixes) – EP	Released: 24 May 2019 (WW); Label: Warner; Format: DD	—
I Don't Know What's Cool Anymore (Remixes)	Released: 25 October 2019 (WW); Label: Warner; Format: DD	—
"—" denotes items that did not chart or were not released.

== Singles ==
Title	Year	Peak chart positions										Certifications	Album
Title	Year	DEN	AUT	BEL	GER	IRE	NLD	SWE	SWI	UK	US Dance	Certifications	Album
"Fascination"	2006	4	68	2	45	23	4	38	41	6	—	DEN: Platinum; UK: Platinum	Alphabeat / This Is Alphabeat
"10.000 Nights of Thunder"	2007	1	—	56	—	—	24	—	—	16	—	DEN: Platinum	Alphabeat / This Is Alphabeat
"Fantastic 6"	2007	—	—	—	—	—	—	—	—	—	—		Alphabeat / This Is Alphabeat
"Boyfriend"	2007	11	—	64	—	49	12	—	—	15	—	DEN: Platinum	Alphabeat / This Is Alphabeat
"Go-Go"	2008	14	—	—	—	—	—	—	—	—	—	DEN: Gold	Alphabeat / This Is Alphabeat
"What Is Happening"	2008	—	—	—	—	—	—	—	—	110	—		Alphabeat / This Is Alphabeat
"The Spell"	2009	1	—	56	—	—	11	—	—	20	—	DEN: Platinum	The Spell / The Beat Is...
"DJ"	2010	6	—	—	—	—	—	—	—	116	—	DEN: Gold	The Spell / The Beat Is...
"Hole in My Heart"	2010	—	—	—	—	—	—	—	—	29	—		The Spell / The Beat Is...
"Heat Wave"	2010	4	—	—	—	—	—	—	—	—	—	DEN: Gold	The Spell / The Beat Is...
"Vacation"	2012	15	—	—	—	—	59	—	—	—	—	DEN: Gold	Express Non-Stop
"Love Sea"	2012	10	—	—	—	—	—	—	—	—	—	DEN: Gold	Express Non-Stop
"X-Mas (Let's Do It Again)"	2012	—	—	—	—	—	—	—	—	—	—	DEN: Gold	Express Non-Stop
"Show Me What Love Is"	2013	—	—	—	—	—	—	—	—	—	—		Express Non-Stop
"Shadows"	2019	19	—	—	—	—	—	—	—	—	19	DEN: Gold	Don't Know What's Cool Anymore
"I Don't Know What's Cool Anymore"	2019	—	—	—	—	—	—	—	—	—	—		Don't Know What's Cool Anymore
"Sometimes 2020"	2020	—	—	—	—	—	—	—	—	—	—		Non-album single^{A}
"Danmarks Dynamite" (with Herrelandsholdet)^{B}	2021	12	—	—	—	—	—	—	—	—	—		Non-album single
"—" denotes items that did not chart or were not released.

== Music videos ==
Title	Year	Director
"Fascination"	2006	Johan Windfeld
"10,000 Nights of Thunder"	2007	Johan Windfeld
"Fantastic 6"	2007	
"Boyfriend"	2007	Daniel Eskils
"Fascination" (International version)	2008	Ben Dickinson
"10,000 Nights" (International version)	2008	Scott Lyon
"Boyfriend" (International version)	2008	Ben Dickinson
"What Is Happening"	2008	Toben Seymour
"The Spell"	2009	Toben Seymour
"Hole in My Heart"	2010	Chic & Artistic
"DJ (I Could Be Dancing)"	2010	Chic & Artistic
"Heat Wave"	2010	Chris Bjerremose
"Vacation"	2012	Michael Christensen
"Love Sea"	2012	Anders Reinholdt
"Shadows"	2019	Rasmus Nagel & Anders Reinholdt
"I Don't Know What's Cool Anymore"	2019	Rasmus Nagel & Anders Reinholdt
"Sing a Song"^{C}	2019	Rasmus Nagel & Anders Reinholdt
"Danmarks Dynamite"	2021	Rasmus Nagel & Anders Reinholdt

== Notes ==
A. "Sometimes 2020" is a remix of 2019 song "Sometimes". It does not feature on any official releases.
B. "Danmarks Dynamite" marks the band's first time singing in their native language. It serves as the official Danish song for the postponed 2020 UEFA Championship.
C. Whilst a video for "Sing a Song" was created, the song itself has not been released as a single.
