= The Sound of Arrows discography =

- Studio albums: 2
- Extended plays: 3
- Soundtrack albums: 2
- Singles: 7
- Music videos: 7
- Remixes: 14

The discography of the Sound of Arrows, a Swedish synth-pop duo composed of singer Stefan Storm and synth player Oskar Gullstrand, consists of two studio albums, three extended plays, seven singles, seven music videos, and a number of other appearances.

== Albums ==
List of albums, with selected details
Title	Details
Voyage	Released: 31 October 2011; Label: Skies Above; Formats: CD, digital download, vinyl
Stay Free	Released: 27 October 2017; Label: Skies Above; Formats: CD, digital download, vinyl

== Extended plays ==
List of extended plays, with selected details
Title	Details
Danger!	Released: 7 May 2008; Label: Labrador; Format: CD
M.A.G.I.C.	Released: 28 January 2009; Label: Labrador; Format: CD
EP I (Cuts from the Stay Free Vault)	Released: 21 September 2018; Labe: Skies Above; Format: digital download

== Singles ==
List of singles, showing year released and album name
Title	Year	Album
"Into the Clouds"	2009	Voyage
"Nova"	2011	Voyage
"Magic"	2011	Voyage
"Wonders"	2011	Voyage
"Beautiful Life"	2017	Stay Free
"In the Shade of Your Love"	2017	Stay Free
"Don't Worry"	2017	Stay Free

=== Digital downloads ===
List of songs, showing year released
Title	Year
"Dark Sun"	2009
"Nova" (II Figures Remix)	2011
"Nova" (Esben & the Witch Remix)	2011
"Disappear"	2011

== Music videos ==
List of music videos, showing year released and directors
Title	Year	Director(s)
"Into the Clouds"	2009	The Sound of Arrows and Mattias Erik Johansson
"Nova"	2011	—N/a
"Magic"	2011	Andreas Öhman and Oskar Gullstrand
"Wonders"	2011	The Sound of Arrows and Mattias Erik Johansson
"Conquest"	2011	Ernest Desumbila
"Beautiful Life"	2017	—N/a
"Don't Worry"	2017	Andreas Öhman

== Soundtracks ==
- "M.A.G.I.C." was used in a television commercial for the Mitsubishi Outlander vehicle by Mitsubishi Motors.
- The Fear of Tigers remix of "Into the Clouds" was used in a television commercial for the Peugeot 308 in Sweden.

== Remixes ==
The Sound of Arrows made remixes of the following songs:

Year	Song	Release
2008	Jonathan Johansson – "En Hand I Himlen"	
2008	Club 8 – "Jesus, Walk with Me"	
2009	Alphabeat – "Hole in My Heart"	was released on UK iTunes EP Hole in My Heart (Polydor Records, Fascination)
2009	Jamie Long – "Years"	
2009	Lisa Mitchell – "Oh! Hark!"	
2009	Penguin Prison – "Animal Animal"	
2010	The Naked & Famous – "Young Blood"	
2010	Lady Gaga – "Alejandro"	was released on the Remixes EP Alejandro & The Remix album (Interscope Records)
2011	Natalia Kills – "Zombie"	(Interscope Records)
2011	Nicole Scherzinger – "Right There"	was released on the Remixes EP Right There (Interscope Records)
2011	M'kay – "Rebellion"	
2012	Maroon 5 – "Payphone"	
2012	Royal Teeth – "Wild"	
2012	Alphabeat – "Love Sea"	was released on Love Sea – The Remix EP

"—" indicates a remix was not released.

Remixes of The Sound of Arrows songs:

- "Nova" was remixed by Tiësto and Esben and the Witch
