= Don't Know What's Cool Anymore =

Studio album by Alphabeat
- Released: 1 November 2019
- Recorded: September 2018 – July 2019
- Studio: Det Gule Hus; The Bank; Frostbox; Keller; Gæsten; Radisson Aarhus; Brun Box; White Room
- Genre: Pop
- Length: 26:43
- Label: Warner Music Denmark
- Producer: Anders SG; Anders Bønløkke; Emil Falk

Alphabeat chronology
Express Non-Stop (2012)	Don't Know What's Cool Anymore (2019)

Singles from Don't Know What's Cool Anymore
- 1. "Shadows" Released: 1 March 2019; 2. "I Don't Know What's Cool Anymore" Released: 30 September 2019

Don't Know What's Cool Anymore is the fourth and final studio album by Danish band Alphabeat, their first since 2012's Express Non-Stop. It was released on 1 November 2019 by Warner Music Denmark and is distributed by Absolute Label Services in the UK and Atlantic Records in the US.

== Background and promotion ==
=== Singles ===
After a 6-year hiatus, Alphabeat announced their return on 1 March 2019 with the single "Shadows". At the same time, they announced plans for a fourth studio album, citing a release window of October 2019. In Denmark, "Shadows" reached number 19 on the singles chart and was certified Gold.

An EP of "Shadows" remixes was released on 24 May, containing reworkings by Alphalove, F9, Until Dawn and Country Club Martini Crew. An acoustic recording of the track was released 14 June, followed by a UK radio edit of the single on 10 September, mixed by "Fascination" and "10,000 Nights" producer Jeremy Wheatley. On 16 October, the UK edit was added to the BBC Radio 2 playlist.

On 30 August 2019, the band released the album's second single, "I Don't Know What's Cool Anymore". Alongside this, they announced the album itself with an expected release date of 1 November 2019.

On 25 October, a second remix EP was released for the single "I Don't Know What's Cool Anymore", containing tracks by Faustix, Alphalove and Initial Talk.

On 26 June 2020, Alphabeat released a reworking of the album track "Sometimes". Titled "Sometimes 2020", this version is produced by Dutch DJ Justus Schipper. Schipper later released his own re-working of the track, the "Justus Remix", on 30 July.

=== Music videos ===
Alphabeat released three music videos to accompany the release of Don't Know What's Cool Anymore.

The first, a clip for lead single "Shadows", was released 1 March 2019. A second, accompanying the band's second single "I Don't Know What's Cool Anymore", followed on 24 September. A third, for the album track "Sing A Song" premiered 16 November, however the track itself was not released as a single. All three of these videos were filmed, directed and edited by band members Anders Reinholdt and Rasmus Nagel.

=== Media appearances ===
In promotion of the album, and its respective singles, Alphabeat have appeared on various radio and television programmes, including performing "Shadows" on both the Danish version of reality TV series X Factor and British late-night talk show The Graham Norton Show. The group have also performed "I Don't Know What's Cool Anymore" on both the Danish and British versions of dance competition series Dancing with the Stars.

In the week leading up to the album's release, Bramsen and SG, alongside guitarist Anders Bønlokke, appeared on both BBC Radio Scotland and BBC Radio 2, the latter of which saw them performing acoustic versions of both "Shadows" and "Fascination". The trio also appeared on album review podcast Track by Track, discussing each song from the release with hosts Dan Bull and Will Warren. All six band members also featured on the cover of LGBT magazine QX and Scandinavian lifestyle magazine Scan.

On 2 November, Alphabeat played a medley of their hits as part of the 2019 Crown Prince Couple's Awards ceremony, aired live on Danish television. The group performed "I Don't Know What's Cool Anymore" and "Shadows", alongside classic hits "10,000 Nights", and "Fascination".

Following the album's release, on 3 November Danish radio station DR P7 Mix dedicated a whole day of programming to the band. The broadcast totaled seven hours and culminated in a live performance of "Don't Know What's Cool Anymore" in full, followed by hits "DJ", "The Spell" and "Fascination".

On 17 December 2019, the group appeared on TV 2's De Største Øjeblikke 2019 (English: The Greatest Moments 2019), performing album track "Back of My Bike" and single "Shadows".

=== Touring ===
The band have also supported the album through various live shows, including performing at SXSW in March 2019 and touring Denmark as part of Grøn Koncert during July 2019.

Throughout February 2020, the group were due to play a series of headline shows in their native country, with a tour of the United Kingdom following in April 2020. In June 2020, the group were also due to play Fredagsrock, the Friday-night concert event at Copenhagen amusement park Tivoli, and the London music festival Mighty Hoopla.

Owing to the COVID-19 pandemic, however, several of the band's 2020 dates were either cancelled or rescheduled. In place of these cancelations, the group performed "the only Alphabeat gig this Summer", a live-streamed concert atop the Radisson Collection Hotel, Royal Copenhagen on 26 June.

== Critical reception ==
Professional ratings
Review scores
Source	Rating
Classic Pop	4/5 stars
OK!	4/5 stars
Stereoboard	4/5 stars

Initial reception to the album was mostly positive, with celebrity culture website CelebMix calling the record "a non-stop, popular musical masterpiece packed full of intelligent, well-crafted and well-produced perfect pop hits". Music and entertainment website Essentially Pop too praised the record, naming it "a welcome breath of positivity in a worried world", whilst citing opening track "Shadows" as "high energy, fun, and effusive".

OK! gave the album 4/5 stars, claiming the listener "won't be able to help hitting the dancefloor and throwing some old school shapes", whilst New! gave a similarly positive review, claiming the album was "all killer, no filler". Review website Stereoboard too praised the record, noting that the album "heralds a return to the more organic aesthetic of... This Is Alphabeat" and calling it a "nine track gem"; the website gave the release a 4/5 star rating.

Music magazine Classic Pop was more critical, however, rating the album 4 stars. The publication praised the band's "timeless radio-friendly euphoria" but panned the short length of the album and the track "Sing a Song". Nordic music fansite Scandipop praised "Sing a Song", however, calling it "brutally honest but tongue-in-cheek", whilst commending the record as a whole for being "wall-to-wall, heart-on-its-sleeve, brilliant, unabashed pop".

== Track listing ==
Don't Know What's Cool Anymore track listing
No.	Title	Writer(s)	Length
1.	"Shadows"	Anders SG; Anders Bønløkke; Stine Bramsen	2:45
2.	"I Don't Know What's Cool Anymore"	Bønløkke; SG; Bramsen; Emil Falk; Daniella Binyamin	3:10
3.	"Back of My Bike"	SG; Bønløkke; Bramsen; Falk	2:46
4.	"Goldmine"	Bønløkke; SG	3:18
5.	"Sing a Song"	Bønløkke; SG; Bramsen	3:06
6.	"Sometimes"	Bønløkke; SG	3:05
7.	"Now You Know"	Bønløkke; SG	2:33
8.	"The Answer"	Bønløkke; SG; Bramsen	3:12
9.	"I'd Rather Die"	Bønløkke; SG	2:40
Total length:			26:43

== Personnel ==
Alphabeat

- Anders Bønløkke – guitar, backing vocals, writing, production
- Stine Bramsen – vocals, cowbell, writing
- Troels Møller – drums, backing vocals
- Rasmus Nagel – keyboards, backing vocals
- Anders Reinholdt – bass, backing vocals
- Anders SG – vocals, tamborim, writing, production

Additional personnel

- Emil Sebastian Albæk Falk – production, writing, backing vocals, additional instrumentation
- Daniela Binyamin – writing, backing vocals
- Elisabeth Eibye – photography
- Tom McKenzie – photography
- Henrik Siegel – cover design
- Mads Nilsson – mixing

== Charts ==
Chart performance for Don't Know What's Cool Anymore
Chart (2019)	Peak position
Danish Albums (Hitlisten)	9
UK Album Downloads (OCC)	56
UK Album Sales (OCC)	80
UK Physical Albums (OCC)	96
