= Vacation (disambiguation) =

A vacation or holiday is a recreational trip or a leave of absence from work.

Vacation may also refer to:

== Film and television ==
- National Lampoon's Vacation, a 1983 comedy film starring Chevy Chase
  - National Lampoon's Vacation (film series), a franchise based on the 1983 film
  - Vacation (2015 film), a continuation of the Vacation series
- Vacations (film), a 1947 Argentine film
- Vacation (2005 film), an Indian Malayalam-language film
- Vacation, a 2011 film starring Dean Cain
- Vacation (2022 film), a South Korean film
- "Vacation" (Call Me Kat), a 2021 television episode
- "Vacation" (The Golden Girls), a 1986 television episode
- "The Vacation" (Chowder), a 2008 television episode
- "The Vacation" (The Amazing World of Gumball), a 2014 television episode

== Music ==
- Vacations (band), an Australian indie rock band

=== Albums ===
- Vacation (Big Scary album), 2011
- Vacation (Bomb the Music Industry! album), 2011
- Vacation (The Go-Go's album) or the title song (see below), 1982
- Vacation (Seaway album), 2017
- Vacation, by Frenship, 2019
- Vacation, by Paces, 2016

=== Songs ===
- "Vacation" (Alphabeat song), 2012
- "Vacation" (Connie Francis song), 1962
- "Vacation" (Dirty Heads song), 2017
- "Vacation" (G.R.L. song), 2013
- "Vacation" (The Go-Go's song), 1982
- "Vacation" (Thomas Rhett song), 2016
- "Vacation" (Young Jeezy song), 2008
- "Vacation", by GFriend from Sunny Summer, 2018
- "Vacation", by Guttermouth from Gusto!, 2002
- "Vacation", by Superfruit from Future Friends, 2017
- "Vacation", by Takeoff from The Last Rocket, 2018
- "Vacation", by Jessie Woo, 2019
- "Vacation", by Tyga, 2020
- "The Vacation Song", by Shane Dawson, 2012

== Other uses ==
- Vacation (novel), a 2007 novel by Jeremy C. Shipp
- The Sims: Vacation, a 2002 expansion for the video game The Sims

== See also ==
- Holiday (disambiguation)
- Permanent Vacation (disambiguation)
- Annual leave, time granted off from work
- School holiday, a period during which schools are closed
- Spring break, a recess from studying in some countries
- Street vacation, a type of easement
- Summer vacation, a school holiday
- Tourism, travel for pleasure or business
- Vacated judgment, the act of overturning a court ruling
- Vacated victory, win stripped from an athletic team
