= Winding Roads =

Winding Roads may refer to:

- Winding Roads (film), the 1999 directorial debut of Theodore Melfi
- "Winding Roads", a song by the Sound of Arrows from the 2008 release Danger! (EP)
- "Winding Roads", a song by Stephen Marley from the 2023 album Old Soul
