= Interscope Geffen A&M Records =

American umbrella label owned by Universal Music Group

Interscope Geffen A&M
- Parent company: Universal Music Group (UMG)
- Founded: January 1, 1999; 27 years ago
- Distributors: Interscope Capitol Labels Group (United States); Polydor (United Kingdom and France); Universal Music Enterprises (reissues)
- Country of origin: United States
- Location: Santa Monica, California
- Official website: Official Interscope website

Interscope Geffen A&M Records (IGA) is an American umbrella label operating as a unit of Interscope Capitol Labels Group, owned by Universal Music Group. It currently consists of record labels Interscope Records and Geffen Records. It is one of the two umbrella labels that is a part of the Interscope Capitol Label Group, the other being Capitol Music Group.

== History ==
=== 1998–99: Universal Music merger and unit foundation ===
On December 10, 1998, Canadian distillery and conglomerate Seagram completed its seven-month $10.6 billion plan to acquire PolyGram. Shortly after, Seagram merged PolyGram with Universal Pictures; its music division was merged with recording labels under the music faction of MCA Inc. The expensive merger created what is today, the biggest major music company, Universal Music Group. On time for New Year's Day 1999, Universal Music combined the operations of MCA sister labels Interscope Records and Geffen Records with PolyGram subsidiary A&M Records. The combined labels were altogether consolidated into an umbrella unit known publicly as Interscope Geffen A&M Records. The label unit operated as one of the newly formed Universal Music Group's four umbrella companies; the other three being the Universal Motown Republic Group, Verve Records and The Island Def Jam Music Group. The reorganization, expected to produce $300 million in savings annually, was described by the Los Angeles Times as underscoring the "changing economics and direction of the music business." Interscope co-founders Jimmy Iovine and Ted Field were named co-chairmen of IGA at its launch.

=== 1999: A&M and DGC Records folding, lawsuit and staff layoffs ===
As a result of the merger, on January 22, three weeks after the PolyGram-UMG merger, both A&M Records and Geffen division DGC Records went dormant with a certainty of artists drafted to either Geffen or Interscope, while a significant percentage of artists and/or bands were dropped from A&M and Geffen. With Geffen now existing as the only active label under the IGA shade, over 280 jobs were eliminated (including 110 from Geffen) and A&M's former Charlie Chaplin studio/Jim Henson company lot offices were closed. Enraged, A&M co-founders Herb Alpert and Jerry Moss filed suit against Universal and parent company Seagram in June for breach of contract, citing a breach of the company's integrity clause following the merger of A&M into IGA and later dormancy. The lawsuit sought over $20 million in damages. The case was settled out of court in March 2003, in exchange for UMG considering A&M as an active one-off label of Interscope Records while its operations in the United Kingdom would be handled by Polydor Records, with sister label Island Records' UK division taking over Geffen's duties. Alpert and Moss received $200 million from Vivendi, a French mass media conglomerate which Seagram merged with in 2000 in exchange for acquiring Universal Pictures and its music division.

=== 2000–03: Recovery and dominance ===
As independent labels, A&M and Geffen were revered, having had achieved substantial commercial and artistic success. Both had been sold by their founders, however, and suffered from budget restraints and unproductive band signings over the previous years. At the time of the merger, neither labels had hit singles upon the top forties of Billboard charts while Interscope, in turn, had "defined the new sound of young America" with hit records from artists including Dr. Dre, Snoop Dogg, Tupac Shakur, Nine Inch Nails, No Doubt, Limp Bizkit, and Bush, among others. In 2000, thanks to growing integrity of IGA, Universal Music Group became the first music corporation to break the $1 billion mark in earnings before interest, taxes, depreciation, and amortization. The company held the top position in music sales with 28.03% market share, with Interscope being the top-selling Universal label, outperforming sister label Def Jam Recordings, with an 8.97% market share. By 2001, Interscope Geffen A&M began to recover commercially, despite the February departure of Ted Field. Over eighteen top forty Billboard hits occurred between the spring and summer of the year. Two of which, Eve's "Let Me Blow Ya Mind" became a top three Billboard Hot 100 hit, helping to garner her the first ever Grammy Award for Best Rap/Sung Collaboration a year later; No Doubt's "Hey Baby" cracked the top five of the chart by October and earned the band their Grammy Award for Best Pop Performance by a Duo or Group with Vocals in 2003. Eve is also known to be one of the five female hip hop rappers to have a number one album on the Billboard 200 with 1999's Let There Be Eve...Ruff Ryders' First Lady, also making her Interscope Geffen A&M's first, and thus far, only female rapper to have a number one Billboard 200 album in the label's catalogue, following the unit's inauguration that year. Meanwhile, No Doubt were recovering from the mediocre performance of their 2000 predecessor, Return of Saturn, with their fourth follow-up, Rock Steady, released on December 11, 2001, performing better, peaking within the top ten of the Billboard 200.

IGA's biggest success story would be immortalized when in 2002, rapper 50 Cent, who had been blacklisted and shot nine times in 2000, would sign to Interscope subsidiaries Shady Records and Aftermath Entertainment, respectively founded by labelmates Eminem and Dr. Dre. On February 9, 2003, he released his debut studio album, Get Rich or Die Tryin', having sold over thirteen million copies internationally with nine million being sold in the U.S. The success of the album garnered 50 Cent his own label, G-Unit Records, in a distribution deal with Interscope Geffen A&M Records, rather than a division deal.

=== 2003: Label mergers and absorptions ===
Throughout 2003, many sister labels were either acquired by UMG and later merged or folded into IGA. The first was MCA Records, which had been occupant since its 1934 foundation under the Decca Records banner. MCA's final album release was rapper Common's fifth studio album, Electric Circus, which was released in December 2002; the album's lukewarm commercial performance was the main factor and reason of MCA's demise and later absorption into Geffen Records, with not only Common being drafted to the label, but various artists at the time including Blink-182, Mary J. Blige, The Roots and Shaggy altogether being transferred into the imprint. Following president Jay Boberg's resignation, the merger between MCA and IGA completed in July 2003. Over seventy-five staffers were laid off following MCA's folding into Geffen. A month later, in August, DGC artists Beck and Sonic Youth would fully be drafted to the Geffen roster, following their completed imprint fulfillment, despite DGC having been inactive since 1999 following the IGA merger by Universal Music. Coincidentally, Universal Music acquired DreamWorks Records in October 2003, having permanently merged the label into Geffen. Artists including Papa Roach, Rise Against, Nelly Furtado, Lifehouse, AFI, the All-American Rejects, Jimmy Eat World and Rufus Wainwright were moved to the Geffen and/or Interscope imprints. Fatal results involving divisions or subsidiaries under DGC, MCA and DreamWorks resulted in transfers to mostly Geffen other than Interscope including Rawkus Records, Flawless Records and various others. Because of the DreamWorks Records merger into Geffen, DreamWorks Records Nashville was made into a spun-off subsidiary of Universal Music Group Nashville, as was MCA Nashville; DreamWorks Nashville was dissolved in 2005.

=== 2004–07: Label distribution deals, A&M re-emergence, G-Unit problems and Octone Records ===
In 2004, Star Trak Entertainment, a label run by production duo The Neptunes (Pharrell Williams and Chad Hugo), ended their partnership with Arista Records, shortly after the firing of its president, music executive L.A. Reid, which preceded the label's merger with RCA Records in reference to UMG's rival music company; RCA and Arista's parent Bertelsmann Music Group's merger with Sony Music that year. Because of this, Star Trak were searching for a new distribution deal until Iovine convinced Williams and Hugo to sign with Interscope, thus putting Star Trak under the IGA banner. The final result was Fam-Lay, Snoop Dogg and Slim Thug being a part of the Interscope or Geffen rosters through the Star Trak imprint. It quickly scored a number one hit through the Geffen banner by Snoop Dogg, "Drop It Like It's Hot".

Throughout 2005, the unit began to achieve alternative success from its A&M division with artists Black Eyed Peas, The Pussycat Dolls and Keyshia Cole. The former's album, Monkey Business, managed to sell three million copies, thanks in part to the success of "Pump It". Meanwhile, the latter's single, "(I Just Want It) To Be Over", managed to make the end of the top thirty of the Billboard R&B song chart. PCD's single, "Don't Cha", which was a leftover recorded by Tori Alamaze, also became a top three hit under IGA. However, the early stages of 2005 proved to be difficult for Interscope Geffen A&M as a violent feud between its breakout rappers 50 Cent and The Game reached a heavy peak following a radio station shooting. At the time, Game already released his debut album under G-Unit, Aftermath and Interscope, The Documentary, on January 18 with 50 Cent on schedule to release The Massacre that March. Although a truce between the two was settled, Game continuously went against IGA chairman Iovine's wishes, deciding to attack 50 and the entirety of G-Unit, using the catchphrase, "G-Unot". The feud between 50 Cent and the Game caused the latter to cut ties with G-Unit and Dr. Dre's Aftermath imprint, while later being transferred from Interscope to Geffen to remain under the Interscope Geffen A&M umbrella, being able to help Game avoid contractual obligations with G-Unit.

In 2006, producer Timbaland joined Interscope Geffen A&M in a label division deal through his imprint, Mosley Music Group, while helping the unit resign Nelly Furtado under his wing. The resulting collaboration was the single, "Promiscuous", which made its way to the radio market in April. Later that year, Geffen president Jordan Schur departed to form his own music label. In 2007, a reorganization commenced at IGA. DGC Records was revived as a direct subsidiary of the unit while A&M Records was revitalized as A&M Octone Records. With DGC, Beck, Weezer and Sonic Youth were brought back into the fold, while many of A&M's artists were moved to either Geffen or Interscope including the Black Eyed Peas. Those who stood under A&M or Octone, which had been sold off by Sony Music (formerly Sony BMG), were now under the guidance of A&M Octone through IGA; one of which was Maroon 5. A&M Octone was seen as a joint venture between the co-owners of Octone and IGA.

=== 2008–13: Extended success, 19 Entertainment partnership and A&M/Octone folding ===
IGA struck more success with pop singer Lady Gaga through her single, "Poker Face", which released in 2008.

In 2010, IGA and 19 Entertainment announced a strategic alliance to develop, distribute and globally market records by American Idol finalists and winning contestants. A year later, in May 2011, Ron Fair was one of the few executives related to Universal Music to part ways through its labels, having been a part of the IGA team as vice president of A&M Records from 2002 to 2007, before being chairman of Geffen until that time being. In October, Geffen was reorganized following Fair's departure, with music manager and former Atlantic Records A&R Gerald "Gee" Roberson being the label's chairman, having to report to IGA chairman Jimmy Iovine and relocating Geffen's operations from its UMG offices in Santa Monica, California to New York City. IGA scored more hits in 2012 with Imagine Dragons' "Radioactive", Carly Rae Jepsen's "Call Me Maybe" and Chief Keef's "I Don't Like". In 2013, following the release of the Game's fifth album, Jesus Piece, in December 2012, DGC Records went inactive with some of its remaining artists deferring back to either Interscope or Geffen. IGA fully acquired Octone Records. As a result, A&M Octone Records was absorbed into Interscope Records, with the entirety of its roster being deferred, finally ending the A&M label name completely while following suit with DGC.

=== 2014: Jimmy Iovine's departure, Dreamville partnership and John Janick takeover ===
Jimmy Iovine served as chairman and CEO of IGA until May 2014. He was succeeded by Fueled by Ramen co-founder John Janick, who had been a part of IGA as president and COO since 2012. This was during this period that a company reorganization concerning parent Universal Music Group was happening, of which not only Iovine departed from IGA, but its sister unit, the Island Def Jam Music Group was dismantled with Island, Def Jam and affiliated labels being autonomously solidified on their own.

Despite Janick's promotion to CEO of IGA, many artists felt discomforted including Keyshia Cole, 50 Cent, Beck, Chief Keef and Nelly Furtado. 50 Cent left Interscope Geffen A&M, taking his G-Unit imprint with him to sign with UMG sister label Capitol Records through its independent Caroline Records faction (now Virgin Music). Beck also followed suit, signing with Capitol as well. Cole's album, Point of No Return, performed underwhelmingly, causing her to get dropped from Interscope. Chief Keef was also released from his deal with Interscope after discontempt with Janick and refusal to release new music under his demand. Furtado, following a heated dispute with Janick, was released from Geffen Records, ending her tenure with Timbaland's Mosley Music imprint.

Later in 2014, IGA began to sign new talent. The three artists signed to the Interscope faction were Dreezy, Tory Lanez and Selena Gomez.

=== 2014–20: Commercial re-emergence and Geffen relaunch ===
Interscope Geffen A&M began to see more dominance with Lana Del Rey, whose sophomore studio album, Ultraviolence, managed to debut at number one on the Billboard 200 upon release that July. Then, in 2015, Kendrick Lamar, who had previously released Good Kid, M.A.A.D City, on October 23, 2012, helped the unit score another number one album with To Pimp a Butterfly. That year, Tory Lanez topped the Billboard R&B song chart with "Say It", bringing the unit an RIAA-certified platinum plaque. In March 2016, after nine years on a hiatus, No Doubt lead singer Gwen Stefani returned with the release of This Is What the Truth Feels Like. It managed to top the Billboard 200, despite 84,000 album-equivalent units sold in its first week, making it the lowest-equivalized number one album of that year under the unit. By the end of 2016, over five albums and eleven singles under IGA made its way to the Billboard Year-End charts.

With 2017 approaching, Kendrick Lamar scored his first number-one Hot 100 hit and IGA's first number one single that year with "Humble". That spring, IGA relaunched Geffen Records with Neil Jacobson as its president. Three albums under the unit managed to make the number one position on the Billboard 200 throughout the year: Kendrick Lamar's Damn, Lana Del Rey's Lust for Life and U2's Songs of Experience. Ultimately, Lamar's Damn became the number one Billboard 200-year end album of 2017. IGA's number one album streak continued in 2018 with Eminem's Revival and Kamikaze, the soundtrack to the film Black Panther, J. Cole's KOD, and the soundtrack to the 2018 remake of the 1937 film A Star Is Born. However, the only number one Hot 100 single under IGA was Maroon 5's "Girls Like You". It helped parent company Universal Music Group see a 12.6% increase in a $7.1 billion with 31% streaming spikes. Kendrick Lamar helped the prominence of the unit that year with six award wins at the 2018 Billboard Music Awards.

Between 2018 and 2019, A&R Aaron Bay-Schuck (who had been a part of the staff since 2014 following Janick's promotion to CEO) left IGA to join Warner Records. Geffen president Neil Jacobson also left to launch his own label, Crescent Drive.

In 2019, Interscope Geffen A&M sustained another successful milestone with Billie Eilish becoming the first Generation Z and 21st century-born musical artist to have a number one debut album and single in the same period with When We All Fall Asleep, Where Do We Go? and "Bad Guy".

=== 2020–21: COVID impact, recovery, DGC Records merger and Alamo deal fallout ===
In 2020, IGA and UMG saw a 4.5% decrease in music and concert sales, due to the COVID-19 pandemic. UMG CEO Lucian Grainge contracted the disease and had to be quarantined. Then, in the midst of the Black Lives Matter protest of the police-related killing of Breonna Taylor, Interscope artist DaBaby helped to save the unit from financial straits with the "BLM" remix of "Rockstar", making the single reach number one on the Billboard Hot 100. Another number one Hot 100 single would be from Interscope labelmate Lady Gaga; her song, "Rain on Me", debuted atop the chart in June. Her album, Chromatica, also debuted at number one on the Billboard 200. This helped IGA and UMG see a 3.5% increase in music sales by streams during the first half of 2020. Interscope Geffen A&M became the number-one music unit of the year, according to Billboard's year end report with over 68 of its albums charted on the Billboard 200 throughout the year. Joie Manda vacated his position as executive vice president of IGA in December, launching his own label, Encore Recordings, a year later.

By the beginning of the 2020s, IGA recovered again when Geffen artist Olivia Rodrigo scored the unit's first 2021 Hot 100 number one single with "Drivers License", making her another female Generation Z recording artist to have a number one single, alongside Billie Eilish. In May, her debut album, Sour, produced over 295,000 album-equivalent units. It consumed 385 million streams on Spotify, outperforming the first-week streams of fellow UMG artists (labelmates of IGA sister label Republic Records) Ariana Grande and Pop Smoke's albums. This also helped the revived Geffen Records score their first number one album in their catalogue in over fourteen years and made Rodrigo the first female Geffen artist to have a number one album under the label since Mary J. Blige. Billie Eilish eventually scored another number one album under IGA with Happier Than Ever, which released in August, but was commercially overshadowed three months later by her Interscope labelmate Summer Walker, whose album, Still Over It, produced 166,000 equivalent units in its first week, despite also debuting at number one on the Billboard 200. With this amount of success alongside sister label Republic Records, Universal Music reported over 14.4% in revenue increasings by New Year's Eve 2021. Unfortunately, for IGA, another label division merge occurred; after eight years of inactivity, DGC Records was permanently merged into Geffen Records in September, finally ending the label's operations. Because of this, the remains of DGC's artist roster was drafted to Geffen, while some stood under Interscope. Also, Alamo Records, which had been under a distribution deal with IGA since its foundation in 2016, including its artists Blackbear, Wifisfuneral, Lil Durk and Rod Wave, parted ways to sign a new distribution deal with The Orchard, an independent distributor of UMG rival Sony Music, which in June, later acquired a majority stake in Alamo.

=== 2022–24: Billboard commercial dominance and merger with Capitol Music Group ===
In 2022, IGA sustained three number one albums, Mainstream Sellout by Machine Gun Kelly, Mr. Morale & the Big Steppers by Kendrick Lamar and Born Pink by Blackpink. However, several staff member departures increased, including A&R Caroline Diaz, who had been a part of Interscope/Geffen team since 2019; she formed her own label, Great Day Records.

As 2023 commenced, singer Kali Uchis, who had been a part of Interscope since 2017, was drafted to its subsidiary, Geffen, to release her fourth album, Red Moon in Venus, in March of that year. IGA sustained a number one Hot 100 single with Olivia Rodrigo's "Vampire", as well as her album, Guts, which debuted at number one on the Billboard 200 upon release in September.

UMG announced, in February 2024, plans to reorganize its operating units based on geography, with the Los Angeles-based labels combining to form Interscope Capitol Labels Group and Janick becoming its chairman. IGA and Capitol Music Group would continue to maintain their own separate identities, with former Geffen head Tom March taking over as chair of the latter.

== Labels ==
=== Geffen Records ===
- Cinematic Music Group
- Downtown Records
- Hybe Corporation (distribution for the Korean releases in the U.S. only)
  - Big Hit Music (BTS’s Korean releases only)
  - Pledis Entertainment
  - ABD
  - Source Music
  - ADOR
  - KOZ Entertainment
  - Belift Lab
  - HYBE × Geffen (a joint venture between Hybe, Universal Music Group and Geffen Records)
- Rebel Music

=== Interscope Records ===
- Aftermath Entertainment
- Collective Music Group
- Darkroom
- Dreamville Records
- EMI Records
- Interscope Miami
- KIDinaKORNER
- Sosshouse Records
- Shady Records
- Zone 4 Inc

=== Defunct or merged ===
- A&M Records
- A&M Octone Records
- DGC Records
- DreamWorks Records
- Fascination Records
- Flawless Records
- Fiction Records
- Friends Keep Secrets (merged with Mad Love Records into the new A&M Records imprint)
- Kon Live Distribution
- Mad Love Records (merged with Friends Keep Secrets into the new A&M Records imprint)
- MCA Records including catalogs of:
  - ABC Records
  - Chess Records
  - Paramount Records
  - Gasoline Alley Records
  - MCA Nashville (now a part of Universal Music Group Nashville)
  - Radioactive Records
  - Silas Records
  - Uni Records
  - Uptown Records (pre-1996 catalogue; label now under Republic Records)
- Rockland Records
- Star Trak Entertainment
- Tennman Records

=== Former ===
- Blackground Records
- Clover Music
- G-Unit Records (now part of the Virgin Music Group subset of Universal Music Group)
- Matriarch Records
- Mosley Music Group
- Rawkus Records (back catalogue under control of Geffen Records)
- Ruff Ryders Entertainment
- Will.i.am Music Group
- YG Entertainment (Blackpink's Korean releases only)
  - The Black Label (Jeon Somi and Taeyang's Korean releases only)

=== Other ===
- Polydor Records (distribution in the United Kingdom for releases under Interscope and Geffen)
  - A&M Records UK (founded in 2008, as an imprint of Polydor UK)
- Interscope Films (a unit of PolyGram Entertainment)

== See also ==
- List of record labels
- List of current Interscope Records artists
- List of current Geffen Records artists
- List of A&M Records artists
