= Hole in My Heart (Alphabeat song) =

2010 single by Alphabeat

Single by Alphabeat

from the album The Beat Is...
- Released: 21 February 2010
- Genre: Dance-pop; synthpop; house
- Length: 4:08
- Label: Fascination; Polydor
- Songwriter: Anders SG
- Producer: Anders SG

Alphabeat singles chronology
"DJ" (2010)	"Hole in My Heart" (2010)	"Heat Wave" (2010)

"Hole in My Heart" is a song by Danish pop band Alphabeat from The Beat Is... (2010), the international edition of their second studio album, The Spell (2009). It was released on 21 February 2010 as the album's second single in the United Kingdom and third single overall. "Hole in My Heart" peaked at number 29 on the UK Singles Chart, becoming the group's second consecutive UK top-40 hit from The Beat Is...

== Critical reception ==
Alex Fletcher of Digital Spy gave "Hole in My Heart" four out of five stars, stating the song "takes off where 'The Spell' ended with a healthy serving of euphoric piano riffage and synth wooshes. Here the dual vocals of Anders SG and Stine Bramsen twist around the sort of hypnotic beat that will send you back to the big-fish-little-fish warehouse raves of 1991. Although it doesn't pack quite the same instant sugar rush as their debut album's bubblegum pop, 'Hole' is actually a more nourishing, enduring treat. It deserves far better than a nonchalant shrug from music fans—it should be gobbled up."

== Track listings ==
- UK CD single
1. "Hole in My Heart" – 3:30
2. "Hole in My Heart" (Chew Fu Refix) – 2:59
3. "Hole in My Heart" (Wideboys Remix) – 3:17

Tracks on CD are radio edits although not mentioned as such.

- UK 7" picture disc

A. "Hole in My Heart" – 3:30
B. "Hole in My Heart" (Chew Fu Refix) – 2:59

- UK digital single
1. "Hole in My Heart" (Manhattan Clique Remix Edit) – 3:50
- UK digital EP
1. "Hole in My Heart" (Radio Edit) – 3:28
2. "Hole in My Heart" (Chew Fu Refix) [Radio] – 2:57
3. "Hole in My Heart" (Wideboys Remix) [Radio] – 3:15
4. "Hole in My Heart" (The Sound of Arrows Remix) – 4:43

== Charts ==
Chart (2010)	Peak position
UK Singles (OCC)	29

== Release history ==
Region	Date	Format	Label	Ref.
United Kingdom	21 February 2010	Digital download	Fascination; Polydor	
United Kingdom	22 February 2010	CD single; 7" single	Fascination; Polydor	
