= Voyage (The Sound of Arrows album) =

Studio album by The Sound of Arrows
- Released: 7 November 2011
- Recorded: 2008–11; (Stockholm, Sweden); 2011; Miloco Studios (London, England)
- Genre: Synth-pop
- Length: 47:19
- Label: Skies Above
- Producers: The Sound of Arrows, Richard X

Singles from Voyage
- 1. "Into the Clouds" Released: 21 September 2009; 2. "Nova" Released: 25 April 2011; 3. "Magic" Released: 1 August 2011; 4. "Wonders" Released: 19 December 2011

Voyage is the debut studio album by Swedish synth-pop duo The Sound of Arrows, released in the United Kingdom on 7 November 2011. It was preceded by the release of the singles "Nova" on 25 April 2011 and "Magic" on 1 August 2011.

A free remix version of the album was released in 2012.

The album was released as a double 12" vinyl in 2016.

== Critical reception ==
Krystina Nellisi of Drowned in Sound said "In opener 'Into The Clouds' a keyboard organ mode announcing their arrival into The World of Pop, the first line is filled with hope, longing and sheer despair all. Unlike most of its current competitors, for all its studied poise, 'Voyage' has a refreshing complete lack of cynicism.

Dan Martin of the NME awarded the album eight out of ten, described the album as "'Voyage' is just that in the finest of senses, gliding you through its phases in metallic pastel shades from romantic euphoria (‘Magic’), the crush of heartbreak ('Hurting All The Way') through to an epic closer called 'There Is Still Hope'."

The Music Fix gave the album seven points out of ten and said "they get good pinches of understated melancholy and cool European distance." and "The head says there's something rather silly about Sound of Arrows; your heart and feet will say something different. 'There Is Still Hope' they say.

Andy Baber of musicOMH gave the album three and a half stars out of five and said that "The album begins with that 2009 single, Into The Clouds, with its dreamy sentiment of escapism and huge soundscape. The closer, Lost City providing a definitive and poignant conclusion to an album that consistently provokes feelings of wonder, fantasy and nostalgia.

Benjamin Hiorns of Subba Cultcha awarded the album seven out of ten and said "the duo are obviously enamoured by their source material and are true masters of analogue synthesis. Slowly building rhythm and a whirlwind of vintage synths that rattle through the speakers like fireworks. The tones and textures here almost feel alive.

Alasdair Spiv of So So Gay magazine gave the album four out of five and invited you into a 'Voyage' which takes you on a journey you won’t want to come back from. Spilling over with a sense of wide-eyed wonder, the album intentionally captures the spirit of childhood discovery.

Maria Forsström of Metro (Sweden) gave the album three out of five.

Tom Hocknell of Rockfeedback gave the album four out of five and suggested that the title, presumably a nod to 1987's Italo-pop of Desireless' 'Voyage Voyage', will have some running for the Border (line), but those staying are in for a treat.

GLX of The Outhouse gave the album eight out of ten stars and said 'Voyage is' a very cinematic album and reminiscent of 80's children's epics such as The Neverending Story.

Dominic Spez gave the album ten out of ten and made track-by-track review: 'Longest Ever Dream' – there is a Swedish female who adds a very light-hearted, happy vibe to the verses. They really know how to keep a song interesting. They are geniuses. The song basically gets turned on its head and all sounds drop out of the song except for one very dirty and gritty synthesizer... when the other instruments join in, the song has a dark and sad feel, and has now turned into a whole "crying at the disco" affair. 'Hurting All The Way' is like a space-age synth ballad. 'Lost City' – this instrumental provokes feelings of accomplishment and happiness.

Jordan Meehan of EQ Music Blog said 'There is Still Hope' feels as if you are floating in space, drifting magnificently until some big, demanding vocals enter and snap you back into reality. One of the things that make this song so strong is that it effortlessly fuses together big, booming classical music with electronic music, and it makes for an irresistible combination.

Lee Bradshaw of Clixie gave the album nine out of ten and said that the album's experimental electronic pop sound and style commands respect right from the off-set; still maintaining the story-like timeline and structure throughout.

Adrian I of Music-News gave the album five stars out of five, mentioned the similarity with a few other bands and said that this album has been years in the making, but it is well worth exploring if you like any of the acts mentioned during the review.Addict Music gave the album four stars out of five and said "I was introduced to Sound of Arrows three years ago, since then they’ve patiently harvested the hype surrounding them, building a unique universe of synth pop and neon music videos. ... The majestic track 'Ruins of Rome' makes me sad to think that Sounds of Arrows will probably never play giant arena concerts, because this song is made for just that."

Amelia Heathman of Forge Today gave the album eight out of ten and noted the only real criticism that there is with The Sound of Arrows though, is that they walk a fine line between comprehensive electronica and a soundtrack to a light hearted Disney-tween film. In a way they lack the mature sound that other bands in their genre spout. But give them time to develop their sound before even thinking about writing them off as this is a fantastic first offering.

The Digital Fix gave the album seven out of ten and said that this stuff often plays best with good pinches of understated melancholy and cool European distance.

Andrew of Better Than Ya Faves said they created a classic début that made good on all of the previous promise and set themselves up to become trend-setters in the genre.

Andrew Parker of Virgin gave the album five out of ten and mentioned 'Into The Clouds' is nice and catchy – but is likely to annoy the hell out you on repeated listens.

SirDorian of Stylish Kids in Riot gave the album eight and a half out of ten and said The Sound of Arrows have made a mistake in time. 'Voyage' could become a hit in the 80's, but not in the Anno 2011 supersaturation with electro/synth pop.

Crash of Electronic Rumors said 'Voyage' is a manifesto of wonderment, a collection of songs that scream out their hope that the world can be a better place. The album dreams of adult problems seen through the eyes of childhood wonder, stripped down to their basic ridiculousness in a metaphor of magical discovery, culminating in 'There Is Still Hope' while the albums exit, 'Lost City' is an epic cinematic finale.

Bob Bardsley of Popsiculture gave the album 92 out of 100 and noted "you'll probably be well aware that they have a fairly specific sound. Not everybody will like them – I realise that – but those who do, I'd imagine, will probably really really love the combination of typically Swedish vocals and space-age electronic instrumentals."

Professional ratings
Review scores
Source	Rating
Drowned in Sound	(6/10)
NME	(8/10)
The Music Fix	(7/10)
musicOMH	3/5 stars
Subba Cultcha	(7/10)
So So Gay	4/5 stars
Metro (Sweden)	(3/5)
Rockfeedback	4/5 stars
The Outhouse	8/10 stars
Dominic Spez	(10/10)
Clixie	(9/10)
Music-News	5/5 stars
Addict Music	4/5 stars
Forge Today	(8/10)
The Digital Fix	(7/10)
Virgin	(5/10)
Stylish Kids in Riot	(8,5/10)
Popsiculture	(92/100)

== Singles ==
- "Into the Clouds" was released on 21 September 2009.
- "Nova" was released on 25 April 2011.
- "Magic" was released on 1 August 2011.
- "Wonders"/"Conquest" was released as a limited edition 12" on 19 December 2011.
- "Conquest" was released on 25 June 2012.

== Track listing ==
All copies of the album come on 2CDs in a deluxe fold-out slipcase/digipak. The second CD is the whole of the album in instrumental format with a "special ending", namely "Longer Ever Dream", previously available on the Into The Clouds limited edition 12".

No.	Title	Music	Producer(s)	Length
1.	"Into the Clouds"	S. Storm	The Sound of Arrows	3:47
2.	"Wonders"	S. Storm	The Sound of Arrows	4:12
3.	"My Shadow"	S. Storm, H. Branden	The Sound of Arrows, Richard X*, Dan Grech-Marguerat*	4:18
4.	"Magic"	S. Storm	The Sound of Arrows, Richard X, Henrik von Euler	3:16
5.	"Ruins of Rome"	S. Storm	The Sound of Arrows	5:44
6.	"Longest Ever Dream"	S. Storm, Richard X	Richard X, the Sound of Arrows*	4:32
7.	"Hurting All the Way"	S. Storm, J. Pettersson	The Sound of Arrows	2:27
8.	"Conquest"	S. Storm	The Sound of Arrows, Dan Grech-Marguerat*	3:37
9.	"Nova"	S. Storm, J. Cross	The Sound of Arrows	3:53
10.	"There is Still Hope"	S. Storm, M. Dahlstrom	The Sound of Arrows	7:52
11.	"Lost City"	S. Storm, Richard X	Richard X, the Sound of Arrows*	5:16

iTunes Store bonus tracks
No.	Title	Length
12.	"Disappear"	4:17
13.	"Dark Sun"	4:13

* — Additional Production

== Personnel ==
The following people contributed to Voyage:

- The Sound of Arrows – co-producer [Additional Production] (tracks: 1–6, 1–11, 2–6, 2–11), producer (tracks: 1–1 to 1–3, 1–5, 1–7 to 1–10, 2–1 to 2–3, 2–5, 2–7 to 2–10), programming
- Erik Lindestad, Malin Dahlström, Sarah Nyberg Pergament – backing vocals
- Ellen William-Olsson, Fritiof Fagergren, Livia Plarsmo, Lova Hammarström, Max Falk – children's choir
- Richard X – co-producer [Additional Production] (tracks: 1–1, 1–3, 2–1, 2–3), producer (tracks: 1–1, 1–3, 1–4, 2–1, 2–3, 2–4), music (tracks: 1–6, 2–6)
- Oskar Gullstrand – design
- Nigel Walton – mastering
- Dan Grech-Marguerat – mixing, producer (tracks: 1–3, 1–8, 2–3, 2–8)
- Henrik von Euler – producer (tracks: 1–4, 2–4)
- Hanna Brandén* – music (tracks: 1–3, 2–3)
- Joseph Cross* – music (tracks: 1–9, 2–9)
- Jonas Petterson* – music (tracks: 1–7, 2–7)
- Malin Dahlström – music (tracks: 1–10, 2–10)
- Stefan Storm* – music
- Pete Hofmann – engineer at Miloco Studios throughout 2011

Phonographic Copyright (p) – The Sound of Arrows
Licensed From – Conquest Music Ltd.
Copyright (c) – The Sound of Arrows
Phonographic Copyright (p) – Skies Above
Copyright (c) – Skies Above

== Release history ==
Region	Date	Label	Format
Scandinavia	7 November 2011	Skies Above	CD, digital download
United Kingdom	7 November 2011	Skies Above	CD, digital download
Spain	7 November 2011	Skies Above	CD, digital download
Germany	7 November 2011	Skies Above	CD, digital download
