= Danger! (EP) =

EP by The Sound of Arrows
- Released: May 7, 2008
- Genre: Electronic, synthpop
- Language: English
- Label: Labrador

The Sound of Arrows chronology
Danger! (2008)	M.A.G.I.C. (2009)

Danger! is the first EP by Swedish duo The Sound of Arrows. Danger! was available for free digital download from the site of the record company.

The Sound of Arrows are starting out totally unknown so they’ve only brought in friends this time. Cotton Crew, Panache and Mr Pedro go for the electro-pumping sound. The version by Ice Cream Shout instead takes the route of super-mega twee. Complete with ukuleles and toypianos.

== Track listings ==
All tracks are written by The Sound of Arrows.

CD
No.	Title	Length
1.	"Intro"	1:22
2.	"Danger!"	4:24
3.	"A Very Sad Song"	4:24
4.	"Winding Roads"	2:46
5.	"Danger! (Mr Pedro Remix)"	4:40
6.	"Danger! (Cotton Crew Remix)"	5:48
7.	"Danger! (Panache Remix)"	9:19
8.	"Danger! (Ice Cream Shout Version)"	4:36
9.	"Outro"	2:26

== Personnel ==
- The Sound of Arrows — production, design and layout of artwork
- One Size Fits All — logo of artwork
- Linus Kullman — painting of artwork
- Björn Baummann — bass (tracks: 2)
