= Wonders (song) =

Single by The Sound of Arrows

from the album Voyage
- A-side: "Conquest"
- B-side: "Longest Ever Daydream"; "The Last Goodbye"
- Released: 19 December 2011
- Genre: Electronic, synthpop
- Label: Major Label, Neon Gold
- Songwriter: Stefan Storm
- Producer: The Sound of Arrows

The Sound of Arrows singles chronology
"Magic" (2011)	"Wonders" (2011)

"Wonders" is a single by Swedish duo The Sound of Arrows from their debut album Voyage. AA-side 12" contains two cuts from the album, "Wonders" and Conquest". All pulsing, skyscraping synths and bittersweet vocals, "Wonders" simmers in a magic cauldron of nostalgia, as Stefan Storm's heart-piercing refrain lights up the mic and stardust showers from the ceiling like confetti. Then it's time for "Conquest" to shine, turning in the performance of a lifetime in the record's best supporting single role. Coming off like Royksopp on a sugar high, "Conquest" churns along as red velvet synths course through your veins and the duo rally around a triumphant chorus for the ages on what might just be our favorite track of theirs yet. Together, they'll make you feel like the last child emperor in the galaxy, like anything is possible, and it's a wonderful sense of omnipotence.

== Music video ==
The band premiered their music video on Facebook on November 8, 2011. This video is combining retro home videos, Stefan Storm in his bedroom, and flashes of various natural wonderment, the new video matches the epic feel of the song. Add in a laser light show, spaceships, and some planets, and you can’t help but understand the meaning of the word wonder.

- Artist: The Sound of Arrows
- Title: Wonders
- Director: The Sound of Arrows, Mattias Erik Johansson
- DoP: Daniel Takács

== Track listing ==
- 12" Vinyl

Side A

1. "Wonders"
2. "Conquest"

Side B

1. "Longest Ever Daydream"
2. "The Last Goodbye"

Remixes

1. "Wonders (The Knocks Remix)"
2. "Wonders (VISITOR Remix)"
3. "Wonders (Deep Space Lost In Orbit Remix)"
- CD
1. "Wonders"
2. "Conquest"
3. "Longest Ever Daydream"
4. "The Last Goodbye"

== Personnel ==
- The Sound of Arrows—lyrics, music, production
