= Chungking (band) =

English synthpop group

- Origin: Brighton, England, UK
- Genres: Electropop, downtempo, synthpop, dance-pop
- Years active: 2003–present
- Labels: Institute Recordings
- Members: Jessie Banks (Vocals); Sean Hennessey; Ben Townsend
- Past members: James Stephenson
- Website: http://www.chungkingmusic.co.uk/ (Defunct address of Official Site); Official MySpace

Chungking are a British synthpop group formed in Brighton.

== Overview ==
Chungking was set in motion by the basement-based musical tinkerings of Sean Hennessey and his friend James Stephenson. The pair eventually decided to obtain a vocalist and discovered that Hennessey's then-girlfriend, Jessie Banks, could sing. Together they spent some time writing music and demoing songs, some of which made their way to Japan where a Tokyo DJ cut part of the demo CD onto 12" records. One of these records landed in the hands of the owner of Tummy Touch Records with the Japanese label reading "beautiful Chungking music" (From where the band eventually got its name). The owner tracked the band down and persuaded them to finish their album. Their first album We Travel Fast was released under Tummy Touch Records in 2003.

Chungking then released the album "The hungry years" in 2004 which was a modified version of "We Travel Fast" In 2007 the album "Stay Up Forever" was released by Gut Records.

Chungking then took some time out from making records and wrote primarily for T.V. and advertising. Songs were featured on programmes such as Nip/Tuck, Grey's Anatomy and Ugly Betty.

Chungking decided in 2012 that it was time to get back to the magic of the studio and create a new album. "Defender" has been recorded and is anticipated for release in 2015.

The line up of Chungking is now Jessie Banks, Sean Hennessy and Ben Townsend.

In December 2014, Chungking's new song 'Sapphire' was released ahead of the full album release in June 2015.

== Discography ==
=== Albums ===
- We Travel Fast (2003)
- The Hungry Years (2004)
- Stay Up Forever (2007)
- Defender (2015)

=== Singles ===
- "Making Music" (2003)
- "Voodoo" (2005)
- "Love Is Here To Stay" (2007)
- "Stay Up Forever" (2007)
- "Sapphire" (2014)
