= Express Non-Stop =

Studio album by Alphabeat
- Released: 24 September 2012
- Length: 36:30
- Label: Copenhagen
- Producer: Alphabeat

Alphabeat chronology
The Spell (2009)	Express Non-Stop (2012)	Don't Know What's Cool Anymore (2019)

Singles from Express Non-Stop
- 1. "Vacation" Released: 12 March 2012; 2. "Love Sea" Released: 13 August 2012; 3. "X-Mas (Let's Do It Again)" Released: 23 November 2012; 4. "Show Me What Love Is" Released: 18 February 2013

Express Non-Stop is the third studio album by Danish band Alphabeat. It was released on 24 September 2012 by Copenhagen Records. Unlike their two previous albums This is Alphabeat and The Spell, it was released solely in their native Denmark. Express Non-Stop reached number three on the Danish charts. The first two singles from the album, "Vacation" and "Love Sea", were certified gold in Denmark.

== Track listing ==
All tracks written and produced by Alphabeat.

No.	Title	Length
1.	"The Beat Don't Stop"	2:43
2.	"Love Sea"	3:55
3.	"Since I Met You"	3:15
4.	"Younger than Yesterday"	3:14
5.	"Mad About You"	3:47
6.	"Express Non-Stop"	5:53
7.	"Vacation"	2:55
8.	"Brand New Day"	3:21
9.	"Show Me What Love Is"	3:30
10.	"Love on the Line"	3:57

Digital X-Mas Edition bonus track
No.	Title	Length
11.	"X-Mas (Let's Do It Again)"	3:40

== Personnel ==
Credits adapted from the liner notes of Express Non-Stop.

Alphabeat

- Alphabeat – production, recording
- Anders Bønløkke – guitar
- Stine Bramsen – vocals
- Troels Møller – drums
- Rasmus Nagel – keyboards
- Anders Reinholdt – bass
- Anders SG – vocals

Additional personnel

- Thomas Brando – artwork
- Jan Eliasson – mastering
- Rasmus Weng Karlsen – photography
- Mads Nilsson – mixing
- Torben Ravn – product management

== Charts ==
Chart (2012)	Peak position
Danish Albums (Hitlisten)	3
