= Go-Go (Alphabeat song) =

Single by Alphabeat

from the album This Is Alphabeat
- A-side: "Go-Go"
- Released: April 21, 2008 (Denmark)
- Recorded: 2007
- Genre: Dance-pop
- Length: 3:05
- Label: Copenhagen Records
- Songwriter(s): Anders Bonlokke
- Producer(s): Mike Spencer

Alphabeat singles chronology
| "Boyfriend" (2007) | "Go-Go" (2008) | "What Is Happening" (2008) |

"Go-Go" was the fourth single released by Alphabeat. It was introduced on the international edition of their first album, but was not released as a single outside of Denmark.

It features backing vocals by girl band The Real Heat.

== Charts ==
"Go-Go" charted in Denmark at number 14.

| Chart (2007) | Peak position |
|---|---|
| Denmark (Tracklisten) | 14 |
