= The Spell (Alphabeat album) =

Studio album by Alphabeat
- Released: 26 October 2009
- Genre: Dance-pop; Europop; house; synth-pop
- Length: 37:22
- Label: Copenhagen
- Producer: Anders B; Troels Hansen; Rasmus Nagel; Jonas Quant; Anders SG; Mike Spencer; Richard "Biff" Stannard

Alphabeat chronology
Alphabeat (2007)	The Spell (2009)	Express Non-Stop (2012)

Singles from The Spell
- 1. "The Spell" Released: 21 September 2009; 2. "DJ" Released: 9 January 2010; 3. "Hole in My Heart" Released: 21 February 2010; 4. "Heat Wave" Released: 21 June 2010

The Spell is the second studio album by Danish band Alphabeat. It was released on 26 October 2009 by Copenhagen Records. Alphabeat stated their second album would be a departure from the pop roots of their debut studio album, Alphabeat (2007), in favour of dance acts from the 1990s such as Snap! and Black Box, with band member Anders SG saying the title track was particularly inspired by Black Box's 1990 song "I Don't Know Anybody Else".

The album was originally set to be released in the United Kingdom one week after the original Danish release, but was eventually released on 1 March 2010, followed by the second single, "Hole in My Heart". For its international release, the album was retitled The Beat Is... and includes the bonus track "Till I Get Round".

In November 2010, the album earned Alphabeat the Danish Music Award for Danish Group of the Year.

== Singles ==
"The Spell" was released in Denmark on 21 September 2009, serving as the lead single from the album. It topped the Danish Singles Chart for four non-consecutive weeks, while reaching number six in Belgium, number 11 in the Netherlands and number 20 in the United Kingdom.

"Hole in My Heart" was released on 21 February 2010 as the album's second UK single and third single overall, peaking at 29 on the UK Singles Chart.

"DJ", released on 9 January 2010 as the album's second single in Denmark, peaked at number six on the Danish chart. When released as the third UK single on 31 May 2010, the track was remixed by Biffco and issued as "DJ (I Could Be Dancing)", but failed to chart within the UK top 100, instead reaching number 116.

"Heat Wave" was released in Denmark on 21 June 2010 as the album's fourth and final single overall. It charted at number four in Denmark, the group's second highest-peaking single in their home country.

== Critical reception ==
Professional ratings
Aggregate scores
Source	Rating
Metacritic	58/100
Review scores
Source	Rating
AllMusic	4/5 stars
Daily Express	3/5
Drowned in Sound	1/10
entertainment.ie	2.5/5 stars
The Guardian	3/5 stars
musicOMH	2.5/5 stars
NME	5/10
The Times	3/5 stars

The Beat Is... received mixed reviews from music critics. At Metacritic, which assigns a normalised rating out of 100 to reviews from mainstream publications, the album received an average score of 58, based on seven reviews. K. Ross Hoffman of AllMusic viewed the album as "an even glossier, more unabashedly poptastic affair than their first album", adding that it "takes its cues from turn of the '90s club music: Hi-NRG, Euro-beat, hip-house, and the Scandinavian synth-reggae of Ace of Base." Hugh Montgomery wrote for The Observer that the album finds the group "appropriating the handbag house sound that was the cornerstone of provincial clubs circa 1995. Thus jittery piano riffs and hands-in-the-air breakdowns abound, while singer Stine hollers dancefloor doggerel." Simon Gage of the Daily Express described the songs as "chirpy and silly with witty lyrics", while calling the music itself "Euro-nonsense at its finest". Stephen Kelly of NME commented that Alphabeat "have bravely stripped away all the bubblegum that originally made them popular in favour of the Euro-dance years of the late-'80s/early-'90s. The result is stronger than you might think, but too inconsistent and devoid of depth to stand out on a battlefield where Gaga rules all."

The Times critic Peter Paphides opined that the album "varies the tempo and tone without sacrificing the joyful execution. The ultra-catchy single, 'The Spell', is an apt microcosm of a whole that peaks with the Italo-house urgency of '365 Degrees'. But, if 'Chess'' resemblance to Ace of Base strikes you as a bad thing, the rest may not appeal to you either." Michael Cragg of musicOMH noted that "[t]hings start promisingly, [...] with the first four songs zipping by in a blaze of joyfully cheesy beats [...], '90s rave piano [...] and neat vocal interplay between singers Anders SG and Stine Bramsen", but felt that the remainder of the album "lacks any sparkle or panache, with the band falling foul of a very current musical disease; the Auto-Tune obsession." Lauren Murphy of entertainment.ie concluded that the group "may have lost some of their magic, but they admittedly make reparations with the damned catchy 'Heat Wave' and 'The Right Thing', two of the peppiest tunes on offer here. Unfortunately, it's not quite enough to prevent this album from being something of an anticlimax. A highly stylised one, sure—but a disappointment, nonetheless." The Guardian's Michael Hann expressed, "The glee that infused that first album has been swamped by endless staccato synth or piano riffs, all of which sound like a score of minor hits from a generation ago." Aaron Lavery of Drowned in Sound panned the album as "an absolute abomination of a record" and stated, "Gone is any sense of personality or charm that Alphabeat once had, to be replaced by masses of Autotuned vocals, processed beats and batteries of keyboard sounds that haven't been aired since Ace of Base and 2Unlimited ruled the waves."

== Track listing ==
The Spell – Danish edition
No.	Title	Writer(s)	Producer(s)	Length
1.	"The Spell"	Anders SG; Anders B	SG; B	3:37
2.	"DJ"	B	B	3:28
3.	"Hole in My Heart"	SG	SG	4:08
4.	"The Beat Is"	Troels Hansen; Rasmus Nagel	Hansen; Nagel	3:21
5.	"Heatwave"	B; Mike Spencer	B; Spencer	3:47
6.	"Chess"	SG; B; Stine Bramsen; Jonas Quant; Richard "Biff" Stannard	Quant; Stannard	3:33
7.	"Heart Failure"	B	B	3:33
8.	"Always Up with You"	SG	SG	3:38
9.	"Q&A"	SG; B; Bramsen; Steve Robson	SG; B	4:06
10.	"The Right Thing"	SG; B	SG; B	4:11
Total length:				37:22

iTunes Store bonus tracks
No.	Title	Writer(s)	Length
11.	"The Spell" (Buzz Junkies Remix)	SG; B	3:27
12.	"The Spell" (Digital Dog Remix)	SG; B	2:49

The Beat Is... – International edition
No.	Title	Writer(s)	Producer(s)	Length
1.	"The Beat Is"	Hansen; Nagel	Hansen; Nagel	3:21
2.	"The Spell"	SG; B	SG; B	3:37
3.	"DJ"	B	B	3:28
4.	"Hole in My Heart"	SG	SG	4:08
5.	"Chess"	SG; B; Bramsen; Quant; Stannard	Quant; Stannard	3:33
6.	"Heart Failure"	B	B	3:33
7.	"Heat Wave"	B; Spencer	B; Spencer	3:47
8.	"Always Up with You"	SG	SG	3:38
9.	"Q & A"	SG; B; Bramsen; Robson	SG; B	4:06
10.	"The Right Thing"	SG; B	SG; B	4:11
11.	"Till I Get Round"	B	B	3:27
Total length:				40:49

iTunes Store bonus tracks
No.	Title	Length
12.	"365 Degrees"	3:10
13.	"The Spell" (music video)	3:44
14.	"Hole in My Heart" (music video)	3:36

Amazon.co.uk pre-order bonus track
No.	Title	Writer(s)	Length
12.	"Telephone"/"Bad Romance"	Lady Gaga; Rodney Jerkins; LaShawn Daniels; Lazonate Franklin; Beyoncé; RedOne	4:25

Play.com pre-order bonus track
No.	Title	Writer(s)	Length
12.	"Ain't Nobody"	Hawk Wolinski	3:06

== Personnel ==
Credits adapted from the liner notes of The Beat Is...

Alphabeat

- Anders B – production (all except "The Beat Is...", "Hole in My Heart", "Chess" and "Always Up with You")
- Troels Hansen – production ("The Beat Is...")
- Rasmus Nagel – production ("The Beat Is...")
- Anders SG – production ("The Spell", "Hole in My Heart", "Always Up with You", "Q & A", "The Right Thing")

Additional personnel

- Miles Aldridge – photography
- Chris Gehringer – mastering
- Serban Ghenea – mixing
- Mr & Mrs Smith – logo design
- Hannah Neaves – product management
- Liz Pagett – management
- Jonas Quant – keyboards, production, programming ("Chess")
- Torben Ravn – product management
- Salvador Design – layout design
- Jakob Sørensen – product management
- Mike Spencer – production ("Heat Wave")
- Richard "Biff" Stannard – keyboards, production, programming ("Chess")

== Charts ==
=== Weekly charts ===
Chart (2010)	Peak position
Danish Albums (Hitlisten)	5
Dutch Albums (Album Top 100)	96
Scottish Albums (OCC)	37
UK Albums (OCC)	39

=== Year-end charts ===
Chart (2009)	Position
Danish Albums (Hitlisten)	36

Chart (2010)	Position
Danish Albums (Hitlisten)	22

== Certifications ==
Region	Certification	Certified units/sales
Denmark (IFPI Danmark)	Platinum	30,000^{^}
^{^} Shipments figures based on certification alone.

== Release history ==
Region	Date	Label	Edition	Ref.
Denmark	26 October 2009	Copenhagen	The Spell	
United Kingdom	1 March 2010	Fascination; Polydor	The Beat Is...	
Germany	2 March 2010	Universal	The Beat Is...	
Netherlands	12 March 2010	Universal	The Beat Is...	
