= Heat Wave (Alphabeat song) =

Alphabeat single

Single by Alphabeat

from the album The Spell
- Released: 21 June 2010
- Recorded: 2009–10
- Genre: Dance-pop; Eurodance; house
- Length: 3:24
- Label: Copenhagen
- Songwriter(s): Anders B; Mike Spencer
- Producer(s): Anders B; Mike Spencer

Alphabeat singles chronology
"Hole in My Heart" (2010)	"Heat Wave" (2010)	"Vacation" (2012)

"Heat Wave" is a song by Danish pop band Alphabeat from their second studio album, The Spell (2009). The song was released in Denmark on 21 June 2010 as the album's fourth and final single. "Heat Wave" peaked at number four on the Danish Singles Chart, and was certified gold by IFPI Denmark in October 2010, denoting sales in excess of 15,000 copies.

== Track listing ==
- Digital download
1. "Heat Wave" – 3:24

== Charts ==
=== Weekly charts ===
Chart (2010)	Peak position
Denmark (Tracklisten)	4

=== Year-end charts ===
Chart (2010)	Position
Denmark (Tracklisten)	43
