= Magic (The Sound of Arrows song) =

Single by The Sound of Arrows
- Released: 1 August 2011
- Genre: Electronic, synthpop
- Label: Major Label, Geffen
- Songwriter(s): Stefan Storm
- Producer(s): The Sound of Arrows

The Sound of Arrows singles chronology
"Nova" (2011)	"Magic" (2011)	"Wonders" (2011)

"Magic" is a song by Swedish duo The Sound of Arrows from their debut album Voyage.

== Music video ==
In the video all adults disappeared and children live in their magic world.

Shot in Spain, in countryside two hours from Madrid, Oskar Gullstrand explains that it is meant to be "childlike and youthful, and true to the song. When we were thinking about the video, Stefan and I first came up for about 200 ideas for a feature film. This is meant to be the trailer for that film."

- Artist: The Sound of Arrows
- Title: Magic (Geffen)
- Director: Andreas Ohman, Oskar Gullstrand
- Production Company: Naive AB, The Look Films
- Producer: Victor Martin
- DoP: Johan Holmquist
- Art Director: Gerardo Izquierdo
- Editor: Frederika Andersson, Andreas Ohman, Oskar Gullstrand
- Illustrator: Linus Kullman, Carl-Johan Listherby
- Animator: Jonas Lindman
- Compositing: David Nalci

== Track listings ==
CD, UK

1. «Magic» – 3:17
2. «Magic» (Instrumental) – 3:15

vinyl 12", UK

Side A

1. «Magic»
2. «Magic» (Tom Staar Remix)
3. «Magic» (Chad Valley Remix)

Side B

1. «Longer Ever Dream»

== Personnel ==
- Mastered by – Nigel Walton
- Mixed by – Dan Grech-Marguerat
- Producer – The Sound of Arrows
- Producer [Additional] – Henrik Von Euler, Richard X
- Written-By – S. Storm*
