= Vacation (novel) =

2007 novel by Jeremy C. Shipp

- First edition cover art
- Author: Jeremy C. Shipp
- Cover artist: M. Garrow Bourke
- Language: English
- Genre: Science fiction, Horror, Bizarro, Postmodernist novel
- Published: 2007 (Raw Dog Screaming Press)
- Publication place: United States
- Media type: Print (hardback)
- Pages: 159 pp (first edition, hardback)
- ISBN: 978-1-933293-40-0 (first edition, hardback)
- OCLC: 154677071

Vacation (2007) is the first and most recent novel by American author Jeremy C. Shipp. Vacation’s protagonist, Bernard Johnson, finds himself trapped in a job his parents chose for him, miserable in a loveless relationship, and dependent on anti-depressants for his emotional stability. When he takes his Vacation, a year-long federally funded trip around the world provided to every American, he is kidnapped by terrorists but does not miss his average life or the expectations placed on him by society.
