= Permanent Vacation =

Permanent Vacation may refer to:

- A slang term for a layoff

== Film and television ==
- Permanent Vacation (1980 film), written and directed by Jim Jarmusch
- Permanent Vacation (2007 film), a dark comedy by W. Scott Peake
- "Permanent Vacation" (CSI: Miami episode), an episode of CSI: Miami

== Music ==
- Permanent Vacation (Aerosmith album), 1987
  - Permanent Vacation 3x5, a 1988 Aerosmith video
  - Permanent Vacation Tour, a 1987–1988 Aerosmith concert tour
- Permanent Vacation (Lime Cordiale album), 2017

=== Songs ===
- "Permanent Vacation", by 5 Seconds of Summer from the 2015 album Sounds Good Feels Good
- "Permanent Vacation", by R.E.M. on the 2004 album iTunes Originals – R.E.M.
- "Permanent Vacation", by The Academic from the 2018 album Tales From The Backseat
