= List of Geffen Records artists =

This is a list of artists who have recorded for Geffen Records, later under Interscope Records.

== 0–9 ==
- 10,000 Maniacs
- 3
- The 7A3
- 60ft Dolls (US)

== A ==
- A3 (US)
- Adam Bomb
- Aldn
- Aerosmith
- Agnes
- Alberta Cross (Black Lodge/Fiction/Polydor/Geffen)
- Alien Ant Farm
- AlunaGeorge
- Angels & Airwaves (Suretone/Geffen)
- Aqua (US)
- Asia
- Australian Crawl
- Ava Denera (American King Music/Geffen)
- Avant
- Ado (Japanese Pop/Geffen)

== B ==
- B00TY
- Alex Band
- Jimmy Barnes (US)
- Beck (DGC/Geffen)
- Lauren Bennett
- Berlin (US/Canada)
- Bivouac (DGC/Geffen)
- Black Heff (American King Music/Geffen)
- Black 'N Blue
- Blaque
- Mary J. Blige
- Blink-182
- Bloodhound Gang
- Bone Thugs-n-Harmony
- Børns
- Boss Hog (DGC/Geffen)
- BoyNextDoor (Hybe – KOZ/Geffen)
- Braden Bales
- Brick & Lace
- Toni Braxton
- BTS (Hybe – Big Hit/Geffen/Interscope)
- Buckcherry
- Busta Rhymes
- Edie Brickell & New Bohemians

== C ==
- The Candyskins
- Calvin Jeremy (Geffen/Universal Malaysia)
- Camila Cabello (Geffen/Interscope)
- Irene Cara
- Belinda Carlisle
- Carly Rae Jepsen (Geffen Malaysia)
- Eric Carmen
- Peter Case
- Catfish
- Greyson Chance (Geffen/Maverick/eleveneleven)
- Cher
- The Chameleons
- Charlotte Sometimes
- Chauncey Black (Flipmode/Aftermath/Geffen)
- Chevy Woods (Taylor Gang/Geffen)
- Bryn Christopher
- Cinder
- Class The King (American King Music/Geffen)
- Clubland
- Coconut Records
- Keyshia Cole
- Pat Metheny/Ornette Coleman
- Cold
- Lloyd Cole and the Commotions (US)
- Judy Collins
- Common (G.O.O.D. Music/Geffen)
- Bill Cosby
- Counting Crows (DGC/Geffen)
- Cowboy Junkies
- Nadine Coyle
- The Creatures (US)
- The Crystal Method
- The Cure

== D ==
- Days of the New (Outposext/Geffen)
- Death Angel
- Alon De Loco
- Depswa
- Jason Derulo (American King Music/Geffen)
- Deuce
- Diamond Head
- DJ Shadow
- DJ Snake
- Christine Dolce
- Geoffrey Downes
- Driveblind
- Drop Dead, Gorgeous (Suretone/Geffen)

== E ==
- The Eagles
- Eastern Conference Champions
- Elastica (DGC/Geffen)
- Eleanor McEvoy
- Enhypen (Hybe – Belift Lab/Geffen)
- Enya (US)
- Esquire
- Everything Everything
- Ezo

== F ==
- Fan 3
- Field Mob (Disturbing tha Peace/Geffen)
- Finch
- Floetry
- Steve Forbert
- Nelly Furtado (Mosley Music/Geffen)
- FOS (Fortress of Solitude)

== G ==
- Peter Gabriel (US/Canada)
- Galactic Cowboys
- Game (BWS/Geffen)
- Garbage (Almo Sounds/Geffen)
- Gene Loves Jezebel (US)
- Girlicious
- God Street Wine
- Whoopi Goldberg
- Selena Gomez (Geffen Malaysia)
- Macy Gray (will.i.am Music Group/Geffen)
- Grim Reaper
- Gryffin
- Guns N' Roses
- Genius/GZA
- Adrian Gurvitz

== H ==
- H2O (American band)
- Sammy Hagar
- Hagar Schon Aaronson Shrieve
- Half Way Home
- Kimberly Hall (American King Music/Geffen)
- James Hall (DGC/Geffen)
- Trevor Hall
- Deborah Harry
- Imogen Heap (Almo Sounds/Geffen)
- Hedley (Universal/Geffen)
- Don Henley
- John Hiatt
- Hoku
- Hole (DGC/Geffen)
- Jennifer Holliday
- Hotboii (Rebel)
- Debra Hurd
- Hush

== I ==
- Maarja-Liis Ilus
- Il Volo
- Ish Ledesma
- It Bites (US)
- iayze
- Illit (Hybe – Belift Lab/Geffen)

== J ==
- J.I (G*Starr Ent./Geffen/Interscope)
- Jackyl
- Jade Ewen
- J-Hope (Hybe – Big Hit/Geffen)
- Jibbs
- Jimin (Hybe – Big Hit/Geffen)
- Jin (Hybe – Big Hit/Geffen)
- Jimmy Page
- Joanna
- Daron Jones
- Elton John (US/Canada)
- Malese Jow
- Jungkook (Hybe – Big Hit/Geffen)
- Junkyard

== K ==
- Kamaiyah
- Kardinal Offishall
- Katseye (Hybe – Hybe × Geffen (Hybe UMG/Geffen))
- Ken Laszlo
- Tommy Keene
- Kelis
- Tori Kelly
- Killah Priest
- B.B. King
- Kitarō
- Solange Knowles (Music World Entertainment/Geffen)
- Fela Kuti

== L ==
- Large Professor
- Lawson (Geffen Malaysia)
- Lee Ryan
- John Lennon
- Le Sserafim (Hybe – Source Music/Geffen)
- Lifehouse
- The Like
- Limp Bizkit
- Little Caesar (DGC/Geffen)
- Lisa Loeb
- Lone Justice
- Lo-Pro
- Inger Lorre
- Loud Lucy (DGC/Geffen)

== M ==
- Machine Gun Kelly
- Madness (US)
- Aimee Mann (DGC/Geffen)
- Lyle Mays
- Mac McAnally
- Maria McKee
- Manowar
- Pat Metheny Group
- Midwxst
- Mini Viva
- Mims (American King Music/Geffen)
- Nicki Minaj
- Kylie Minogue (US)
- Joni Mitchell
- Missez
- The Misfits
- Mixi
- Models
- Mommyheads
- Motier Arina (Def Jam Recordings) (deceased)
- Thurston Moore (DGC/Geffen)
- Mos Def
- Mummy Calls
- Walter Murphy and His Orchestra
- My Little Funhouse
- Gary Myrick

== N ==
- Leona Naess
- Kate Nash (US)
- Nelson (DGC/Geffen)
- New Edition
- New Found Glory
- NewJeans (Hybe – ADOR/Geffen)
- New Radicals
- Olivia Newton-John (US/Canada)
- Nitzer Ebb (US)
- NLT
- Noa
- Non Phixion
- Nonpoint
- Terri Nunn
- The Nymphs

== O ==
- Ric Ocasek
- Yoko Ono
- Orianthi
- Emily Osment
- Ours
- Oxo
- Ozzico
- Olivia Rodrigo

== P ==
- Nerina Pallot
- Papa Roach
- Pariah
- Ray Parker Jr.
- Janel Parrish
- Pell Mell (DGC/Geffen)
- Phantom Blue
- Phantom Planet
- The Pink Spiders (Suretone/Geffen)
- Pitchshifter
- Planet P Project
- The Plimsouls
- Poppy (Island/Geffen)
- The Posies (DGC/Geffen)
- Prima J
- Prince Ty (American King Music/Geffen)
- Project Pat (Taylor Gang/Geffen)
- Puddle of Mudd (Flawless/Geffen)

== Q ==
- Quarterflash

== R ==
- The Raincoats (DGC/Geffen)
- Raw Stylus
- Chris Rea (US)
- Remy Zero
- The Revolution Smile
- Ringside
- Rise Against
- Joan Rivers
- RM (Hybe – Big Hit/Geffen)
- Tom Robinson
- Rock City Angels
- Olivia Rodrigo (Geffen/Interscope)
- The Rolling Stones (Polydor/Geffen) (US/Canada)
- Rooney (Cherrytree/Geffen)
- Emmy Rossum
- Mike Ruekberg
- Lee Ryan

== S ==
- Saigon Kick (Uzi Suicide/Geffen)
- Saint Satine (Hybe – Hybe × Geffen (Hybe UMG/Geffen))
- Samsung Galaxy (RCA Records)
- Saliva
- Salty Dog (Geffen)
- Jessica Sanchez (Polydor/Geffen UK)
- The Saturdays
- Scorcher
- Screwly G (Grade A/Geffen)
- Semi Precious Weapons (Cherry Tree/Razor & Tie)
- Seventeen (Hybe – Pledis/Geffen)
- Shawnna (Nappy Boy/Geffen)
- She Wants Revenge
- Shooting Star
- Shwayze (Suretone/Geffen)
- Sigur Rós (US)
- Simon and Garfunkel (Outside of USA & Canada)
- Ashlee Simpson
- Siouxsie and the Banshees (US/Canada)
- Slash
- Sloan
- Slumber Party Girls
- Snoop Dogg
- Skilla Baby
- Snot
- Snow Patrol (US)
- Something Corporate
- Sonic Youth (DGC/Geffen)
- Sound the Alarm
- Southern Culture on the Skids (DGC/Geffen)
- Spensha Baker
- Spotem Gottem (Rebel)
- St. Johnny (DGC/Geffen)
- The Starting Line
- STAYC (High Up/Geffen/Interscope)
- The Stone Roses (US)
- The Style Council (US)
- Sublime (Gasoline Alley/Geffen)
- The Sugarplastic (DGC/Geffen)
- Donna Summer
- The Sundays (DGC/Geffen)
- Sweet 75 (DGC/Geffen)
- S.T.U.N.
- The Sylvers

== T ==
- Teenage Fanclub (DGC/Geffen)
- Tesla
- that dog. (DGC/Geffen)
- The Brothers Figaro
- The Sound of Arrows
- Ashley Tisdale
- Tokyo's Revenge
- Trust Company
- The Band (American/Republic/The Body Of Woman/Geffen)
- Twenty Twenty
- Tuide (Hybe – ABD/Geffen)
- TWS (Hybe – Pledis/Geffen)
- Tyketto

== U ==
- Kali Uchis

== V ==
- V (Hybe – Big Hit/Geffen)
- Vagabond
- Vanity
- Van Zant (eponymous album, 1985)
- Veruca Salt (DGC/Geffen)
- Vitamin Z (US)
- Il Volo

== W ==
- Rufus Wainwright
- Wang Chung
- The Wanted
- Warrant
- Warrior Soul
- Was (Not Was)
- The Waterboys
- We've Got a Fuzzbox and We're Gonna Use It
- Weezer (DGC/Geffen)
- Gillian Welch (Almo Sounds/Geffen)
- John Wetton
- Whiskeytown
- Matt White
- White Lies
- Whitesnake (US & Canada)
- White Zombie
- Wild Colonials (DGC/Geffen)
- Wishbone Ash
- Nicole Wray
- Zakk Wylde

== X ==
- X Ambassadors
- XTC (US)

== Y ==
- Neil Young
- Y&T
- Yeat

== Z ==
- Van Zant
- Remy Zero (DGC/Geffen)
- Rob Zombie
- Zico (Hybe – KOZ/Geffen)

== See also ==
- Geffen Records
