= Shadows (Alphabeat song) =

Single by Alphabeat

from the album Don't Know What's Cool Anymore
- Released: 1 March 2019
- Length: 2:46
- Label: Warner Music Denmark
- Songwriters: Anders Bønløkke; Anders Stig Gehrt-Bendixen
- Producers: Anders Bønløkke; Anders Stig Gehrt-Bendixen; Emil Sebastian Albæk-Falk

Alphabeat singles chronology
| "Show Me What Love Is" (2013) | "Shadows" (2019) | "I Don't Know What's Cool Anymore" (2019) |

"Shadows" is a song by Danish pop group Alphabeat. It was released on 1 March 2019 by Warner Music Denmark as the lead single from their fourth studio album Don't Know What's Cool Anymore. The song peaked at number nineteen on the Danish Singles Chart.

== Background ==
In an interview with Billboard, Anders SG said: "When our manager heard us demo the song through the wall to his office, he came into the studio and was like, 'What is this? It's great!' This does happen sometimes, but not on a regular basis, so we thought, maybe we're onto something. For some reason the song reminded us a little bit of some of the more melancholy Motown hits like 'Standing In The Shadows Of Love', so we wanted to have a kind of upbeat soul groove together with the pop hooks. 'Shadows' has a kind of signature drumbeat, which we like to think has become a bit of an Alphabeat trademark." When speaking of getting the band back together, vocalist Stine Bramsen says that it was always "written in the stars" that they would join forces once again.

== Music video ==
A music video to accompany the release of "Shadows" was first released on YouTube on 1 March 2019.

== Track listing ==
Digital download
| No. | Title | Length |
|---|---|---|
| 1. | "Shadows" | 2:46 |

== Charts ==
| Chart (2019) | Peak position |
|---|---|
| Denmark (Tracklisten) | 19 |

== Release history ==
| Region | Date | Format | Label |
|---|---|---|---|
| Denmark | 1 March 2019 | Digital download; streaming | Warner Music Denmark |
