= Into the Clouds =

Single by the Sound of Arrows
- Released: 21 September 2009
- Genre: Synth-pop; electronic
- Length: 3:49
- Label: Labrador; Neon Gold; White Heat
- Songwriter(s): Stefan Storm

The Sound of Arrows singles chronology
"Into the Clouds" (2009)	"Nova" (2011)

Licensed audio
- "Into the Clouds" on YouTube

"Into the Clouds" is a song by Swedish electronic music duo the Sound of Arrows. It was released as a single on 21 September 2009, and was later included on their debut studio album, Voyage (2011).

== Critical reception ==
In a Voyage review for Drowned in Sound, Krystina Nellisi said that "[o]pener 'Into the Clouds' joins in the fun with an intro sounding like the soundtrack to a late Eighties' warrior epic, a keyboard organ mode announcing their arrival into the World of Pop." Andy Baber of musicOMH praised the song's "dreamy sentiment of escapism and huge soundscape".

== Track listing ==
- CD single
1. "Into the Clouds" – 3:49
2. "And Beyond" – 5:54
3. "Into the Clouds" (Fear of Tigers remix) – 4:57
4. "Into the Clouds" (Gold Dust remix) – 5:13
- 12-inch single (limited edition)

A1. "Into the Clouds" – 3:49
A2. "And Beyond" – 5:54
B1. "Into the Clouds" (Fear of Tigers remix) – 4:57
B2: "Into the Clouds" (Gold Dust remix) – 5:13

== Personnel ==
Credits adapted from the single's liner notes.

- The Sound of Arrows – lyrics, music, production
- Jon Gray – mixing
- Dan Grech – mixing ("And Beyond")
