= Fascination (Alphabeat song) =

2006 single by Alphabeat

Single by Alphabeat

from the album Alphabeat
- Released: 6 June 2006 (Denmark); 16 May 2008 (Europe)
- Recorded: 2006
- Genre: Pop
- Length: 3:04
- Label: Charisma
- Songwriter(s): Anders Bønløkke
- Producer(s): Rune Westberg

Alphabeat singles chronology
"Fascination" (2006)	"10.000 Nights of Thunder" (2007)

Alphabeat UK singles chronology
"Fantastic 6" (2007)	"Fascination" (2008)	"10,000 Nights" (2008)

Alternative cover

"Fascination" is the first single released by Danish pop group Alphabeat. It was first released in Denmark on 6 June 2006, followed by a worldwide release on 16 May 2008. The song reached number 6 on the UK Singles Chart.

It was used as the music for a Coca-Cola advert. In Turkey, the song was used in an advertising campaign for Coca-Cola Zero, in Germany and Belgium for Coca-Cola Light. The Bimbo Jones Mix of the song was played in American Eagle Stores in the United States. It is also a playable song in the video game Band Hero and is available to play in the video game Rock Band 2 via downloadable content.

The song was also sung by all remaining contestants from series 6 of the British singing contest The X Factor, in week 3 of the live results shows. In 2010, Alphabeat performed the song on the Danish version of the show.

== UK promotion ==
Alphabeat released the song in the UK in anticipation of the international edition of their debut album. They performed the song on GMTV around the time of release and were interviewed by Fiona Phillips and Ben Shephard. On the day of release, Alphabeat performed the song on Channel 4 teatime show Richard & Judy.

== Chart performance ==
The song debuted at number 23 on the UK Singles Chart. It then rose to number seven after its physical release. A week later, it peaked at number six, fell to number 13 the following week, then rose to number 10, and for several weeks after hovered outside the top 10 at number 12 and 13. On 24 August 2008, the song rose 14 places from 73 to 59, nearly six months after it was released. The British Phonographic Industry awarded the song a Platinum certification in April 2024.

== Official remixes ==
All officially released remixes/edits (released on various promo singles) are listed below:

1. Fascination (Alphabeat vs. Frankmusik Main)
2. Fascination (Alphabeat vs. Frankmusik Edit)
3. Fascination (Alphabeat vs. Frankmusik Alternative Edit)
4. Fascination (Alternative Edit) (Him Up Her Down)
5. Fascination (Bimbo Jones Main)
6. Fascination (Bimbo Jones Edit)
7. Fascination (The Count & Sinden Remix)
8. Fascination (Instrumental)
9. Fascination (Linus Loves Dub)
10. Fascination (Linus Loves Main)
11. Fascination (Linus Loves Edit)
12. Fascination (Muzzle Flash Remix)

== Charts ==
=== Weekly charts ===
Chart (2007–2008)	Peak position
Austria (Ö3 Austria Top 40)	68
Belgium (Ultratop 50 Flanders)	2
Belgium (Ultratip Bubbling Under Wallonia)	15
Denmark (Tracklisten)	4
Germany (GfK)	45
Hungary (Rádiós Top 40)	12
Ireland (IRMA)	23
Netherlands (Dutch Top 40)	4
Netherlands (Single Top 100)	8
Scotland (OCC)	14
Slovakia (Rádio Top 100)	37
Sweden (Sverigetopplistan)	38
Switzerland (Schweizer Hitparade)	41
UK Singles (OCC)	6

=== Year-end charts ===
Chart (2008)	Position
Belgium (Ultratop 50 Flanders)	25
Europe (Eurochart Hot 100)	98
Hungary (Rádiós Top 40)	59
Netherlands (Dutch Top 40)	9
Netherlands (Single Top 100)	38
UK Singles (OCC)	42

== Certifications ==
Region	Certification	Certified units/sales
Belgium (BEA)	Gold	20,000^{‡}
United Kingdom (BPI)	Platinum	600,000^{‡}
^{‡} Sales+streaming figures based on certification alone.
