= Boyfriend (Alphabeat song) =

2007 single by Alphabeat

Single by Alphabeat

from the album Alphabeat
- Released: 1 October 2007
- Recorded: 2007
- Genre: Pop; dance-pop
- Length: 3:37 (original version); 3:15 (European album remix); 2:59 (UK radio edit)
- Label: Copenhagen
- Songwriter(s): Anders Bønløkke
- Producer(s): Rune Westberg (original version); Mike Spencer (UK radio edit)

Alphabeat singles chronology
| "Fantastic 6" (2007) | "Boyfriend" (2007) | "Go Go" (2008) |

Alphabeat UK singles chronology
| "10,000 Nights" (2008) | "Boyfriend" (2008) | "What Is Happening" (2008) |

"Boyfriend" is a song by Alphabeat. A new version, produced by Mike Spencer, was released as their third UK single. Radio 1 put the song on their A List. The song was inspired by a Swedish film that depicted a teenage, lesbian romance.

== Music videos ==
There have so far been two music video versions. A Danish one, directed by Daniel Eskils features the band performing and having their instruments drawn on the wall.

A second video was released in the UK and involves the group performing in front of tape recorders, while Anders SG becomes wrapped up by the tapes.

== Track listings ==
CD single

1. Boyfriend
2. Black & Gold (Radio 1 Live Lounge session)

iTunes exclusive vingle

1. Boyfriend
2. Boyfriend (Live @ Koko)
3. A Message
4. Boyfriend (video)

Standard mixes bundle

1. Boyfriend
2. Boyfriend Alex Metric Mix
3. Boyfriend Bloody Beetroot Mix
4. Boyfriend Dave Spoon Remix
5. Boyfriend Caged Baby Remix
6. Boyfriend Pete Hammond Mix (radio edit)
7. Boyfriend WaWa Remix (radio edit)

== Charts ==
| Chart (2007–2008) | Peak position |
|---|---|
| Belgium (Ultratop 50 Flanders) | 14 |
| Denmark (Tracklisten) | 11 |
| Ireland (IRMA) | 49 |
| Netherlands (Dutch Top 40) | 12 |
| Netherlands (Single Top 100) | 71 |
| Scotland (OCC) | 8 |
| UK Singles (OCC) | 15 |
