= Nova (The Sound of Arrows song) =

Single by The Sound of Arrows
- Released: 25 April 2011
- Genre: Synthpop, electronic
- Length: 3:29
- Label: Major Label, Geffen, Polydor
- Songwriter(s): Stefan Storm, plus unknown writer

The Sound of Arrows singles chronology
"Into the Clouds" (2009)	"Nova" (2011)	"Magic" (2011)

Nova is the second single by Swedish duo The Sound of Arrows.

The singer of The Sound of Arrows, Stefan Storm, described what this song is about: "It’s a song that we actually struggled with a fair bit in its creation. It just wouldn’t sit right and we’ve got at least three different productions of it lying around on the computer, but it’s finally seeing the light. I’m very happy with how the lyrics came out in the end, the second verse especially."

Nova is about escapism, which is quite a common theme for The Sound of Arrows – kind of what the whole album is about: wanting something better when you're stuck in a rut and just driving toward an ideal. Sometimes, it can be great because it can get you places, but it's sometimes like you're diluting yourself into thinking that there is always something better out there. It goes both ways. It's somewhat like hope but still there is a part of hopelessness.

== Video clip ==
There is a real cave in the video; it's about 200 – 300 meters below ground. The shooting took 48 hours. It was filmed in summer so it was super, super warm but very cold down in the cave. The experience of shooting the video was described as terrible, but worth it in the end.

- Artist: The Sound of Arrows
- Title: Nova (Geffen)
- Director: The Sound of Arrows, Mattias Erik Johansson
- Production Company: Naive, Black Neon, Shameless
- Producer: Pinar Metin, Joel Burman
- DoP: Sam Goldie
- 1st AD: Christer Jonsson
- Make Up: Cissi Wallin
- Stylist: Fransicka Svensson
- Art Director): TSOA/Mattias Erik Johansson
- Gaffer: Anders Hedqvist
- Editor: Hannes Falk
- Colourist: Oskar Mellander
- Post Production: Oskar Gullstrand
- Styling: IR Erik Annerborn

== Track listings ==
- CD
1. «Nova» — 3:29
2. «Nova» (Instrumental)
3. «Nova» (Tiësto Remix)
4. «Nova» (II Figures Remix)
- vinyl 12"

Side A

1. «Nova»
2. «Nova» (Instrumental)

Side B

1. «Nova» (Tiësto Remix)
2. «Nova» (II Figures Remix)
- CDr
1. «Nova» (Radio Edit) — 3:28
2. «Nova» (Tiësto Remix) — 7:48
3. «Nova» (Almighty Anthem Edit) — 3:39
4. «Nova» (Almighty Anthem Remix) — 6:38
5. «Nova» (Steep Remix) — 3:17
- CDr
1. «Nova» (Almighty Essential Radio Edit) — 3:35
2. «Nova» (Almighty Anthem Radio Edit) — 3:36
3. «Nova» (Almighty Essential Club Mix) — 7:16
4. «Nova» (Almighty Anthem Club Mix) — 6:31

== Personnel ==
- The Sound of Arrows — lyrics, music, production

== Miscellaneous awards and honors ==
Year	Award/honor	Nominator
04.10.2011	10 Best Free MP3 Downloads This Week (#5)	NME
10.12.2011	Obligatory List 2011 (#5)	In At Number 40
