= 10.000 Nights of Thunder =

2007 single by Alphabeat

Single by Alphabeat

from the album Alphabeat
- Released: 15 January 2007
- Genre: Pop
- Length: 4:27 (album version); 3:32 (UK radio edit)
- Label: Charisma; Copenhagen
- Songwriter(s): Anders Bønløkke
- Producer(s): Rune Westberg

Alphabeat singles chronology
"Fascination" (2006)	"10.000 Nights of Thunder" (2007)	"Fantastic 6" (2007)

Alphabeat UK singles chronology
"Fascination" (2008)	"10.000 Nights of Thunder" (2008)	"Boyfriend" (2008)

Audio
- "10.000 Nights of Thunder" on YouTube

"10.000 Nights of Thunder" is the second single by Danish pop band Alphabeat. It was released in the UK as "10,000 Nights" in anticipation of This Is Alphabeat, the international version of their debut album. It topped the chart in Alphabeat's native Denmark and peaked at number 16 on the UK Singles Chart.

The band played a live semi-acoustic version of the track in Jo Whiley's Live Lounge on BBC Radio 1, together with a cover version of Sam Sparro's "Black and Gold". An instrumental version of the track was used as background music by the BBC during their daily Beijing 2008 Olympics highlights show.

== Track listings ==
European CD single

1. "10,000 Nights" (radio edit)
2. "10,000 Nights" (instrumental)

UK CD1

1. "10,000 Nights" (radio edit) – 3:32
2. "Digital Love" (live session) – 2:51

UK CD2

1. "10,000 Nights" (radio edit)
2. "10,000 Nights" (Bimbo Jones remix)
3. "Fascination" (Alphabeat vs Frankmusik)
4. "10,000 Nights" (video)

== Chart performance ==
"10.000 Nights of Thunder" peaked in Denmark at number one, where it stayed for one week. In the United Kingdom, the song entered at number 23 on downloads alone, then climbed to number 16 once the physical single was released. On 27 July 2008, the song moved up four places from number 40 to number 36 before dropping out of the top 40 two weeks later.

=== Weekly charts ===
Chart (2007–2008)	Peak position
Belgium (Ultratip Bubbling Under Flanders)	6
Denmark (Tracklisten)	1
Netherlands (Dutch Top 40)	24
Netherlands (Single Top 100)	61
Scotland (OCC)	10
UK Singles (OCC)	16

=== Year-end charts ===
Chart (2008)	Position
UK Singles (OCC)	113
