= DJ (Alphabeat song) =

Single by Alphabeat

from the album The Spell
- Released: 9 January 2010
- Genre: Dance-pop; Europop
- Length: 3:28
- Label: Copenhagen
- Songwriter: Anders B (Anders Bonlokke)
- Producer: Anders B

Alphabeat singles chronology
"The Spell" (2009)	"DJ" (2010)	"Hole in My Heart" (2010)

Alternative cover
- UK cover

"DJ" is a song by Danish pop band Alphabeat, released as the second single from their second studio album, The Spell (2009). The song peaked at number six on the Danish Singles Chart, and was certified gold by IFPI Denmark on 20 April 2010 for sales in excess of 15,000 copies.

In the United Kingdom, "DJ" was released in May 2010 as the third single from the international version of the album, The Beat Is... The track was remixed by Biffco and promoted as "DJ (I Could Be Dancing)" for the single release.

== Track listings ==
- Danish digital single
1. "DJ" – 3:17
- UK CD single
1. "DJ (I Could Be Dancing)" (Biffco Single Edit) – 3:13
2. "DJ (I Could Be Dancing)" (Doman & Gooding Radio Edit) – 3:00
3. "DJ (I Could Be Dancing)" (Fascination Edit) – 3:43
- UK 12" single

A. "DJ (I Could Be Dancing)" (Biffco 12" Mix) – 5:12
B. "DJ (I Could Be Dancing)" (Doman & Gooding Remix) – 4:56

- UK digital EP
1. "DJ (I Could Be Dancing)" (Radio Mix) – 3:11
2. "DJ (I Could Be Dancing)" (Fascination Remix) – 7:36
3. "DJ (I Could Be Dancing)" (Doman & Gooding Club Mix) – 4:55
4. "DJ (I Could Be Dancing)" (Biffco Extended Mix) – 5:11
5. "DJ (I Could Be Dancing)" (Ian Masterson 12" Remix) – 7:14

== Charts ==
=== Weekly charts ===
Chart (2010)	Peak position
Denmark (Tracklisten)	6
UK Singles (Official Charts Company)	116

=== Year-end charts ===
Chart (2010)	Position
Denmark (Tracklisten)	25

=== Certifications ===
Region	Certification	Certified units/sales
Denmark (IFPI Danmark)	Gold	15,000^{^}
^{^} Shipments figures based on certification alone.

== Release history ==
Region	Date	Format	Label	Ref.
Denmark	9 January 2010	Digital download	Copenhagen	
United Kingdom	30 May 2010	Digital download	Fascination; Polydor	
United Kingdom	31 May 2010	CD single; 12" single	Fascination; Polydor	
