= Vacation (Alphabeat song) =

Single by Alphabeat

from the album Express Non-Stop
- Released: 12 March 2012
- Recorded: 2011
- Genre: Dance-pop; Europop
- Length: 2:54
- Label: Copenhagen; Universal
- Songwriters: Anders SG Nielsen; Anders Bønløkke
- Producer: Alphabeat

Alphabeat singles chronology
"Heat Wave" (2010)	"Vacation" (2012)	"Love Sea" (2012)

"Vacation" is a song by Danish pop band Alphabeat, released on 12 March 2012 as the lead single from their third studio album, Express Non-Stop (2012). The song was originally intended to be released in the United States on the same date, but due to "faults in the system", it was ultimately released on 26 March 2012. The song peaked at number fifteen on the Danish Singles Chart. Alphabeat performed "Vacation" live on the season five finale of the Danish version of X Factor on 23 March 2012.

== Track listing ==
- Digital download
1. "Vacation" – 2:54

== Charts ==
Chart (2012)	Peak position
Denmark (Tracklisten)	15
Denmark Airplay (Tracklisten)	1
Netherlands (Tipparade)	19

== Release history ==
Region	Date	Format	Label
Denmark	12 March 2012	Digital download	Copenhagen Records; Universal Music
France	12 March 2012	Digital download	Copenhagen Records; Universal Music
Germany	12 March 2012	Digital download	Copenhagen Records; Universal Music
United Kingdom	12 March 2012	Digital download	Copenhagen Records; Universal Music
Canada	26 March 2012	Digital download	Copenhagen Records; Universal Music
United States	26 March 2012	Digital download	Copenhagen Records; Universal Music
