= The Spell (Alphabeat song) =

Single by Alphabeat

from the album The Spell
- Released: 21 September 2009
- Genre: Dance-pop; synthpop; Europop
- Length: 3:37
- Label: Copenhagen
- Songwriters: Anders SG (Anders SG Nielsen); Anders B (Anders Bonlokke)
- Producers: Anders SG; Anders B

Alphabeat singles chronology
"What Is Happening" (2008)	"The Spell" (2009)	"DJ" (2010)

"The Spell" is a song by Danish pop band Alphabeat, released as the lead single from their second studio album of the same name (2009). The song topped the Danish Singles Chart for four non-consecutive weeks and was certified platinum by IFPI Denmark on 4 January 2010, denoting sales in excess of 30,000 copies. The music video for "The Spell" was directed by Toben Seymour, who also directed the band's previous video, "What Is Happening".

== Track listings ==
- Danish digital single
1. "The Spell" – 3:39
- UK CD single and 7" single
1. "The Spell" – 3:37
2. "The Spell" (Digital Dog Remix) – 2:49
- UK digital single
1. "The Spell" – 3:37
2. "The Spell" (Digital Dog Remix) – 2:49
3. "The Spell" (Buzz Junkies Remix) – 3:27

== Charts ==
=== Weekly charts ===
Weekly chart performance for "The Spell"
Chart (2009–10)	Peak position
Belgium (Ultratip Bubbling Under Flanders)	6
Belgium (Ultratip Bubbling Under Wallonia)	13
Denmark (Tracklisten)	1
Denmark Airplay (Tracklisten)	1
Netherlands (Dutch Top 40)	11
Netherlands (Single Top 100)	30
UK Singles (OCC)	20

=== Year-end charts ===
Annual chart rankings for "The Spell"
Chart (2009)	Position
Denmark (Tracklisten)	11
Chart (2010)	Position
Netherlands (Dutch Top 40)	70

== Release history ==
Region	Date	Format(s)	Label	Ref.
Denmark	21 September 2009	Digital download	Copenhagen	
United Kingdom	18 October 2009	Digital download	Fascination; Polydor	
United Kingdom	19 October 2009	CD single; 7" single	Fascination; Polydor	
