= The Sound of Arrows =

Swedish electronic music duo

- Origin: Gävle, Sweden
- Genres: Synth-pop, dream pop, indie pop
- Years active: 2006–present
- Labels: Geffen, Labrador, Neon Gold, Skies Above
- Members: Stefan Storm; Oskar Gullstrand

The Sound of Arrows are a Swedish electronic music duo originally from Gävle, and now based in Stockholm. The duo, consisting of Oskar Gullstrand and Stefan Storm, have remixed tracks for artists such as Lady Gaga, Alphabeat, The Naked and Famous, Natalia Kills and Nicole Scherzinger. They also produced the song "Shoot the Bullet" for electropop artist Queen of Hearts. The duo cite English band OMD as an inspiration.

The band's song "Into the Clouds" was among the most downloaded songs in the United Kingdom for the week of 20 September 2009. Their major-label debut single, "Nova", was released in March 2011 by Geffen Records, and its accompanying music video premiered on Popjustice on 21 February 2011. The follow-up single "Magic" was released in August 2011, having previously been used in a television commercial for the Mitsubishi Outlander car. The duo's debut album, Voyage, was released in November 2011. In 2015, the band announced plans to release a second album. On 17 March 2017, the band released the single "Beautiful Life", their first in five years. Their second album Stay Free was released on their own label in October 2017 on transparent vinyl record and CD through the band's website and in digital form, to mixed reviews. Their music has been described as "more heavenly Swedish dream-pop".

== Discography ==
- Voyage (2011)
- Stay Free (2017)

== Awards and nominations ==
=== Musiclip Festival ===
The Musiclip Festival is an annual Spanish festival of music, audiovisual arts and music video.

Year	Nominee / work	Award	Result
2011	"Magic"	Best International Music Video	Won

=== P3 Gold Awards ===
The P3 Gold Award is an annual music award held by Swedish Sveriges Radio.

Year	Nominee / work	Award	Result
2012	Voyage	Best Pop Artist	Nominated

=== Scandipop Awards ===
The Scandipop Awards are an annual British online music award.

Year	Nominee / work	Award	Result
2012	The Sound of Arrows	Best Group	Nominated
2012	Voyage	Best Group Album	Nominated
2012	The Sound of Arrows	Readers Favourite of 2011	Nominated

=== Miscellaneous accolades ===
Year	Nominated work	Accolade	Nominator
2011	Voyage	Idolator's Favorite 10 albums Out of '11	Idolator
2011	Voyage	Top Albums of the Year 2011 (#1)	Bop 2 Pop
2011	Voyage	Top 20 Albums of 2011 (#1)	Hits From Another Planet
2011	Voyage	The Top 31 LP’s of ’11 (#12)	AdemWithAnE.com
2011	Voyage	The Top 33 Albums of 2011 (#3)	Popjustice
2011	Voyage	Best Album 2011 (Readers' Poll) (#5)	Popjustice
2011	—N/a	Best New Act to properly get going in 2011 (Readers' Poll) (#4)	Popjustice
2011	—N/a	Most Underrated Pop Act 2011 (Readers' Poll) (#7)	Popjustice
2011	"Nova"	The Top 45 Singles of 2011 (#33)	Popjustice
2011	"Nova"	EQ's Top 100 Singles of 2011 (#30)	EQ Music Blog
2011	"Nova" (Tiësto Remix)	TOP100 2011 (#62)	KISS FM
2011	"Ruins of Rome"	The Singles of 2011 (#23)	Neon Gold Records

== See also ==
- List of dream pop artists
- List of Geffen Records artists
- List of Swedes in music
- List of synth-pop artists
