= Alphabeat =

Danish pop band

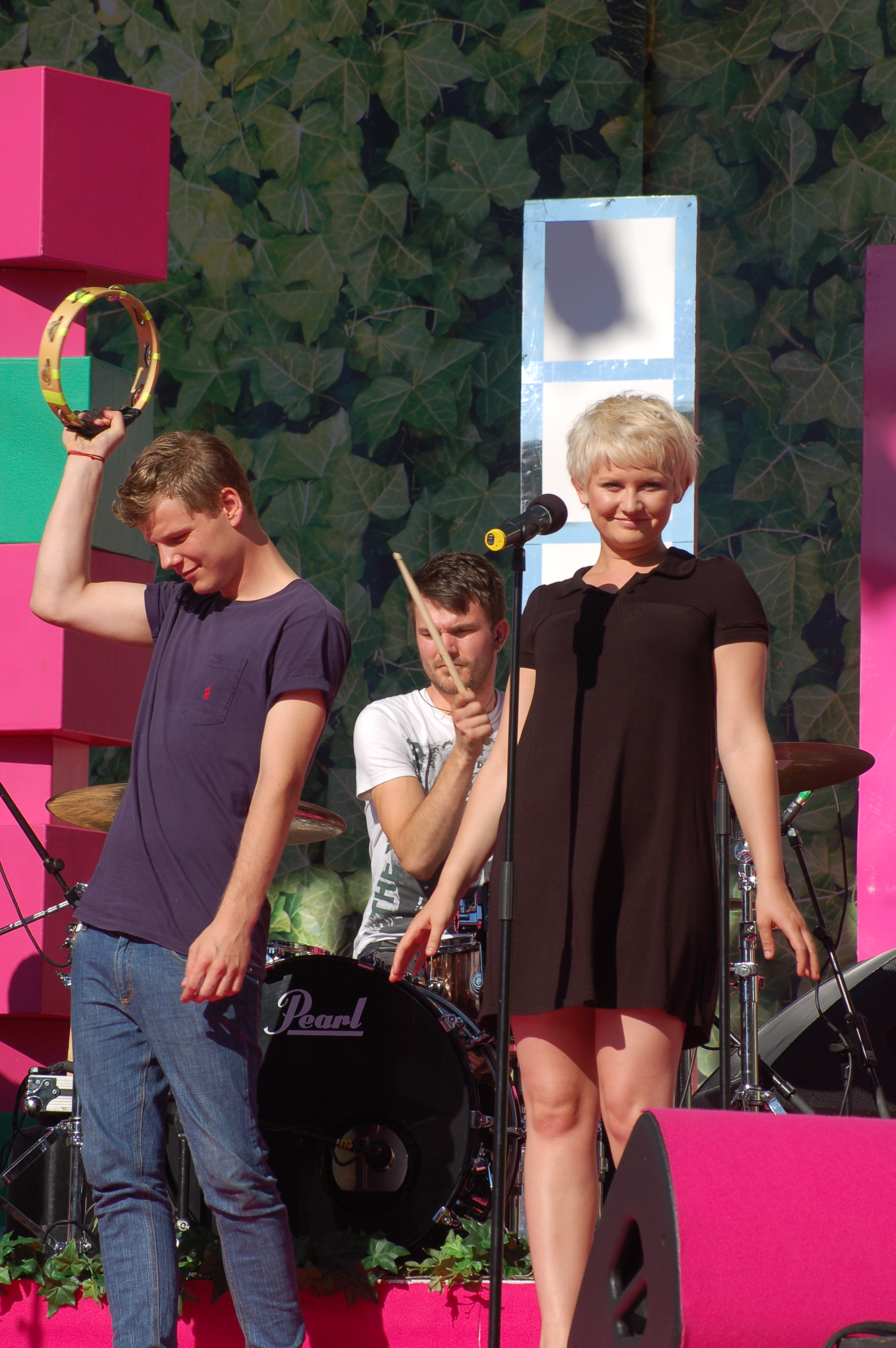
- Alphabeat performing at Gröna Lund in Stockholm on 26 July 2008

Background information
- Origin: Silkeborg, Denmark
- Genres: Dance-pop; Europop; indie pop; house; wonky pop
- Years active: 2003–2013; 2019–2021; 2025–present
- Labels: Copenhagen; Charisma; Polydor; Fascination; Atlantic; Neon Gold; Warner
- Members: Anders SG; Stine Bramsen; Anders B; Rasmus Nagel; Anders Reinholdt; Troels Møller
- Website: www.alphabeat.dk

Alphabeat are a Danish pop band from Silkeborg, fronted by singers Stine Bramsen and Anders Stig Gehrt Nielsen. Their single "Fascination" was a major hit in Denmark during the summer of 2006, as well as the United Kingdom in 2008. Their 2007 eponymous debut album reached number two in Denmark and was certified Platinum. Following its wide release in Europe in 2008, retitled This Is Alphabeat, it reached number ten in the UK and was certified Gold in the region. The album also contains their first number one hit in Denmark, "10.000 Nights of Thunder".

In 2009, Alphabeat released the album The Spell; the song of the same name was a number one hit in Denmark. The Spell was reissued as The Beat Is... in the UK in 2010. They went on to release the albums Express Non-Stop (2012), and Don't Know What's Cool Anymore (2019). They have amassed 11 top twenty singles in their native Denmark.

== History ==
=== 2003–2009: Formation, early career and Alphabeat ===
Alphabeat is made up of six members: lead vocalists Anders Stig Gehrt "Anders SG" Nielsen and Stine Bramsen alongside Anders "Anders B" Bønløkke, Rasmus Nagel, Anders Reinholdt and Troels Møller.

The group first formed in 2003 under the name Sodastar, in the Danish town of Silkeborg. As Sodastar, they won the 2004 edition of Danish music contest LiveContest DK, which enabled the creation of a self-titled EP and 16-date promotional tour. In 2006, the group changed their name to Alphabeat, to avoid confusion with a German band.

The band's eponymous debut album, Alphabeat, was released in Denmark on 5 March 2007, peaking at number two on the Danish Albums Chart and reaching platinum status in five months of release. It was preceded by the singles "Fascination" in June 2006 and "10.000 Nights of Thunder" in January 2007. The former peaked at number 4 in Denmark, while the latter was a number 1 hit.

The band's success in their domestic market attracted the attention of several major labels from larger markets abroad and Alphabeat was eventually signed to EMI's Charisma Records label in the United Kingdom. Their debut UK single, "Fantastic 6", was released on 26 November 2007, followed by the international release of Alphabeat the following year, retitled This Is Alphabeat and featuring a revised track listing. It peaked at number ten on the UK Albums Chart and was certified gold by the British Phonographic Industry on 10 October 2008. "Fascination" was released in the UK in May 2008, peaked at number 6, and was certified Gold. This was followed by the UK release of "10.000 Nights of Thunder" (retitled "10,000 Nights"), which peaked at number 16. Later single releases from the album included "Boyfriend" (DEN #11, UK #15), "Go-Go" (DEN #14), and "What is Happening". On 19 January 2009, Alphabeat announced that they had parted ways with their UK label Charisma Records.

=== 2009–2013: The Spell and Express Non-Stop ===
It was announced on 7 March 2009 that Alphabeat had signed a new record deal with Polydor Records. The band's manager said, "We are thrilled to be signing to one of the UK's most successful record companies, and looking forward to achieving even more success with the band and Polydor in the coming years." That year, Alphabeat won an EBBA Award.

In August 2009, Popjustice premiered their single "The Spell", which was released on 21 September 2009. The song was a number one hit in Denmark and peaked at number 20 in the UK. On 26 October 2009, their second studio album The Spell was released in Denmark, where it charted at number five and was certified gold in less than two months of release. The UK release of the album was originally set for November 2009, but it was subsequently pushed back until 1 March 2010 and the album's title was changed to The Beat Is... It debuted and peaked at number thirty-nine on the UK Albums Chart.

On 9 January 2010 "DJ" was released as the second single in the Danish market where it peaked at number 6. The second UK single, "Hole in My Heart", was released on 22 February 2010 and debuted and peaked at number twenty-nine on the UK Singles Chart. In May 2010, "DJ" was released as the third single from the album in the UK, retitled "DJ (I Could Be Dancing)"; its single version was remixed by Biffco. The song peaked at number 116 on the UK Singles Chart. In June 2010, "Heat Wave" was released as the third single from the album in Denmark (but fourth overall), and peaked at number 4.

Alphabeat's third studio album, Express Non-Stop, was released on 24 September 2012. The album's first single, "Vacation", was released as a digital download in the UK on 12 March 2012. A second single, "Love Sea", was released on iTunes on 13 August 2012. Two more singles, "X-Mas (Let's Do It Again)" and "Show Me What Love Is" were released from the album before the band went on hiatus to focus on side projects in 2013.

=== 2013–2019: Hiatus and solo projects ===
On 18 September 2013, after a series of gigs supporting Express Non-Stop, Alphabeat posted that they were "over and out" on their social media feeds, suggesting the band were taking hiatus.

On 23 September, it was confirmed that lead vocalist Stine Bramsen had signed a recording contract to produce her own solo album. The album, Fiftyseven, was released on 9 October 2015 and reached number 1 on the Danish charts. It was proceeded in 2015 by a self-titled EP and succeeded in 2018 by a second EP, Bruised.

In July 2014, vocalist Anders SG and guitarist Anders Bønløkke formed production duo THANKS, releasing the single "Comeback Girl." The duo returned in 2016 with new track "Dizzy" and continued to release music until 2018, with the release of the album Mind Expansion.

On 1 June 2018, Alphabeat released a 10th Anniversary edition of This is Alphabeat exclusively on vinyl. The record featured an adjusted tracklisting, using the original recording of "Nothing But My Baby" and including "Into the Jungle" and "Ocean Blue", both also from the album's original release.

=== 2019–2021: Don't Know What's Cool Anymore and second split ===
Following a six-year hiatus, Alphabeat signed a new recording deal with Atlantic Records and released a new song, "Shadows", in March 2019. The band made a series of performance events in the United States, led by a Neon Gold Records showcase at the SXSW event on 13 March 2019, as well as a tour of their native Denmark, as part of Grøn Koncert during July 2019. On 30 August 2019, Alphabeat released the single "I Don't Know What's Cool Anymore".

The band held a 10-date tour of Denmark throughout February 2020, which was followed by an additional three dates in the United Kingdom in April 2020. On 23 September 2019, "Shadows" was nominated for 'Radio Hit of the Year' at the 2019 Danish Music Awards. A day later, the music video for "I Don't Know What's Cool Anymore" was released, directed by band members Rasmus Nagel and Anders Reinholdt.

On 1 November 2019, the band released their fourth studio album Don't Know What's Cool Anymore. On 16 November 2019, the band released a music video for the album track "Sing a Song". The following day, Danish television channel DR3 premiered a documentary series focusing on Alpahabeat. Titled Alphabeat - Da Festen Forsvandt (English: Alphabeat - When the Party Disappeared), the 4-part series explores the group's relationships and troubles surrounding the release of their 2012 album and 2013 hiatus. On 15 May 2020 it was announced that "Shadows" had been nominated for the "Most Played Song of the Year" at the Carl Prisen Awards. On 26 June 2020, Alphabeat released "Sometimes 2020", a reworking of their 2019 song "Sometimes".

On 4 June 2021, the group released "Danmarks Dynamite" (English: Denmark's Dynamite), the official Danish song for the postponed 2020 UEFA Championship. The track marks the band's first release in Danish and is a collaboration with members of the Denmark national football team. An accompanying music video for the song premiered on 9 June.

On 24 September 2021, the group played Fredagsrock, the Friday-night concert event at Copenhagen amusement park Tivoli. A day later, the group confirmed via social media that this was "the final outdoor Alphabeat show ever". On 16 October they played their last gig, part of a 9-date tour of Denmark previously billed as their "last tour... for now." On 9 December 2021, the band shared a behind-the-scenes video of their final show to their Facebook account. Alongside this, they shared the reasoning behind their second split, explaining that whilst they had "no plans on writing new songs or to go on tour again", they did not rule out a future return.

Following these shows, lead singer Stine Bramsen returned to her solo work, starting with the comeback single "What I Want You to Do" on 24 September 2021. A year later, in September 2022, Anders SG also began a solo career, releasing the debut single "Noget for Nogen".

In January 2024, band members Stine Bramsen, Anders SG and Anders Bønløkke were credited amongst the co-writers of "Real Love", a song by Danish artist RoseeLu. It was amongst the competitors of that year's Dansk Melodi Grand Prix, the Danish pre-selection for the Eurovision Song Contest.

=== 2025–present: Second return ===
After a four-year hiatus, on 30 April 2025 it was announced that Alphabeat were to make a comeback as part of that year's Grøn Koncert series of festivals. These shows will be preceded by two "pre-shows" at Kvindernes Bygning (København) on 1 and 2 July.

== Touring ==
Alphabeat made their UK debut at Monto Water Rats in May 2007 and later that year embarked on their first UK tour (The Wolfbaggin' tour), supporting Lil Chris and Daniel Powter. They were offered the chance to open for the Spice Girls during their 2007–08 Return of the Spice Girls tour, but declined the opportunity, feeling that it would be "too weird" to suddenly play in front of a 23,000 audience unfamiliar with the band's music.

They have often been associated with the wonky pop movement—their manager owns the brand name—and they have played a number of Wonky Pop events and tours.

During the summer of 2008 they played numerous British and international festivals including T in the Park on "Camper's Friday", Roskilde Festival, T4 on the Beach, Summerfestival (in Klaksvík, Faroe Islands, in early August), and in October 2008, along with many other bands at the National Exhibition Centre in Birmingham, England for hundreds of young girlguides.

During late 2008, Alphabeat began a twenty-two-gig tour in the UK and the Netherlands, with many shows sold out. In the same year, the band was planning to play select shows with American singer Katy Perry on her 2008 world tour. However, in March 2009, Alphabeat cancelled their appearances in support of her US tour. Their management stated that they were instead working on their second album and planned to tour the US later in the year.

They performed a mini UK tour to promote The Spell in autumn 2009 and toured the UK throughout April 2010, on The Beat Is... Tour. They also played a support slot for Lady Gaga on the UK and Irish leg of her The Monster Ball Tour, which took place in February and March 2010. They made their US debut at the 2010 SXSW Festival. In June 2010, they co-headlined with Wheatus at Trinity May Ball, in Cambridge, UK.

On 26 July 2011, Alphabeat were the midline act at the pre-event party for the UK contingent of 4000 scouts, the night before leaving for the 22nd World Scout Jamboree in Sweden. The year after, on 28 July 2012, Alphabeat performed as the closing act for Jamboree Denmark 2012.

== Members ==
- Stine Bramsen – vocals
- Anders Stig Gehrt "Anders SG" Nielsen – vocals, percussion, acoustic guitar
- Anders "Anders B" Bønløkke – guitar, keyboards, backing vocals
- Anders Reinholdt – bass, keyboards, backing vocals
- Rasmus Nagel – keyboards, backing vocals
- Troels Møller – drums, backing vocals

== Discography ==
- Alphabeat (2007)
- The Spell (2009)
- Express Non-Stop (2012)
- Don't Know What's Cool Anymore (2019)

== Solo projects ==
=== Stine Bramsen ===
In 2011, Bramsen's vocals were featured in the dance hit "I Want You (To Want Me Back)", by Danish duo Morten Hampenberg & Alexander Brown. The single was certified gold in Sweden.

Following Alphabeat's hiatus in 2013, Bramsen pursued a solo career and began releasing music under her own name. In 2013, she featured on the single "32" by Danish rock band Carpark North. In January 2014, she released her first single, "Prototypical", which appeared at number 2 on the Hitlisten Danish Singles Chart in its first week of release. This was followed by "Move Forward", on 30 May 2014, and "The Day You Leave Me", which was released 31 October 2014. A fourth single, "Karma Town", followed on 9 February 2015, which charted at number 30.

A self-titled EP was then released on 27 March 2015, consisting of Bramen's previous singles, alongside two new tracks. This peaked at number 11 on the Danish Albums Chart. Bramsen then went on to release one more single, "Woman", on 5 September 2015, before releasing her debut solo album, "Fiftyseven", on 9 October 2015. The album peaked at number 1 in Denmark.

Bramsen's next release was the song "Keep Dreaming", in collaboration with Danish DJ Hedegaard, released 9 September 2016. This was followed by three solo singles, "L.A.C.K." on 13 October 2017, "You're Not Giving Up" on 15 March 2018 and "Can't Get Over You" on 4 May 2018. These three songs became part of Bramsen's second EP, "Bruised", released 1 June 2018. A follow-up single, "Can't Let It Go" featuring Danish soul and R&B singer Patrick Dorgan, was released in October 2018.

On 11 October 2020, Bramsen featured on the Danish reality series Toppen af Poppen. A single, "Backwards" featuring Søren Huss, was released to complement her appearance. In June 2021, Bramsen featured on the Volbeat track "Dagen Før" (English: The Day Before). Released 2 June, this marked Bramen's first commercially released song performed in Danish, pre-dating "Danmarks Dynamite" by two days.

Following Alphabeat's second split, Bramsen returned to her solo work, releasing the single "What I Want You to Do" on 24 September 2021. This was followed on 4 March 2022, with "Mother Earth" and "Sex It Away" on 12 August 2022. These formed part of Bramsen's second album, Blonde & Blank, which was released on 28 October 2022. The album was well received by critics, with GAFFA awarding it 5 out of 6 stars. It was supported by various live shows, including a 20-date acoustic tour of Denmark in Autumn 2023, where Bramsen led an all-female band.

In June 2022, Bramsen featured on the official Danish song for the UEFA Women's Euro 2022, accompanied by members of the Denmark women's national football team and produced by Lidt Til Lægterne.

In August 2022, Bramsen featured in the DR television series Min Sang til Danmark, a programme in which Danish musicians are challenged to write a song celebrating the country. To accompany her appearance, the promotional single "Det Er Mit Land" was released on 19 August.

=== Thanks ===
In July 2014, lead singer Anders SG, and guitarist Anders B, formed a solo project called Thanks. They have described their sound as "Motown meets EDM anno 2014. The Jets produced by Calvin Harris and Rostam Batmanglij with Phil Spector on the line". On 24 July, the duo released a music video for their first single "Comeback Girl".

Two years later, on 14 April 2016, the duo returned with new track "Dizzy". This was followed on 19 August 2016 with "Livin' My Life", a remix of Jill Scott's "Golden", and on 9 December 2016 with "Your Man", a track featuring the vocals of Australian singer Sam Sparro. Three more singles followed, "I Can Get" featuring Go Go Berlin singer Christian Vium on 23 June 2017, "Sunshine" on 30 January 2018 and "Mind Expansion" on 13 February 2018.

The duo then released their latest single, "Good Thing" on 1 March 2018, before releasing their debut album, named after previous single "Mind Expansion", on 16 March. An EP of remixes by Ted Jasper, Blüsh and Aaron Brockovich was released 29 June 2018.

The pair have also contributed remixes of the Andrew McMahon in the Wilderness song "So Close", in 2017, and the Weezer song "Happy Hour", in 2018.

In January 2021, it was reported that SG and Bønløkke had composed a new version of the theme tune to Lykkehjulet, the Danish version of game show Wheel of Fortune.

In September 2022, the pair were credited as composers of an advert for TV 2 Play, the video on demand service of Danish TV network TV 2. The clip, titled "The Sound of TV 2 PLAY", features singer-songwriter Saveus.

=== Frankie and Me ===
In June 2022, Anders SG featured with Danish musician Frank Ziyanak on the single "I'm Only Alone Without You". Released under the name 'Frankie and Me,' SG later revealed via Instagram that the song was first written "11 years ago".

The pair returned in 2024, with the single "Lip Gloss Kiss" released on 24 March, followed by a reissue of "I'm Only Alone Without You" on 5 April. Both these tracks appeared on the 9-track album The Crowd Goes Wild Without Me, released 12 April.

=== Anders SG ===
In August 2022, SG again took to Instagram, posting that he had "been making a lot of music", suggesting he was to release further tracks. On 19 September this was confirmed, with the announcement of a debut solo single, album and tour.

SG's first single under his own name, "Noget For Nogen" (English: Something For Someone), was subsequently released on 23 September. A day later, on 24 September, SG appeared on Danish radio station DR P4 to promote the single. Two more singles have since followed, "Den Arbejdende Mand" (English: The Working Man) on 28 October 2022 and "Penge På Lomme" (English: Money In Your Pocket) on 3 February 2023.

In February 2023, SG was part of a 5-member jury for that year's Danish Eurovision selection programme Dansk Melodi Grand Prix. The other jurors included Eurovision 2013 winner Emmelie de Forest.

=== Bye Bye Brenda ===
In December 2024, it was announced that lead vocalist Stine Bramsen was to collaborate with Danish-Icelandic musician Kajsa Vala on an Americana-influenced project called 'Bye Bye Brenda.' Their first single, "Drive With Our Eyes Closed," was subsequently released on 20 December whilst an album, Landmarks, followed on 10 January 2025.

The pair's latest release is the single "Worry Never Wins (feat. NATURE)", released 22 April 2025. The track is a collaboration with "Earth/Percent, a climate-focused charity founded by Brian Eno."

In 2025, the duo will appear at various festivals, including Spot and Roskilde, as well partaking on a 22-date headline tour throughout Denmark between September and November.
