= Alphabeat (album) =

Studio album by Alphabeat
- Released: 5 March 2007
- Recorded: 2006–2008
- Studio: Miloco Studios, London
- Genre: Pop; dance-pop; indie pop
- Length: 39:29
- Label: Copenhagen; Charisma
- Producer: Alphabeat; Mike Spencer; Rune Westberg

Alphabeat chronology
Alphabeat (2007)	The Spell (2009)

Alternative cover
- This Is Alphabeat cover

Singles from Alphabeat
- 1. "Fascination" Released: 6 June 2006; 2. "10.000 Nights of Thunder" Released: 15 January 2007; 3. "Fantastic 6" Released: 23 April 2007; 4. "Boyfriend" Released: 1 October 2007; 5. "Go-Go" Released: 21 April 2008; 6. "What Is Happening" Released: 24 November 2008

Alphabeat is the debut studio album by Danish band Alphabeat. It was first released in Denmark on 5 March 2007 by Copenhagen Records, and eventually in the rest of Europe in 2008 under the title This Is Alphabeat by the revived Charisma Records with an alternative track listing.

In June 2018, This is Alphabeat was re-released exclusively on vinyl, in celebration of the album's 10th anniversary.

== Release ==
Alphabeat was first released in Denmark on 5 March 2007. In 2008, the album was widely released in Europe, retitled This is Alphabeat. The European release features remixes of several of the album's tracks in favor of the originals: "Boyfriend", "Rubber Boots/Mackintosh" (retitled "Rubber Boots"), and "Nothing But My Baby" were all remixed for the release. In addition, the tracks "Into the Jungle", "The Hours", and "Ocean Blue" were removed from the track listing and replaced with new tracks "Go-Go", "Touch Me Touching You", and "Public Image".

=== Singles ===
"Fascination" was released as the album's first single in June 2006. It charted at number four on the Danish Singles Chart. In the United Kingdom, it was released as the album's second single in May 2008. It peaked at number six on the UK Singles Chart and number seven on the UK Official Download Chart.

"10.000 Nights of Thunder" was the second single from the album in January 2007. It peaked at number 1 in Denmark and at 24 in the Netherlands. In the United Kingdom, it was released as the album's third single in May 2008 and peaked at number 16.

"Fantastic 6" was released as the third single from the album, released promotionally in Denmark in April 2007 followed by a commercial release in the United Kingdom and the rest of Europe in November 2007. In the United Kingdom, it was the first single from the album, released as a limited-edition 10-inch vinyl record.

The album's fourth single, "Boyfriend", reached number 11 in Denmark, number 15 in the UK, number 18 in the Netherlands and number 49 in Ireland.

"Go-Go" was released the fifth single from the album. It was only released in Denmark, where it peaked at number fourteen. The album's sixth and final single, "What Is Happening", was not released in Denmark, but was released in the UK and other European countries. It peaked at number 110 in the UK, becoming their lowest-charting single there.

== Critical reception ==
Professional ratings
Aggregate scores
Source	Rating
Metacritic	72/100
Review scores
Source	Rating
AllMusic	(Alphabeat)
AllMusic	(This Is Alphabeat)
Digital Spy	4/5 stars
DIY	5/10
Drowned in Sound	6/10
The Guardian	4/5 stars
The Observer	5/5 stars
Pitchfork	5.5/10
STV	4/5 stars
Q	3/5 stars

Alphabeat received generally positive reviews from music critics. At Metacritic, which assigns a normalised rating out of 100 to reviews from mainstream publications, the album received an average score of 72, based on seven reviews.

== Track listing ==
All tracks written by Alphabeat, except where noted.

Alphabeat – Danish edition
No.	Title	Producer(s)	Length
1.	"10.000 Nights of Thunder"	Rune Westberg	4:23
2.	"Fascination"	Westberg	3:03
3.	"Into the Jungle"	Westberg	3:52
4.	"What Is Happening?"	Westberg	4:23
5.	"Rubber Boots/Mackintosh"	Westberg	6:13
6.	"Boyfriend"	Westberg	3:37
7.	"Ocean Blue"	Westberg	2:56
8.	"Fantastic 6"	Westberg	3:27
9.	"The Hours"	Westberg	3:09
10.	"Nothing but My Baby"	Westberg	4:26
Total length:			39:29

This Is Alphabeat – International edition
No.	Title	Producer(s)	Length
1.	"Fantastic Six"	Westberg	3:36
2.	"Fascination"	Westberg	3:01
3.	"10,000 Nights"	Westberg	4:24
4.	"Boyfriend"	Mike Spencer	3:12
5.	"What Is Happening"	Westberg; Spencer^{[a]}	3:56
6.	"Go-Go"	Spencer	3:03
7.	"Touch Me Touching You"	Spencer; Alphabeat	4:02
8.	"Rubber Boots"	Spencer; Alphabeat	4:59
9.	"Public Image" (writers: Keith Levene, Jah Wobble, Jim Walker, John Lydon)	Spencer; Alphabeat	2:49
10.	"Nothing but My Baby"	Westberg; Spencer^{[a]}; Alphabeat^{[a]}	3:13
Total length:			36:15

This Is Alphabeat – 10th Anniversary Edition
No.	Title	Producer(s)	Length
1.	"Fantastic Six"	Westberg	3:36
2.	"Fascination"	Westberg	3:01
3.	"10,000 Nights"	Westberg	4:24
4.	"Boyfriend"	Mike Spencer	3:12
5.	"What Is Happening"	Westberg; Spencer^{[a]}	3:56
6.	"Go-Go"	Spencer	3:03
7.	"Touch Me Touching You"	Spencer; Alphabeat	4:02
8.	"Rubber Boots"	Spencer; Alphabeat	4:59
9.	"Public Image" (writers: Keith Levene, Jah Wobble, Jim Walker, John Lydon)	Spencer; Alphabeat	2:49
10.	"Nothing But My Baby (Original Version)"	Westberg	4:26
11.	"Into the Jungle"	Westberg	3:52
12.	"Ocean Blue"	Westberg	2:56
Total length:			43:05

iTunes Store bonus tracks
No.	Title	Length
11.	"10,000 Nights" (alternate version)	3:32
12.	"Fascination" (Alphabeat vs. Frankmusik)	4:27
13.	"Fascination" (Bimbo Jones Remix)	2:59
Total length:		47:13

Japanese edition bonus tracks
No.	Title	Length
11.	"Into the Jungle"	3:52
12.	"Ocean Blue"	2:56
13.	"Fascination" (Bimbo Jones Remix Edit)	2:59
14.	"Fascination" (Linus Loves Dub Mix)	5:07
Total length:		51:09

Special edition bonus CD
No.	Title	Producer(s)	Length
1.	"Boyfriend" (Danish version)	Westberg	3:37
2.	"Into the Jungle" (Danish version)	Westberg	3:52
3.	"A Message" (B-side)	Alphabeat	4:11
4.	"Fascination" (live at Vega, Copenhagen)		3:29
5.	"Go-Go" (live at Vega, Copenhagen)		3:26
6.	"Boyfriend" (Napster live session)		2:49
7.	"Fascination" (Bimbo Jones Remix)	Westberg; Bimbo Jones^{[a]}^{[b]}	2:59
8.	"Fantastic Six" (Radioclit Remix)	Westberg; Radioclit^{[b]}	5:23
9.	"10,000 Nights" (Frankmusik Remix)	Westberg; Frankmusik^{[b]}	4:20
10.	"Fascination" (The Count & Sinden Remix)	Westberg; Joshua Harvey^{[a]}^{[b]}; Graeme Sinden^{[a]}^{[b]}	5:13
11.	"Fantastic Six" (Muzzle Flash Remix)	Westberg; Muzzle Flash^{[b]}	6:35
12.	"10,000 Nights" (Brodinski and Yuksek Remix)	Yuksek; Brodinski^{[c]}	4:05

Notes

- ^{^a} signifies an additional producer
- ^{^b} signifies a remixer
- ^{^c} signifies a main producer and remixer

== Personnel ==
=== Alphabeat ===
- Anders B – guitar
- Stine Bramsen – vocals
- Troels Hansen – drums
- Rasmus Nielsen – keyboards
- Anders Reinholdt – bass
- Anders SG – vocals

=== Additional personnel ===
Alphabeat

- Ketil Duckert – horns, trumpet (tracks 3, 8)
- Jan Eliasson – mastering
- Morten Jerichau – photography
- Mads Mathias – saxophone (track 2)
- Jakob Sørensen – product management
- Spild af Tid ApS – artwork
- Rune Westberg – mixing, recording, production (all tracks); recorder (track 6); slide guitar (track 10)

This Is Alphabeat

- Alphabeat – production (tracks 7–9); additional production (track 10)
- Laurence Aldridge – recording assistance (tracks 4–6, 8, 10)
- Christopher Allan – cello (track 5)
- Nell Catchpole – violin (track 5)
- Alex Cowper – design
- John Davis – mastering
- Alison Dodds – violin (track 5)
- Ketil Duckert – horns, trumpet (track 1)
- Richard Edgeler – mixing assistance (tracks 2–5)
- Finn Eiles – recording (tracks 4, 6, 8, 10); additional recording (track 5)
- Eine – letter art
- Pete Hofmann – additional recording (track 9)
- Mads Mathias – saxophone (track 2)
- Rachel Robson – viola (track 5)
- Mike Spencer – production (tracks 4, 6, 7–9); additional production (tracks 5, 10); mixing (tracks 6–10)
- Magnus Unnar – photography
- Rune Westberg – mixing (track 1); production, recording (tracks 1–3, 5, 10); slide guitar (track 10)
- Jeremy Wheatley – mixing (tracks 2–5)

== Charts ==
=== Weekly charts ===
Weekly chart performance for Alphabeat
Chart (2007)	Peak position
Danish Albums (Hitlisten)	2

Weekly chart performance for This Is Alphabeat
Chart (2008)	Peak position
Belgian Albums (Ultratop Flanders)	63
Danish Albums (Hitlisten)	5
Dutch Albums (Album Top 100)	28
Irish Albums (IRMA)	54
Scottish Albums (Official Charts)	9
UK Albums (Official Charts)	10

=== Year-end charts ===
Year-end chart performance for Alphabeat
Chart (2007)	Position
Danish Albums (Hitlisten)	23

Year-end chart performance for This Is Alphabeat
Chart (2008)	Position
Danish Albums (Hitlisten)	54
UK Albums (OCC)	118

== Certifications ==
Certifications for Alphabeat
Region	Certification	Certified units/sales
Denmark (IFPI Danmark)	Platinum	30,000^{^}
United Kingdom (BPI)	Gold	100,000^{^}
^{^} Shipments figures based on certification alone.

== Release history ==
Release history and formats for Alphabeat
Region	Date	Label	Edition	Ref.
Denmark	5 March 2007	Copenhagen	Alphabeat	
Germany	30 May 2008	EMI	This Is Alphabeat	
Denmark	2 June 2008	Copenhagen	This Is Alphabeat	
United Kingdom	2 June 2008	Charisma	This Is Alphabeat	
Japan	16 July 2008	EMI	This Is Alphabeat	
Denmark	1 June 2018	Copenhagen / Universal	This is Alphabeat – 10th Anniversary Edition	
