= Dragostea din tei =

2003 single by O-Zone

- One of multiple covers used for the song

Single by O-Zone

from the album DiscO-Zone
- Language: Romanian
- Released: c. June 2003 (Note: Although the exact release date of "Dragostea din tei" is unclear, the song opened on the Romanian Top 100 chart in June 2003, indicating that it had received radio airplay by that time.)
- Recorded: April 2003
- Studio: MOF Records studio (Bucharest, Romania)
- Genre: Dance-pop; Eurodance; Eurodisco; Europop; synth-pop
- Length: 3:33
- Label: Media Services
- Songwriter: Dan Balan
- Producer: Bogdan Popoiag

O-Zone singles chronology
"Despre tine" (2002)	"Dragostea din tei" (2003)	"De de plâng chitarele" (2004)

Music video
- "Dragostea din tei" on YouTube

"Dragostea din tei" (Note: Also known as "Dragostea din teï", "Mai Ai Hee (Dragostea din tei)", "Ma Ya Hi (Dragostea din tei)", "恋のマイアヒ" ("Koi no maiahi"; "Maiahi of Love"), and as the "Numa Numa Song".) (pronounced [ˈdraɡoste̯a din ˈtej]; Romanian: "The Love from the Linden Tree") is a song recorded by Moldovan group O-Zone, released in Romania around June 2003 by Media Services as the lead single from their third studio album DiscO-Zone (2003). It was written by the band's founder Dan Balan and produced by Bogdan Popoiag. A 1980s-inspired track blending dance-pop, Eurodance, Eurodisco, Europop and synth-pop, "Dragostea din tei" is performed in Romanian. The lyrics reference sexual encounters beneath trees, although critics have interpreted them as nonsensical or depicting a phone conversation with a romantic interest. The song has elements considered humorous and a yodeling motif.

Critics described the song's melody and rhythm as catchy and simple, noting that they were accessible even to non-Romanian-speaking audiences. At the 2005 Echo Music Prize ceremony in Germany, "Dragostea din tei" was awarded Single of the Year. Commercially, the song first topped the Romanian Top 100 in late 2003 before attaining international success throughout 2004 and 2005, reaching number one in Austria, Wallonia, Denmark, France, Germany, Ireland, the Netherlands, Norway, Spain and Switzerland―something unprecedented for a track in Romanian. It was certified diamond by France's Syndicat national de l'édition phonographique (SNEP) and quadruple million by the Recording Industry Association of Japan (RIAJ). By October 2007, it had sold over 12 million copies worldwide.

Multiple observers have credited the song's international breakthrough to a dance cover released in December 2003 by Italy-based Romanian singer Haiducii through Universo. Her version topped the Italian singles chart in early 2004 and later reached number one in Austria and Sweden. Haiducii's rendition competed with O-Zone's original in several markets, sometimes preceding or even outperforming it on regional charts. A controversy emerged when Balan claimed the cover had been released without his authorization. The original "Dragostea din tei" gained further visibility through a Japanese animated video that circulated online, which later inspired American amateur vlogger Gary Brolsma to use the song in his viral video Numa Numa Dance in December 2004. In the clip, Brolsma cheerfully lip-synchs and dances to "Dragostea din tei" while seated at his computer. The video became one of the most-watched Internet clips of all time and emerged as an early predecessor to the modern Internet meme.

The music video for "Dragostea din tei", directed by Dmitri Voloshin, features the members of O-Zone in the cockpit of an airplane, performing the song both inside the aircraft and atop its wings. To promote the single, the group embarked on live performances across Europe, Russia, and Japan. In the United States, Balan appeared on Today to perform "Ma Ya Hi", (Note: Also referred to as "Words of Love", "Dragostea din tei (Ma Ya Hi)", and the "Mai Ai Hee Song".) an English-language version of the song released exclusively in that market in collaboration with American musician Lucas Prata. Over the years, "Dragostea din tei" has been referenced in numerous other works, achieving varied levels of commercial success. In 2008, American rapper T.I. and Barbadian singer Rihanna sampled and interpolated it in their song "Live Your Life", which reached number one in the United States. "Dragostea din tei" was later also interpolated in French DJ David Guetta and American band OneRepublic's successful 2024 single "I Don't Wanna Wait". Additionally, it has been featured in several films, including Chicken Little (2005) and Happy Feet Two (2011).

== Background ==
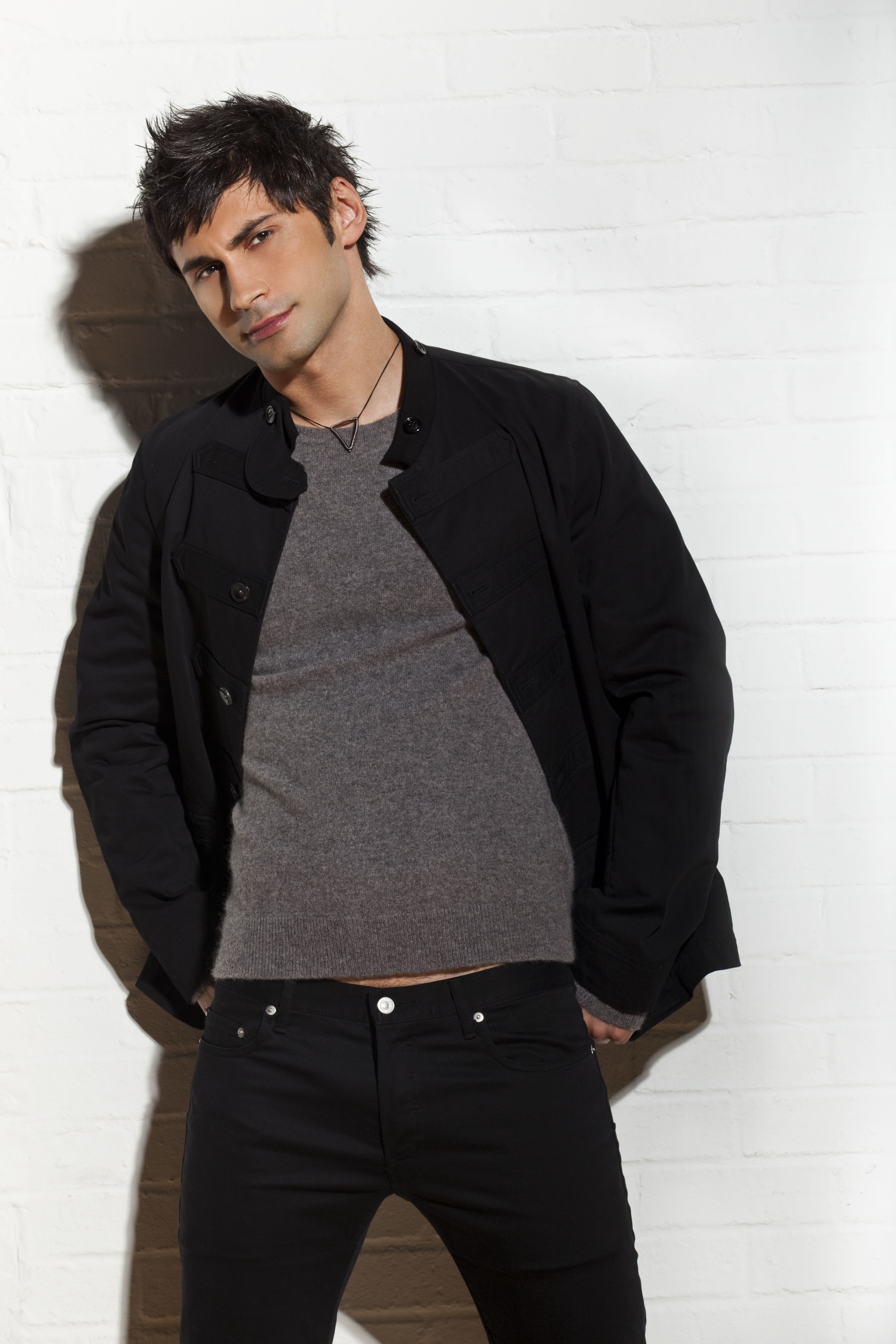
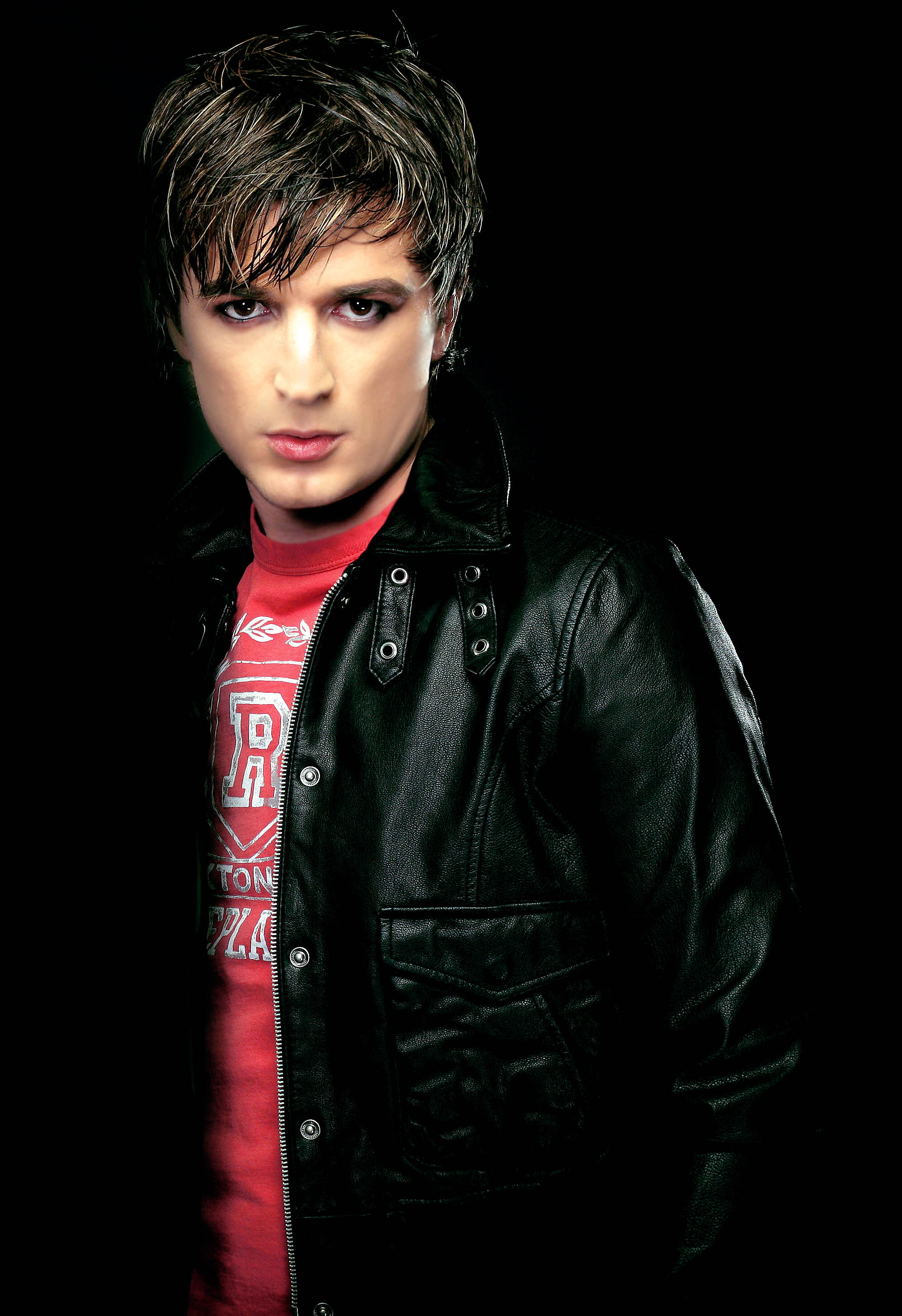
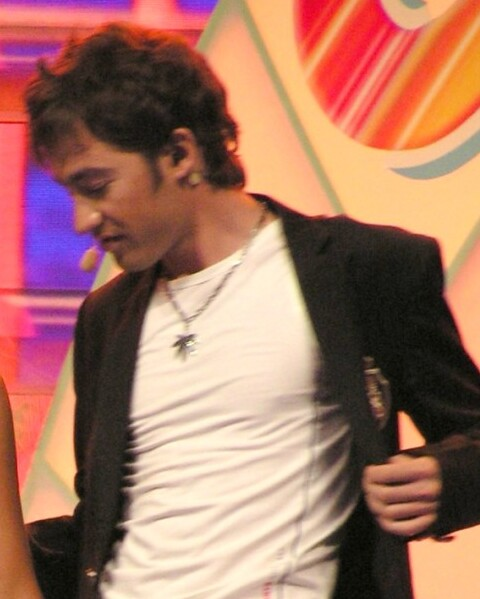
From left to right: O-Zone members Dan Balan, Radu Sîrbu (both pictured in 2009) and Arsenie Todiraș (pictured in 2006). Internal tensions within the band reportedly intensified following the recording of their third studio album, DiscO-Zone, in 2003—which included "Dragostea din tei"—leading to an initial agreement between the members to disband upon the completion of the album's promotional cycle.

O-Zone was a Moldovan Eurodance group formed in 1999 by Dan Balan. The original lineup included Balan and Petru Jelihovschi, both of whom had previously performed in the gothic and doom metal band Inferialis during the 1990s. Seeking a more viable sound, the duo released O-Zone's debut studio album Dar, unde ești... later in 1999; the album found success in Moldova, and Jelihovschi departed the project to pursue a career in television.

In 2001, Balan cast two new members—Radu Sîrbu and Arsenie Todiraș—and, in 2002, relocated the group to neighbouring Romania in search of a larger music market. The move was facilitated by the absence of a language barrier, as Romanian is spoken in both countries. Moldova had been part of Romania until World War II, and its population remains Romanian to a significant extent, fostering a sense of unity between the two countries. O-Zone achieved their first major success in Romania with the single "Despre tine", which reached number one on the Romanian Top 100 in February 2003.

Throughout 2003, O-Zone recorded their third studio album, DiscO-Zone (2003), at MOF Records studio in Bucharest. Recording sessions held in April, with assistance from Bogdan Popoiag, yielded the follow-up single "Dragostea din tei", which was released in Romania later that year. These were the group's final recordings, as internal tensions had begun to escalate―both among the members and with their management. Disputes centered on the authorship and ownership of the O-Zone brand, as well as the group's future direction. Despite these conflicts, Balan stated that the band agreed to delay their disbandment until the promotional cycle for DiscO-Zone was completed and contractual obligations to their record label fulfilled.

Media outlets later reported that O-Zone had initially planned to disband as early as December 2003 to pursue solo careers. Solo renditions of "Dragostea din tei" were allegedly recorded during this period, anticipating the group's separation. However, the Italian commercial success of a cover released by Romanian singer Haiducii around that time led their label to postpone those plans. O-Zone's official disbandment was eventually announced in January 2005, at a time when the group remained at the height of their international popularity.

== Writing and authorship dispute ==
"Dragostea din tei" was written and composed by Balan, while Popoiag produced and mastered it. Balan worked on the song for two months, refining the refrain. The track was intended to be titled "Luna mai" (Romanian: "The Month of May"), which is the origin of the "Ma-ia-hii, Ma-ia-huu, Ma-ia-hoo, Ma-ia-haha" (Note: The yodelling sequence has been transcribed in various ways by different sources, including as "Maya hee, maya hoo, maya ha, maya ha-ha".) sequence featured throughout the song. Balan also said that he had not encountered the phrase "Dragostea din tei" prior to composing the track.

In July 2004, Popoiag filed a lawsuit against Balan and Media Services—the label that had signed O-Zone—at the Bucharest Court, claiming that he had not been credited for his role as a co-composer of "Dragostea din tei". In response, Balan filed a countersuit for defamation. The label had entered into a contractual agreement with MOF Records studio, where Popoiag was employed at the time. The contract stipulated that a song's producer could not be granted songwriting credits. Popi questioned the timing of Popoiag's legal action, noting that he had waited several months after the song's release before initiating the lawsuit. During the trial, Todiraș and Sîrbu testified in Balan's defence. The court ruled in Balan's favour in February 2005, ordering Popoiag to pay 60 million ROL (Note: In July 2005, the Romanian leu (ROL) was replaced by the revalued leu (RON). For context, at the time Balan received the monetary award in February 2005, the average gross monthly salary in Romania for 2004 stood at approximately 8.2 million ROL.) after he failed to provide sufficient evidence for his claims. Following the verdict, Balan announced that he would donate the awarded sum to the winner of a songwriting competition.

== Release ==
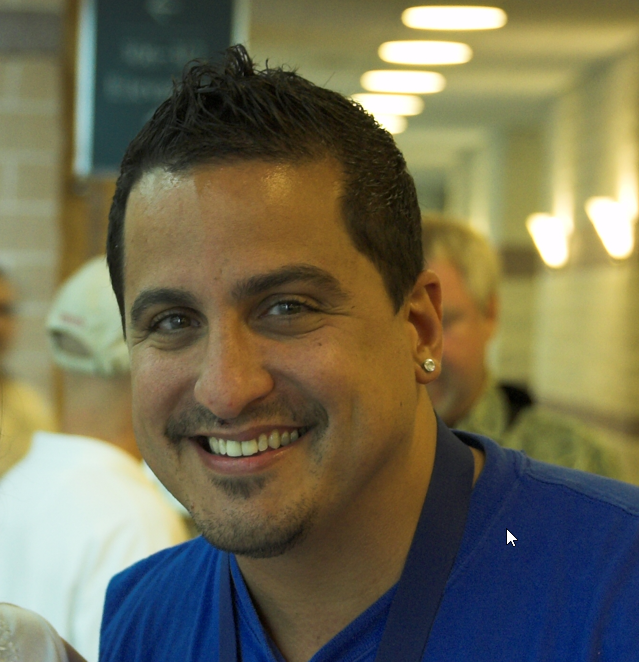
An English language-version of the song, titled "Ma Ya Hi", was released in the United States in 2004 and features American musician Lucas Prata (pictured in 2006).

"Dragostea din tei" was first released as the lead single from O-Zone's album DiscO-Zone in Romania by local label Media Services. While the precise release date remains unclear, the track debuted on the Romanian Top 100 chart in June 2003, suggesting that it had received radio airplay by that time. Mentions of the song in Romanian media date back to at least July 2003, and its copyright was officially registered in the region in August of that year. A Romanian CD release followed in 2003 through Cat Music, which also included the music videos for the group's earlier singles "Numai tu" and "Despre tine".

Following its release in Romania, "Dragostea din tei" was licensed to the Italian label Time Records on the 29th of January 2004 as part of a deal signed by Media Services valued at nearly €100,000. This agreement enabled Time Records―who had become interested in O-Zone through the popularity of Haiducii's cover in Italy―to authorize a number of other European labels to distribute the track. Another label considered for the same distribution role was Hit Mania, which, according to Tudor Horațiu of Jurnalul Național, was a British imprint of Universo, the label managing Haiducii. Had a contract been signed, Hit Mania allegedly planned to block the release of O-Zone's original version in the Italian market.

Over the course of 2004, the song received physical releases in several countries, including France, Germany, Italy, the Netherlands, Spain, and the United Kingdom. According to Todiraș, however, international radio stations had begun playing the track prior to its official release. "Dragostea din tei" was also included as the B-side to select international editions of the single "Despre tine", which was reissued in 2004. On 22 June 2004, "Dragostea din tei" was made available for digital download in the United States by Media Services under the title "Mai Ai Hee (Dragostea din tei)". In 2005, a CD of the track was issued in Japan by Avex Trax under the localized title "恋のマイアヒ" ("Koi no maiahi"; "Maiahi of Love").

=== English-language version ===
"Ma Ya Hi", an English-language adaptation of the song performed by Balan and American musician Lucas Prata, was first included on American DJ Denny Tsettos' compilation album Club Anthems, Vol. 1, released on 7 September 2004 by Ultra Records. Also in 2004, the label issued two 12-inch vinyl editions of the song in the United States. One of these releases further included the Valentin Remix (Note: Also referred to as "Dragostea din tei (Ma Ya Hi)", and "The Ma Ya Hi Song".) of "Ma Ya Hi". The English version was recorded in Milan, Italy, and co-written by Balan and Prata. Popoiag claims to also have worked on the song with Balan. Media reports at the time suggested that the project may have led to internal friction within the band since it only featured Balan from O-Zone. In a 2013 interview, Balan recalled feeling vilified by the press, stating he had been portrayed as the one responsible for breaking up O-Zone in order to pursue a solo career. The Valentin Remix of "Ma Ya Hi" later appeared on the North American edition of DiscO-Zone and was serviced to radio stations there in early 2005. It was also included on Prata's studio album Let's Get It On (2006).

== Composition and lyrics ==
"Dragostea din tei"
A 23-second sample of "Dragostea din tei", showcasing its yodeling sequence, and the use of the words "nu mă, nu mă iei" (Romanian: "won't, won't take me") in the refrain, which have led the track to also be known as the "Numa Numa Song".

"Dragostea din tei" is a 1980s-inspired dance-pop, Eurodance, Eurodisco, Europop, and synth-pop track, with its use of synthesized bass and what Rolling Stone Australia described as "robotic stop-start rhythms". Billboard staff have categorized "Dragostea din tei" as a novelty song, while Der Spiegel's Ulf Lippitz described it as "trash-pop" and Balan himself as "funny pop". It is composed in the key of A minor, maintaining a tempo of 130 beats per minute and follows a chord progression of F-C-G-Am.

"Dragostea din tei" is sung in Romanian, and its title has been translated as "The Love from the Linden Tree". The "tei" (Romanian: "linden tree") is a motif frequently employed in Romanian literature, possessing elements of romanticism and summertime. Though, the pronunciation of the song's title is ambiguous, leading select listeners to mishear it as "Dragostea dintâi" (Romanian: "First love"). Some publications have suggested that it may convey the notion of "false love" or allude to a district in Bucharest.

While Balan has claimed that the lyrics refer to sexual encounters beneath trees, various critics and publications have interpreted them as nonsensical. Douglas Wolk of The Believer described the lyrics as "nonspecific", elaborating that they appear to capture one half of a phone conversation with a romantic partner. A Radio Eska editor added that the lyrical subject seems to seek the affection of their love interest, though the unilateral nature of the dialogue leaves it ambiguous whether those efforts succeed. The act of "beeping"―a term often referring to missed calls as a form of communication―is also mentioned throughout the lyrics, which Rivista Studio's Pietro Minto described as emblematic of adolescent life in the early 2000s. The lyrics also see O-Zone referring to themselves as hajduks―a term for Balkan outlaws—and invoking the name of Pablo Picasso. In the English version, "hajduk" is rendered as "duke", while the Picasso reference is expanded with lines such as: "I will paint my words of love/ With your name on every wall."

The sequence "Ma-ia-hii, Ma-ia-huu, Ma-ia-hoo, Ma-ia-haha" is yodelled at the beginning and during the track. Lippitz likened Balan's vocal delivery in the song to traditional Romanian folk singing, considering this an element through which the track connected folkloristic with international sounds. In the refrain, the line "nu mă, nu mă iei" (Romanian: "you won't, you won't take me") is repeated as the lyrical subject details their romantic interest wanting to leave them; the former line has also been known as "numa numa yay" and the track as the "Numa Numa Song". In the English-language version, this sequence is replaced by "Oo-aa-oo-aa-ay", a change that Wolk criticized for lacking the "baby-talk singability" of the original.

== Critical reception and analysis ==
Music critics have described "Dragostea din tei" as catchy and straightforward. The Believer's Wolk wrote that "[t]here's scarcely a second without some extraordinary hook", and Hugh Morris of The Calvert Journal described them as "bright" and as the song's defining strength, observing "not one but two choruses" in the "nu mă, nu mă iei" and yodelled sequences. While The Guardian's Alexis Petridis remarked that the track "wobbles unsteadily along the line that separates catchy from infuriating", Lauren Murphy of Entertainment.ie conceded its infectious quality, but deemed it "terrible". laut.de's Alexander Cordas described "Dragostea din tei" as "unpretentious" and characterized it as "simple light music". Dana Dorian of Jurnalul Național echoed this sentiment, calling the composition "puerile and very predictable", suggesting it was designed to appeal to a wide, multilingual audience. She further critiqued the vocal performance as unpolished and lacking technical skill, but concluded that a more sophisticated delivery was unnecessary for the track.

The song's lyrics also drew critical attention for their perceived nonsensical nature. While Libertatea's Petre Dobrescu criticized this aspect, comparing it to the band's other work, Harald Peters of Die Tageszeitung argued that such lyrical absurdity linked "Dragostea din tei" to other international songs like "The Ketchup Song (Aserejé)" (2002) by Spanish group Las Ketchup. Other commentators suggested that the Romanian lyrics posed no barrier to success, emphasizing that the song's melody and rhythm had a universal appeal that transcended language. Wolk summarized the track's accessibility by describing its chorus as "as big as an abandoned government building", one that "huge legions of drunk people [could] sing easily [to]".

Some critics positioned "Dragostea din tei" within a broader trend of music from Eastern Bloc countries gaining popularity across Europe at that time. Artists such as Russian duo t.A.T.u. and Ukrainian singer Ruslana were cited as part of this cultural wave. Lippitz of Der Spiegel attributed this phenomenon in part to the 2004 enlargement of the European Union, which facilitated increased exposure to Western media and trends in Eastern Europe. Others compared the song to works by artists like Austrian singer DJ Ötzi, Swiss musician DJ BoBo's "Chihuahua" (2003), and Finnish band Ultra Bra's "Sinä lähdit pois" (1997).

=== Accolades ===
Awards and nominations received by "Dragostea din tei"
Ceremony	Year	Award	Result	Notes	Ref.
MTV Romania Music Awards	2004	Best Single	Nominated		
Echo Music Prize	2005	Single of the Year	Won	O-Zone attended the awards ceremony in Berlin on 2 April 2005 to accept the prize, despite having disbanded earlier that year.	
Russian Music Industry Awards	2005	Foreign Radio Hit	Nominated		
Russian Music Industry Awards	2005	Ringtone of the Year	Nominated		

== Commercial performance ==
"Dragostea din tei" was a commercial success. As of October 2007, it had sold over 12 million copies worldwide. Among several other achievements, it became the third-most successful single of the 2000s in Germany, and at one point, it was also the best-selling digital single in Japan with four million units sold, before being surpassed by Japanese-American singer Hikaru Utada "Flavor of Life" in 2007. In a 2004 interview on Observator, Balan attributed the international success of "Dragostea din tei" to its cheerful nature, which he saw as a stark contrast to the melancholic R&B tracks that dominated music at the time.

=== Initial 2003 success in Romania and international recognition in 2004 ===
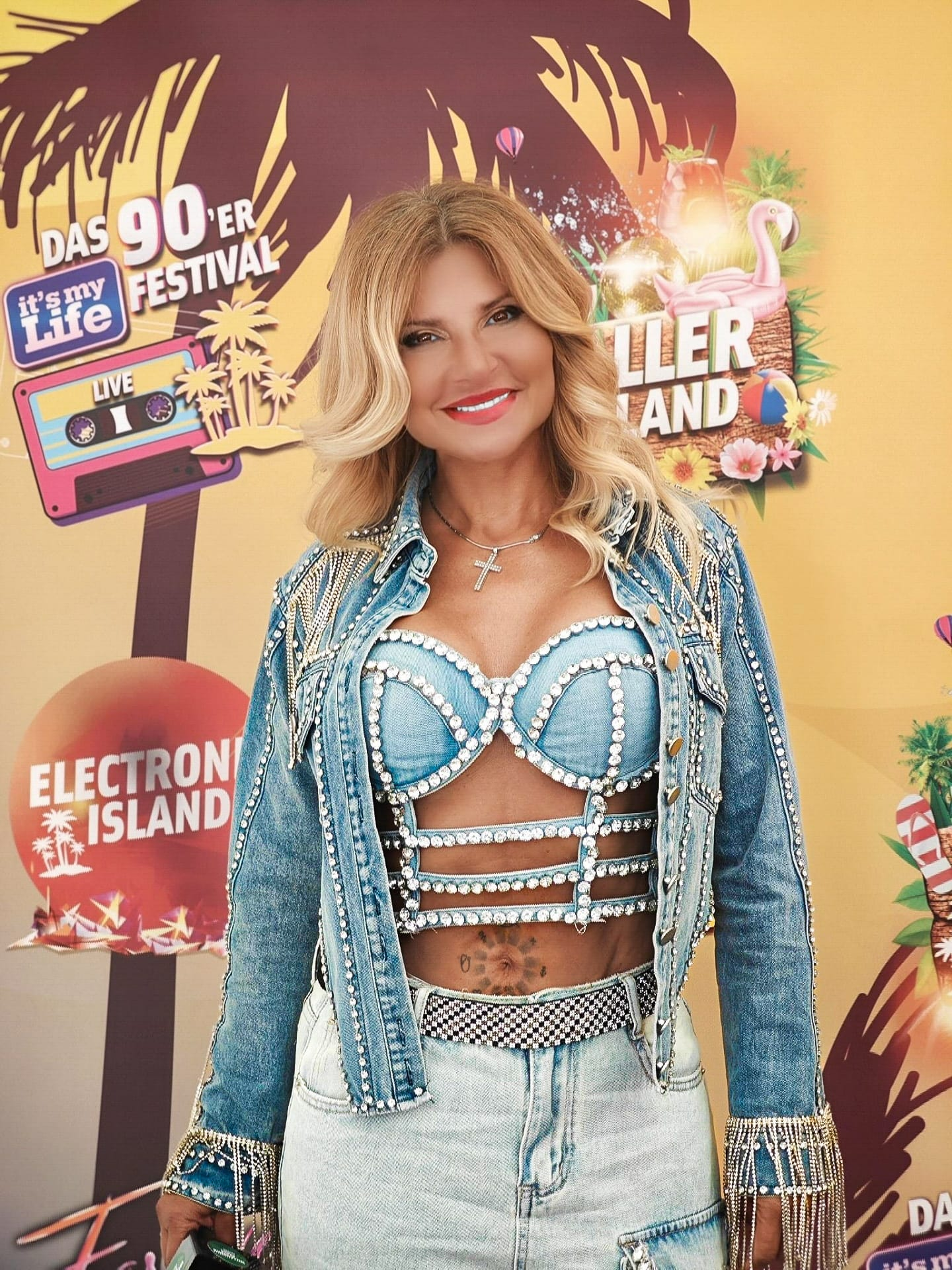
At one point, five versions of the song were present in the French top 20, including a cover by Romanian singer Haiducii (pictured in 2025).

The song first achieved commercial success in Romania. It debuted at number 87 on the Romanian Top 100 in June 2003, eventually reaching number one and holding that position for three consecutive weeks in September 2003. It was the group's second Romanian chart-topper following "Despre tine" earlier that year. By April 2004, "Dragostea din tei" had sold over 250,000 copies in Romania.

The song began gaining traction internationally in early 2004. In March, it reached number 17 on the Italian singles chart, and the following month debuted at number one in Spain―the first market outside Romania to provide radio support. It returned to the top position in Spain twice more during May and June 2004. In April, "Dragostea din tei" topped the French singles chart and maintained the number-one position for 15 consecutive weeks. At one point, five different versions of the song appeared in France's top 20: O-Zone's original, Haiducii's cover, and three parodies―"Ma cé ki? Massimo" by Italian media figure Massimo Gargia, "Le poulailler" by French radio programme Le 6–9, and "Argent-Argent" by French television host Cauet and Mopral. "Dragostea din tei" was eventually certified diamond by the Syndicat national de l'édition phonographique (SNEP).

By June 2004, the song had shipped approximately 500,000 copies across Europe. From June to August, it continued to impact charts in multiple territories. It reached number one in all DACH countries, maintaining that position for 14 weeks in Germany and Switzerland, and for 13 weeks in Austria. In Germany, it received a double platinum certification from Bundesverband Musikindustrie (BVMI). The song also topped the Dutch Single Top 100, and achieved success in the Nordic countries, reaching number one in Norway and Denmark, number two in Finland, and number three in Sweden.

On Billboard's European Hot 100 Singles chart, "Dragostea din tei" spent 12 weeks at number one, at one point being followed by Haiducii's version at number two and "Le poulailler" at number 18. The song also reached number one in Ireland, number two in Scotland, and number three in the United Kingdom. A remixed version titled "Unu' in the Dub Mix" peaked at number nine on the radio airplay chart in the Commonwealth of Independent States (CIS). Around September 2004, "Dragostea din tei" appeared on multiple charts monitoring the most played tracks by DJs across Canada, including in the region of Quebec. The song topped the 2004 year-end charts in Austria, France, Germany, Netherlands and Switzerland, and ranked number one on the year-end list of the European Hot 100 Singles chart.

=== Continued success in the United States and Japan in 2005 ===
In the United States, the Valentin Remix of the Lucas Prata version of the song peaked at number 14 on Billboard's Dance Airplay chart at the end of August 2004, however its broader crossover came in March 2005, when it reached number 16 on the Bubbling Under Hot 100, number 69 on the Digital Songs chart, and number 72 on the Pop 100. By that time, the song had sold over 32,000 digital downloads, according to Nielsen SoundScan, and it was later certified gold by the Recording Industry Association of America (RIAA).

In his book The Click Moment: Seizing Opportunity in an Unpredictable World, author Frans Johansson remarked that the track received minimal radio support in the United States due to its introduction to the North American market at a time when techno-driven club music was declining in popularity, with radio dominated by R&B and hip-hop. A Billboard article from March 2005 cited radio station WKTU as an example of local broadcasters reluctant to play the track, viewing it as "too novelty" for mainstream audiences, especially in the wake of the viral Numa Numa Dance video. In Japan, the original version of "Dragostea din tei" peaked at number 72 on the Oricon Singles Chart in June 2005. The song was certified quadruple million, platinum, and gold by the Recording Industry Association of Japan (RIAJ) across various formats. As of August 2006, "Dragostea din tei" was reported to be Japan's best-selling ringtone, with sales exceeding four million units.

== Virality ==
=== On the Japanese Internet ===
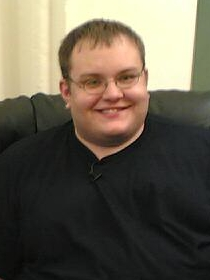
Gary Brolsma (left; pictured in 2006), an American vlogger, used "Dragostea din tei" in his viral video Numa Numa Dance. He had come across the song through a Japanese clip that paired it with animations of what resembles the cat figure Monā (right).

In Japan, an anonymous user known as Ikari created an animated video using "Dragostea din tei", featuring a character resembling Monā, a Shift_JIS art cat illustrated by users of the Japanese textboard 2channel. The video misinterprets the Romanian lyrics as English or Japanese phrases, accompanied by corresponding visuals. For instance, "salut" (Romanian: "hello") is paired with a monkey (Japanese: "saru"), "fericirea" (Romanian: "happiness") is misheard as "panchira" (Japanese: "looking up at a skirt"), and "nu mă, nu mă iei" becomes "noma, noma, yay" (Japanese: "drink, drink, yay"). The clip gained popularity online and inspired a wave of similar videos from users around the world. In response to its success, O-Zone's Japanese label Avex Trax released merchandise based on the video's central figure, branding it as the "Noma neko" (Japanese: "Noma cat").

=== Numa Numa Dance ===
Discovering the song through Ikari's video, American amateur vlogger Gary Brolsma created a lip-sync video to "Dragostea din tei" titled Numa Numa Dance, which he uploaded to the website Newgrounds on 6 December 2004. The video shows Brolsma seated at his computer, singing and dancing along to the song. Wren Graves of Consequence characterized Brolsma's performance as marked by "sly humor" and "full commitment". He noticed the use of expressive gestures such as a "perfectly timed raised eyebrow" and fist pumps thrown overhead as elements contributing to the video's animated quality.

The video went viral, amassing over 700 million views by November 2006, giving Brolsma mainstream media coverage and sparking numerous parodies and remakes. In their essay Memes as genre: A structurational analysis of the memescape, scholars Bradley E. Wiggins and G. Bret Bowers identified Numa Numa Dance as a prototype of user-generated content and modern Internet memes, before the latter were used in Internet culture.

Numa Numa Dance remains one of the most-viewed Internet videos of all time. The Believer's Wolk referred to the phenomenon as "numanumamania", and wrote that Brolsma's video functioned as more effective promotion for "Dragostea din tei" than any marketing efforts a record label could have financed. Similarly, Michael Paoletta, writing for Billboard, credited Numa Numa Dance in increasing the song's visibility in the United States.

== Promotion ==
=== Marketing ===
Distinct marketing strategies were developed to promote "Dragostea din tei" across various regions, with Time Records' then–international manager Monica Marcangeli highlighting Balan's involvement in this process during a 2013 interview. In France, the track was aided by an advertising campaign across television and radio. A similar promotional effort took place in Germany, where the song was publicized during halftime segments at football matches and through a collaboration with travel agencies. The German CD single was accompanied by a promotional contest in which purchasers could win a German–Romanian dictionary, enabling them to translate and understand the song's lyrics. Johannson attributed the modest performance of "Dragostea din tei" in the United States to the limited promotional capabilities of Ultra Records, stating that the label lacked the necessary expertise and resources to promote it effectively. Low sales and minimal radio support led the label to cancel the track's promotional campaign.

=== Music video ===
An music video for "Dragostea din tei", directed and animated by Dmitri Voloshin, was released in 2003. The low-budget clip includes scenes filmed on a partially constructed aircraft after the crew was last-minute denied permission to shoot on an operational plane at an airport. Footage was also shot at Lake Komsomolskoye in Russia. As "Dragostea din tei" had been written at the time, the band members did not yet memorize all of its lyrics and read them from a sheet of paper during filming. The music video also features scenes of the group performing what Balan described in an interview as a traditional Moldovan dance, in which the members stand side by side with their arms linked over each other's shoulders, jumping from one foot to the other in unison.

The video opens with Todiraș lounging on a couch as elements of "Despre tine" play in the background. This is followed by computer-generated shots of a city—originally featured in the "Numai tu" music video—and a magazine promoting O-Zone's comeback, paired with excerpts from the video for "Despre tine". The narrative then shifts to the group members running out of a building toward an aircraft. Upon boarding and entering the cockpit, they take off as "Dragostea din tei" begins. The trio are shown dancing both inside the aircraft and atop its wings mid-flight, as well as recording the song in a studio. Throughout the video, they wear white pants and colored shirts—Todiraș and Balan with shirts open to the waist, accessorized with suspenders and sunglasses.

The video also features numerous computer-generated sequences of the aircraft, which includes an "ON AIR" sign and jet engines that transform into speakers. Interspersed throughout are animated cartoon stills, such as Balan depicted as a cyborg, Sîrbu in a bodybuilding competition, Balan and Todiraș in a laboratory with an alien or appearing as vampires, Batman, three men of varying ethnicities in traditional attire before a dove with an olive branch, and the Moldovan flag. The song ends with an animated shot of the group standing before a crashed and burning plane, followed by them leaving the site. The narrative then returns to the opening scene of Todiraș on the couch as the Unu' in the Dub Mix version of the song plays. Balan sits beside him sketching on his pencil board, and all three band members gather smiling to look at the drawing—revealed to be a storyboard of the music video.

In her book New Media Literacies and Participatory Popular Culture Across Borders, Bronwyn Williams likened the animation style to anime and called the visuals "inexplicable", describing the video as "eminently forgettable". Minto of Rivista Studio found the video "spectacular", though he commented that the dance scenes were out of context and the special effects appeared low quality and "botched". Fred Guilledoux of La Provence described the video as "rather well-edited", commenting on the band members' "pre-pubescent Playboy poses" and singling out the scene in which they perform atop the wing of an airplane as "legendary". The Calvert Journal's Morris referred to the video as "slightly off-the-wall", comparing its animated sequences to those in Tekken video games and viewing both them and the scenes of dancing on an airplane's wings as a nod to the clip for the Vengaboys' "We're Going to Ibiza" (1999). In Von Hora, Doina und Lăutaren, scholar Marina Cap-Bun explored possible symbolic connections between the video and the Romanian Zburător myth. In a 2017 interview, Balan stated that the video contributed to the song's emergence as a gay anthem, in part due to the group's outfits and display of affection for each other.

=== Live performances ===
O-Zone performed "Dragostea din tei" at a number of high-profile television events across multiple countries. In a 2013 retrospective interview, Balan reflected on the intense demands surrounding the song's promotional cycle, describing a sense of mounting pressure and fatigue as numerous television appearance requests arrived, driven by the track's overlapping rise in multiple international markets.

O-Zone performed "Dragostea din tei" at the MTV Romania Music Awards 2003 on 5 June 2003. In Germany, the group appeared on The Dome 30 on 21 May 2004, followed by performances on Wetten, dass..? on 3 July 2004, Bravo Super Show on 1 October 2004, and the German edition of Top of the Pops on 8 January 2005. In France, O-Zone presented the song on Hit Machine on 24 April 2004, and later performed it during the fourth season of Star Academy on 22 October 2004. The track was also featured during their appearance on the fifth season of Russia's Fabrika Zvyozd in 2004, and on Top of the Pops in both the United Kingdom and the Netherlands, aired on 25 and 31 December 2004, respectively.

In Japan, O-Zone performed "Dragostea din tei" on major music programs including Music Station and SMAPxSMAP in 2005, however, according to Todiraș, plans for a more extensive tour throughout the country were cancelled. Following the group's disbandment that same year, several international television appearance requests also had to be withdrawn, despite efforts by the label to persuade the band to fulfill them. Later in 2005, Balan appeared on the American morning show Today alongside Prata to perform the Valentin Remix of "Ma Ya Hi". Their appearance on the program, broadcast on 22 February 2005, was prompted by the viral success of Brolsma's Numa Numa Dance video. Ultra Records scrapped plans for a tour in the United States due to the modest sales and radio performance of "Ma Ya Hi", according to Johansson. Before disbanding in 2005, O-Zone gave a performance of "Dragostea din tei" at the Golden Stag Festival in Romania in September of that year. The group later reunited on select occasions to perform the song: on Europe Day on 9 May 2017 in Bucharest's University Square and Chişinău's Great National Assembly Square, and during the New Year's Eve celebration held in Constitution Square in 2019 in Bucharest.

== Legacy ==
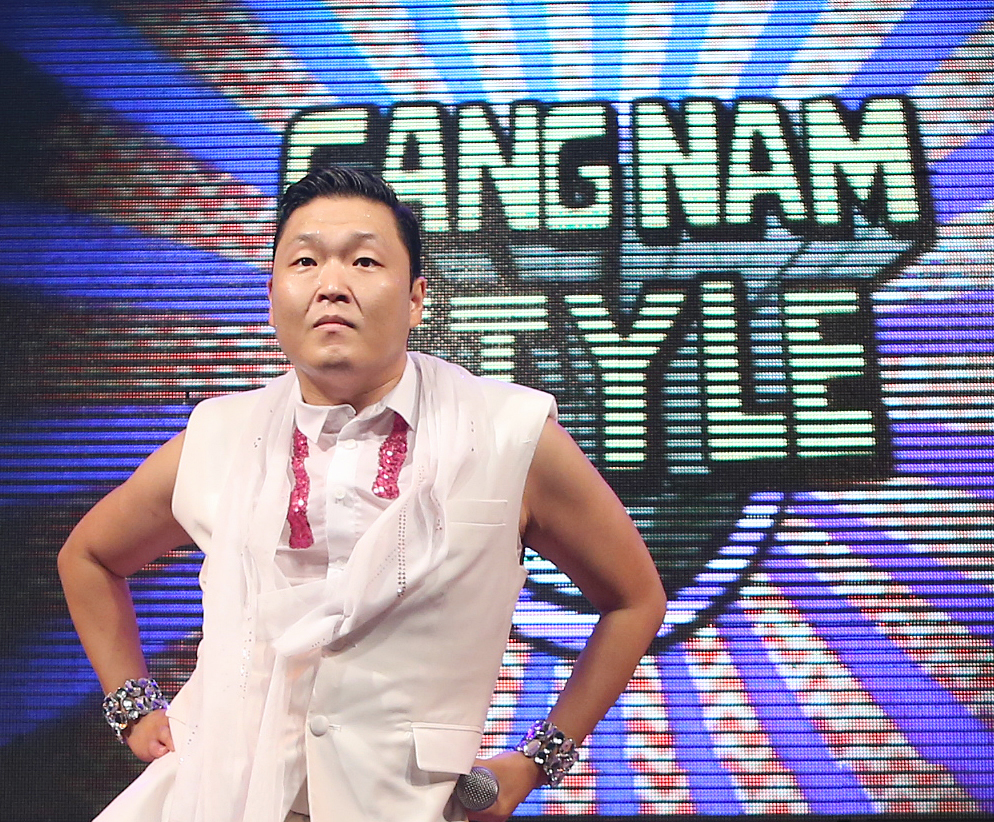
Critics have remarked the song's atypical global success despite being performed in a non-English language, with one drawing a comparison to the viral impact of the 2012 song "Gangnam Style" by South Korean rapper Psy (pictured in 2012), sung in Korean.

Critics have highlighted the cultural and historical significance of "Dragostea din tei" to Romania and Moldova. Reflecting on its sustained chart presence, Andrei Vulpescu of Curentul characterized the track's global impact—spanning over nine months—as an unparalleled milestone in the history of Romanian music. Loredana Costache of Evenimentul Zilei wrote that the song opened the door for Romanian artists to achieve international chart success. In 2015, the British Foreign, Commonwealth and Development Office ranked "Dragostea din tei" among the five songs that best represented Romania, notably being the only contemporary release on the list. Author Paul Brummell commented that its inclusion as a track of Moldovan origin underscored the prevailing perception that the ethnic Romanian community of Moldova shares a common cultural space with Romania. (Note: Some sources misattribute "Dragostea din tei" as being of Romanian origin.)

Libertatea remarked that "Dragostea din tei" had "done more for Romania's image than all politicians put together", while Balan stated in an interview that his greatest source of pride was promoting the Romanian language through the song. Commenting on its symbolic importance to Moldova, Yle's Tuukka Tuomasjukka wrote that the track's widespread popularity signified a cultural shift, ushering Moldova into the European cultural landscape in an unprecedented manner, following its period as part of the Soviet Union.

Another examined aspect of the song's legacy has been its linguistic and cross-cultural resonance. Paul Sexton of Billboard described "Dragostea din tei" as a testament to music's ability to transcend national borders, writing that it "managed to convey uninhibited joy better than any phrase in the English language probably could". Rivista Studio's Minto similarly reflected on the track's unusual linguistic breakthrough, describing its success in Western markets―despite being sung in a language rarely heard in mainstream pop―as an exceptional occurrence, comparing it to South Korean rapper Psy's viral 2012 single "Gangnam Style", performed in Korean. Expanding on the impact of "Dragostea din tei", Wolk of The Believer argued that "not even the words but the sound of the recording [are] now part of the fabric of the Internet", having become a "standard".

"Do you know 'Dragostea din tei' by O-Zone?" ― "No?" ― "'Course you do! The one that goes 'Maya hee, maya hoo, maya ha, maya ha-ha', then 'Nu mă nu mă iei, nu mă nu mă iei, nu mă nu mă nu mă iei'"

— The Calvert Journal's Hugh Morris elaborating on the global recognizability of the song's hooks, offering what he considered a typical mode of how the track is circulated among friends

Minto further discussed the track's influence on internet culture, characterizing "Dragostea din tei" as a precursor to modern Internet virality. He situated its spread at a cultural crossroads between the pre-Internet phenomenon of Los del Río's 1993 single "Macarena" and the ascent of "Gangnam Style" to global recognition through social media.

Following the commercial success of "Dragostea din tei", some publications referred to O-Zone as one-hit wonders. In a 2020 interview, Sîrbu acknowledged that it took him nearly a decade to rebuild his career after the song, remarking that sustaining momentum after such success was challenging.

=== Listicles ===
Listicle inclusions of "Dragostea din tei"
Publication	Year	List	Rank	Ref.
Rolling Stone	2015	50 Greatest Boy Band Songs of All Time	18	
Billboard	2018	100 Greatest Boy Band Songs of All Time	82	
Rolling Stone Australia	2020	75 Greatest Boy Band Songs of All Time	27	

== Use in popular media ==
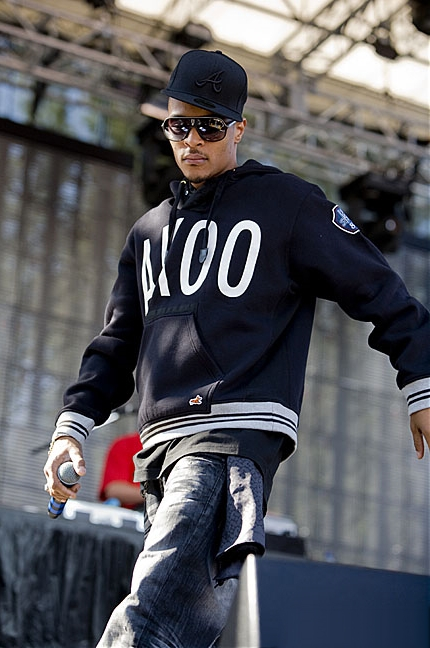
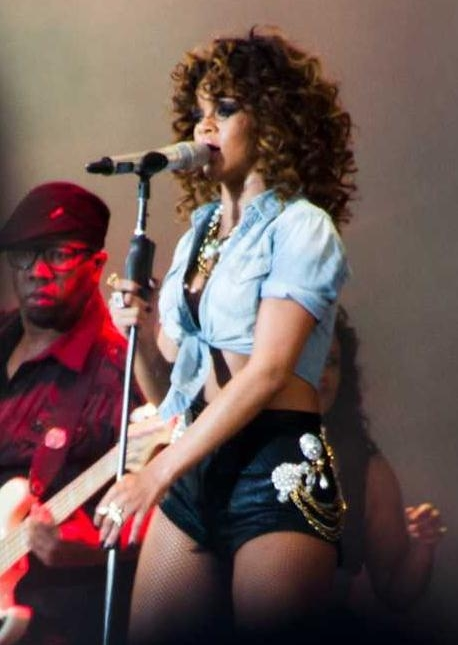
US Billboard Hot 100 number-one "Live Your Life" (2008) by T.I. (left; pictured in 2008) and Rihanna (right; pictured in 2011) samples and interpolates "Dragostea din tei".

"Dragostea din tei" has been adapted into over 35 languages. Among numerous parodies produced, "Le poulailler" by Le 6–9 and "Ma cé ki? Massimo" by Gargia—both released in 2004—became the top 10 songs in France, competing on the charts with both O-Zone's original and Haiducii's cover. Another parody, "Pluma Gay" released by Spanish comedy duo Los Morancos de Triana in 2005, featured gay-themed lyrics and gained popularity throughout Latin America. The parody contributed to the gay icons status of the O-Zone members within the region's LGBTQ community. In 2008, American rapper T.I. and Barbadian singer Rihanna released "Live Your Life", which samples and interpolates "Dragostea din tei". The song achieved global commercial success, topping the Billboard Hot 100 in the United States and reaching number two in the United Kingdom, among other territories.

Balan has reinterpreted "Dragostea din tei" in multiple projects. In 2006, he recorded a grunge version titled "Sugar Tunes Numa Numa" with his band Balan, and in 2008, he released "Numa Numa 2" as a B-side to his single "Mm-ma-ma" under the moniker Crazy Loop. A separate reinterpretation, also titled "Numa Numa 2", was issued in 2018 featuring American singer Marley Waters. In 2024, French DJ David Guetta and American band OneRepublic interpolated "Dragostea din tei" in their single "I Don't Wanna Wait", which reached the top 20 in several countries, including Germany and the United Kingdom. Other artists have also performed the song live, either as covers or parodies, such as Romanian singer Inna and American group Bloodhound Gang. It has additionally been featured in episodes of various international editions of Your Face Sounds Familiar—a show where celebrity contestants impersonate singers.

Both the original and derivative versions of "Dragostea din tei" have appeared in a variety of media. The song was included in the animated film Chicken Little (2005) for a reported licensing fee of US$$1 million, and was also used in Deuce Bigalow: European Gigolo (2005), Happy Feet Two (2011), and It's Only the End of the World (2016). Additionally, it was featured in an episode of the series Stargate Universe in 2011. Paired with Brolsma's "Numa Numa", "Dragostea din tei" was included in episodes of South Park and NCIS in 2008. The song also appeared as a playable track in the video game Just Dance 2017, and in Fortnite Battle Royale in 2022, where an emote―a preset animation―enabled players to have their in-game characters perform Brolsma's dance set to the soundtrack of "Dragostea din tei". It has also been used in various commercials, including for the beverage Yakult, Berlin's public transit company BVG, and the web browser Firefox; the latter also featured Brolsma. In 2010, Brolsma appeared performing a segment of "Dragostea din tei" in an ad for Vizio that aired during Super Bowl XLIV.

=== Comprehensive list of notable derivative recordings ===
Key
‡	Indicates cover, with original or rewritten lyrics
#	Indicates sample and/or interpolation

List of releases, with origin and selected chart positions
Year	Title Artist	Country of origin	Peak chart positions											Notes
Year	Title Artist	Country of origin	AUT	BEL (Fl)	BEL (Wa)	CIS	FRA	GER	JPN	NLD	SWI	UK	US	Notes
2003	"Dragostea din tei"‡ Haiducii	Romania; Italy	See § Haiducii version											
2004	"Allo!"‡ De Feestridders	Belgium	—	3	—	—	—	—	—	—	—	—	—	
2004	"Argent-Argent"‡ Cauet featuring Mopral	France	—	—	—	—	14	—	—	—	—	—	—	Parody
2004	"Festa no Apê"‡ Latino	Brazil	—	—	—	—	—	—	—	—	—	—	—	Lyrics rewritten in Portuguese. Experienced commercial success in Brazil.
2004	"Kumimies"‡ Frederik	Finland	—	—	—	—	—	—	—	—	—	—	—	Lyrics rewritten in Finnish
2004	"Le poulailler"‡ Le 6–9	France	—	—	8	—	2	―	—	—	30	—	—	Parody in French
2004	"Ma cé ki? Massimo"‡ Massimo Gargia	France	—	—	13	—	9	—	—	—	38	—	—	Parody
2004	"Muggen hier, muggen daar"‡ Gebroeders Ko	Netherlands	—	—	—	—	—	—	—	5 (Note: Charted as "Zonnebril/Muggen hier, muggen daar".)	—	—	—	Parody
2004	"Net Die Een Vir My (Maia Hee)"‡ Nicholis Louw and Shine4	South Africa	—	—	—	—	—	—	—	—	—	—	—	
2004	"Ra la la (Rudi hier, Rudi da)"‡ Bangman	Germany	—	—	—	—	—	41	—	—	—	—	—	Lyrics rewritten to delve on football themes. Used to promote Germany's participation in the UEFA Euro 2004 championship.
2004	"Rumba rej"‡ Toxic Babe	Czech Republic	—	—	—	—	—	—	—	—	—	—	—	Lyrics rewritten in Czech
2004	"Unsichtbar"‡ Lisa Aberer	Austria	—	—	—	—	—	—	—	—	—	—	—	Won the 2004 Kiddy Contest
2004	"Wenn der Hafer sticht"‡ Antonia aus Tirol	Austria	7	—	—	—	—	90	—	—	—	—	—	Lyrics rewritten in German language
2004	"Я её хой" ("Ya Yeyo Khoy")‡ Professor Lebedinsky featuring Russkiy Razmer and Dmitry Nagiyev	Russia	—	—	—	40	—	—	—	—	—	—	—	
2004	"Zauberschule"‡ Die Schlümpfe	Germany	—	—	—	—	—	—	—	—	—	—	—	
2005	"恋のブチアゲ" ("Koi no buchiage")‡ Maeken Trance Project	Japan	—	—	—	—	—	—	—	—	—	—	—	Medley of multiple songs, including a cover of "Dragostea din tei"
2005	"Pluma Gay"‡ Los Morancos de Triana	Spain	—	—	—	—	—	—	—	—	—	—	—	Also known as "Marica tú" (Spanish: "Gay You"). With lyrics rewritten in Spanish and altered to talk about partying and coming out, the parody attained commercial success in several Spanish-speaking territories and became popular with the LGBTQ community there. Also covered by Argentine band Los Sultanes.
2006	"Sem Drama Aguardarei"‡ Onda Choc	Portugal	—	—	—	—	—	—	—	—	—	—	—	
2006	"누나의 꿈" ("Sister's Dream")‡ Hyun Young	South Korea	—	—	—	—	—	—	—	—	—	—	—	Experienced commercial success in South Korea
2006	"Sugar Tunes Numa Numa"‡ Balan	Moldova	—	—	—	—	—	—	—	—	—	—	—	Grunge version
2007	"Bu Pa Bu Pa"‡ Jocie Guo	Singapore	—	—	—	—	—	—	—	—	—	—	—	Lyrics rewritten to delve on overcoming the fear of cockroaches
2007	"Người Tình Mai-Ya-Hee"‡ Vũ Hà	Vietnam	—	—	—	—	—	—	—	—	—	—	—	Lyrics rewritten in Vietnamese. Experienced commercial success in Vietnam. "Dragostea din tei" has also been covered in Vietnamese by Đan Trường.
2008	"Live Your Life"# T.I. featuring Rihanna	United States; Barbados	5	15	19	49	17	12	—	21	8	2	1	The song's co-producer Just Blaze came up with the idea of sampling and interpolating "Dragostea din tei" through Brolsma's viral video.
2008	"Numa Numa 2"‡ Crazy Loop	Moldova	—	—	—	—	—	—	—	—	—	—	—	Not to be confused with an unrelated video of Brolsma's of the same name
2008	"When You Leave (Numa Numa)"‡ Alina	Romania	—	—	—	—	—	—	—	—	—	—	— (Note: "When You Leave (Numa Numa)" did not chart on the Billboard Hot 100, but reached number six on the magazine's Hot Dance Airplay chart.)	Released as a remix produced by Swedish artist Basshunter
2011	"Dragostea din tei"‡ Hank Azaria and Happy Feet Two Chorus	United States	—	—	—	—	—	—	—	—	—	—	—	Recorded in a humppa version and included on the soundtrack of Happy Feet Two (2011)
2011	"Ma-Ya-Hi"‡ Jamatami	Germany	—	—	—	—	—	84	—	—	—	—	—	
2012	"Girls"# Gille	Japan	—	—	—	—	—	—	11	—	—	—	—	
2012	"My Life Is a Party"‡ ItaloBrothers	Germany	18	—	— (Note: "My Life Is a Party" did not chart on the Ultratop, but reached number 34 on the Ultratip extension chart.)	—	103	43	—	—	62	—	—	
2018	"Numa Numa 2"# Dan Balan featuring Marley Waters	Moldova; United States	—	—	—	78	—	—	64	—	—	—	—	Marketed as a continuation of "Dragostea din tei". Not to be confused with an unrelated video of Brolsma's of the same name. Released under the title "恋のマイアヒ2018" ("Koi no maiahi 2018") in Japan.
2019	"Dragostea din tei"‡ Dan Balan featuring Katerina Begu	Moldova; Ukraine	—	—	—	—	—	—	—	—	—	—	—	Cover performed on Holos Krainy by contestant Begu and juror Balan
2020	"Dragostea din tei"‡ Mira	Romania	—	—	—	—	—	—	—	—	—	—	—	
2021	"Dragostea din tei"‡ Julien Doré featuring Simone and Jean-Marc	France	—	—	—	—	—	—	—	—	—	—	—	
2021	"Faded Love"# Leony	Germany	11	31	—	—	—	17	—	58	24	—	—	
2022	"Dragostea din tei"‡ Feuerschwanz	Germany	—	—	—	—	—	—	—	—	—	—	—	Rock cover. Also performed while competing in the German national selection for the Eurovision Song Contest 2025.
2024	"I Don't Wanna Wait"# David Guetta and OneRepublic	France; United States	8	10	4	3	13	10	— (Note: "I Don't Wanna Wait" did not chart on the Billboard Japan Hot 100, but reached number eight on the magazine's Japan Hot Overseas chart.)	12	7	19	96	
2026	"Mama I'm Alright"# Baby Dont Cry	South Korea	—	—	—	—	—	—	—	—	—	—	—	
"—" denotes a recording that did not chart or was not released in that territory.

== Track listings ==
- Romanian CD single
1. "Dragostea din tei" – 3:33
2. "Despre tine" (Unu' in the Mix) – 7:38
3. "Dragostea din tei" (Unu' in the Dub Mix) – 3:39
4. "Numai tu" (Music video) – 4:10
5. "Despre tine" (Music video) – 3:53
- DACH CD single
1. "Dragostea din tei" (Original Romanian Version) – 3:33
2. "Dragostea din tei" (DJ Ross Radio Remix) – 4:15
3. "Dragostea din tei" (DJ Ross Extended Remix) – 6:22
4. "Dragostea din tei" (Original Italian Version) – 3:35
5. "Dragostea din tei" (Unu' in the Dub Mix) – 3:39
6. "Dragostea din tei" (Music video) – 4:46
- European and Swedish CD single 1
1. "Dragostea din tei" (Original Romanian Version) – 3:33
2. "Dragostea din tei" (DJ Ross Radio Remix) – 4:15
- European CD single 2
1. "Dragostea din tei" (Original Romanian Version) – 3:33
2. "Dragostea din tei" (Original Italian Version) – 3:35
- French CD single 1
1. "Dragostea din tei" (Original Romanian Version) – 3:33
2. "Dragostea din tei" (DJ Ross Radio Remix) – 4:15
3. "Dragostea din tei" (Original Italian Version) – 3:35
4. "Dragostea din tei" (Unu' in the Dub Mix) – 3:39
- French CD single 2
1. "Dragostea din tei" (Original Romanian Version) – 3:33
2. "Dragostea din tei" (Nectar Remix) – 5:57
3. "Dragostea din tei" (DJ Ross Extended Remix) – 6:22
4. "Dragostea din tei" (Spike Norton Tekmix) – 6:37
5. "Dragostea din tei" (Almighty Mix) – 7:00
- French 12-inch single 1
1. "Dragostea din tei" (Nectar Remix) – 5:57
2. "Dragostea din tei" (Spike Norton Flymix) – 6:34
3. "Dragostea din tei" (Spike Norton Tekmix) – 6:37
4. "Dragostea din tei" (Almighty Mix) – 7:00
- French 12-inch single 2
1. "Dragostea din tei" (DJ Ross Extended Remix) – 6:22
2. "Dragostea din tei" (Original Romanian Version) – 3:33
3. "Dragostea din tei" (Acapella) – 3:30
- German CD single
1. "Dragostea din tei" (Original Romanian Version) – 3:33
2. "Dragostea din tei" (DJ Ross Radio Remix) – 4:15
3. "Dragostea din tei" (DJ Ross Extended Remix) – 6:22
4. "Dragostea din tei" (Original Italian Version) – 3:35
5. "Dragostea din tei" (Unu' in the Dub Mix) – 3:39
- German mini CD and UK CD single 2
1. "Dragostea din tei" (Original Romanian Version) – 3:33
2. "Dragostea din tei" (DJ Ross Radio Remix) – 4:15
- Italian, Mexican, Dutch and Spanish CD single,
  and Swedish CD single 3
1. "Dragostea din tei" (Original Romanian Version) – 3:33
2. "Dragostea din tei" (Original Italian Version) – 3:35
3. "Dragostea din tei" (DJ Ross Radio Remix) – 4:15
4. "Dragostea din tei" (DJ Ross Extended Remix) – 6:22
5. "Dragostea din tei" (Unu' in the Dub Mix) – 3:39
- Italian 12-inch single
1. "Dragostea din tei" (DJ Ross Extended Remix) – 6:22
2. "Dragostea din tei" (DJ Ross Radio Remix) – 4:15
3. "Dragostea din tei" (Unu' in the Dub Mix) – 3:39
4. "Dragostea din tei" (Original Italian Version) – 3:35
5. "Dragostea din tei" (Original Romanian Version) – 3:33
- Spanish 12-inch single (Note: Reissued in 2025 by Blanco y Negro Music, replacing the "Original Italian Version" in favor of the "DJ Aligator vs. CS-Jay Club Version".)
1. "Dragostea din tei" (DJ Ross Extended Remix) – 6:22
2. "Dragostea din tei" (DJ Ross Radio Remix) – 4:15
3. "Dragostea din tei" (Original Italian Version) – 3:35
4. "Dragostea din tei" (Original Romanian Version) – 3:33
- Swedish CD single 2
1. "Dragostea din tei" (DJ Aligator vs. CS-Jay Radio Version) – 3:35
2. "Dragostea din tei" (Original Italian Version) – 3:35
3. "Dragostea din tei" (Original Romanian Version) – 3:33
4. "Dragostea din tei" (DJ Ross Radio Remix) – 4:15
5. "Dragostea din tei" (DJ Ross Extended Remix) – 6:22
6. "Dragostea din tei" (DJ Aligator vs. CS-Jay Club Version) – 6:04
- UK CD single 1
1. "Dragostea din tei" (Original Romanian Version) – 3:33
2. "Dragostea din tei" (Almighty Mix) – 6:58
3. "Dragostea din tei" (DJ Ross Extended Remix) – 6:22
4. "Dragostea din tei" (Unu' in the Dub Mix) – 3:39
5. "Dragostea din tei" (Almighty Dub) – 6:01
- UK 12-inch single
1. "Dragostea din tei" (Original Romanian Version) – 3:33
2. "Dragostea din tei" (DJ Ross Extended Remix) – 6:22
3. "Dragostea din tei" (Almighty Mix) – 6:58
4. "Dragostea din tei" (Almighty Dub) – 6:01
- US 12-inch single 1
1. "Ma Ya Hi" (featuring Lucas Prata) – 3:36
2. "Dragostea din tei" (Original Italian Version) – 3:35
3. "Dragostea din tei" (Original Romanian Version) – 3:33
4. "Dragostea din tei" (DJ Ross Extended Remix) – 6:22
5. "Dragostea din tei" (DJ Ross Radio Remix) – 4:15
- US 12-inch single 2
1. "Ma Ya Hi" (featuring Lucas Prata) [Valentin Remix Club Version] – 6:38
2. "Ma Ya Hi" (featuring Lucas Prata) – 3:37
3. "Dragostea din tei" (Original Italian Version) – 3:33
4. "Dragostea din tei" (DJ Ross Radio Remix) – 4:16
5. "Dragostea din tei" (DJ Ross Extended Remix) – 6:23
- Japanese CD single
1. "Dragostea din tei" – 3:39
2. "Dragostea din tei" (Overhead Champion Remix) – 6:46
3. "Dragostea din tei" (DJ Kaya & DJ Kousuke Remix) – 5:40
4. "Dragostea din tei" (Eurobeat Remix) – 4:09
5. "Dragostea din tei" (DJ Ross Extended Remix) – 6:23
- Japanese 12-inch single
1. "Dragostea din tei" (Overhead Champion Remix) – 6:46
2. "Dragostea din tei" (DJ Kaya & DJ Kousuke Remix) – 5:40
3. "Dragostea din tei" (Original Version) – 3:39
4. "Dragostea din tei" (Eurobeat Remix) – 4:09
- Other official digital versions (Note: This is a summary of all digital versions of the single that differ from those found on the CD releases.)
1. "Dragostea din tei" (Crystal Mix) – 3:45
2. "Dragostea din tei" (Seb Version) – 3:53
3. "Ma Ya Hi" (featuring Lucas Prata) [Valentin Radio Edit] – 3:34
4. "Dragostea din tei" (Ole Ed Remix) – 2:52
5. "Dragostea din tei" (Radu Sirbu Remix) – 3:35
6. "Dragostea din tei" (W&W Remix) – 2:54
7. "Dragostea din tei" (Besomorph & It's Different Remix) – 2:08

== Charts ==
=== Weekly charts ===
2003–2005 weekly chart performance for "Dragostea din tei"
Chart (2003–2005)	Peak position
Austria (Ö3 Austria Top 40)	1
Belgium (Ultratop 50 Flanders)	2
Belgium (Ultratop 40 Wallonia)	1
CIS Airplay (TopHit)	48
CIS Airplay (TopHit) Unu' in the Dub Mix	9
CIS Airplay (TopHit) DJ Ross Radio Remix	146
Czech Republic (IFPI)	2
Denmark (Tracklisten)	1
Europe (European Hot 100 Singles)	1
Europe (European Radio Airplay)	13
Finland (Suomen virallinen lista)	2
France (SNEP)	1
Germany (Media Control)	1
Hungary (Rádiós Top 40)	2
Hungary (Single Top 40)	5
Hungary (Dance Top 40)	3
Ireland (IRMA)	1
Italy (FIMI)	17
Japan (Oricon)	72
Netherlands (Dutch Top 40)	1
Netherlands (Single Top 100)	1
Norway (VG-lista)	1
Quebec (ADISQ)	12
Romania (Romanian Top 100)	1
Russia Airplay (TopHit)	72
Russia Airplay (TopHit) Unu' in the Dub Mix	31
Russia Airplay (TopHit) DJ Ross Radio Remix	116
Scotland (OCC)	2
Spain (PROMUSICAE)	1
Sweden (Hitlistan)	3
Switzerland (Schweizer Hitparade)	1
UK Singles (OCC)	3
Ukraine Airplay (TopHit) Unu' in the Dub Mix	7
Ukraine Airplay (TopHit) DJ Ross Radio Remix	68
US Bubbling Under Hot 100 (Billboard) Lucas Prata version (Valentin Remix)	16
US Digital Songs (Billboard) Lucas Prata version (Valentin Remix)	69
US Dance Airplay (Billboard) Lucas Prata version (Valentin Remix)	14
US Pop 100 (Billboard) Lucas Prata version (Valentin Remix)	72

2017 weekly chart performance for "Dragostea din tei"
Chart (2017)	Peak position
Ukraine Airplay (TopHit)	103

2024 weekly chart performance for "Dragostea din tei"
Chart (2024)	Peak position
Moldova Airplay (TopHit)	85

2026 weekly chart performance for "Dragostea din tei"
Chart (2026)	Peak position
Moldova Airplay (TopHit)	75

=== Monthly charts ===
2026 monthly chart performance for "Dragostea din tei"
Chart (2026)	Peak position
Moldova Airplay (TopHit)	88

=== Year-end charts ===
2003 year-end chart performance for "Dragostea din tei"
Chart (2003)	Position
Romania (Romanian Top 100)	12

2004 year-end chart performance for "Dragostea din tei"
Chart (2004)	Position
Austria (Ö3 Austria Top 40)	1
Belgium (Ultratop 50 Flanders)	7
Belgium (Ultratop 40 Wallonia)	1
CIS Airplay (TopHit) Unu' in the Dub Mix	73
Europe (European Hot 100 Singles)	1
France (SNEP)	1
Germany (Media Control)	1
Hungary (Rádiós Top 40)	48
Ireland (IRMA)	9
Netherlands (Dutch Top 40)	1
Netherlands (Single Top 100)	1
Russia Airplay (TopHit) Unu' in the Dub Mix	188
Sweden (Hitlistan)	15
Switzerland (Schweizer Hitparade)	1
UK Singles (OCC)	28
Ukraine Airplay (TopHit) Unu' in the Dub Mix	26

=== Decade-end charts ===
2000–2009 decade-end chart performance for "Dragostea din tei"
Chart (2000–2009)	Position
Austria (Ö3 Austria Top 40)	9
Germany (Media Control)	3
Netherlands (Single Top 100)	12

== Certifications and sales ==
Certifications and sales for "Dragostea din tei"
Region	Certification	Certified units/sales
Austria (IFPI Austria)	Platinum	30,000^{*}
Belgium (BRMA)	2× Platinum	100,000^{*}
Denmark (IFPI Danmark)	Gold	4,000^{^}
France (SNEP)	Diamond	750,000^{*}
Germany (BVMI)	2× Platinum	600,000^{^}
Italy (FIMI)	Gold	50,000^{‡}
Japan (RIAJ) Ringtone	4× Million	4,000,000^{*}
Japan (RIAJ) Full-length ringtone	Platinum	250,000^{*}
Japan (RIAJ) PC download	Gold	100,000^{*}
Netherlands (NVPI)	Platinum	60,000^{^}
New Zealand (RMNZ)	Gold	15,000^{‡}
Romania	—	250,000
Spain (Promusicae)	Gold	30,000^{‡}
Sweden (GLF)	Gold	10,000^{^}
Switzerland (IFPI Switzerland)	Platinum	40,000^{^}
United Kingdom (BPI)	Platinum	600,000^{‡}
United States (RIAA) Lucas Prata version	Gold	500,000^{*}
Summaries
Worldwide	—	12,000,000
^{*} Sales figures based on certification alone.^{^} Shipments figures based on certification alone.^{‡} Sales+streaming figures based on certification alone.

== Release history ==
Release dates for "Dragostea din tei"
Region	Date	Format	Label	Version	Ref.
Romania	c. June 2003	Radio airplay	Media Services	Original	
Romania	2003	CD single	Cat	Original	
DACH	2004	CD single	Universal	Original	
Europe	2004	CD single	BMG; Universal	Original	
France	14 April 2004	Unknown		Original	
France	2004	CD single	Universal	Original	
France	2004	12-inch single	Universal	Original	
Germany	2004	CD single	Polydor; Universal	Original	
Germany	2004	Mini CD	Polydor; Universal	Original	
Italy	2004	CD single	Time	Original	
Italy	2004	12-inch single	Time	Original	
Mexico	2004	CD single	Musart	Original	
Netherlands	2004	CD single	BMG	Original	
Spain	2004	CD single	Vale	Original	
Spain	2004	12-inch single	Vale	Original	
Sweden	2004	CD single	Bonnier	Original	
United Kingdom	24 May 2004	Unknown		Original	
United Kingdom	2004	CD single	Time	Original	
United Kingdom	2004	12-inch single	Jive	Original	
United States	2004	12-inch single	Ultra	Lucas Prata version	
United States	2004	12-inch single	Ultra	Lucas Prata original version and Valentin Remix	
United States	22 June 2004	Digital download	Media Services	Original	
United States	30 November 2004	Digital download	Time	Remix EP incl. Lucas Prata original version and Valentin Remix	
United States	Early 2005	Radio airplay	Unknown	Lucas Prata version (Valentin Remix)	
Japan	2005	CD single	Avex Trax	Original	
Japan	2006	12-inch single	Rhythm Republic	Original	
Various	Unknown	Digital download	Cat	Remix album	

== Haiducii version ==
"Dragostea din tei"
- Cover for the Belgian and Dutch physical release.

Single by Haiducii

from the album Paula Mitrache in Haiducii
- Language: Romanian
- Released: December 2003
- Studio: MM Studio
- Genre: Dance
- Length: 3:35
- Label: Universo
- Songwriter: Dan Balan
- Producer: Max Minoia

Haiducii singles chronology
"Dragostea din tei" (2003)	"Nara Nara Na Na (Mne s Toboy Horosho)" (2004)

Music video
- "Dragostea din tei" on YouTube

=== Background and composition ===
Italy-based Romanian singer Paula Monica Mitrache, professionally known as Haiducii, recorded a cover of "Dragostea din tei" after being advised to do so by her label Universo, despite initially opposing the idea. Her stage name was inspired by the song's reference to hajduks (Romanian: haiduci). The cover was produced and mixed by Max Minoia at MM Studio in Rome, Italy, and features uncredited vocals by Italian singer Vittorio Centrone, who provides the "Ma-ia-hii, Ma-ia-huu, Ma-ia-hoo, Ma-ia-haha" sequence. In Haiducii's dance version of the song, both a man and a woman are heard conversing—a concept which Rivista Studio's Francesco Gerardi compared to "Buonasera dottore" (1974) by Italian singer Claudia Mori. Wolk of The Believer categorized the cover as a "badly sung boy-and-girl duet".

=== Release ===
Haiducii's "Dragostea din tei" was released as her debut single in Italy in December 2003 by Universo. The track was later physically distributed in multiple territories throughout 2004, including France, Germany, Italy, Netherlands, Spain and the United States. These releases included a remix by Italian DJ and Eiffel 65 member Gabry Ponte. A digital remix EP became available for download on 3 August 2004 in various countries. In 2005, the track was issued in Taiwan under the title "嘜阿喜" ("Mai A Hi") by Avex Trax, featuring cartoon imagery used to promote the song. The cover was later included on Haiducii's studio album, Paula Mitrache in Haiducii (2008). A remix titled "Dragostea din tei 2k13", featuring vocals from Eiffel 65 lead singer Jeffrey Jey, was released in 2012. On 11 August 2023, Haiducii issued a solo re-recording of the song to mark its 20th anniversary.

=== Commercial performance ===
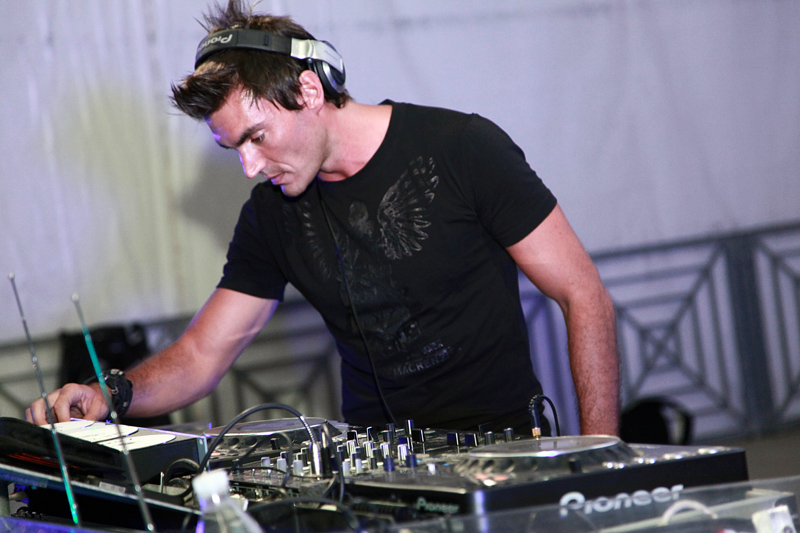
A remix produced by Italian DJ Gabry Ponte (pictured in 2011) significantly aided the song's performance on the Italian charts.

Haiducii's version achieved considerable commercial success, in some cases preceding O-Zone's original in international markets such as Germany, Italy, Spain, and France. In January 2004, it debuted at number one on the Italian singles chart, selling 200,000 copies and peaking higher than O-Zone's version. Aided by the Gabry Ponte remix, the single remained at number one for six weeks and spent over four months in the top 10.

The cover debuted and peaked at number four in Spain in March 2004, followed by number one in Austria and number two in France in April. In May, it reached number two in Wallonia, ranking just below O-Zone's version. In June 2004, the track peaked at number two in both Germany and Switzerland, number four in Norway, and number six in Flanders. It climbed to number two on the European Hot 100 Singles chart in July, and reached the top 10 in the Netherlands, Denmark, and Hungary. In Sweden, Haiducii's version topped the singles chart in August, outperforming O-Zone's, and remained at number one for five consecutive weeks, spending a total of five months in the top 10. In the United States, the single peaked at number four on the Dance Singles Sales chart in November 2004.

By year's end, the track had ranked among the top 10 best-performing singles of 2004 in Austria, Germany, Italy, Sweden, Switzerland, as well as on the European Hot 100 Singles chart. It also received gold certifications in Austria, Belgium, France, Sweden and Switzerland. As of February 2021, cumulative European sales of the single surpassed one million units.

=== Promotion ===
A music video accompanied the release of Haiducii's version, appearing in 2004 at the latest. The video opens with a man entering a hotel room and throwing himself on a bed before roaming the room and hallway. Meanwhile, Haiducii watches him via surveillance footage from a separate room. The man discovers the hidden camera and arrives at Haiducii's room, only to find it empty. There, he then views footage of her leaving, dressed in a red fur outfit. The video incorporates frequent four-way split screens and features Haiducii dancing in various outfits.

To promote the single, Haiducii performed on the Italian edition of Top of the Pops on 28 February 2004, and appeared at the Sanremo Music Festival 2004 on 4 March 2004. In France, she performed on La Chanson de l'année on 5 June 2004, and in Germany on Top of the Pops later that month and on Interaktiv on 24 June 2004. Haiducii became the subject of controversy in Germany after multiple scheduled appearances in cities such as Mannheim, Karlsruhe, and Leipzig were fulfilled by unprofessional impersonators lip-syncing as her. The deception went unnoticed for several days, misleading event organizers and broadcasters, until it was revealed that Haiducii had been performing live in Italy at the same time. Legal proceedings were subsequently initiated against the agency responsible for the fraudulent bookings. In later years, Haiducii appeared on Die ultimative Chartshow in Germany on 3 January 2020, and on ZDF-Fernsehgarten on 7 May 2023 in the same region. That same year, she also performed on Dai 60 ai 2000 in Italy on 27 September. In 2024, she made a surprise appearance on the Italian version of The Voice Senior during Centrone's audition to perform the song with him.

=== Dispute over legality and impact on the original version ===
In February 2004, Balan alleged that, although he had been credited as the songwriter, Haiducii's (Note: Initially, a Romanian male group of the same name was mistakenly implicated in the controversy.) version had been released without his permission. He threatened legal action against Haiducii and Universo unless the single was withdrawn. According to Balan, the label had cited an Italian law that allegedly allowed such covers without explicit consent; however, he contended that no such law existed or applied in this case, particularly as Haiducii was Romanian and the original song was recorded in Romania. Gerardi of Rivista Studio argued that Haiducii's approach was legally permissible at the time. According to Romanian media, both parties ultimately reached an agreement without any lawsuit ever being filed. In a 2016 interview, Haiducii confirmed that no legal action had been taken against her version.

Several commentators argued that Haiducii's cover played a pivotal role in drawing international attention to the original track. Gerardi wrote that O-Zone's version had enjoyed success in Romania and Moldova before being largely forgotten. However, once Haiducii's cover gained popularity, opportunities arose to initiate international distribution for the original version. Nonetheless, Balan described the coexistence of the cover as an obstacle in promoting the original internationally, stating that the band had to persuade record labels that the track was their own.

=== Other usage ===
In 2009, a version of the song titled "Maya Hi, Maya Hu", credited to Swedish animated character Crazy Frog, was released. In 2019, Haiducii collaborated with Catholic priest Don Allessandrou Cosu to release "Parliamo di Gesú" (Italian: "Let's Talk About Jesus"), a religious adaptation of the song, published on YouTube. The music video, filmed inside a church, went viral on Italian social media in 2021. In June 2023, Italian artist Caffellatte and Haiducii released the single "Troppo Chic (Dragostea din tei)", incorporating portions of "Dragostea din tei" that Haiducii re-recorded. The duo performed the song live on the Italian music programme Radio Norba Cornetto Battiti Live.

=== Track listings ===
- Austrian, Italian, Dutch, US and Taiwanese CD single,
  and Swedish CD single 1
1. "Dragostea din tei" (Original Mix) – 3:35
2. "Dragostea din tei" (Haiducii vs. Gabry Ponte Radio Version) – 3:42
3. "Dragostea din tei" (DJ Ross 4 the Radio Remix) – 4:15
4. "Dragostea din tei" (Haiducii vs. Gabry Ponte Extended Version) – 6:30
5. "Dragostea din tei" (DJ Ross 4 the Club Remix) – 6:22
- Belgian and French CD single
1. "Dragostea din tei" (Original Mix) – 3:35
2. "Dragostea din tei" (Haiducii vs. Gabry Ponte Radio Version) – 3:42
3. "Dragostea din tei" (DJ Ross 4 the Radio Remix) – 4:15
- French 12-inch single
1. "Dragostea din tei" (DJ Ross 4 the Club Remix) – 6:22
2. "Dragostea din tei" (Haiducii vs. Gabry Ponte Extended Version) – 6:30
3. "Dragostea din tei" (Original Mix) – 3:35
- German CD single 1 and Swiss CD single
1. "Dragostea din tei" (Original Mix) – 3:35
2. "Dragostea din tei" (Haiducii vs. Gabry Ponte Radio Version) – 3:42
3. "Dragostea din tei" (DJ Ross 4 the Radio Remix) – 4:15
4. "Dragostea din tei" (Haiducii vs. Gabry Ponte Extended Version) – 6:30
5. "Dragostea din tei" (DJ Ross 4 the Club Remix) – 6:22
6. "Dragostea din tei" (Potatoheadz Club Mix) – 6:55
7. "Spring" – 7:17
- German CD single 2
1. "Dragostea din tei" (Original Mix) – 3:35
2. "Dragostea din tei" (Haiducii vs. Gabry Ponte Extended Version) – 6:30
3. "Dragostea din tei" (DJ Friki Remix) – 5:17
4. "Dragostea din tei" (Karaoke Version) – 3:35
5. "Dragostea din tei" (Music Video) – 3:35
6. Kultvideo von DJ Friki – 2:21
- Italian 12-inch single
1. "Dragostea din tei" (Haiducii vs. Gabry Ponte Extended Version) – 6:30
2. "Dragostea din tei" (Haiducii vs. Gabry Ponte Radio Version) – 3:42
3. "Dragostea din tei" (DJ Ross 4 the Club Remix) – 6:22
4. "Dragostea din tei" (Original Mix) – 3:35
- Spanish CD single
1. "Dragostea din tei" (Haiducii vs. Gabry Ponte Radio Version) – 3:42
2. "Dragostea din tei" (DJ Ross 4 the Radio Remix) – 4:15
3. "Dragostea din tei" (Haiducii vs. Gabry Ponte Extended Version) – 6:31
4. "Dragostea din tei" (DJ Ross 4 the Club Remix) – 6:22
- Sweden CD single 2
1. "Dragostea din tei" (Original Version) – 3:35
2. "Dragostea din tei" (Haiducii vs. Gabry Ponte Radio Version) – 3:42
- Other official digital versions (Note: This is a summary of all digital versions of the single that differ from those found on the CD releases.)
1. "Dragostea din tei 2k13" (Gabry Ponte featuring Haiducii and Jeffrey Jey) [Radio Edit] – 3:26
2. "Dragostea din tei 2k13" (Gabry Ponte featuring Haiducii and Jeffrey Jey) [Extended] – 4:52
3. "Dragostea din tei 2k13" (Gabry Ponte featuring Haiducii and Jeffrey Jey) [Alien Cut & Dino Brown Radio Remix] – 3:38
4. "Dragostea din tei 2k13" (Gabry Ponte featuring Haiducii and Jeffrey Jey) [Alien Cut & Dino Brown Remix] – 5:46
5. "Dragostea din tei" (with Dual Beat and Mr. Frog) [Future Rave Extended Mix] – 5:30
6. "Dragostea din tei" (with Dual Beat and Mr. Frog) [Future Rave Radio Mix] – 3:18

=== Charts ===
==== Weekly charts ====
2004 weekly chart performance for Haiducii's version of "Dragostea din tei"
Chart (2004)	Peak position
Austria (Ö3 Austria Top 40)	1
Belgium (Ultratop 50 Flanders)	5
Belgium (Ultratop 40 Wallonia)	2
Denmark (Tracklisten)	7
Europe (European Hot 100 Singles)	2
France (SNEP)	2
Germany (Media Control)	2
Hungary (Single Top 40)	5
Hungary (Dance Top 40)	1
Italy (FIMI)	1
Netherlands (Dutch Top 40)	8
Netherlands (Single Top 100)	4
Norway (VG-lista)	4
Spain (PROMUSICAE)	4
Sweden (Hitlistan)	1
Switzerland (Schweizer Hitparade)	2
US Dance Singles Sales (Billboard)	4

==== Year-end charts ====
2004 year-end chart performance for Haiducii's version of "Dragostea din tei"
Chart (2004)	Position
Austria (Ö3 Austria Top 40)	3
Belgium (Ultratop 50 Flanders)	14
Belgium (Ultratop 40 Wallonia)	22
Europe (European Hot 100 Singles)	9
France (SNEP)	39
Germany (Media Control)	9
Italy (FIMI)	3
Netherlands (Dutch Top 40)	82
Netherlands (Single Top 100)	28
Sweden (Hitlistan)	5
Switzerland (Schweizer Hitparade)	9

==== Decade-end charts ====
2000–2009 decade-end chart performance for Haiducii's version of "Dragostea din tei"
Chart (2000–2009)	Position
Austria (Ö3 Austria Top 40)	77
Germany (Media Control)	95

=== Certifications and sales ===
Certifications and sales for Haiducii's version of "Dragostea din tei"
Region	Certification	Certified units/sales
Austria (IFPI Austria)	Gold	15,000^{*}
Belgium (BRMA)	Gold	25,000^{*}
France (SNEP)	Gold	250,000^{*}
Italy	—	200,000
Sweden (GLF)	Gold	10,000^{^}
Switzerland (IFPI Switzerland)	Gold	20,000^{^}
Summaries
Europe	—	1,000,000
^{*} Sales figures based on certification alone.^{^} Shipments figures based on certification alone.

=== Release history ===
Release dates for Haiducii's version of "Dragostea din tei"
Region	Date	Format	Label	Version	Ref.
Italy	December 2003	Unknown	Universo	Original	
Austria	2004	CD single	Edel	Original	
Belgium	2004	CD single	ARS Productions	Original	
France	2004	CD single	Universo	Original	
France	2004	12-inch single	Bertelsmann	Original	
Germany	2004	CD single	Ministry of Sound; Mach1	Original	
Italy	2004	CD single	Sony	Original	
Italy	2004	12-inch single	Spy	Original	
Netherlands	2004	CD single	Digidance	Original	
Spain	2004	CD single	Blanco y negro	Original	
Sweden	2004	CD single	Media Services; EMI	Original	
Switzerland	2004	CD single	Ministry of Sound	Original	
United States	2004	CD single	Empire Musicwerks	Original	
Various	3 August 2004	Digital download	Unknown	Remix EP	
Taiwan	2005	CD single	Avex Trax	Original	

== See also ==
- List of best-selling singles
- List of best-selling singles in France
- List of best-selling singles in Japan
- List of best-selling singles by country
- List of best-selling singles by year (Germany)
- List of music released by Moldovan artists that has charted in major music markets
- List of music released by Romanian artists that has charted in major music markets
- List of number-one hits of 2004 (Austria)
- List of Ultratop 40 number-one singles of 2004
- List of number-one songs of the 2000s (Denmark)
- List of European number-one hits of 2004
- List of number-one singles of 2004 (France)
- List of number-one hits of 2004 (Germany)
- List of number-one hits of 2004 (Italy)
- List of number-one singles of 2004 (Ireland)
- List of Dutch Top 40 number-one singles of 2004
- List of number-one songs in Norway
- List of Romanian Top 100 number ones
- List of number-one singles of 2004 (Spain)
- List of number-one singles and albums in Sweden
- List of number-one singles of the 2000s (Switzerland)
- List of artists who reached number one in Ireland
- French Top 100 singles of the 2000s
