= Minisztár =

Hungarian pop group

- Origin: Hungary
- Genres: Dance, Pop, Electronica
- Years active: 2005-2007
- Label: Sony BMG
- Members: Georgina Polyákovics, Vivien Gonda, Márkó Takács

Minisztár was a Hungarian pop group formed in 2005 and consisting of Georgina ('Gina') Polyákovics, Vivien Gonda and Márkó ('Márk') Takács. The band has released two albums to date, as well as a video DVD, before disbanding in the summer of 2007. The group is one of many to cover the popular song Dragostea Din Tei.

== Discography ==
- Minisztár (2005)
- Minidiszkó (2006)

== Track list ==
- Minisztâr (2005)

Track Number	Name	English Translation
1	Doktorbá	Ph. D
2	Robi a robot	Rob the Robot
3	Tinidal	Teenage Song
4	Titkos SMS	Secret SMS
5	Kacsatánc	Duckdance
6	Dragostea din tei	Love from the Linden Trees
7	Karnevál az iskolában	Carnival in the School
8	Gyere táncolj!	Come Dance!
9	Szerelem egy életen át	Love for a Lifetime
10	Ketchup Song	(Same)
11	Hány lába van?	How many legs?
12	Robi a robot [Remix]	(see above)
13	Titkos SMS [Remix]	(see above)

- Minidiszkó (2006)

Track Number	Name	English Translation
1	Nyár Van	It is Summer
2	Tüz A Vízzel	Fire Water
3	Luftballon	(Unknown)
4	Barbie Girl	n/a
5	Ábránd	Fantasy
6	Hips Don't Lie	n/a
7	Angyalka Repül	Flying Angel
8	La Camisa Negra	The Black Shirt
9	Me Tudsz Te A Szerelemröl	Do you know my love?
10	Gyere És Álmodj	Come and Dream
11	Boro Boro	Go Go (Farsi)
12	Egy Álom	A Dream
13	Tüz A Vízzel (Karaoke Verzió)	(see above) -Karaoke
14	Ábránd (Karaoke Verzió)	(see above) -Karaoke
15	Angyalka Repül (Karaoke Verzió)	(see above) -Karaoke
16	Mit Tudsz Te A Szerelemröl (Karaoke Verzió)	(see above) -Karaoke
17	Egy Álom (Karaoke Verzió)	(see above) -Karaoke

== DVD releases ==
- Mini tánc (2006)

== See also ==
- "Dragostea Din Tei"
