= Jamatami =

German musical group

- Origin: Germany
- Years active: 2011-2012, 2021
- Labels: Coconut
- Past members: Yasmine „Jazz“ Melody Vogel; Martijn „Matt“ Stoffers "Tamer"; Miriam „Miri“ Jäger

Jamatami was a German musical group created in 2011 through casting by station Super RTL. The members of the group are Jazz, Miriam, Tamer and Matt. The group is best known for their singles "Perfect Day (Tic Tac Toe)", "Dance Under The Moonlight", "Ma-Ya-Hi" and "Astronaut" and for their television reality series Jamatami: Das Star-Tagebuch, which aired on Super RTL during 2011. Jamatami disbanded on August 24, 2012, after performing a farewell concert to focus on solo activities.

In 2021, Jamatami returned to release a new single, a cover of "Wellerman", likely due to the song trending on TikTok at the time.

== Formation and Success ==
During the spring of 2011, RTL did a casting call for a new pop group. The members chosen were Jazz, Miriam, Matt and Tamer. During this time, the band members became good friends and decided to name their band Jamatami after each of the members, Ja(zz) Ma(tt) Ta(mer) Mi(riam) (with their name sometimes being stylized as JAMATAMI or JaMaTaMi). The group had their first appearance in the Toggo Tour during 2011. Around the same time, they began starring in the reality series Jamatami: Das Star-Tagebuch, which follows the group during their formation and rise to success.

On May 13, 2011, Jamatami released their first single "Perfect Day (Tic Tac Toe)", which included the b-side track "Rollercoaster". The song, in promotion with Super RTL, would become the group's biggest and most notable hit single. On June 17, 2011, their debut album "Tic Tac Toe" was released in Germany, Austria and Switzerland. It debuted in the German charts on July 4, 2011, peaking at #38 for 4 weeks. They later released the follow-up single "Dance Under The Moonlight" on July 15, 2011, which was also successful in Germany. On September 23, 2011, their third single "Ma-Ya-Hi", a cover of the hit single "Dragostea Din Tei" by O-Zone, debuted in the German charts at #84, staying there for 1 week. Following it, Jamatami did many concerts throughout Germany during the Toggo Tour.

== Sudden Split and Farewell Concert ==
On January 27, 2012, Jamatami returned with their fourth single, a new song called "Astronaut", which included a B-side track, a cover of Kylie Minogue's hit single "I Should Be So Lucky". The group also performed some concerts during February, with Matt uploading a video of him and Miriam performing a cover of Adele's "Someone Like You" before heading out for a concert.

In 2012 the members of Jamatami decided to split up and focus on solo projects. The first announcement of a "farewell concert" was made by Miriam and Jazz on their official Facebook fanpages on May 2, 2012, with the concert already having been scheduled previously. During the summer, the members spent time preparing their solo material, which they planned to present at the Jamatami farewell concert, scheduled for August 24, 2012.

On August 24, 2012, the members reunited in Germany for a final concert before officially disbanding, performing many of their past hits and popular songs. Also, during this concert, Tamer performed for the first time his new single, titled "Dance All Night" and a cover of Cher's hit single "Believe". Jazz also performed her new solo single as Jazz Mine, titled "Something Special". Matt also performed new material at the concert.

== Solo careers ==
Since the disbandment, Tamer released a single called "Verbrannt" (Burned).

Matt got the main part in a Disney Musical; Disney's Live; Mickey's Rock And Road Show. A few years later Matt took part of the successful Germany boyband FEUERHERZ.

== Discography ==
=== Albums ===
- 2011: Tic Tac Toe

=== Singles ===
- 2011: Perfect Day (Tic Tac Toe)
- 2011: Dance Under The Moonlight
- 2011: Ma-Ya-Hi
- 2012: Astronaut
- 2021: Wellerman
