= List of Dutch Top 40 number-one singles of 2004 =

These hits topped the Dutch Top 40 in 2004 (see 2004 in music).

Issue date	Song	Artist(s)
3 January	"Afscheid nemen bestaat niet"	Marco Borsato
10 January	"Afscheid nemen bestaat niet"	Marco Borsato
17 January	"Afscheid nemen bestaat niet"	Marco Borsato
24 January	"Afscheid nemen bestaat niet"	Marco Borsato
31 January	"Afscheid nemen bestaat niet"	Marco Borsato
7 February	"Afscheid nemen bestaat niet"	Marco Borsato
14 February	"Ramaganana"	Treble
21 February	"Dreamer (Gussie's song)"	Dinand Woesthoff
28 February	"Dreamer (Gussie's song)"	Dinand Woesthoff
6 March	"Voorbij"	Marco Borsato and Do
13 March	"Voorbij"	Marco Borsato and Do
20 March	"Voorbij"	Marco Borsato and Do
27 March	"Yeah!"	Usher and Lil Jon and Ludacris
3 April	"Yeah!"	Usher and Lil Jon and Ludacris
10 April	"Yeah!"	Usher and Lil Jon and Ludacris
17 April	"Yeah!"	Usher and Lil Jon and Ludacris
24 April	"Fuck It (I Don't Want You Back)"	Eamon
1 May	"Fuck It (I Don't Want You Back)"	Eamon
8 May	"Fuck It (I Don't Want You Back)"	Eamon
15 May	"Fuck It (I Don't Want You Back)"	Eamon
22 May	"When You Think of Me"	Boris
29 May	"When You Think of Me"	Boris
5 June	"When You Think of Me"	Boris
12 June	"I Don't Wanna Know"	Mario Winans and Enya and P. Diddy
19 June	"Holiday in Spain"	Counting Crows & Bløf
26 June	"Holiday in Spain"	Counting Crows & Bløf
3 July	"Holiday in Spain"	Counting Crows & Bløf
10 July	"Holiday in Spain"	Counting Crows & Bløf
17 July	"Holiday in Spain"	Counting Crows & Bløf
24 July	"Dragostea din Tei"	O-Zone
31 July	"Dragostea din Tei"	O-Zone
7 August	"Dragostea din Tei"	O-Zone
14 August	"Dragostea din Tei"	O-Zone
21 August	"Dragostea din Tei"	O-Zone
28 August	"Dragostea din Tei"	O-Zone
4 September	"Dragostea din Tei"	O-Zone
11 September	"Dragostea din Tei"	O-Zone
18 September	"Dragostea din Tei"	O-Zone
25 September	"Wat zou je doen"	Marco Borsato and Ali B
2 October	"Wat zou je doen"	Marco Borsato and Ali B
9 October	"Zij gelooft in mij"	André Hazes
16 October	"Zij gelooft in mij"	André Hazes
23 October	"Wat zou je doen"	Marco Borsato and Ali B
30 October	"Wat zou je doen"	Marco Borsato and Ali B
6 November	"Zinloos"	Lange Frans & Baas B and Ninthe
13 November	"Zinloos"	Lange Frans & Baas B and Ninthe
20 November	"Zinloos"	Lange Frans & Baas B and Ninthe
27 November	"1001 Arabian Nights"	Ch!pz
4 December	"1001 Arabian Nights"	Ch!pz
11 December	"1001 Arabian Nights"	Ch!pz
18 December	"1001 Arabian Nights"	Ch!pz
25 December	"Bigger Than That"	Men2B

== Number-one artists ==
Position	Artist	Weeks #1
1	Marco Borsato	13
2	O-Zone	9
3	Counting Crows	5
3	Ch!pz	4
3	Eamon	4
3	Usher	4
4	Boris Titulaer	3
4	Lange Frans & Baas B	3
5	André Hazes	2
5	Dinand Woesthoff	2
6	Mario Winans	1
6	Men2B	1
6	Treble	1

== See also ==
- 2004 in music
