= Los Morancos =

Spanish comedians

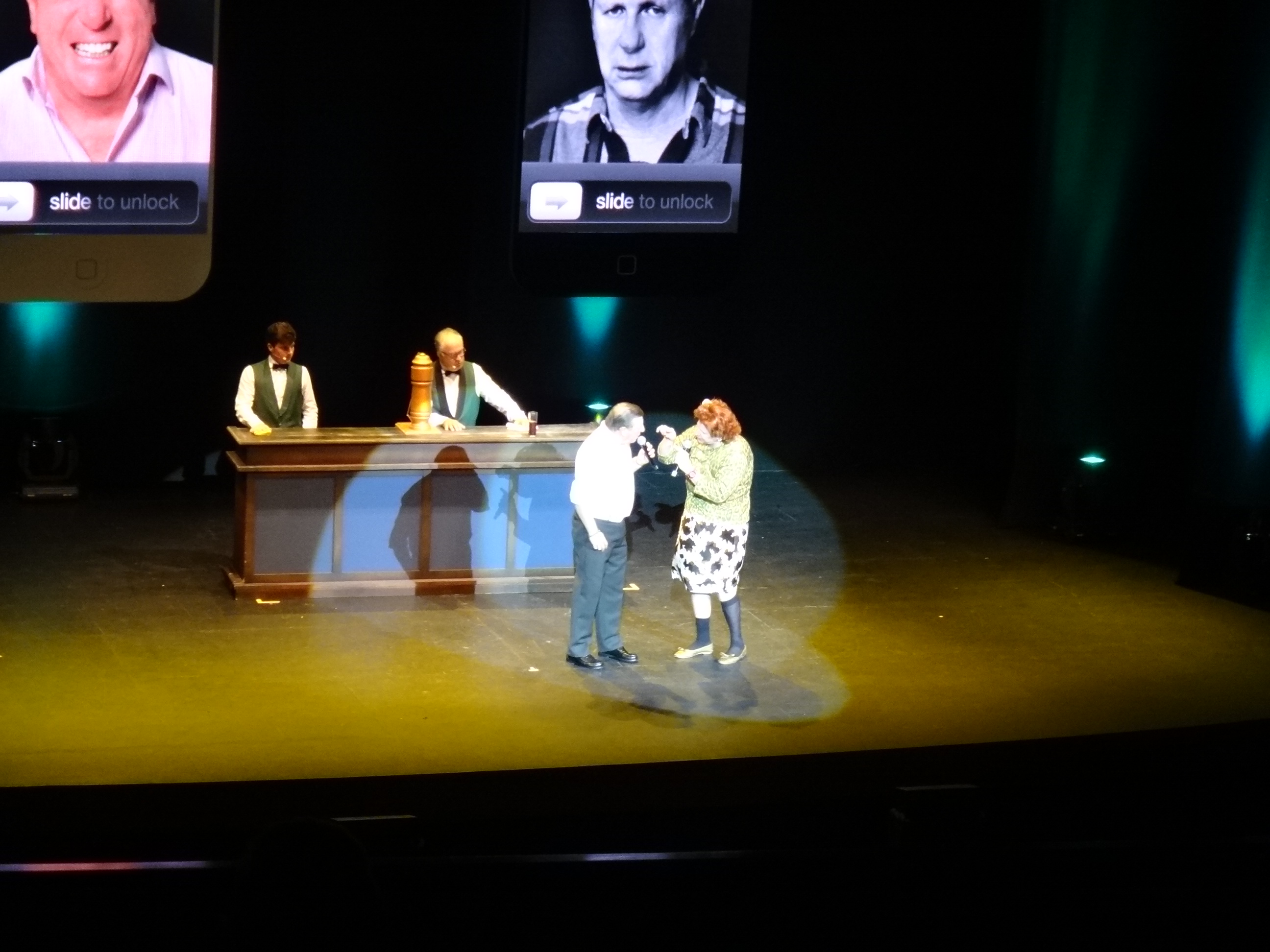

Background information
- Origin: Triana, Seville, Andalusia, Spain
- Genres: Comedy
- Years active: 1984–present
- Members: Jorge Cadaval; César Cadaval

Los Morancos, originally known as Los Morancos de Triana, are a pair of Spanish comedians formed by brothers César and Jorge Cadaval. They originate from El Tardón, an area of Triana in Seville, Andalusia.

== Biography ==
César and Jorge started out with popular performances throughout Andalusia. They appeared on television for the first time on popular TVE game show Un, dos, tres... responda otra vez on 17 February 1984, starting with magazine reviews and as uncredited secondary characters in comedy sketches by Analía Gadé and Forges. At the end of that year they appeared on TVE's New Year show Viva 85, where they performed a spoof of flamenco performed in English, which made them known nationally. They stayed with Un, dos, tres... throughout 1985 and their spoofs of various celebrities made them rise to fame.

From 1989 until 1990 they appeared on the TVE variety show Pero ¿esto qué es?, where they continued with their short parodies of celebrities, around 10–15 minutes each. In 1992, they transitioned to the big screen as script writers for the film Sevilla Connection.

In 1994 they signed a golden handcuffs contract with TVE to make new programmes and specials where they always received a big audience. They also made their first New Year's special. Around the turn of the millennium they also ventured into theatre, performing numerous times in the Teatro Imperial in Seville.

Their spoof of the O-Zone song Dragostea Din Tei, which they called Marica tú, became a hit across Hispanic America, and their refrain "Fiesta, fiesta, y pluma, pluma gay" became a Spanish-language gay anthem.

In 2017, their appearance on El Hormiguero was marked by their spoof of Justin Timberlake's single Can't Stop the Feeling! in which they pranked host Pablo Motos by convincing all the show's regulars to join them instead of him.

== Television appearances ==
Year	Show	Channel	Role; notes
1985	Viva 85	TVE	
1989	Pensión al patio	Canal Sur	
1989–90	Pero... ¿esto qué es?	TVE	
1991	Un, dos, tres... responda otra vez	TVE	Comedians; guests
1991–92	El gordo	TVE	
1992	Sevilla Connection	TVE	Writers
1993	Cincuenta y cinco minutos en Pekín	TVE	
1993	Hasta aquí hemos llegado	TVE	New Year's special
1994	Bienvenidos a la feria	TVE	
1994	Eráse una vez Los Morancos	TVE	
1994	Directo al turrón	TVE	
1994	Un día entre vacaciones	TVE	
1995	Llévatelo calentito	TVE	
1996	Llevátelo calentito de verdad	TVE	
1996	Vaya veranito	TVE	
1997	Dos morancos para hoy	TVE	
1997–98	Entre Morancos y Omaítas	TVE	
1997	Suerte y al toro	TVE	
1997	La primera en el frente	TVE	
	Navidad a 20 duros	TVE	
1998	Aligera y pon la primera	TVE	
1998	Con vistas al mar	TVE	
	El Medinas Medinero	TVE	
1999	Será por milenios	TVE	
	A corazón abierto	TVE	
	Por un puñado de euros	TVE	
2000	El burladero	TVE	
2001	Omaita en la primera	TVE	
2002	The Morancos Chou	TVE	
2002	Especies protegidas	TVE	
2003	El retorno de Omaíta	TVE	
2004–05	Moranquissimo	TVE	
2005–08	Los Reorridos con todas las maneras	TVE	
2006	Morancos Channel nº 5	Telecinco	
2007	Morancos 007	TVE	
2008, 2009	Tú sí que vales	Telecinco	Jurado
2008	El Hormiguero	Cuatro	Invitados
2008	¡Mira quién baila!	TVE	Jorge como concursante y César como jurado
2009	¿Dónde estás corazón?	Antena 3	
2009	Pánico en el plató	Antena 3	
2010	Carnaval de Cádiz	Antena 3	
2011–12	Qué buen puntito	Canal Sur	
2013	La puerta del tiempo	TVE	
2015	¡Qué noche la de Reyes!	TVE	
2015	Jugamos en casa	TVE	Presentadores del concurso
2017	El Hormiguero 3.0	Antena 3	Invitados
2019	Mi casa es la tuya	Telecinco	
2021	Tu cara me suena	Antena 3	Concursantes
2021	Pasapalabra	Antena 3	Concursantes
2022–23	Campanadas 2023	TVE	
