= Yeah! (Usher song) =

2004 single by Usher

Single by Usher featuring Lil Jon and Ludacris

from the album Confessions
- B-side: "Red Light"; "Sweet Lies"
- Released: January 10, 2004
- Studio: Circle House Studios (Miami, FL); Rondor Studios (Los Angeles, CA); Larrabee Sound West (West Hollywood, CA)
- Genre: Crunk&B; hip-hop
- Length: 4:10
- Label: Arista
- Songwriters: Jonathan Smith; Christopher Bridges; Sean Garrett; Patrick Smith; James Phillips; LaMarquis Jefferson; Robert McDowell
- Producer: Lil Jon

Usher singles chronology
"Can U Help Me" (2002)	"Yeah!" (2004)	"Burn" (2004)

Lil Jon singles chronology
"Come Get Some" (2003)	"Yeah!" (2004)	"Culo" (2004)

Ludacris singles chronology
"Blow It Out" (2003)	"Yeah!" (2004)	"Splash Waterfalls" (2004)

Music video
- "Yeah!" on YouTube

"Yeah!" is a song by American singer Usher featuring American rappers Lil Jon and Ludacris. The song is written by the featured artists alongside Sean Garrett, J. Que, Robert McDowell, and LRoc, and is produced by Lil Jon. The song incorporates crunk and R&B—which Lil Jon coined as crunk&B—in the song's production. The song was released as the lead single from Usher's fourth studio album Confessions (2004) on January 10, 2004, after Usher was told by Arista Records, his label at the time, to record more tracks for the album.

"Yeah!" topped the US Billboard Hot 100 chart for 12 consecutive weeks, before being dethroned by Usher's follow-up single "Burn". "Yeah!" was the longest-running number one single in 2004, subsequently topping the year-end chart on the Hot 100. It was thirteen-times platinum by the Recording Industry Association of America (RIAA). The song received a similar response in other countries, topping in other twelve charts worldwide. It was certified platinum in several countries, including Australia, Belgium, Canada, Germany, and Norway, and received a two-times platinum certification in New Zealand. The song peaked in the top 10 in several year-end charts.

An accompanying music video, directed by Mr. X, shows the artists performing choreography in a club in front of blue laser beams. "Yeah!" won a Best Rap/Sung Collaboration at the 47th Annual Grammy Awards, while being nominated for Record of the Year. The song ranked second on the Billboard Hot 100 2000–2009 Decade-end chart. As of February 2024, the song has sold over 13 million copies in the U.S.

== Background and release ==
In late 2003, Usher submitted his fourth studio album, Confessions (2004), to his record label Arista Records. However, when the singer and the company's then-president L.A. Reid listened to the songs, Reid felt the album lacked a song that had the potential to be released as the album's lead single. In light of this, Usher was told to record a few more tracks, and so he enlisted Lil Jon to aid in musical production. Lil Jon recalled, "He [Usher] needed a single. They had 'Burn', 'Burn' was hot, but they needed that first powerful monster. That's when I came in."

Several months prior to Lil Jon's involvement in the production of Confessions, he was commissioned by Jive Records to produce fifteen tracks for Mystikal. The rapper would only select two tracks, which provided Lil Jon the opportunity to give leftover songs to other record labels. Without Lil Jon's knowledge, Jive Records gave one of the leftover tracks to Petey Pablo which would eventually become "Freek-a-Leek". However, Lil Jon, assuming that the song had not been used, gave the production to Usher, resulting in a rough version of "Yeah!". Eventually realizing the mistake after Pablo played "Freek-a-Leek" to Lil Jon, the latter insisted on producing more tracks for Pablo; however, Pablo did not give up the song, due to the fact that it was already recorded and had been getting responses from Southern radio. Lil Jon commented, "With so much invested, Jive wouldn't give up the cut." Lil Jon jumped back in the studio and created an equally catchy replacement track. Though "Yeah!" was now completed, the label still had "Burn" on queue for the lead single. Usher's friend and former A&R rep Kawan "KP" Prather commented: "'Burn' being a great song is one thing, but it's one of them things where people said, 'It's strong, but can we make history with that?' At the end of the day, you want an event." Usher was still unsure if "Yeah!" was the right choice.

Lil Jon, who is also a DJ, then decided to leak the record to DJs across the country after the record companies shut down for Christmas break. By the time they got back to business in January, the record already had thousands of radio plays with no label involvement. Usher still opted to go with "Burn" as the lead single as a music video was already planned, however, the responses to "Yeah!" were overwhelmingly favorable, and "Yeah!" was released as the first single with "Burn" becoming the second single from the album. The single was released in the United States on January 27, 2004, as a CD single and 12" single. LaFace Records sent "Yeah!" to US contemporary hit radio on February 7, 2004. In the United Kingdom, it was released as a CD single, containing the album and instrumental version of the song, and two additional tracks from the album, "Red Light" (also produced by Lil Jon) and "Sweet Lies".

== Composition ==
"Yeah!"
"Yeah!" uses elements of crunk and R&B, which Lil Jon coined as crunk&B.

"Yeah!" combines the genres of crunk and R&B, creating an all new form called crunk&B, which Lil Jon described as "R&B songs that get you crunk, make you wanna wild out". Entertainment Weekly's Jem Aswad found the song to contain crunk and transition between hip hop, soul and ballad genres. The song was co-written by Sean Garrett, Patrick "J. Que" Smith, Ludacris, Robert McDowell, and James "LRoc" Phillips. According to the sheet music published at Musicnotes.com by Sony/ATV Music Publishing, "Yeah!" is written in common time with a moderately slow tempo of 105 beats per minute, written in the key of G minor. Usher's vocal range spans from the low note of B♭_{3} to the high note of B♭_{4}.

== Critical reception ==
"Yeah!" was an uncomplicated song about flirting with girls in a night club; it left plenty of air-conditioned space for Usher to coo and for the producer Lil Jon to bark the interjections [...] The lyrics were delivered like flashes of light: brief, anxious, and exciting, and perfectly suited to a voice that is long on control and short on texture.

— Sasha Frere-Jones of The New Yorker on its success.

"Yeah!" received widespread acclaim from music critics, being lauded for its production. Jem Aswad of Entertainment Weekly called it "irresistibly crunked-out", adding, "the ensuing track glides smoothly between club-friendly hip-hop soul and ballads." Laura Sinagra of Rolling Stone commented that the song "creates sensual panic by combining Usher's jumpy attacks with Jon's sublime, frayed beats." Jon Caramanica of Blender noted that "Yeah!" is the first song to mix "mainstream R&B and menacing Southern crunk." Sal Cinquemani of Slant Magazine said that the song has brought Usher to a "whole new level of crunk." Andy Kellman of Allmusic described the song as a "crunk-meets-R&B foundation" which features an "instantly addictive eight-note keyboard vamp". He added that the song is "so absorbing that Ludacris' 1500th guest verse floats by with little notice." Matt Cibula of PopMatters characterized the song as a "full-fledged club über-crunk salacious" but he added that it fails to be a "club banger". Steve Jones of USA Today referred to "Yeah!" as a "club-rattling" song from a combination of "Atlanta's vibrant music scene", Lil Jon's "insistent beats" and Ludacris' "racy rhymes". Robert Hilburn of Los Angeles Times described "Yeah!" as a "raucous tale of dance-floor seduction" which Michael Jackson would have produced in 2004, if he "still had the old Thriller magic".

Usher himself also garnered praise for the song; Aswad called it the "grittiest song" Usher had sung and one that "reveals his newfound maturity". Caramanica said that it is "probably the scariest record – in a good way – he's ever made" and Usher "smartly shares the spotlight." Cibula stated that Usher's "smoove-ass" singing and Ludacris' presence contributes to the success of the single. "Yeah!" was nominated at the 47th Annual Grammy Awards for Record of the Year, and won the Best Rap/Sung Collaboration award. At the 2005 Soul Train Music Awards, "Yeah!" was nominated for best R&B/Soul or Rap Dance Cut.

"Yeah!" continues to be praised as one of Usher's finest songs. In 2016, Complex ranked the song number 11 on their list of the 25 greatest Usher songs, and in 2021, American Songwriter ranked the song number one on their list of the 10 greatest Usher songs.

== Commercial performance ==
"Yeah!" debuted on the US Billboard Hot 100 at number fifty-three on January 10, 2004, prior to its official release. On February 28, the song peaked atop the chart and stayed at that position for twelve consecutive weeks. "Yeah!" became Usher's fourth number-one single, Lil Jon's first and Ludacris' second. The single remained on the Hot 100 for forty-five weeks. "Yeah!" became the most played song in the United States in 2004, with Nielsen Broadcast Data Systems reporting the song getting a total of 496,805 plays. The commercial success of "Yeah!" and follow-up single "Burn" helped sustain Confessions atop the US Billboard 200 chart. The single was certified thirteen-times platinum by the Recording Industry Association of America (RIAA) on February 9, 2024, for shipping 13 million copies since its release. "Yeah!" became the best-performing single of 2004 in the United States. The single ranked at number 11 on the Billboard Hot 100 All-Time Top Songs, and second on the Hot 100 decade-end chart, behind Mariah Carey's "We Belong Together". By September 2013, the song had sold 4 million digital copies in the US.

Internationally, "Yeah!" received a similar response, topping several charts. In Australia, the song topped the chart on the week of April 4, 2004, for one week. It remained on it for only seven weeks before dropping out, and was certified 5× platinum by the Australian Recording Industry Association (ARIA) for selling 350,000 units. In New Zealand, "Yeah!" had a better chart performance, peaking at number one for four non-consecutive weeks. It remained on the chart for twenty-seven weeks before dropping and was certified two times platinum by the Recording Industry Association of New Zealand (RIANZ). In Switzerland and Austria, "Yeah!" peaked at number one and remained on the charts for thirty-eight and thirty-six weeks, respectively, and was certified gold in both countries. The song topped the charts in Denmark for three weeks, remaining on the chart for seventeen weeks. In Netherlands, "Yeah!" remained number one for four weeks, and in Norway for seven weeks. The song remained number one in Ireland and United Kingdom for two weeks, and number one for one week in France. In the United Kingdom, by March 4, 2010, "Yeah!" had sold 434,739 copies.

Compared to other countries, "Yeah!" underperformed in Finland, where it stayed on the charts for four weeks and peaked at number seventeen, and Spain where it peaked at number thirteen. The song did not top the charts in Italy and Sweden, where it peaked at number three and four respectively, and in Belgium (Flanders) and Hungary, where it charted at number two. Overall, the single remained on several charts worldwide for one year, from early 2004 to 2005. On the 2004 year-end charts, "Yeah!" became the twenty-eighth best-selling single in Australia, and twenty-sixth in France. It peaked in the top-ten on the year-end charts in Austria, Belgium (Flanders), Belgium (Wallonia), Netherlands, Ireland, Switzerland and the United Kingdom.

=== Accolades ===
Year-end lists for "Yeah!"
Publication	Accolade	Rank	Ref.
Time Magazine	Best Songs of 2004	1	
MTV	Most Played Song of 2004	1	
Pitchfork	Top 50 Singles of 2004	19	
Pitchfork	The 200 Best Songs of the 2000s	175	
Complex	The 100 Best Songs of The Complex Decade	45	
Pop Sugar	30 of the Hottest Songs From the Early '00s	5	
VH1	100 Greatest Songs of The'00s	27	
Soul in Stereo	100 Best R&B Songs Of The 2000s	32	
Billboard	The Top 20 Billboard Hot 100 Hits of the 2000s	2	
Rolling Stone	Top 500 Greatest Songs of All Time	290	

== Music video ==
=== Background ===
Mr. X, formerly Little X, had previously directed videos for Usher's singles "U Don't Have to Call" and "U Got It Bad". Mr. X said that the song reminded him of laser beams. Usher and Mr. X combined ideas to create a dance video for "Yeah!". The development was handled by how Usher wanted to be portrayed in the video, particularly showcasing his dance moves. The music video was filmed in a vacant art gallery in Los Angeles over two days. When the shooting started, Mr. X recalled Michael Jackson's "low-tech" and "laser-flashing" 1979 "Rock with You" video, and used it as a reference. Forty extra people were commissioned to dance with Usher, and two ladies to tempt him in different scenes. They went through photo browsing and phone calling, opting for Destiny Lightsy, a friend of Mr. X, who seduces Usher in the club in a Marilyn Monroe wardrobe to complement the lyrics. Canadian model Melyssa Ford, who was discovered by Mr. X, is portrayed as Usher's second seductress. Lil Jon acted as an assistant director during the sessions. Usher took charge of his ideas on his wardrobe and choreography, with additional routines, specifically the Rockaway and the Thunderclap, which Mr. X learned from Jamaica. The Rockaway influenced Fat Joe and Terror Squad's "Lean Back" video.

=== Synopsis and reception ===
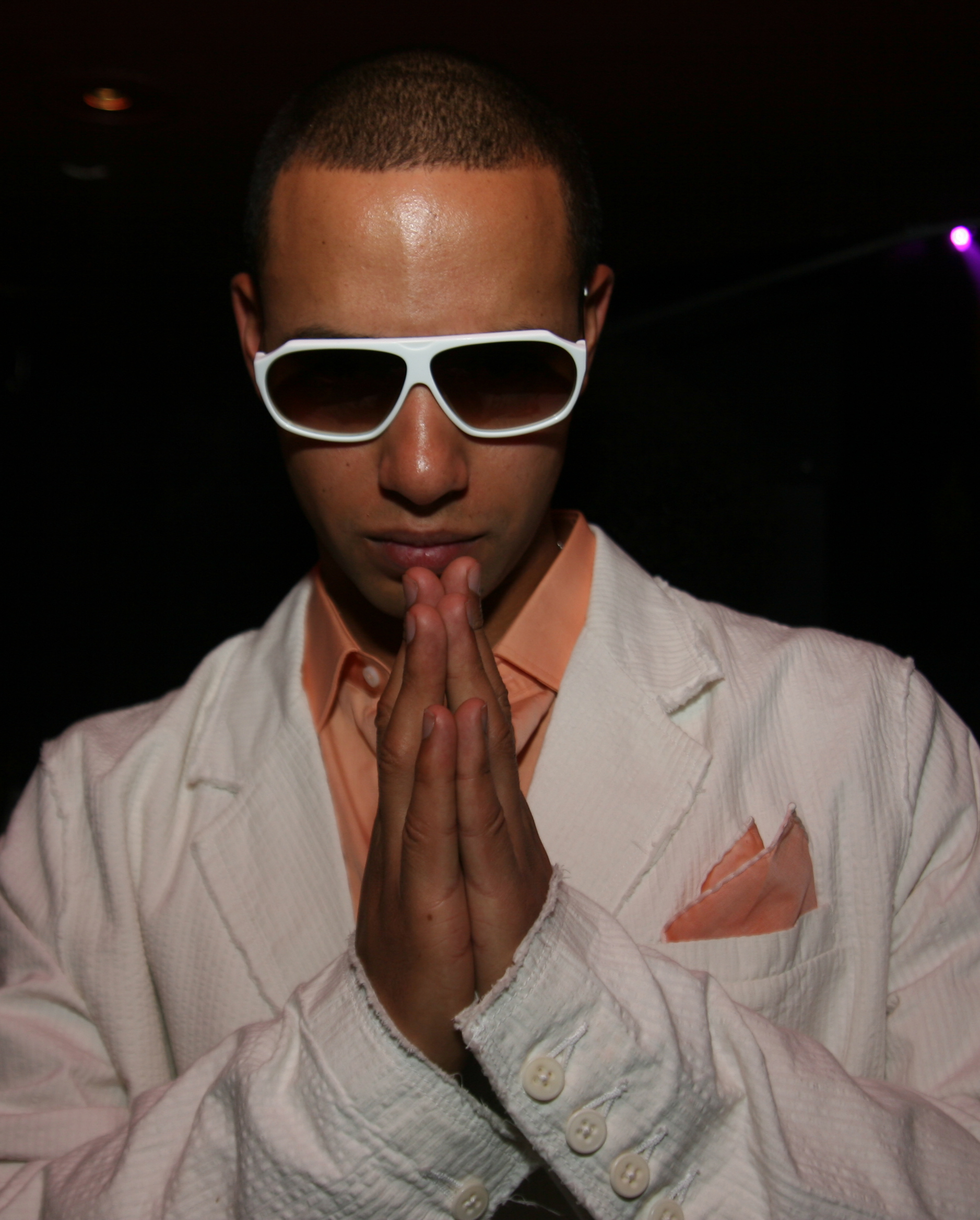
Canadian director Mr. X directed the video for "Yeah!"

The video begins with Usher entering a club, and in another scene dancing in front of blue lasers; the video alternates between both the club and laser scenes throughout. In the former setting, Usher is sat down when a woman—portrayed by Destiny, video producer Mr. X's friend—approaches him and attempts to seduce him. The woman stands up and walks to the dance-floor, telling Usher to "come get me" and "baby let's go", in sync with the song. Usher goes and dances with her during the chorus. In the beginning of the second verse, the laser scene with Usher dancing now shows both blue and green lasers. Usher and the woman are still dancing, with the woman further attempting to seduce him.

In the second chorus, Usher performs choreography in the club, backed up by several male dancers. Female dancers then come in, performing choreography along with Usher and the male dancers. After Lil Jon sprays champagne towards the camera in the laser scene, Ludacris performs his verse. He is dancing in both the club and laser scene, with the camera also alternating to female's dancing in sync in the club.

In the final chorus, Usher again performs choreography in the club, with another scene in the latter setting this time showing a different seductress, portrayed by model Melyssa Ford, walking away telling him to follow her. While following her, he is in a hallway, with the women then pulling Usher in a room, where they begin to romance. While Ludacris says his final verse, rapper Chingy, Jazze Pha and P. Diddy's former assistant, Fonzworth Bentley, both make appearances with Bentley holding a violin. Lil Jon says his final verse, not present in the track version of "Yeah!", where he repeats numerous dance moves including the Rockaway and Thunderclap, with Usher performing them. The video ends with Lil Jon repeating "rock away" and then "cut".

At the 2004 MTV Video Music Awards, Usher won his first 2 awards with Best Dance Video and Best Male Video. At the 2005 Soul Train Music Awards, the video was nominated for the Michael Jackson Award for Best R&B/Soul or Rap Music Video.

The music video on YouTube has received over 1.16 billion views as of October 2025.

== Track listings ==
Digital download
No.	Title	Writer(s)	Producer(s)	Length
1.	"Yeah!"	Christopher Bridges; James Phillips; Jonathan Smith; LaMarquis Jefferson; Patrick Smith; Sean Garrett	Lil Jon; Garrett^{[a]}	4:10

EP/UK CD 2
No.	Title	Writer(s)	Producer(s)	Length
1.	"Yeah!"	Bridges; Phillips; Smith; Jefferson; Smith; Garrett	Lil Jon; Garrett^{[a]}	4:13
2.	"Red Light"	Smith; Garrett; Smith; Keri Hilson; Robert McDowel	Lil Jon; Garrett^{[a]}	6:02
3.	"Sweet Lies"	Pharrell Williams; Chad Hugo	The Neptunes	4:07
4.	"Yeah!"	Bridges; Phillips; Smith; Jefferson; Smith; Garrett	Lil Jon; Garrett^{[a]}	4:12

UK CD 1
No.	Title	Writer(s)	Producer(s)	Length
1.	"Yeah!"	Bridges; Phillips; Smith; Jefferson; Smith; Garrett	Lil Jon; Garrett^{[a]}	4:13
2.	"Red Light"	Smith; Garrett; Smith; Hilson; McDowel	Lil Jon; Garrett^{[a]}	6:02

Notes

- ^{^[a]} signifies a vocal producer

== Charts ==
=== Weekly charts ===
2004 weekly chart performance for "Yeah!"
Chart (2004)	Peak position
Australia (ARIA)	1
Australian Urban (ARIA)	1
Austria (Ö3 Austria Top 40)	1
Belgium (Ultratop 50 Flanders)	2
Belgium (Ultratop 50 Wallonia)	1
Canada (Nielsen SoundScan)	1
Canada CHR/Pop Top 30 (Radio & Records)	1
CIS Airplay (TopHit)	163
Croatia International Airplay (HRT)	6
Czech Republic (IFPI)	8
Denmark (Tracklisten)	1
Europe (Eurochart Hot 100)	1
Finland (Suomen virallinen lista)	17
France (SNEP)	1
Germany (GfK)	1
Greece (IFPI)	6
Hungary (Single Top 40)	2
Hungary (Dance Top 40)	1
Ireland (IRMA)	1
Italy (FIMI)	3
Netherlands (Dutch Top 40)	1
Netherlands (Single Top 100)	1
New Zealand (Recorded Music NZ)	1
Norway (VG-lista)	1
Poland (Polish Singles Chart)	30
Romania (Romanian Top 100)	5
Scottish Singles Sales (Official Charts)	2
Spain (Promusicae)	13
Sweden (Sverigetopplistan)	4
Switzerland (Schweizer Hitparade)	1
UK Singles (Official Charts)	1
UK Hip Hop/R&B (Official Charts)	1
US Billboard Hot 100	1
US Hot R&B/Hip-Hop Songs (Billboard)	1
US Pop Airplay (Billboard)	1
US Rhythmic Airplay (Billboard)	1

2024–2025 weekly chart performance for "Yeah!"
Chart (2024–2025)	Peak position
Canada Hot 100 (Billboard)	20
Global 200 (Billboard)	32
Romania Airplay (TopHit)	96
UK Downloads (OCC)	35
US Billboard Hot 100	20

=== Year-end charts ===
Year-end chart performance for "Yeah!"
Chart (2004)	Position
Australia (ARIA)	28
Austria (Ö3 Austria Top 40)	7
Belgium (Ultratop 50 Flanders)	10
Belgium (Ultratop 40 Wallonia)	5
Europe (Eurochart Hot 100 Singles)	4
France (SNEP)	26
Germany (Media Control GfK)	3
Ireland (IRMA)	8
Italy (FIMI)	6
Netherlands (Dutch Top 40)	10
Netherlands (Single Top 100)	13
New Zealand (RIANZ)	2
Sweden (Hitlistan)	12
Switzerland (Schweizer Hitparade)	4
UK Singles (OCC)	5
UK Urban (Music Week)	1
US Billboard Hot 100	1
US Hot R&B/Hip-Hop Singles & Tracks (Billboard)	2
US Rhythmic Top 40 (Billboard)	1

=== Decade-end charts ===
Decade-end chart performance for "Yeah!"
Charts (2000–2009)	Position
Germany (Official German Charts)	70
US Billboard Hot 100	2

=== Centurial charts ===
Centurial chart performance for "Yeah!"
Chart	Position
US Billboard Hot 100 21st century	11

=== All-time charts ===
All-time chart performance for "Yeah!"
Chart	Position
US Billboard Hot 100	17
US Pop Airplay (Billboard)	36

== Certifications ==
Certifications for "Yeah!"
Region	Certification	Certified units/sales
Australia (ARIA)	9× Platinum	630,000^{‡}
Austria (IFPI Austria)	Gold	15,000^{*}
Belgium (BRMA)	Platinum	50,000^{*}
Canada (Music Canada) Physical sales	Platinum	10,000^{^}
Canada (Music Canada) Digital sales + streaming	Diamond	800,000^{‡}
Denmark (IFPI Danmark)	2× Platinum	180,000^{‡}
Germany (BVMI)	5× Gold	1,500,000^{‡}
Italy (FIMI)	Platinum	70,000^{‡}
Japan (RIAJ)	Gold	100,000^{*}
New Zealand (RMNZ)	7× Platinum	210,000^{‡}
Norway (IFPI Norway)	Platinum	10,000^{*}
Spain (Promusicae)	Platinum	60,000^{‡}
Sweden (GLF)	Gold	10,000^{^}
Switzerland (IFPI Switzerland)	Gold	20,000^{^}
United Kingdom (BPI)	4× Platinum	2,400,000^{‡}
United States (RIAA)	13× Platinum	13,000,000^{‡}
^{*} Sales figures based on certification alone.^{^} Shipments figures based on certification alone.^{‡} Sales+streaming figures based on certification alone.

== Release history ==
Release dates and format(s) for "Yeah!"
Region	Date	Format(s)	Label(s)	Ref.
United States	February 7, 2004	Contemporary hit radio	LaFace	

== See also ==
- List of best-selling singles
- List of number-one singles of 2004 (Australia)
- List of number-one hits of 2004 (Austria)
- List of Ultratop 40 number-one singles of 2004
- List of number-one songs of the 2000s (Denmark)
- List of European number-one hits of 2004
- List of number-one hits of 2004 (France)
- List of number-one hits of 2004 (Germany)
- List of number-one singles of 2004 (Ireland)
- List of Dutch Top 40 number-one singles of 2004
- List of number-one singles from the 2000s (New Zealand)
- List of number-one songs in Norway
- List of number-one hits of 2004 (Switzerland)
- List of UK Singles Chart number ones of the 2000s
- List of Hot 100 number-one singles of 2004 (U.S.)
- List of number-one R&B singles of 2004 (U.S.)
- List of Mainstream Top 40 number-one hits of 2004 (U.S.)
