= List of number-one hits of 2004 (Germany) =

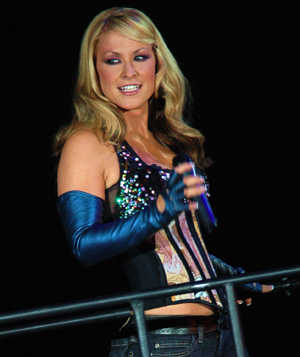
O-Zone's "Dragostea Din Tei" became the best-performing single of 2004, while Anastacia's (pictured) eponymous album became the best-performing album of the year.

This is a list of songs which reached number one on the German Media Control Top100 Singles Chart in 2004.

== Number-one hits by week ==
This is a list of the German Media Control Top100 Singles Chart number-ones of 2004.

Key
†	Indicates best-performing single and album of 2004

Issue date	Song	Artist	Ref.	Album	Artist	Ref.
5 January	"Shut Up"	The Black Eyed Peas		Live Summer 2003	Robbie Williams	
12 January	"Shut Up"	The Black Eyed Peas		Live Summer 2003	Robbie Williams	
19 January	"Shut Up"	The Black Eyed Peas		Live Summer 2003	Robbie Williams	
26 January	"Du hast mein Herz gebrochen"	Yvonne Catterfeld		Dick This!	Dick Brave & The Backbeats	
2 February	"Shut Up"	The Black Eyed Peas		Für alle	Laith Al-Deen	
9 February	"Augen auf!"	Oomph!		Dick This!	Dick Brave & The Backbeats	
16 February	"Augen auf!"	Oomph!		Dick This!	Dick Brave & The Backbeats	
23 February	"Augen auf!"	Oomph!		Feels Like Home	Norah Jones	
1 March	"Augen auf!"	Oomph!		Feels Like Home	Norah Jones	
8 March	"Augen auf!"	Oomph!		Feels Like Home	Norah Jones	
15 March	"Just One Last Dance"	Sarah Connor featuring Natural		Feels Like Home	Norah Jones	
22 March	"Can't Wait Until Tonight"	Max		Feels Like Home	Norah Jones	
29 March	"Can't Wait Until Tonight"	Max		Patience	George Michael	
5 April	"Can't Wait Until Tonight"	Max		Herz	Rosenstolz	
12 April	"Yeah!"	Usher featuring Ludacris and Lil' Jon		Anastacia†	Anastacia	
19 April	"Yeah!"	Usher featuring Ludacris and Lil' Jon		Anastacia†	Anastacia	
26 April	"Yeah!"	Usher featuring Ludacris and Lil' Jon		Anastacia†	Anastacia	
3 May	"Yeah!"	Usher featuring Ludacris and Lil' Jon		Anastacia†	Anastacia	
10 May	"I Don't Wanna Know"	Mario Winans featuring Diddy and Enya		Anastacia†	Anastacia	
17 May	"Fuck It (I Don't Want You Back)"	Eamon		Anastacia†	Anastacia	
24 May	"Fuck It (I Don't Want You Back)"	Eamon		Anastacia†	Anastacia	
31 May	"Fuck It (I Don't Want You Back)"	Eamon		So-Called Chaos	Alanis Morissette	
7 June	"Dragostea Din Tei" †	O-Zone		Under My Skin	Avril Lavigne	
14 June	"Dragostea Din Tei" †	O-Zone		Under My Skin	Avril Lavigne	
21 June	"Dragostea Din Tei" †	O-Zone		Once	Nightwish	
28 June	"Dragostea Din Tei" †	O-Zone		Noiz	Söhne Mannheims	
5 July	"Dragostea Din Tei" †	O-Zone		Once	Nightwish	
12 July	"Dragostea Din Tei" †	O-Zone		Noiz	Söhne Mannheims	
19 July	"Dragostea Din Tei" †	O-Zone		Du	Andrea Berg	
26 July	"Dragostea Din Tei" †	O-Zone		Here I Am	Alexander	
2 August	"Dragostea Din Tei" †	O-Zone		Anastacia†	Anastacia	
9 August	"Dragostea Din Tei" †	O-Zone		Adios	Böhse Onkelz	
16 August	"Dragostea Din Tei" †	O-Zone		Adios	Böhse Onkelz	
23 August	"Dragostea Din Tei" †	O-Zone		Adios	Böhse Onkelz	
30 August	"Dragostea Din Tei" †	O-Zone		Anastacia†	Anastacia	
6 September	"Dragostea Din Tei" †	O-Zone		Die Band, die sie Pferd nannten	Die Ärzte	
13 September	"Obsesión"	Aventura		Confidence	Gentleman	
20 September	"Obsesión"	Aventura		Confidence	Gentleman	
27 September	"Obsesión"	Aventura		Max Herre	Max Herre	
4 October	"Obsesión"	Aventura		Room Service	Bryan Adams	
11 October	"Obsesión"	Aventura		Reise, Reise	Rammstein	
18 October	"Obsesión"	Aventura		Around the Sun	R.E.M.	
25 October	"Obsesión"	Aventura		Zurück zum Glück	Die Toten Hosen	
1 November	"Call on Me"	Eric Prydz		Greatest Hits	Robbie Williams	
8 November	"Call on Me"	Eric Prydz		Greatest Hits	Robbie Williams	
15 November	"Call on Me"	Eric Prydz		Greatest Hits	Robbie Williams	
22 November	"Call on Me"	Eric Prydz		Greatest Hits	Robbie Williams	
29 November	"Call on Me"	Eric Prydz		Encore	Eminem	
6 December	"Call on Me"	Eric Prydz		How To Dismantle An Atomic Bomb	U2	
13 December	"Living to Love You"	Sarah Connor		Greatest Hits	Robbie Williams	
20 December	"Living to Love You"	Sarah Connor		Greatest Hits	Robbie Williams	
27 December	"Sweetest Poison"	Nu Pagadi		Greatest Hits	Robbie Williams	

== See also ==
- List of number-one hits (Germany)
- List of German airplay number-one songs
