= List of number-one singles of 2004 (Ireland) =

The following is a list of the IRMA's number-one singles of 2004.

Issue date	Song	Artist	ref
1 January	"Leave Right Now"	Will Young	
8 January	"Leave Right Now"	Will Young	
15 January	"Leave Right Now"	Will Young	
22 January	"Leave Right Now"	Will Young	
29 January	"Milkshake"	Kelis	
5 February	"Milkshake"	Kelis	
12 February	"Milkshake"	Kelis	
19 February	"Milkshake"	Kelis	
26 February	"Milkshake"	Kelis	
4 March	"Toxic"	Britney Spears	
11 March	"Toxic"	Britney Spears	
18 March	"Toxic"	Britney Spears	
25 March	"Toxic"	Britney Spears	
1 April	"Yeah!"	Usher featuring Lil Jon and Ludacris	
8 April	"Yeah!"	Usher featuring Lil Jon and Ludacris	
15 April	"Fuck It (I Don't Want You Back)"	Eamon	
22 April	"Fuck It (I Don't Want You Back)"	Eamon	
29 April	"If My World Stopped Turning"	Chris Doran	
6 May	"If My World Stopped Turning"	Chris Doran	
13 May	"Fuck It (I Don't Want You Back)"	Eamon	
20 May	"The Langer"	Tim O'Riordan and Natural Gas	
27 May	"The Langer"	Tim O'Riordan and Natural Gas	
3 June	"The Langer"	Tim O'Riordan and Natural Gas	
10 June	"The Langer"	Tim O'Riordan and Natural Gas	
17 June	"Everytime"	Britney Spears	
24 June	"Everytime"	Britney Spears	
1 July	"Everytime"	Britney Spears	
8 July	"Everytime"	Britney Spears	
15 July	"Everytime"	Britney Spears	
22 July	"Dry Your Eyes"	The Streets	
29 July	"Dry Your Eyes"	The Streets	
5 August	"Dry Your Eyes"	The Streets	
12 August	"Dragostea din tei"	O-Zone	
19 August	"These Words"	Natasha Bedingfield	
26 August	"These Words"	Natasha Bedingfield	
2 September	"These Words"	Natasha Bedingfield	
9 September	"Real to Me"	Brian McFadden	
16 September	"Real to Me"	Brian McFadden	
23 September	"Real to Me"	Brian McFadden	
30 September	"Real to Me"	Brian McFadden	
7 October	"Call on Me"	Eric Prydz	
14 October	"Call on Me"	Eric Prydz	
21 October	"Call on Me"	Eric Prydz	
28 October	"Call on Me"	Eric Prydz	
4 November	"My Prerogative"	Britney Spears	
11 November	"Vertigo"	U2	
18 November	"Lose My Breath"	Destiny's Child	
25 November	"Lose My Breath"	Destiny's Child	
2 December	"Do They Know It's Christmas?"	Band Aid 20	
9 December	"Do They Know It's Christmas?"	Band Aid 20	
16 December	"Do They Know It's Christmas?"	Band Aid 20	
23 December	"Do They Know It's Christmas?"	Band Aid 20	
30 December	"Do They Know It's Christmas?"	Band Aid 20	

== See also ==
- 2004 in music
- List of artists who reached number one in Ireland
