= Label 73 =

Label 73 was a subsidiary of TIME, specializing in dance and house music and was founded by Giacomo Maiolini in mid-2004.

After being inaugurated, the Italian label held the single "Sorry Marin": first release of Label 73, but the last song solo-Magic Box

Rossano Prini left the label Spy Records to work with A&R in Label 73, after a proposal made by Maiolini.

Magic Box, DJ Ross and Double You was the artists who participated in Label 73.

Among eight entries of Label 73: six were on LP and CD in just two, and distribute music from foreign artists such as Beats And Styles and EliZe.

In 2006, the song "Beat Goes On", DJ Ross & Double You, was the last release of Label 73, to the record company had closed its doors the same year.

== Label 73 artists ==
- Beats And Styles feat. MC Scholar & Milla (only in Italy)
- Blue Led
- DJ Ross vs. Double You
- EliZe (only in Italy)
- Magic Box
- The House Groovers
