= Gille (singer) =

Japanese singer (born 1987)

Gille ジル
- Also known as: TASHA gee
- Born: January 4, 1987 (age 39); Saito, Miyazaki Prefecture
- Occupation: Singer
- Instrument: Vocals
- Years active: 2011–present
- Labels: Gakuon U.F. (2011–2012); Universal J (2012–present)
- Website: www.universal-music.co.jp/gille/

Gille (ジル, Jiru; born January 4, 1987), stylized GILLE, is a Japanese singer originally from Saito, Miyazaki. She made her major debut in 2012, but had previously performed under the name TASHA gee. Gille made a name for herself by releasing videos of herself singing English language covers of Japanese pop songs on her YouTube channel appearing only in silhouette, including some English songs such as "Rolling in the Deep", featured on her debut EP Lead the Way. In June 2012, she released an English cover of AKB48's "Flying Get", and the group's creator Yasushi Akimoto remarked that Gille had a "diamond voice" and fully approved the cover. Gille made her debut with the album I AM GILLE. in July 2012, which eventually became certified as gold. Her debut single "Girls / Winter Dream" was released that October, and was noted to sample O-Zone's "Dragostea Din Tei". This was followed up by the single "Try Again" in January 2013 and the album GILLEsound Vol. 1.

== Discography ==
=== As TASHA gee ===
Singles

- "WILL" – July 24, 2011
- "Hanabira" (花びら; "Bouquet") – May 30, 2012

=== As GILLE ===
EPs

- Lead the Way – May 16, 2012

Albums

- I AM GILLE. – July 18, 2012
- I AM GILLE. -Special Edition- – September 26, 2012
- GILLEsound Vol.1 – March 6, 2013
- I AM GILLE. 2 – September 4, 2013
- I AM GILLE. -Best Selection +- – January 15, 2014
- REAL - March 2, 2016

Singles

- "GIRLS / Winter Dream" – October 24, 2012
- "Try Again" – January 30, 2013
- "HIKARI" – August 21, 2013

Digital singles

- "Shunkashūtō (English Ver.)" (春夏秋冬; originally by Hilcrhyme) – April 18, 2012
- "Yasashiku Naritai (English Ver.)" (やさしくなりたい; originally by Kazuyoshi Saito) – May 16, 2012
- "Party Rock Anthem feat. Steve Jay" (originally by LMFAO) – June 6, 2012
- "Koibumi ~Love Letter~ (English Ver.)" (恋文～ラブレター～, Koibumi ~Raburetā~; originally by Greeeen) – June 6, 2012
- "Flying Get (English Ver.)" (フライングゲット, Furaingu Getto; originally by AKB48) – June 27, 2012
- "Sakura (Dokushō) (English Ver.)" (さくら（独唱）; originally by Naotarō Moriyama) – February 20, 2013
- "Ikuze! Kaitō Shōjo (English Ver.)" (行くぜっ!怪盗少女; originally by Momoiro Clover) – July 24, 2013
- "Memeshikute (English Ver.)" (女々しくて; originally by Golden Bomber) – August 14, 2013
- "Smile Again" – October 9, 2013
