= List of number-one hits of 2004 (Austria) =

This is a list of the Austrian Singles Chart number-one hits of 2004.

Issue date	Song	Artist
4 January	"Mama (Ana Ahabak)"	Christina Stürmer
11 January	"Mama (Ana Ahabak)"	Christina Stürmer
18 January	"Mama (Ana Ahabak)"	Christina Stürmer
25 January	"Shut Up"	The Black Eyed Peas
1 February	"Shut Up"	The Black Eyed Peas
8 February	"Shut Up"	The Black Eyed Peas
15 February	"Shut Up"	The Black Eyed Peas
22 February	"Augen auf!"	Oomph!
29 February	"Addiction"	Verena Pötzl
7 March	"Augen auf!"	Oomph!
14 March	"Augen auf!"	Oomph!
21 March	"Augen auf!"	Oomph!
28 March	"Left Outside Alone"	Anastacia
4 April	"Left Outside Alone"	Anastacia
11 April	"Left Outside Alone"	Anastacia
18 April	"Left Outside Alone"	Anastacia
25 April	"Left Outside Alone"	Anastacia
2 May	"Yeah!"	Usher
9 May	"Dragostea Din Tei"	Haiducii
16 May	"Vorbei"	Christina Stürmer
23 May	"Fuck It (I Don't Want You Back)"	Eamon
30 May	"Fuck It (I Don't Want You Back)"	Eamon
6 June	"Fuck It (I Don't Want You Back)"	Eamon
13 June	"Fuck It (I Don't Want You Back)"	Eamon
20 June	"Dragostea Din Tei"	O-Zone
27 June	"Dragostea Din Tei"	O-Zone
4 July	"Dragostea Din Tei"	O-Zone
11 July	"Dragostea Din Tei"	O-Zone
18 July	"Dragostea Din Tei"	O-Zone
25 July	"Dragostea Din Tei"	O-Zone
1 August	"Dragostea Din Tei"	O-Zone
8 August	"Dragostea Din Tei"	O-Zone
15 August	"Dragostea Din Tei"	O-Zone
22 August	"Dragostea Din Tei"	O-Zone
29 August	"Dragostea Din Tei"	O-Zone
5 September	"Dragostea Din Tei"	O-Zone
12 September	"Dragostea Din Tei"	O-Zone
19 September	"Obsesión"	Aventura
26 September	"Obsesión"	Aventura
3 October	"Obsesión"	Aventura
10 October	"Obsesión"	Aventura
17 October	"Obsesión"	Aventura
24 October	"Obsesión"	Aventura
31 October	"Obsesión"	Aventura
7 November	"Obsesión"	Aventura
14 November	"Call on Me"	Eric Prydz
21 November	"Call on Me"	Eric Prydz
28 November	"Call on Me"	Eric Prydz
5 December	"Call on Me"	Eric Prydz
12 December	"Call on Me"	Eric Prydz
19 December	"Call on Me"	Eric Prydz
26 December	"Sweetest Poison"	Nu Pagadi

== See also ==
- 2004 in music
