= Nicholis Louw =

South African singer (born 1978)

Nicholis Louw (born 30 December 1978) is a South African pop and opera singer. His repertoire, mainly in Afrikaans, includes rock, pop, country and music ballads, often incorporating strong classical elements.

Louw has had a number of successful albums through releases through Select Music starting with his debut album in 2003, selling over 650,000 albums. His major hits include "Ek wil my baby hê vanaand", "Rock daai lyfie" and "Generaal". He tours extensively averaging above 100 performances a year. Louw is signed to Select Music, the major South African record label.

On 12 July 2014, he married Denise Shrewsbury.

== Discography ==
=== Albums ===
- 2003: My Hart Is Aan Die Brand
- 2005: Rock Daai Lyfie
- 2007: Hier Naby Jou
- 2008: Vergeet en Vergewe
- 2008: Elvis On My Mind
- 2009: Energie
- 2011: Ek Is Daar Vir Jou
- 2012: Gebed Van 'n Sondaar
- 2014: So Rock Ons Die Wêreld Reg

DVDs

- 2006: Rock Daai Lyfie
- 2009: Intiem Met... Nicholis Louw

=== Singles ===
(Selective)

- 2007: "Hier naby jou"
- 2008: "Vergeet en Vergewe"
- 2009: "Welkom by my party"
- 2009: "Hoe ver sal jy gaan"
- 2009: "Generaal"
- 2009: "Ek wil my baby he vanaand"
- 2010: "Nommer asseblief"
- 2010: "Water jou mond"
- 2011: "Ek is daar vir jou"
- 2010: "Emmers vol liefde"
- 2012: "Net 'n Mens"
- 2014: "Bring die storm"
