= Denny Tsettos =

- Also known as: The Destroyer; The Terminator; Super DJ
- Origin: New Jersey; New York City
- Genres: Club, House, Progressive house, Tech house, Tribal house, Vocal house
- Occupations: DJ, Producer, Remixer
- Labels: Metropolitan; Logic; BMG; Dee Vee Music; Ultra; Gossip
- Website: www.dennytsettosmusic.com

Denny Tsettos, is an American club/house DJ, producer and remixer. He had mixshows on WKTU and Sirius Satellite Radio Area channel 33.

== Discography ==
Albums/Mixed compilations
Year	Title	Label
1999	Welcome to the Underground, Vol. 1	Metropolitan Records
2000	Welcome to the Underground, Vol. 2	Metropolitan Records
2000	The Beat of America, Vol. 1	Logic Records/BMG
2004	Live at Temptations: Summer 2004	Dee Vee Music
2004	Club Anthems, Vol. 1	Ultra Records
2006	Club Essentials, Vol. 1	Gossip Records
2007	Club Essentials, Vol. 2	Gossip Records

=== Remixography ===
- "Me and You" - Alexia
- "Number One" - Alexia
- "Until We Meet Again" - Aria
- "Love on Top" - Beyoncé
- "Honey" - Billy Ray Martin
- "Keep Pushin'" - Booom!
- "Turn It Up" - Brandy
- "Afrodisiac" - Brandy
- "Where Ever You Are" - Bryan Todd
- "Let The Love Go On" - Candy Club
- "Angel" - The Corrs
- "I Never Said" - Cynthia
- "Something Happened on the Way to Heaven" - Deborah Cox
- "That Look" - De'Lacy
- "I Can't Wait" - Dianne Wesley
- "I Believe" - Georgie Porgie
- "Angel" - Joée
- "How Can I Be Falling - Jennifer Green
- "Señorita" - Justin Timberlake
- "Jealousy" - Kim Sanders
- "You Won't Forget Me" - La Bouche
- "Here We Go Again" - Layla
- "Don't Go" - Le Click
- "I Still Love You" - Lil Suzy
- "Rejoice" - Michelle Weeks
- "I Want You Back" - 'N SYNC
- "Got To Believe" - Pulse 81
- "Breakin' Dishes" - Rihanna
- "Where Have You Been" - Rihanna
- "Don't Go Lose It Baby" - Rozalla
- "DJ Love Song" - Shyra Sánchez
- "Believe It" - Spencer & Hill
- "Wouldnit" - Yoko Ono
