= Spy Records (Italy) =

Italian record label

- Parent company: Time Group
- Founded: 1999
- Founder: Giacomo Maiolini
- Status: Inactive in 2005
- Genre: Electronic music Italo dance House music
- Country of origin: Italy
- Location: Brescia, Italy

Spy Records was Italian record label, specializing in Italo dance and Eurodance, and owned by TIME Group. It was founded by Giacomo Maiolini in 1999. Spy label rose as department of Time Records, after the death of Italian Style Production.

== History ==
After founding the record label, Maiolini handed Spy Records to Rossano Prini at the midst of 1999. After that, Prini began to select established artists to musical repertoire and contracted the Tristano and Erika De Bonis brothers and DJs, in order to work in his recording.

In 2004, Prini left Spy Records to work in Label 73 and, in 2005, the record label closed.

== Spy Records artists ==
- Dave Leatherman
- DJ Ross
- E. Magic
- Erika
- Magic Box
