= Rod Carrillo =

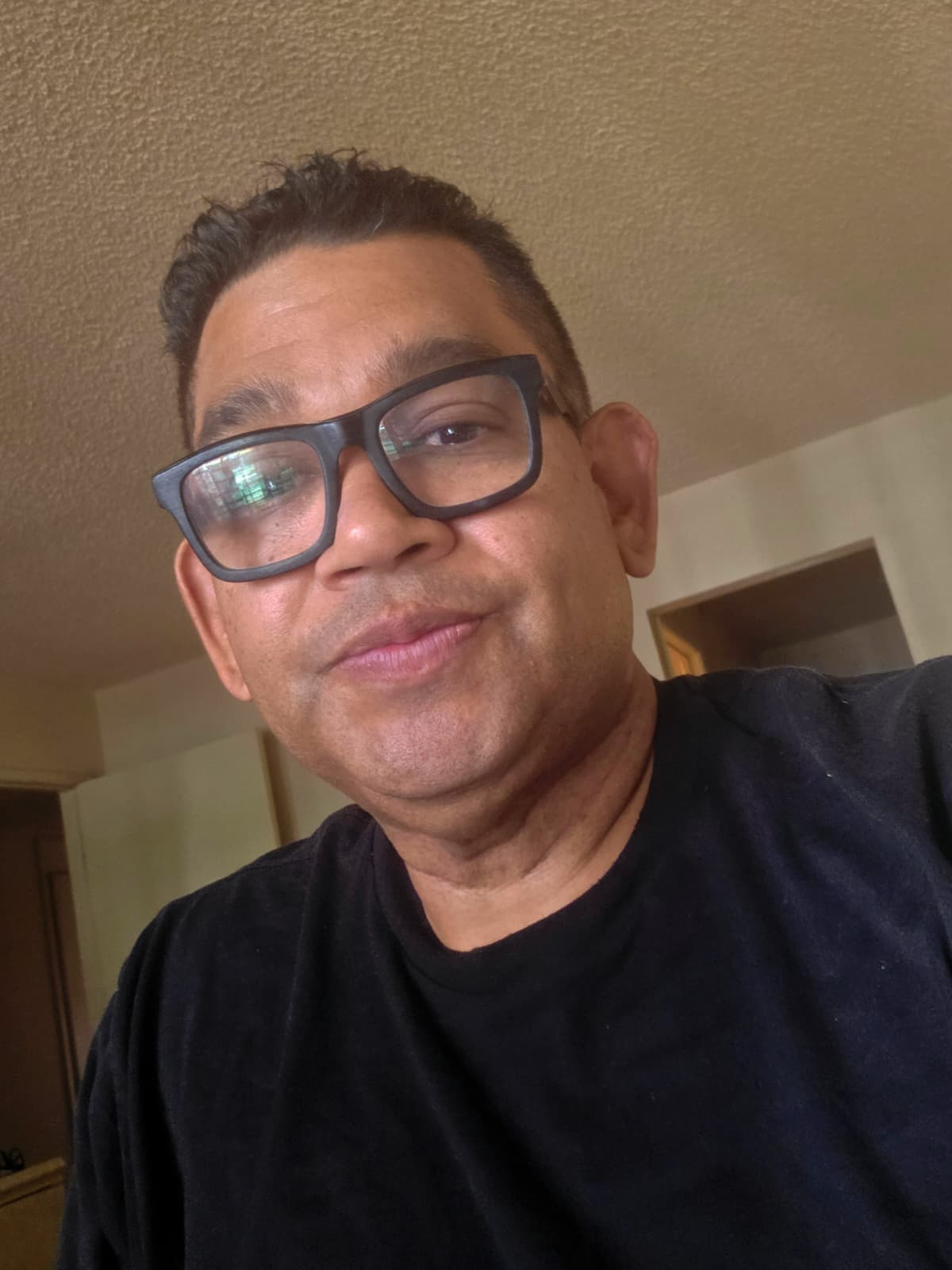
- Rod Carrillo in Madrid, Spain 2026

Background information
- Also known as: Carrillo & Amador; Carrillo & Williams; House-a-Holics; Rod Carrillo and Ronnie Sumrall; Big Chief C Attorney Client Privilege; Kario; Rod Carrillo & Shefali; Carvelo with Julissa Veloz
- Origin: United States, Republic of Panama
- Genres: Electronic dance music, House music, Funky house, Electro house
- Occupations: Record Producer; DJ; Label Executive; Talent Development
- Years active: 1995–present
- Label: Carrillo music
- Website: www.rodcarrillo.net

Rod Carrillo is a Panamanian electronic dance music record producer and the CEO of Carrillo Music. Originally from the Republic of Panama, Carrillo specializes in dance music with a strong Latin influence.

He founded Carrillo Music in 2007 and has worked consistently as a remixer, DJ, and producer throughout his career. He has also been integral in developing artistic careers.

== Career ==
Rod Carrillo discovered his passion for music when working as a DJ at just 15 years of age. After he got the ball rolling in his DJ career, everything snowballed. He regularly worked the nightclub circuit and played various sets on local radio stations. He also performed at corporate events while attending law school.

He also regularly collaborates with a diverse array of artists. He has worked with Ralphi Rosario, Eddie Amador, Danny Howard, Futuristic Polar Bears, Terri B!, Rosabel and Eric Redd, Warp Brothers, D.O.N.S., Kissy Sell Out and the late Ron Carroll among many others.

Rod Carrillo and Ronnie Sumrall founded house music duo and have been producing and writing music together since 2007, after they met in Los Angeles. They released a full-length album in 2010 entitled Rhythm after the success of their previous singles. They are perhaps best known for their songs: "Moonshine Rising", "Long Time" and "Breakin' Out".

In 2019, he worked with Ralphi Rosario and Abel Aguilera executive producing and spearheading the duo's first studio album under their alias Rosabel. Rosabel's studio project was named The Album. Rosabel's 14 song album featured singers Jeanie Tracy, Terri Bjerre and Tamara Wallace. The Album was released in April 2019 to positive reviews and chart success. Upon its release, The Album ranked in the top 10 Billboard Dance/Electronic Sales in United States. Shortly after, Rosabel announced shortly after a tour in support for their new music. In May 2019, artist Eric Redd released his single "Push", which was produced by Carrillo. The collaboration with Eric Redd garnished overwhelming success from the House Music community. "Push" earned positions in the Top 20 Soulful House Sales Chart, Top 100 Overall Sales Chart on the music download site Traxsource.com. "Push" was chosen as Weekend Weapon Pick and as a pick for Traxsource.com's Essential House Playlist.

Carrillo released his second studio album, Los Sonidos, in 2019. The 10 song album includes collaborations with Terri Bjerre, Hoxton Whores, Ralphi Rosario, Lisa Williams, Kid.a, Claras "Beefy" Brown, Eric Redd and Reiss Harrison.

Los Sonidos was produced and composed while Carrillo was in between projects in England, Panama, Canada and Spain in 2018/early 2019.

The project was kept the project under wraps up to the time of release by Carrillo and his collaborators.

Upon its release, Los Sonidos received very favorable reviews from Electronic Music publications and blogs.

The first single from Los Sonidos was "You Got What I Need" which is a collaboration between Carrillo and vocalist Terri Bjerre. "You Got What I Need" charted in the top 25 dance club chart for Billboard Magazine.

In 2024, he started collaborating with Ron Carroll which produced some Carroll's last releases: "Get Up", "Lifted in Sound", "Get On The Floor", and "Lost".

== Discography ==
=== Producer/artist ===
- 2024 "Lifted In Sound (with Ron Carroll)
- 2024 "Get Up" (with Ron Carroll)
- 2025 "Get On The Floor" (with Ron Carroll)
- 2025 "Same Vibration" (with Soleil Carrillo & Kellari)
- 2025 "Lost" - Ron Carroll
- 2019 - "Last Night In Miami" - Kat Deluna - (Remix Production: arranger, composer, remixer)
- 2019 - "You Got What I Need" - Rod Carrillo, Terri Bjerre - (Arranger, Composer, Executive Producer)
- 2019 - "The Album" - Rosabel - (Engineer, Executive Producer)
- 2019 - "Cello House" - Soleil Carrillo - (Arranger, Composer, Executive Producer)
- 2019 - "Take It Off" - Reiss Harrison - (Composer, arranger, Executive Producer)
- 2019 - "Push" - Eric Redd - (Composer, Arranger, Writer, Executive Producer)
- 2019 - "Night To Remember" - The Terri Green Project (Remixer, A&R)
- 2017 - "Anthem of House" - Rosabel & Terri Bjerre (Executive producer, remixer, engineer)
- 2017 - "Alegre" - Rod Carrillo - (Composer, Writer)
- 2017 - "Right Time" - Eric Redd - (Composer, Writer, Executive Producer)
- 2016 - "Bajada" - Rod Carrillo - (Composer, Arranger, Executive Producer)
- 2016 - "2 Sides To The Story" - Ralphi Rosario (Executive producer, Vocals Engineer, Production, A&R)
- 2016 - "Night Shift" - Sol N Beef (Composer, Arranger, Executive Producer)
- 2015 - "La Jungla" - Ralphi Rosario ft. Julissa Veloz (Vocals Engineer, Executive Producer)
- 2015 - "Sax Please" - Sol N Beef (Composer, Arranger, Executive Producer)
- 2015 - "Tickle My" - The Head Assembly ft. Julissa Veloz (Composer, arranger, Executive Producer)
- 2013 - "Come With Me" (album) - Kelsey B. (Executive Producer, composer, arranger)
- 2013 - "Stronger" (album) - Bouvier & Barona (Executive Producer)
- 2013 - "What Cha Feelin'" - Liam Keegan feat. Julissa Veloz & Kae Lou
- 2013 - "Hurts" - Kelsey B (Carvelo production with Julissa Veloz)
- 2013 - "Need You' - Kelsey B.
- 2013 - "I'm Dancin'" - Eric Redd
- 2013 - "Surrender" - Bouvier & Barona feat. Abigail (singer)
- 2013 - "See Dis" - Kelsey B
- 2012 - "Different" - Trevor Simpson and Julissa Veloz
- 2012 - "Don't Care - Eric Redd
- 2012 - "2 of Us" - Jesse McFadding feat. Julissa Veloz
- 2012 - "Be With You" - Kelsey B
- 2012 - "Zimme (Give It All)" - Julissa Veloz
- 2012 - "Overload" - Julissa Veloz
- 2012 - "It Would" - Julissa Veloz
- 2012 - "Very Brady Day" Julissa Veloz
- 2012 - "Status" - Carvelo feat. Kelsey B
- 2012 - The Noise EP - Matt Fox
- 2011 - "Yes No Maybe" - RCDM feat. Candace Sames
- 2011 - "Boy If You Only Knew" - Kelsey B
- 2011 - "54" - Eric Redd
- 2011 - "Another Day" - Eric Redd
- 2011 - Mayhem - Julissa Veloz
- 2011 - "Rave Juice" - Matt Fox feat. LsDub
- 2011 - "Pressure" - Matt Fox feat. LsDub
- 2011 - "Downtown" - Matt Fox feat. Kelsey B
- 2011 - "Eat It" - Matt Fox feat. Ny-D
- 2011 - "Brat Attack" - Matt Fox
- 2011 - "Fiction" - Matt Fox
- 2011 - "Dumb" - Natalia Flores
- 2011 - "Azucarena" (Album) - Natalia Flores (Executive Producer, composer, arranger)
- 2011 - "Faceless" - Rod Carrillo & Shefali
- 2011 - "Sweet Sugar Poison" - Dave Matthias vs Julissa Veloz
- 2011 - "Candela" - Bodega Charlie
- 2011 - "Beauty Queen" - Kelsey B
- 2010 - "Take Control" - Julissa Veloz (US Dance #8)
- 2010 - "Going Strong" - Natalia Flores (US Dance #18)
- 2010 - "Predator" - Julissa Veloz (US Dance #19)
- 2010 - "Breathe" - Eric Redd (US Dance #32)
- 2010 - "Prelude" - Rod Carrillo and Ronnie Sumrall,
- 2010 - "Eyes on Me" - Rod Carrillo and Ronnie Sumrall,
- 2010 - "Breakin' Out" - Rod Carrillo and Ronnie Sumrall,
- 2010 - "Achilles Heel" - Rod Carrillo and Ronnie Sumrall,
- 2010 - "Doin' Better" - Rod Carrillo and Ronnie Sumrall,
- 2010 - "It's Not Like You" - Rod Carrillo and Ronnie Sumrall,
- 2010 - "Let It Go" - Rod Carrillo and Ronnie Sumrall,
- 2010 - "Oh Yeah" - Rod Carrillo and Ronnie Sumrall,
- 2010 - "Long Time" - Rod Carrillo and Ronnie Sumrall (US Dance #23)
- 2010 - "Rhythm" - Rod Carrillo and Ronnie Sumrall,
- 2009 - "Angel On The Dancefloor" - Dave Matthias feat. Natalia Flores (US Dance #23)
- 2009 - "Moonshine Rising" - Rod Carrillo and Ronnie Sumrall (US Dance #25),
- 2009 - "Here We Come' - Rod Carrillo and Shefali (US Dance #25),
- 2009 - "Big Mama's House" - Capretta (Big Mama Capretta)
- 2009 - "Gringa Quiero Baila" - Rod Carrillo Presents: Bodega Charlie feat. Fulanito
- 2008 - "Dale Mami" - Mula
- 2008 - "Save Me" - Carrillo & Amador feat. Ronnie Sumrall
- 2008 - "Oye Party" - Rod Carrillo Presents: Bodega Charlie (US Dance #13)
- 2007 - "Arizona Bump" - Rod Carrillo (US Dance #23)
- 2007 - "Green Tea" - Big J
- 2007 - "Nonsense Words" - Attorney Client Privilege feat DBL
- 2007 - " I Wish You Well" - Carrillo & Amador feat. Nina Lares
- 2007 - "Spotlight" - Carrillo & Amador feat. Georgia Nicole (US Dance #8)
- 2007 - "Work It" - DJ Kilo
- 2007 - "Free Your Mind" - Kario

== Los Sonidos track list ==
Track	Song
1	"Latin Check 808"
2	"You Got What I Need" feat. Terri Bjerre
3	"Trumpeta"
4	"Save Me" feat. Eric Redd
5	"Alegre" (Hoxton Whores Mix)
6	"City of Magic" feat. Lisa Williams
7	"A Thang"
8	"What You Want'" feat. Reiss Harrison
9	"You Got What I Need" feat. Terri Bjerre -(Kebab & Cream Mix)
10	"Alegre" (Ralphi Rosario's Big Mix) - Album Bundled Only
