= Dynamite (Liza Fox song) =

Single by Liza Fox
- Released: October 22, 2014
- Recorded: 2014
- Genre: Dance-pop
- Length: 3:18
- Label: I.L.M. (USA), Cat Music (Romania), Clipper's Sounds (Spain), MyMusic Group (Poland)
- Songwriter(s): Radu Sîrbu, Ana Sîrbu
- Producer(s): Radu Sîrbu (Producer), Ruff Loaderz, WestFunk, Meed Diggo, Max Lazarev (Remix Producers), Newton Lee (Executive Producer)

Liza Fox singles chronology
"Gimme All (Ring My Bell)" (2013)	"Dynamite" (2014)	"I Am Not I" (2015)

Ruff Loaderz remix

Audio sample
- "Dynamite": file; help

"Dynamite" is a song by recording artist Liza Fox. It was written by Radu Sîrbu and Ana Sîrbu. The remixes were done by Meed Diggo and Max Lazarev, Westfunk, and Ruff Loaderz.

Released on October 22, 2014, "Dynamite" peaked at No. 33 on the U.K. Music Week Upfront Club chart in March 2015, and stayed for a total of 8 weeks on the chart. The Ruff Loaderz remix peaked at No. 11 on U.S. iTunes HOT 100 Weekly Chart (Electronic) on May 17, 2015.

== Composition ==
"Dynamite" is a dance-pop composition with electro influence. The Russian version of the same song is called "Динамит".

== Music videos ==
In the first music video, Liza Fox overpowered two macho guys with her supernatural ability, drove a fast and powerful sports car like in Fast and Furious, and played with dangerous fire in high-desert wind in the middle of the night. "I wanted to make this video true to life," she told IndiMusic TV. "That's why I didn't mind risking my life during the filming of it. Love is dangerous like dynamite." Released in May 2014, the video on the StarPro channel has garnered over 1 million YouTube views by June 2015.

In the second music video, Liza Fox was filmed by Christopher Speak as female Shepard in the popular video game Mass Effect 3 for the "Dynamite" remix by Meed Diggo & Max Lazarev.

In the July 30, 2015 episode of the TalentWatch TV Show serving music fans on Dish Network, Comcast TV and AT&T U-verse, host Alyssa Jacey praised Liza Fox as "the protector of abused women" in her Dynamite music video.

== Track listings ==
- Digital download / CD single / Mastered For iTunes (MFiT)
1. "Dynamite" – 3:18
- Digital download / Remix single
1. "Dynamite (Remix by Ruff Loaderz)" – 4:55
- Digital download / Remix single
1. "Dynamite (Remix by Meed Diggo & Max Lazarev)" – 4:46

== Weekly charts ==
Chart (2015)	Peak position
UK Music Week Upfront Club Chart	33
IndiMusic TV	3
