= Livin' for Your Love (Your Love) =

Single by Rosabel featuring Jeanie Tracy
- Released: April 26, 2016
- Recorded: 2016
- Genre: Dance, house
- Length: 6:28; 3:36 (radio edit)
- Label: Carrillo Music
- Songwriters: Ralphi Rosario, Abel Aguilera, Jeanie Tracy
- Producers: Ralphi Rosario; Abel Aguilera

Rosabel singles chronology
"Let Me Be Myself" (2012)	"Livin' for Your Love (Your Love)" (2016)	"Anthem of House" (2017)

"Livin' for Your Love (Your Love)" is a song recorded, written, and produced by the American electronic dance music duo Rosabel, featuring vocals by singer Jeanie Tracy. The underground garage-themed track reached number one on Billboard's Dance Club Songs chart in its July 30, 2016 issue, making it their sixth chart-topper, as well as their third with Tracy, who in turn picked up her fourth number one in total, all as a featured vocalist with production acts (the other being with the Brazilian act Altar with "Party People" in 2007).

== Track listings ==
iTunes listing

- "Livin' for Your Love (Your Love)" [Rosabel Housed Radio Mix] 3:36
- "Livin' for Your Love (Your Love)" [Rosabel Housed Club Mix] 6:28
- "Livin' for Your Love (Your Love)" [Spiritchaser Club Mix] 6:36
- "Livin' for Your Love (Your Love)" [Spiritlevel Dub Mix] 6:34
- "Livin' for Your Love (Your Love)" [Rosabel & E Thunder Peak Dub] 6:53
- "Livin' for Your Love (Your Love)" [Spiritchaser Club Instrumental] 6:36
