= Inessa Lee =

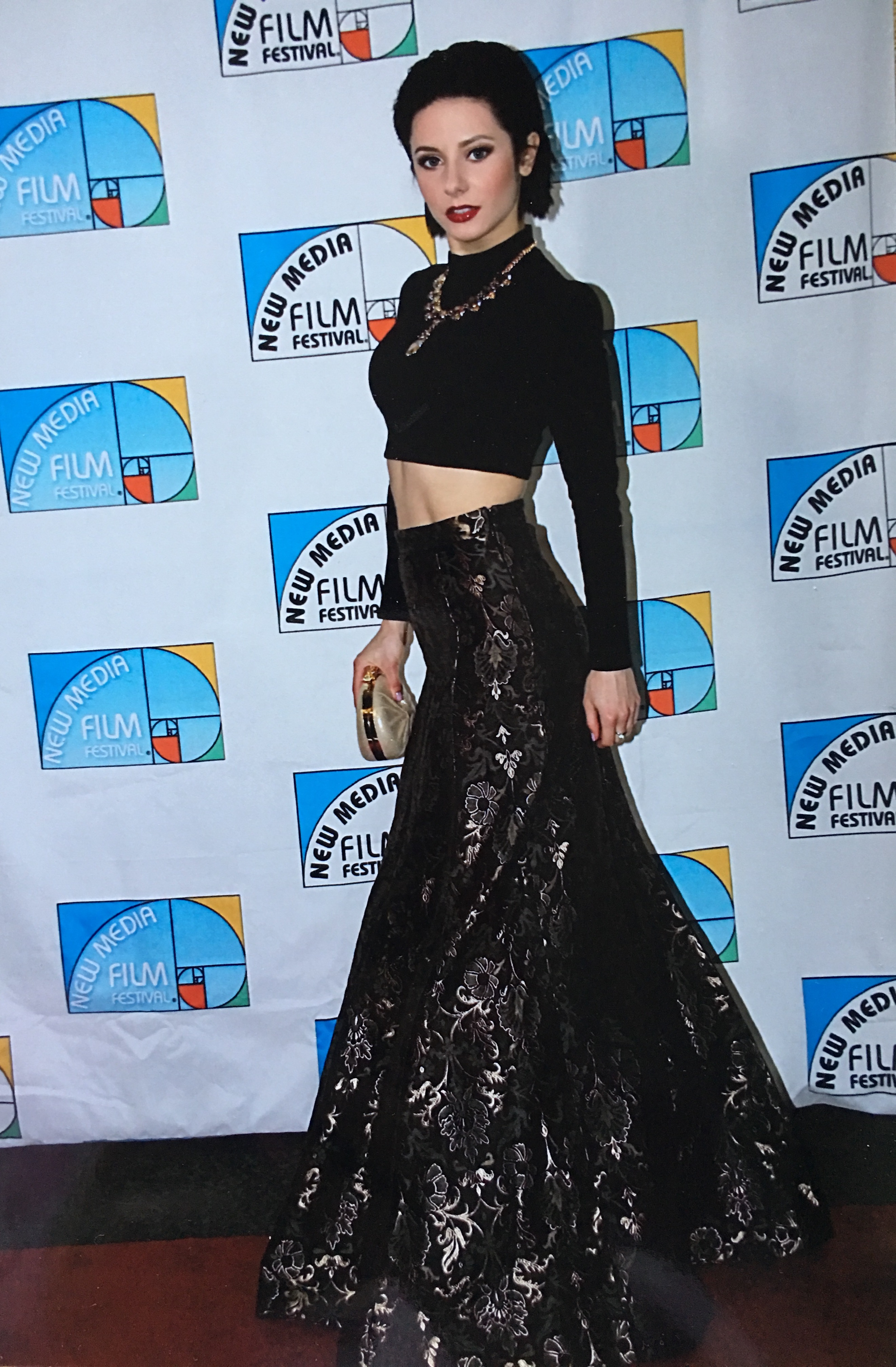
- Inessa Lee at New Media Film Festival 2018

Background information
- Also known as: Princess X; Liza Fox
- Born: March 13; Surgut, Russia
- Origin: Zhytomyr, Ukraine
- Genres: Dance, pop
- Occupation: Singer-songwriter
- Years active: 2010-present
- Labels: Shinko Music; IFERS Music
- Website: https://www.inessalee.com

Inessa Lee is a singer, songwriter, and social activist best known for her American Idol appearance and her U.S. Billboard charting single "Gimme All (Ring My Bell)". She was named in 2024 the number 1 vintage TikTok influencer for her Betty Boop parodies on social media.

== Career ==
=== 2010–2011 American Idol and "Insane in F#" ===
The singer gained international fame in early 2011 as a result of her appearance on the tenth season of the television series American Idol as the most prominent contestant from San-Francisco. MTV News portrays her as a "sexy video vixen."

Her song "Insane in F#" was aired on November 5, 2011 in the Lifetime original movie Cheyenne, a part of Five (for the Cure), directed by Penelope Spheeris (Wayne's World).

=== 2011 "You Turn Me On" ===
In 2011, the singer co-wrote "You Turn Me On" that was nominated for a 2011 HMMA Hollywood Music in Media Award (Dance Category) and was a finalist in the 2011 ISC International Songwriting Competition (Dance/Electronica).

In October 2013, the singer released a machinima music video "You Turn Me On" filmed by Pia Klaar based on the song of the same title in the 3D virtual world Second Life.

"You Turn Me On" has been featured in commercials for CBS TV shows including The Big Bang Theory, Good Wife, How I Met Your Mother, The Millers, The Price Is Right, Undercover Boss, The Young and the Restless.

=== 2012–2013 "Gimme All (Ring My Bell)" ===
In 2012, the singer co-wrote "Gimme All (Ring My Bell)" – a modern interpolation of the disco-era classic "Ring My Bell" by Anita Ward. The song peaked at No. 9 the U.K. Music Week Commercial Pop chart in February 2013 and stayed for 7 weeks on the chart. "Gimme All (Ring My Bell)" peaked at No. 12 on the U.S. Billboard Hot Dance Club Play chart in April 2013 and stayed for 9 weeks on the chart.

In February 2013, a 2-D mobile game "Be.X" was released. It features remixes by Ralphi Rosario, Mark Picchiotti, Almighty, and Hoxton Whores.

=== 2014 "Dynamite" ===
On May 19, 2014, Liza Fox's "Динамит" premiered on the StarPro channel. On November 21, the English version "Dynamite" premiered on the Cat Music channel in Romania. The song was written by Radu Sîrbu and Ana Sîrbu; and produced by Radu Sîrbu (a former band member of O-Zone).

Dynamite peaked at No. 33 on the U.K. Music Week Upfront Club chart in March 2015, and stayed for a total of 8 weeks on the chart. The Ruff Loaderz remix peaked at No. 11 on U.S. iTunes HOT 100 Weekly Chart (Electronic) on May 17, 2015.

In the July 30, 2015 episode of the TalentWatch TV Show serving music fans on Dish Network, Comcast TV and AT&T U-verse, host Alyssa Jacey praised the singer as "the protector of abused women" in her Dynamite music video.

=== 2015–2016 "I Am Not I" ===
The 6-song album I Am Not I was released on August 6 with rave reviews. DJ Robert Scott called it "a marvelous pop/dance affair of the highest order," MusicDish considered it "the true epic of Liza Fox and her struggle", Hollywood Weekly praised that it "brings a hypnotic beat and mesmerizing music... like Liza's colorful personality, her songs also exhibit each distinctive color shining in the rainbow," and Computers in Entertainment predicted that "it will surely become a rage in the EDM circuits."

In October 2015, I Am Not I reached No. 1 on ReverbNation's U.S. and worldwide EDM charts. In November 2015, the song peaked at No. 15 on the U.K. Music Week Commercial Pop Chart. In March 2016, the song peaked at No. 41 on the U.S. Billboard Dance Club Songs Chart.

=== 2023 "Coffee Face" ===
After a long break from music, Lee released an EDM coffee anthem. Coffee Face peaked at No. 1 on Spotify's Top 50 Luxembourg and No. 2 on Iceland chart, staying there for 3 weeks.

=== 2025 "Love Gun" ===
Lee released Love Gun which peaked at No. 5 on UK Music Week Commercial Pop Chart, and at No. 10 on Spotify's Top Songs Japan chart, staying there for 2 weeks. The song went viral after launching a dance flash mob "Love Gun for Peace" supported by many popular TikTok influencers against war and cyberbullying. The song has become pride anthem in UK club scene.

== Awards and nominations ==
| Year | Award | Category | Nominated work | Result |
|---|---|---|---|---|
| 2011 | Hollywood Music in Media Awards (HMMA) | Best Dance Song | "You Turn Me On" | Nominated |
| 2011 | International Songwriting Competition (ISC) | Dance/Electronica | "You Turn Me On" | Finalist |
| 2012 | Hollywood Music in Media Awards (HMMA) | Best Dance Song | "Gimme All (Ring My Bell)" | Nominated |
| 2012 | International Songwriting Competition (ISC) | Dance/Electronica | "Gimme All (Ring My Bell)" | Semi-finalist |
| 2013 | Hollywood Music in Media Awards (HMMA) | Best Dance Song | "Free" | Nominated |

== Discography ==
=== Singles ===
| Single | Year |
|---|---|
| "Insane in F#" | 2010 |
| "You Turn Me On" | 2011 |
| "Gimme All (Ring My Bell)" | 2012, 2013 |
| "Free" | 2013 |
| "Динамит" ("Dynamite") | 2014 |
| "Unlimited" | 2015 |
| "I Am Not I" | 2015 |
| "Coffee Face (2023 Remastered Edition)" | 2023 |
| "Love Gun" | 2025 |

=== EPs ===
As Liza Fox and Jus Grata

- I Am Not I (2015)
1. "I Am Not I"
2. "Coffee Face"
3. "Love Gun"
4. "Seize the Moment"
5. "Super Jazz"
6. "Unlimited (Jus Grata Remix)"

== Transhumanism ==
In 2019 Inessa Lee joined the U.S. Transhumanist Party and became a contributing author of The Transhumanism Handbook by Newton Lee. She contributed a chapter suggesting a socioeconomic theory she calls equalism, based on the even distribution of resources on the planet due to technology advancements during the singularity era. In 2020 she became the Chief Ideologist of California Transhumanist Party and created a 7-point program that offers a solution to social stratification.

== Links ==
- Official website
- Inessa Lee on Instagram
- Inessa Lee on TikTok
