= I Am Not I =

EP by Liza Fox
- Released: August 6, 2015
- Recorded: October 11, 2014 – April 3, 2015
- Studio: Paramount Recording Studios (Hollywood, California), Encore Recording Studios (Burbank, California), The Invisible Studios, (West Hollywood, California)
- Genre: EDM; pop
- Length: 21:20
- Label: I.L.M.
- Producer: Jus Grata; Wideboys (remix producer); Newton Lee (executive producer)

Singles from I Am Not I
- 1. "Unlimited (Original Mix)" Released: May 22, 2015; 2. "I Am Not I (Wideboys Club Mix)" Released: September 17, 2015

I Am Not I is the debut extended play by the American recording artist Liza Fox and Hungarian DJ Jus Grata. It was released on August 6, 2015. I Am Not I explores a unique combination of EDM, pop and electro house. Recording sessions took place between October 2014 and April 2015 at Paramount Recording Studios, Encore Recording Studios and The Invisible Studios in Los Angeles, California.

Of the album's six tracks, the first five were written by Liza Fox and Jus Grata. The last track is Jus Grata's remix of the single "Unlimited" written by Liza Fox, Jus Grata and Italian DJ Mario Romano.

== Music videos ==
The album had two music videos released for its title track "I Am Not I". The first video depicts the singer's ordeal to raise awareness of bipolar disorder and MusicDish considered it "the true epic of Liza Fox and her struggle." The second video features the Wideboys sax trap remix with music visualization from the hypnotic rhythm game Audiosurf 2.

== Reception ==
The album has received rave reviews. Computers in Entertainment predicted that "it will surely become a rage in the EDM circuits." On October 1, I Am Not I reached #1 on ReverbNation's U.S. and global EDM charts. The title track "I Am Not I" peaked at #15 on the UK Music Week Commercial Pop Club Chart and #41 on the U.S. Billboard Dance Club Songs Chart.

Hollywood Weekly featured Liza Fox on the cover of its September 2015 issue (health and wellness edition). The magazine praised the "I Am Not I" album:

Liza Fox makes a smash with her new album "I Am Not I" which brings a hypnotic beat and mesmerizing music... Undoubtedly, Liza's raw talent results in an album with songs that take you on a journey of the senses; one which tantalizes the mind with mixed feelings. Like Liza's colorful personality, her songs also exhibit each distinctive color shining in the rainbow; each lighter and darker hue. One embarks on a zealous dancing-dynamic disposition with her single "Unlimited" to an imperious sort of trance while deciphering the complex meaning behind "I Am Not I." Think of her album as perfect for both a high-intensity workout and for setting a sultry mood. Rarely does an artist grasp so many diverse sentiments within only one album. And this is just one of the reasons Liza Fox is so far distinguished from other singers and songwriters.

== Track listing ==
No.	Title	Writer(s)	Length
1.	"I Am Not I"	Liza Fox, Jus Grata	3:24
2.	"Coffee Face"	Liza Fox, Jus Grata	4:53
3.	"Love Gun"	Liza Fox, Jus Grata	3:37
4.	"Seize the Moment"	Liza Fox, Jus Grata	3:28
5.	"Super Jazz"	Liza Fox, Jus Grata	2:46
6.	"Unlimited (Jus Grata Remix)"	Liza Fox, Jus Grata, Mario Romano	3:09
Total length:			21:20

== Weekly charts ==
Chart (2015)	Peak position
U.S. Billboard Dance Club Songs Chart	41
UK Music Week Commercial Pop Club Chart	15
ReverbNation EDM (U.S. and Global)	1
