= If This Is Love (disambiguation) =

"If This Is Love" is a song by The Saturdays.

If This Is Love may also refer to:

- If This Is Love (Joey Travolta song), covered by Melissa Manchester
- "If This Is Love", a song by Lynn Anderson from the 1968 album Ride, Ride, Ride
- "If This Is Love", a song by Glen Campbell from the 1969 album Galveston
- "If This Is Love", a 1970 song by Jack Greene
- "If This Is Love", a 1978 song by The Fantastic Four
- "If This Is Love", a 1984 song by Ronnie Prophet with Glory-Anne Carriere
- "If This Is Love", a single by Australian Crawl from the 1985 album Between a Rock and a Hard Place
- "If This Is Love", a single by Feargal Sharkey from the 1988 album Wish
- "If This Is Love", a 1991 single by J.J. (Jan Johnston)
- "If This Is Love", a 1993 single by Barney Bentall and the Legendary Hearts
- "If This Is Love", a song by Tisha Campbell from the 1993 album Tisha
- "If This Is Love", a 1984 song by Soulsister
- "If This Is Love", a song by Jeanie Tracy from the 1995 album It's My Time
- "If This Is Love (I'd Rather Be Lonely)", a 1967 song by The Precisions
- "If This Is Love", a 1991 song by Contraband
- "If This Is Love", a song by Marcia Ball from the 1995 album Blue House
- "If This Is Love", a song by Deana Carter from the 1996 album Did I Shave My Legs for This?
- "If This Is Love", a song by Take That from the 1993 album Everything Changes
- "If This Is Love", a song by Millie Jackson from the 1972 album Millie Jackson
- "If This Is Love", a song by Boy Howdy from the 1992 album Welcome to Howdywood
- "If This Is Love", a song by Kate DeAraugo from the 2005 album A Place I've Never Been
- "If This Is Love", a song by Hot Tuna from the 2011 album Steady as She Goes
- "If This Is Love", a song by The Foreign Exchange from the 2008 album Leave It All Behind
- "If This Is Love", a song by Jonny Lang from the 1998 album Wander This World
- "If This Is Love", a song by Lee Aaron from the 1987 album Lee Aaron (album)
- "(If This Is Love) Give Me More", a song by Steve Harley & Cockney Rebel from the 1976 album Love's a Prima Donna

== See also ==
- If This Isn't Love, standard sung by Bing Crosby and others
