= Ralphi Rosario =

American house musician

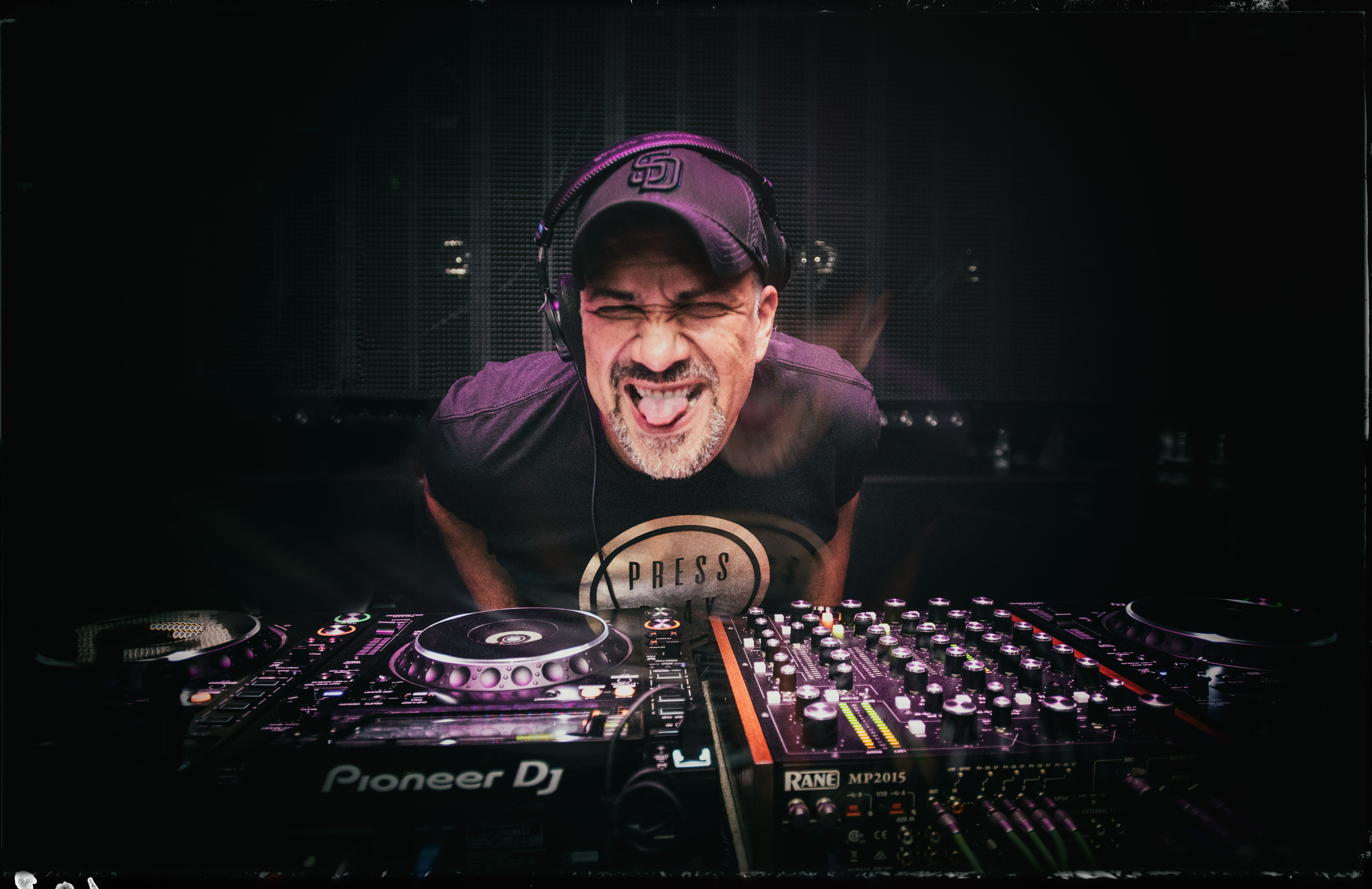
- Rosario at Ministry of Sound 2018

Background information
- Also known as: Rosabel
- Origin: Chicago, Illinois, U.S.
- Genres: EDM; house
- Years active: 1985–present
- Label: Carrillo Music
- Website: ralphirosario.com

Ralphi Rosario is an American house musician and founding member of the influential Chicago DJ group Hot Mix 5.

== Biography ==
When Hot Mix 5 was formed in 1981 on radio station WBMX (now WVAZ), Rosario, the youngest member of the group, was still in high school. The Hot Mix 5 went on to become one of the leading forces in the early Chicago house music scene.

Like other members of the group, Rosario eventually branched out into music production and remixing. His first release, made in collaboration with Vince Lawrence, was "Sample That!" in 1986 under the name Bang Orchestra. In 1987, his collaboration with Xaviera Gold, "You Used to Hold Me", became a big hit for Rosario that was subsequently remixed and re-released several times.

Rosario continues to work as a DJ and remixer and has released several albums. He has remixed tracks by artists including INXS, the Shamen, Jomanda, Culture Beat, Gloria Estefan, Mylène Farmer, Deee-Lite, Pet Shop Boys, Madonna, Kylie Minogue, Giorgio Moroder, Michael Bublé, Mariah Carey, Ricky Martin, Kelly Clarkson, Pussycat Dolls, Goldfrapp, Rihanna, Taio Cruz, Katy Perry, and Beyoncé. On December 1, 2011, it was announced that Rosario, with producing partner Abel Aguilera, received a 2012 Grammy nomination for the Rosabel Club Mix of the Rihanna track "Only Girl (In the World)".

In 2015, his single featuring Julissa Veloz, "La Jungla", gained many positive reviews.

In 2016, his collaboration with Abel Aguilera under their Rosabel alias, gave Rosario another Billboard Dance Chart #1 single with "Livin' for Your Love (Your Love)" (Carrillo Music). This is his sixth #1 single with Aguilera under Rosabel and features the vocals of singer Jeanie Tracy.

In December 2016, Rosario notched his second solo Billboard Dance Chart #1 single for "Button Pusha" which features the vocals of Aneeta Beat. "Button Pusha" is the third charting hit from Rosario's 2 Sides to the Story album. The others charting singles include "La Jungla" featuring Julissa Veloz. and "F*ck Your Boyfriend" featuring Francesca Catalano

In May 2017, his latest collaboration with Abel Aguilera, under their Rosabel alias, garnered Rosario another Billboard Dance Chart #1 single with "Anthem of House". This is his seventh #1 single with Aguilera under Rosabel and features the vocals of singer Terri Bjerre.

In 2019, Rosario with Abel Aguilera announced their first ever studio album under their Rosabel alias. The duo named the project The Album. Rosabel's 14 song album featured singers Jeanie Tracy, Terri Bjerre and Tamara Wallace. Rosario and Aguilera worked once again with Rod Carrillo at Carrillo Music to oversee The Album, and shortly after Rosabel announced a tour in support for their new music. The Album was released on April 26, 2019.

== Discography ==
=== Albums ===
- 45 Miles of Nerves – Ralphi Rosario (Underground Construction/Afterhours)
- La Collezione Privata - Ralphi Rosario (Stickman music)

=== Singles ===
- "You Used to Hold Me"
- "La Jungla" featuring Julissa Veloz
- "F*ck Your Boyfriend" featuring Francesca Catalano
- "Button Pusha" featuring Aneeta Beat

=== Remixes ===
- The Absolute featuring Suzanne Palmer – I Believe
- Amy Grant – Find a Way
- Ariana Grande featuring Big Sean – Right There
- Assia Ahhatt – If Only Tonight
- B Howard – DSYLM
- Bang Orchestra – Sample That
- Barry Manilow – Copacabana
- Beyoncé – Irreplaceable
- Beyoncé – Grown Woman
- Bonnie Tyler – Two Out of Three Ain't Bad
- BWO – Right Here Right Now
- Celine Dion – Taking Chances
- Cher – A Different Kind of Love Song
- Cyndi Lauper – Same Ol' Story
- Dave Audé feat. Luciana – Something For The Weekend
- Dave Audé feat. Andy Bell – Aftermath (Here We Go)
- David Longoria – Zoon Baloomba
- DJ Fenix & Lisa Williams – California Sun
- Donna Summer – I Got Your Love
- Donna Summer – Fame (The Game)
- Donna Summer – Hot Stuff 2018 (with Erick Ibiza)
- Emii – Mr. Romeo
- Emin Agalarov featuring Nile Rodgers – Boomerang
- Enrique Iglesias – Do You Know? (The Ping Pong Song)
- Garbage – Bleed Like Me
- Giorgio Moroder featuring Kylie Minogue – Right Here, Right Now
- Gloria Estefan – You'll Be Mine (Party Time)
- Gloria Estefan – Tres Deseos
- Gloria Estefan – Hotel Nacional
- Gloria Estefan – Hotel Nacional
- Goldfrapp – Anymore
- Heidi Montag – More Is More
- Ivy Queen – Que Lloren
- INXS - Not Enough Time
- Janet Jackson – Feedback
- Janet Jackson – Make Me
- Jeanie Tracy – Can't Take My Eyes Off You
- Jeanie Tracy – Keep The Party Jumpin
- Jeanie Tracy – Cha Cha Heels
- Jennifer Lopez featuring Pitbull – On The Floor
- Jesse McCartney – Leavin
- Jessica Sutta – Show Me
- Joe Jonas – Love Slayer
- Jordan Knight – Give It To You
- Justin Timberlake featuring Beyoncé – Until The End Of Time
- KC and the Sunshine Band – I Love You More
- KC and the Sunshine Band & Bimbo Jones – I'm Feeling You
- KC and the Sunshine Band – We Belong Together
- Kelly Clarkson – Walk Away
- Kelly Rowland feat. David Guetta – Commander
- Kerli – Walking on Air
- Lady Gaga and Ariana Grande – Rain on Me
- Liza Fox – Gimme All (Ring My Bell)
- Madonna – Erotica
- Madonna – Love Profusion
- Malea – Give
- Mariah Carey – Don't Forget About Us
- Mariah Carey – I Stay in Love
- Mariah Carey – Up Out My Face
- Mariah Carey – Auld Lang Syne (The New Year's Anthem)
- Matchbox 20 – How Far We've Come
- Michael Bublé – Save the Last Dance for Me
- Michael Bublé – Spider-Man Theme
- Michael Bublé – Sway
- Mýa – Movin' On
- Mylène Farmer & Sting – Stolen Car
- Nelly Furtado featuring Timbaland – Promiscuous
- Noelia – My Everything
- Noelia – Spell featuring Timbaland
- Pet Shop Boys – Did You See Me Coming
- Pet Shop Boys – To Step Aside
- Princess X – Gimme All (Ring My Bell)
- Pussycat Dolls – Don't Cha
- Pussycat Dolls – When I Grow Up
- Pussycat Dolls – Hush Hush
- Ricky Martin featuring Fat Joe & Amerie – I Don't Care
- Ricky Martin – Pégate
- Ricky Martin – Más/Freak of Nature
- Ricky Martin – Come with Me
- Rihanna featuring David Guetta – Right Now
- Rod Stewart – Da Ya Think I'm Sexy?
- Rod Carrillo – Alegre
- Rod Carrillo & Terri Bjerre – You Got What I Need
- RuPaul – Cha Cha Bitch
- Samantha Mumba – Lately
- Selena Gomez & the Scene – Naturally
- Spice Girls – Spice Up Your Life
- Stevie Nicks – Stand Back
- Tami Chynn featuring Akon – Frozen
- The Tamperer featuring Maya Days – "If You Buy This Record (Your Life Will Be Better)"
- Taio Cruz – Dynamite
- Yenn – Pretty Ugly
- Yoko Ono – Everyman… Everywoman…
- Yoko Ono – Give Me Something
- Yoko Ono – Wouldnit (I'm a Star)
- Yoko Ono – Move on Fast
- Yoko Ono – Talking to the Universe
- Yoko Ono – She Gets Down on Her Knees
- Yoko Ono – I'm Moving On
- Yoko Ono – Hold Me feat. Dave Aude
- Yoko Ono – Walk on Think Ice
- The Wanted – All Time Low
- Zendaya – Replay (Zendaya song)
- Katy Perry – Swish Swish
- Donna Summer – Hotstuff
- Anggun – What We Remember
- Goldfrapp – Anymore
- Goldfrapp – Sister Magic
- Reba McEntire – The Heart Is A Lonely Hunter {2021}
