= Ring My Bell (disambiguation) =

"Ring My Bell" is a song by Anita Ward.

Ring My Bell may also refer to:

- "Ring My Bell" (DJ Jazzy Jeff & The Fresh Prince song), based on the Anita Ward song
- "Ring My Bell" (Monie Love vs. Adeva song)
- "Ring My Bell" (Hitomi Yaida song)
- "Gimme All (Ring My Bell)", a song by Liza Fox, a modern interpolation of the Anita Ward song
- "Ring My Bell", a song by Billie Piper from her album Walk of Life
- "Ring My Bell", a song by Blue Drops, featured as the opening theme in the first season of the anime Heaven's Lost Property
- "Ring My Bell", a song by Girl's Day from their album Love
- "Ring My Bell", a song by Madonna from the deluxe edition of her album Hard Candy
- "Ring My Bells", a song by Enrique Iglesias from his album Insomniac
