= Gimme All (Ring My Bell) =

2013 single by Princess X

Single by Inessa Lee as Princess X
- Released: January 7, 2013 and December 11, 2013
- Recorded: 2012; Peermusic Recording Studio, Burbank, California
- Genre: Dance-pop
- Length: 3:21
- Label: I.L.M. (USA), Energy Production Records (Italy), Pop The Record (Israel)
- Songwriter(s): Inessa Lee, Heidi Rojas, L.C. Gonzalez, Frederick Knight
- Producer(s): L.C. Gonzalez (Producer), Ralphi Rosario, Mark Picchiotti, Almighty, and Hoxton Whores (Remix Producers), Newton Lee (Executive Producer)

Inessa Lee as Princess X singles chronology
| "You Turn Me On" (2011) | "Gimme All (Ring My Bell)" (2013) | "Dynamite" (2014) |

Audio sample
- "Gimme All (Ring My Bell)": file; help

"Gimme All (Ring My Bell)" is a song by recording artist Inessa Lee, known at the time as Princess X and later known as Liza Fox. It was written by Inessa Lee, Heidi Rojas, and L.C. Gonzalez with samples from Ring My Bell by Frederick Knight. "Gimme All (Ring My Bell)" is an evolution of the disco-era classic sound. The remixes were done by Grammy Award nominated producer Ralphi Rosario, Mark Picchiotti, Almighty, and Hoxton Whores.

Released on January 7, 2013, "Gimme All (Ring My Bell)" peaked at No. 9 on the U.K. Music Week Commercial Pop chart in February 2013, and stayed for 7 weeks on the chart. "Gimme All (Ring My Bell)" peaked at No. 12 on the U.S. Billboard Hot Dance Club Play chart in April 2013, and stayed for 9 weeks on the chart.

== Composition ==
"Gimme All (Ring My Bell)" is a dance-pop composition with electro influence that interpolates the recurrent elements of the 1979 song Ring My Bell written by Frederick Knight and performed by Anita Ward.

"Gimme All (Ring My Bell)" is not only about sexual expression. The singer states that the song reveals her passion about the one who can "ring her bell." In the first verse, she wants to captivate the object of her affection, but towards the end of the song she gets trapped in her own feelings. The bridge is the climax of her desire to possess him that borders on insanity. She says, "I put my blood and tears in this song, because it's the story about my insane passion and love."

== Music video ==
The music video for "Gimme All (Ring My Bell)" was filmed in Los Angeles. With over 1 million views, the video shows a vampire love story that features the singer as a seductive vamp woman who captivates a guy with her spells and keeps him in a dungeon.

=== Synopsis ===
Princess X in the music video for "Gimme All (Ring My Bell)"

In the beginning of the video, the singer whispers the words of passion into the guy's ears, gently touching his skin and his lips. Towards the end of the video, she hypnotizes the victim and bites his neck. In the last scene he turns into a vampire spirit, joining the group of male vampire spirits who had been seduced and bitten by the singer before.

The singer appears in several images throughout the video: as a rock star surrounded by pale spirits; a seductress in the elegant gown with vampire fangs; an insane furious woman trapped in the white tunnel. Eventually she demands "Gimme all you got!" and waves the magnificent red cloak to unveil her mystical power.

"Gimme All (Ring My Bell)" is a story about insane passion and love.

== Track listings ==
- Digital download / CD single
1. "Gimme All (Ring My Bell)" – 3:21
2. "Gimme All (Ring My Bell) [Ringtone]" – 0:16
3. "Gimme All (Ring My Bell) [Mark Picchiotti Radio Edit]" – 3:55
4. "Gimme All (Ring My Bell) [Ralphi Rosario Vocal] – 7:06
5. "Gimme All (Ring My Bell) [Ralphi Rosario Dub] – 6:49
6. "Gimme All (Ring My Bell) [Almighty Club Mix] – 5:26
7. "Gimme All (Ring My Bell) [Almighty Radio Edit] – 3:45
8. "Gimme All (Ring My Bell) [Hoxton Whores Club Mix] 5:37
9. "Gimme All (Ring My Bell) [Hoxton Whores Dub] 5:37
10. "Gimme All (Ring My Bell) [Hoxton Whores Radio Edit] 3:41
11. "Gimme All (Ring My Bell) [Instrumental] – 3:28
- HD Music Videos / DVD
1. "Main Mix" – 3:36
2. "Ralphi Rosario Club Mix" – 7:06

== Weekly charts ==
| Chart (2013) | Peak Chart Position | Number of Weeks on Chart |
|---|---|---|
| U.K. Music Week Commercial Pop Chart | 9 | 7 |
| U.S. Billboard Dance/Club Play Chart | 12 | 9 |
