= Radu Sîrbu =

Moldovan singer and music producer (born 1978)

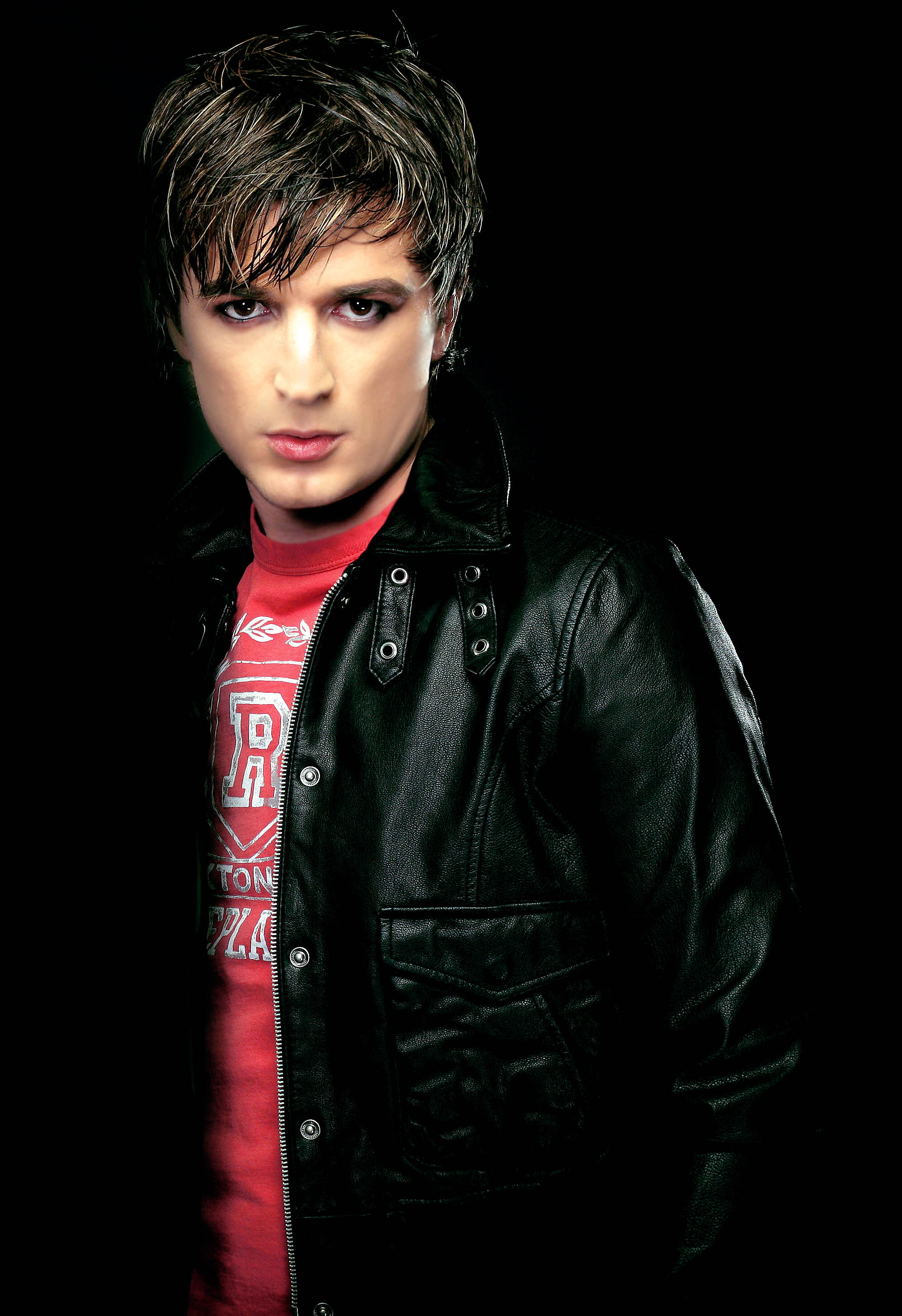
- Sîrbu in 2009

Background information
- Born: 14 December 1978 (age 47); Peresecina, Moldavian SSR, Soviet Union
- Origin: Moldova
- Genres: Rock, Eurodance, Pop rock
- Occupations: Singer, producer
- Years active: 1995–present
- Label: Indie
- Formerly of: O-Zone, Wild Rose Project, Mr&Ms, DJ Layla, Alissa, Dee-Dee

Radu Sîrbu (also known as Radu Sârbu, RadU, and Picasso; born 14 December 1978) is a Moldovan singer and music producer. He was part of the pop music trio O-Zone which released the single "Dragostea din tei". He is based in Bucharest, Romania.

== Biography ==
Radu Sîrbu was born on December 14, 1978, in Peresecina village, where he spent his early childhood. For a portion of his youth, he also lived in the cities of Orhei and Bălți. He would later return to Peresecina to complete high school and work as a DJ at his father's nightclub. He also organized musical theatre shows through his studio, "Artshow," which he created for children and teenagers. After graduating in 1996, he began his studies at the Chișinău Music Conservatory and taught vocal classes for children on the side.

In 2001, Sîrbu was selected to be a member of O-Zone during a casting session organized by the Moldavian singer Dan Balan. The group was then made up of three members: Sîrbu, Balan, and Arsenie Todiras (nicknamed Arsenium). The group quickly gained popularity in Moldova. They moved to Bucharest in 2002 to expand their notoriety further.

The band's first successful song was 'Despre Tine' ('About You'), which topped the charts in Romania. Their second hit, 'Dragostea Din Tei' ('Love from the Linden Trees') brought O-Zone international fame. After spending four weeks at the top of the Romanian Top 100, the Italian label Time Records offered them a one-year contract. After its release in Italy at the beginning of 2004, the song became a hit across Europe and topped the Eurochart Hot 100 for twelve weeks. Dragostea Din Tei reached the first position in the French, German, Belgian, Swiss, and Dutch charts at the end of 2004.

In January 2005, the trio announced that O-Zone would be disbanded and that they had planned to focus on their respective solo careers. Balan would move to the United States with his rock band 'Balan', while Todiras launched a solo career in Germany under the name Arsenium. Sîrbu would also work on solo projects. In 2005, he worked with DJ Mahay and released the song 'Dulce'. He made a music video for the song 'Whap-pa' and released his album titled Alone. More recently, he released his single Doi străini (Two Strangers) alongside a music video. In 2007, he and Arsenium got together and released the single July. He changed his stage name to RadU, and currently lives in Romania with his wife, Ana Sîrbu, and their children.

== Production ==
After releasing his first album under Mr. and Mrs. Sîrbu, Sîrbu began to work with DJ Layla. They produced the song 'Single Lady' by DJ Layla, featuring Alissa. The lyrics were co-written by Radu and Sianna Sîrbu. The video for 'Single Lady' was released, and the track reached No.1 in Europa Plus Moscow/Russia. Sîrbu also released a second single with DJ Layla, 'City Of Sleeping Hearts' and released a music video for it.

He then started producing under the brand Wild Rose Project. The first single of the project, named 'Ecstasy', was in collaboration with the artist Dee-Dee. In 2014, Radu produced the song 'Dynamite', sung by Liza Fox with lyrics co-written by Radu Sîrbu, Ana Sîrbu, and Inessa Lee. The song reached the top 40 charts in the United Kingdom.

== Albums ==
=== Alone ===
1. "Whap-pa"
2. "Perfect Body"
3. "Tu Nu"
4. "Ya Proshu"
5. "Zâmbeşti cu mine (feat. Anastasia-Dalia)"
6. "Fly"
7. "Sună Seara"
8. "Leave Me Alone"
9. "Whap-pa (English version)"
10. "Whap-pa (RMX Radu)"

=== Heartbeat ===
1. "Heartbeat"
2. "Love Is not a Reason to Cry"
3. "Stop Hating Me"
4. "Doare"
5. "Don't Be Afraid"
6. "Nu Uita"
7. "She Is The Best Song I Ever Wrote"
8. "Iubirea Ca Un Drog"
9. "Daun-Daha (Save My Life)"
10. "It's Too Late"
11. "Monalisa"
12. "Love Is Not A Reason To Cry (Club Remix)"
13. "Love Is Not A Reason To Cry (Radio Remix)"

== Singles ==
- "Mix Dojdi" (1995)
- "Dulce" (featuring DJ Mahay) (2005)
- "Whap-Pa" (2006)
- "Doi Străini" (2006)
- "July" (featuring Arsenium) (2007)
- "Iubirea Ca Un Drog" (2007)
- "Daun Daha" (2007)
- "Love Is Not A Reason To Cry" (March 2008) (MR & MS)
- "In One" (2008) (MR & MS)
- "Single Lady" (2009) (Dj Layla)
- "City Of Sleeping Hearts" (2010) (DJ Layla)
- "Emotion" (2011) (Sianna)
- "Broken Heart" (feat. Sianna), 2012
- "Rain Falling Down" (feat. Sianna), 2013
- "Dynamite" (2014) (Liza Fox)
- Esti Doar O (2017)
- "Lay Down" (feat. Arsenium) (2020)
