= Me and You (Jeanie Tracy album) =

Studio album by Jeanie Tracy
- Released: April 9, 1982
- Recorded: August–November 1981
- Genre: R&B, soul, funk
- Length: 39:12
- Label: Fantasy
- Producer: Nancy C. Pitts (exec. producer), Harvey Fuqua, Louis Small, Gregg Crockett, Sylvester

Jeanie Tracy chronology
Me and You (1982)	It's My Time (1995)

Me and You is the debut album by Jeanie Tracy, released in 1982 on Fantasy Records.

== Background ==
In 1981, Tracy secured a recording contract with Fantasy Records. She immediately began recording her debut album. In early 1982, the album's lead single was "Your Old Standby", a cover of Mary Wells's 1963 hit, was released. The release of the album Me and You soon followed. The second single "I'm Your Jeanie", which became an underground hit, would inspire Sylvester's song "Do You Wanna Funk". The third single was the album's titled-track "Me and You". The album ultimately failed to generate a mainstream audience beyond the dance clubs. Tracy stated, "We didn't know what direction to go in, so we just did a little of everything." With little success from the album, Tracy left Fantasy Records in favor of Megatone Records.

In 1984, she released the single "Sing Your Own Song", featuring "Time Bomb" on B-side, which peaked at number thirty-three on Billboard's Dance chart. The song was her first single to chart on the Billboard as well as her first release on Megatone Records.

== Track listings ==
1. "Sing Your Own Song" 4:25
2. "Your Old Standby" 4:10
3. "I Feel Like Dancing" 5:20
4. "Me and You" 4:37
5. "I'm Your Jeanie" 6:30
6. "Come Make Love to Me" 4:25
7. "I Want You" 5:20
8. "Tears On My Pillow" 4:25
