= Ron Carroll =

American DJ, singer and songwriter (1968–2025)

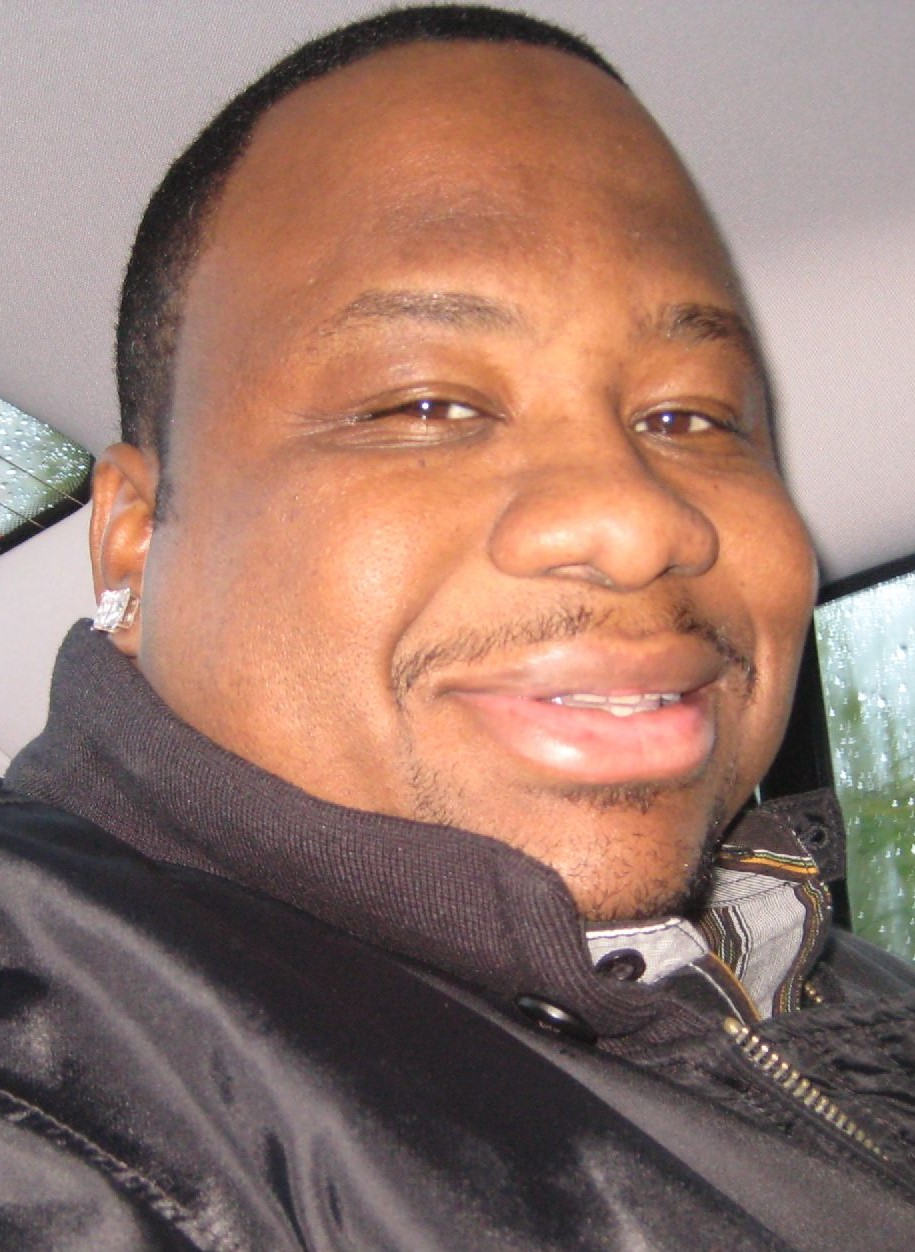
- Carroll in Amsterdam, October 2008

Background information
- Born: Ronald Michael Carroll; April 20, 1968; Chicago, Illinois, U.S.
- Died: September 21, 2025 (aged 57)
- Occupations: DJ; singer; producer; songwriter
- Instruments: Vocals
- Years active: 1994–2025

Ronald Michael Carroll (April 20, 1968 – September 21, 2025) was an American DJ, singer, songwriter, and music producer. He was primarily active on the house music circuit and openly gay. He was a proponent for the LGBTQ+ and HIV Positive communities and disclosed his own diagnosis just weeks before his death.

Carroll worked with many of house's most famous producers including E-Smoove, Maurice Joshua, Bob Sinclar, and Rod Carrillo. Carroll also produced, usually with partner Spero Pagos, for other vocalists or his own songs.

== Musical career ==
Carroll was born in Chicago in 1968. As a boy, he learned to sing while a member of his church choir. As a teenager, he was a fan of Kiss, but became interested in house music when he attended a high school dance and spent time watching the DJ perform. Carroll started performing as a DJ in the late 1980s in a club he himself opened. He released his first official record, "My Prayer", in 1993, a track produced by local producers Hula (from the Outhere Brothers), Kay Fingers, and Ron Trent.

In 1994, Carroll got his first big break when he attended the Winter Music Conference in Miami. Still an unknown outside Chicago, Carroll walked up to Louie Vega, who gave him a chance to write the lyrics to Barbara Tucker's "I Get Lifted". That allowed him an opportunity to join Mike Dunn and Byron Stingily, also in the Chicago house scene, in the Deep Soul production company as a singer, songwriter, and producer. Carroll wrote the lyrics for six tracks on The Purist, Stingily's album, and also wrote and produced the anthem "The Sermon". In 1996, he met Greek American producer Spero Pagos, and the two created MOS Productions (for Ministers Of Sound), for the UC/Afterhours label.

On the label, Carroll met Mazi Namvar, who introduced him to the European house scene leading to him taking part in the French house classics "My Love" (produced by Kluster) and "Lucky Star" (produced by Superfunk, an electronic band from Marseille, France, both released in 2000. In 2001, he opened his own label, Body Music Records. Carroll's work as a singer in Europe brought him into contact with Dutch producers Hardsoul in 2003, for whom he wrote and sang in "Back Together". Next, in 2004 was "What a Wonderful World" for Bob Sinclar and Axwell, a track that appeared on Sinclar's 2004 album Enjoy.

In 2024, Carroll began collaborating with Rod Carrillo which produced some of his last releases: "Get Up", "Lifted in Sound", "Get On The Floor" and "Lost" Carroll died from a heart attack on September 21, 2025, at the age of 57.

== Discography ==
=== Albums ===
- 2006 Chicago

=== Singles ===
Ron Carroll

- 1993 "My Prayer" (with Hula, Kay Fingers and Ron Trent)
- 1993 "A New Day" (with Hula and Kay Fingers)
- 1995 "Pressing On"
- 1999 "Gimme Love" (with Spero Pagos)
- 1999 "Soundz" (with Spero Pagos)
- 1999 "Stronger" (with Mazi)
- 2001 "Angel"
- 2001 "Get With Him" (with Church Is One Foundation)
- 2001 "Take Me Up" (with E-Smoove)
- 2002 "Live in Me"
- 2002 "Natural"
- 2002 "Can't Give Up" (with Shawn Christopher)
- 2003 "Sexy Thing"
- 2004 "Come Into My Life" (with Richard Grey)
- 2004 "World of Love" ( With Bob Sinclar)
- 2005 "Classical Moments In Time" (with Derrick May)
- 2005 "The Only Way Is Up" (with Disco Darlings)
- 2006 "Just Got Paid"
- 2006 "Weak", with Jjah
- 2007 "Come Into My Life 2007" (with Richard Grey)
- 2007 "All My Life" (with Jazmina)
- 2007 "The Nike Song"
- 2010 "Lucky Star"
- 2010 "In Love with a DJ" (with CeCe Peniston)
- 2010 "Freak E.P."
- 2013 "Bang Bang (Explode 3)" (with DS&F & Ceresia)
- 2018 "It's You" (with Julien Scalzo)
- 2024 "Lifted In Sound (with Rod Carrillo)
- 2024 "Get Up" (with Rod Carrillo)
- 2025 "Get On The Floor" (with Rod Carrillo)
- 2025 "Same Vibration" (with Soleil Carrillo & Kellari)
- 2025 "Lost"

RC Groove/RC Groove Project

- 1998 "Sermon One EP", as RC Groove Project (with Mike Dunn)
- 2000 "The Sermon", as RC Groove Project
- 2001 "Nothin' But Funk", as RC Groove
- 2001 "Brighter Day", as 'RC Groove Project
- 2001 "The RC Groove Project #2", as RC Groove Project
- 2002 "Strings", as RC Groove
- 2002 "High Again", as RC Groove (with Lady D)
- 2003 "Believe", as RC Groove Project (with Dawn Tallman)
- 2003 "Spirit Of The Dance", as RC Groove
- 2003 "Superfreaque Music", as RC Groove (with Dino Vulpitta)

Testament

- 1999 "It Is Well"
- 2000 "Work It Out" (with Spero Pagos)
- 2000 "We Need Love" (with Robert Collado)
- 2003 "Sun Is Shining"
- 2005 "World Harmony"

Other aliases

- 1998 "My Way", as Subculture (with Rick Garcia and Lejuan)
- 1998 "Feel It, Move It, Shout It", as Ron Carroll's Black Pearl (with Paul Walton)
- 2000 "Beautiful", as Ground Level (with Spero Pagos and Rheji)
- 2000 "Got to Hold On", as Ministers Of Sound (with Spero Pagos and Paul Walton)
- 2001 "Someday", as Ground Level (with Spero Pagos and Rheji)
- 2001 "Can You Feel It", as Subculture (with Rick Garcia)
- 2001 "Wait", as The RC Connection (with Mazi and Jackie Haywood)
- 2002 "Deep in My Soul", as Shay Coco Butta (with Josh Collins)

Production

- 2000 Rochele Fleming - "It's Not Over"
- 2001 Curtis Harman - "Call Me", with Josh Collins
- 2001 CeCe Peniston - "My Boo"
- 2005 Sunny Larican - "Always"
- 2005 Trina Tru Luv - "True Love"
- 2005 Vicki B - "Something Must Change"
- 2005 Shawn Christopher - "You Can Make It"
- 2005 Melba Moore - "My Heart Belongs To You"
- 2006 Mona Lisa - "Dancin'"
- 2007 Ce Ce Peniston - "I'm Feelin' U", with DJ Fudge

Appears on

- 1993 House Culture - "Let The Music Set U Free"
- 1996 Blak Beat Niks - "Ooohhh"
- 1997 Michi Lange - "The Only Way Is Up"
- 1998 DJ Pope - "Waymaker"
- 1999 Rick Garcia - "Dancefloor"
- 2000 Superfunk - "Lucky Star"
- 2000 Kluster - "My Love"
- 2000 Rick Garcia - "Dancefloor"
- 2000 DJ Bam Bam - "Soundz"
- 2002 Audio Soul Project - "Community"
- 2002 Mazi - "This Feeling" (with Josh Collins)
- 2003 Peter Presta - "Changes"
- 2003 Hardsoul - "Back Together"
- 2004 Bob Sinclar - "Wonderful World"
- 2004 Superfunk Inc. - "Promised Land"
- 2004 Superfunk Inc. - "Lover"
- 2004 Bob Sinclar - "World of Love"
- 2005 Abstract Beating System - "Vibes"
- 2006 Hardsoul - "My Life" (with Sven Vigee)
- 2007 Bob Sinclar - "Everybody Movin'" (with Mz Toni)
- 2007 Audio Soul Project - "Community 2007"
- 2008 Bob Sinclar & Axwell - "What a Wonderful World"
- 2015 Dimitri Vangelis & Wyman - "Running"
- 2016 Felicity - "Heaven"
