= Eric Redd =

Background information
- Born: Eric Redd
- Origin: Inglewood, California, United States
- Genres: Rock, pop rock, dance, EDM, house, R&B, soul
- Occupations: Musician, songwriter, choreographer
- Instrument: Vocals
- Years active: 1977–present
- Labels: Jive, Carrillo
- Website: ericredd.com

Eric Redd is an American recording artist, songwriter and dancer. He was a regular on Soul Train before moving into music. He had a dance music hit in 2019 with "Push", "Right Time" in 2017 and "Breathe" in 2010. Redd was also lead vocalist with the classic rock band, California Transit Authority (CTA).

== Early years ==
A self proclaimed ‘Street Dancer’ by the time he was 16, Redd had become a regular on Soul Train, one of the most Popular American music-dance television shows in history. Redd and his partner, Cheryl Song, were two of the show's most popular dancers. Because of this popularity, they were invited to compete in the American Bandstand dance contest. Since the two programs rarely co-mingled dancers, this was a singular honor.

== Career ==
After graduating high school, Redd won a scholarship to the California Institute of the Arts, where he studied dance. Then, after turning down a position in The Alvin Ailey American Dance Theater's second company, he spent a year with the Winnipeg Contemporary Dancers before moving to Paris, where he joined Roland Petit's Ballet de Marseilles.

After touring with the company for two years, he left to appear in the original German cast of Cats. During much of this time, he was known as "Erique" Redd, as there was already another Eric Redd in the European entertainers' union.

He next appeared in another Andrew Lloyd Webber production, the London production of Starlight Express. It was there, in 1991, that Redd turned increasingly to singing, landing a contract on Jive Records UK and releasing a club-friendly cover of Paul Simon's "50 Ways to Leave a Lover." After two years with Jive Records, Redd, who realized the label was concentrating only on rap, decided to head back to California, where he wrote and recorded music for television, served as a music supervisor for Black Entertainment Television (BET)'s new programming department. He also performed, toured, and recorded with artists such as k.d. lang, Sara Lee (then of the B-52's) and Ani DiFranco.

In 2008, he completed his first full-length album, Across the Water, for German label White Noise. Virtually simultaneously, he was asked by Danny Seraphine, the original drummer of the band Chicago, to replace Larry Braggs as the lead vocalist in California Transit Authority (CTA), due to Braggs' heavy schedule with Tower of Power. Seraphine named his new band to mimic his first band's original name, Chicago Transit Authority.

Redd's first foray into classic rock was complemented by his return to club music. His house and electro-infused single "Breathe" produced by Rod Carrillo for (Carrillo Music) reached number #32 in the Billboard dance music charts in the 2010, and featured a video directed by famed visual editor, Dustin Robertson (Madonna, Lady Gaga)

His follow-up to "Breathe," a six-song EP titled 54 for Carrillo Music, was released in 2011. In 2012, Redd had the honor of being the featured vocalist with the band The Source, opening for Stevie Wonder at the inaugural celebration for Barack Obama.

In 2013, he turned to a more Electronic meets RnB sound and released the full-length CD titled Pure. During that same time he was featured with his penned track "Go On" on the newly released C.T.A. full-length CD, titled Sacred Ground. He ended that stellar year with his songs "54" and "How could I break (my own heart)", added to the feature film Bert and Arnie's Guide to Friendship, released in theaters worldwide.

In 2017, his single "Right Time" broke into the Billboard Dance Club Play Chart. This was Redd's second dance club hit produced by Rod Carrillo.

In 2019, Redd released "Push" and garnished overwhelming success from the House Music community. "Push" earned positions in the Top 20 Soulful House Sales Chart and Top 100 Overall Sales Chart on the music download site Traxsource.com. "Push" was added to the Traxsource Essential House Playlist, while simultaneously entering the Billboard Dance Music Chart. "Push" was produced with Rod Carrillo in Panama City, Panama.

During the pandemic of 2020, Redd released 6 various house music singles with different labels while beginning work on a one man show due to premiere in 2023 at the European Fringe Festivals.

In 2021, he released a collaboration with US dance music producer, DJ Czezre entitled, “Maybe you want to be with me” on King Street Records “House Grooves” series. The single immediately jumped into the top of the Beatport and Traxsource Soulful house charts and ended the year with the track chosen one of the Finest NY house tracks of 2021 at King Street.

== Discography ==
- 1986: Cats; German cast album (Polydor)
- 1988: Starlight Express, Japan/Australia cast CD
- 1991: "50 Ways to Leave Your Lover" (Jive Records)
- 2000: Sara Lee, "Make it Beautiful" (Righteous Babe Records)
- 2001: Gail Ann Dorsey, "I used to Be" (Independent Release)
- 2008: Across the Water (White Noise Music)
- 2011: 54 (Carrillo Music)
- 2013: California Transit Authority, "Sacred Ground" (Independent Release)
- 2016: Liam Keegan "You Can Feel It" (Carrillo Music)
- 2016: Billie Williams "Billie Williams" (Independent Release)
- 2016: Simi Stone "Extended Play" (Independent Release)
- 2019: "Everyday People" with James Hurr, Valiant Kings (Sirup Records/Pinkstar Disco)
- 2019: “Deep Inside” with Menini and Viani (Comb Records)
- 2020: “Move It, Groove it” with DJ Fenix (Say Wow Music)
- 2020: “Gimme That Funk” Frederick/Kusse-Fibi (Toolroom records)
- 2021: "Maybe you want to be with me” with DJ Czezre, House Grooves Vol.8 (King Street Records)
- 2021: "Finest NY house 2021 pt 2" (King Street Records)
