= DJ Layla =

Romanian or Moldovan DJ

DJ Layla is a Romanian music project, produced by Radu Sirbu (O-Zone) and Sianna. The 2009 single "Single Lady" (feat. Romanian singer Alissa) won the "Most airplayed songs 2009" at Radio România Actualităţi Awards and reached the top 40 charts in Romania, Moldova and Russia.

== Discography ==
=== Albums ===
- 2010 - Single Lady
- 2021 - Focus On Music

=== Singles ===
- 2008 - "Single Lady" (feat. Alissa)
- 2009 - "City Of Sleeping Hearts" (feat. Dee-Dee & Radu Sârbu)
- 2010 - "Planet Mars" (feat. Dee-Dee & Radu Sârbu)
- 2010 - "Drive" (feat. Dee-Dee & Radu Sârbu)
- 2011 - "Party Boy" (feat. Armina Rosi & Radu Sârbu)
- 2011 - "I Miss You Baby" (feat. Alex Karbouris)
- 2012 - "I'm your angel" (feat. Sianna & Radu Sârbu)
- 2013 - "Searching 4 love" (feat. Lorina & Radu Sârbu)
- 2013 - "Born to Fly" (feat. Dee-Dee & Radu Sârbu)
- 2014 - "Without Your Love" (feat. Sianna)
- 2015 - "Kill Me Or Kiss Me" (feat. NesteA)
- 2015 - "I Need LOVE" (feat. Sianna)
- 2016 - "Don't Blame my Heart (feat. Lorina)
- 2016 - "Don't Go" (feat. Malina Tanase)
- 2016 - "In Your Eyes" (feat. Sianna)
- 2017 - "Ocean Of Lies" (feat. Mihai Popistasu)
- 2018 - "Just Call Me To Say" (feat. Malina Tanase)
- 2018 - "Love Is Calling" (feat. Sianna)
- 2019 - "City of Love"
