= Julissa Veloz =

Dominican-American recording artist and songwriter

Julissa Alexandria Veloz
- Born: September 8, 1988 (age 38); Newark, New Jersey, U.S.
- Genre: Rock
- Occupation: Musician

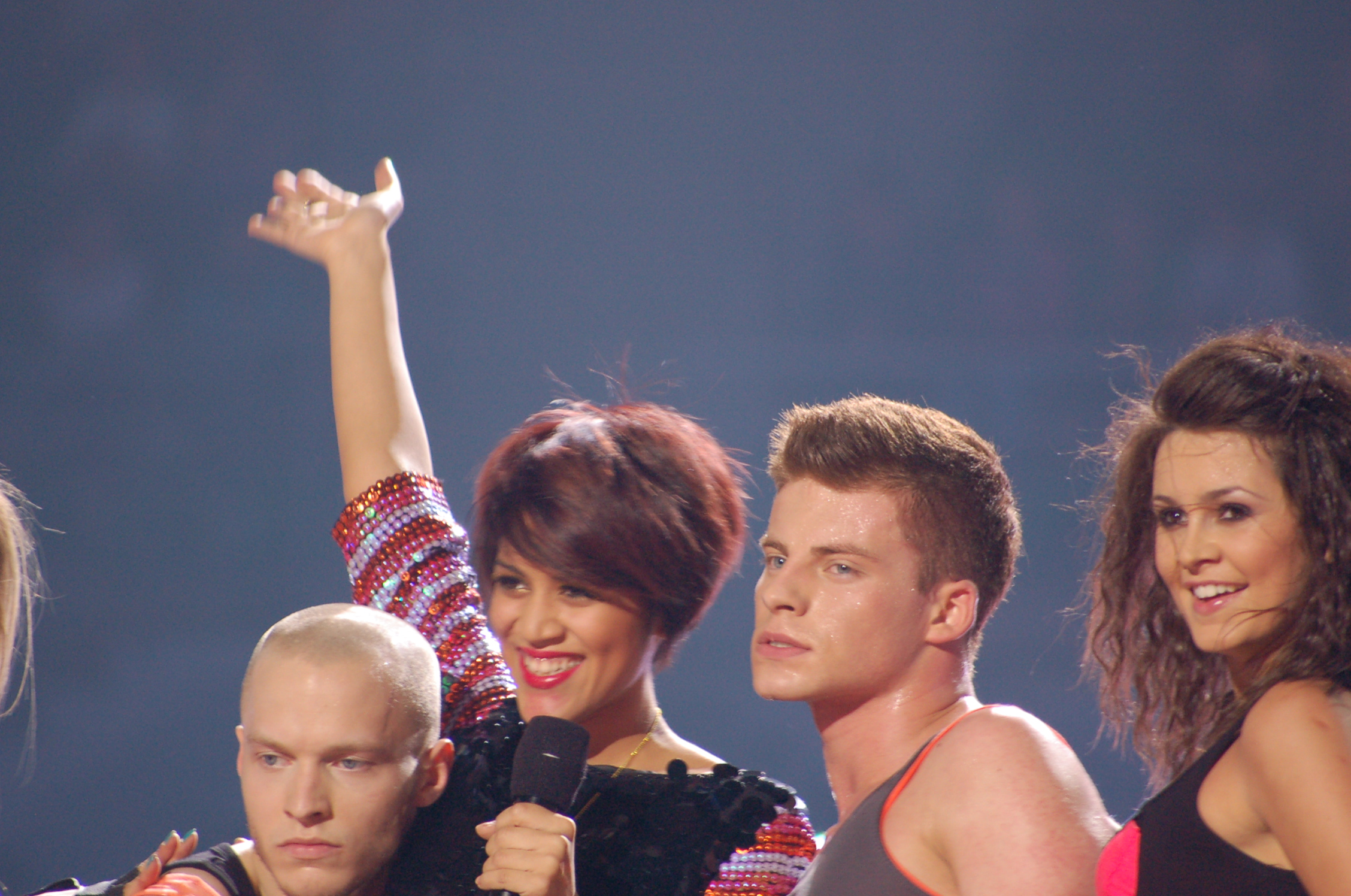
Julissa Veloz performing at the Bydgoszcz Hit Festival in Poland.

Julissa Alexandria Veloz (born in Newark, New Jersey) is a Dominican-American recording artist, producer and songwriter. She first achieved fame as "Tiara Girl" in Season 8 of American Idol. After being eliminated as a finalist, Veloz was signed to record label Carrillo Music owned by Rod Carrillo and achieved global success with debut single, "Take Control" which topped the Billboard Dance Chart at #8.

In 2010, Veloz released her debut single, "Take Control", which peaked at number eight on the Billboard Dance/Club Play chart, achieving success in countries like Poland, Belarus, Italy, Germany, Austria, the UK and in the US. That October, Veloz released her second single, "Predator", which climbed to #19, followed by singles "Mayhem," (US Dance #19) "It Would," and "Very Brady Day". In 2015, her collaboration with Ralphi Rosario "La Jungla" rose Billboard Dance Chart to #5.

Veloz announced her Indie Rock band "Color The Lion" along with guitarist Jesse Girardi and drummer Kevin Kerr under her label Leyline Records in 2015. Their debut EP, "1s & 3s" hit the iTunes Top Alternative EP's & Singles Chart next to bands like Incubus and Imagine Dragons. After taking a hiatus to focus on family and personal obligations, Veloz is releasing her latest project with Color the Lion bandmate and husband under the artist title, "JNDJ". Their first release, 'MSKOFF' is set to release 4/11/2022.

== Biography ==
Veloz was born in Newark, New Jersey. By the age of 10, Veloz began taking lessons with opera singer Nadine Herman at the Newark School of the Arts. During her vocal training, Veloz performed at several affairs with CEOs and Presidents of corporations and was recommended to attend Juilliard by pianist Dalton Baldwin. She earned several music scholarships, many of which she was the first vocalist to receive. Veloz expanded her artistic reach by writing several monologues which she later performed with her cast in the Broadway of New Jersey, the New Jersey Performing Arts Center.

Veloz left opera to pursue R&B and pop with music producer/teacher Gerry Williams, who worked with artists such as Justin Timberlake, Celine Dion and Mandy Moore. During this time, Veloz co-wrote and recorded her first two demos, "Far from Me" and "Feel the Music" to release to the public. After disappointing results, Veloz decided to audition for American Idol and made it to the final rounds before being cut due to laryngitis.

One of her family members met label owner and DJ/producer, Rod Carrillo, in 2009, who signed her to his label, Carrillo Music, and her first single "Take Control" was recorded then released in February 2010. The song rose up the Billboard Dance chart to #8. She released her second single, “Predator”, in October 2010. In 2011, she released "Sweet Sugar Poison" and "Mayhem" singles. "Mayhem" reach #19 on the Billboard Dance Chart and got support from iHeartRadio on Club Phusion, Music Choice, Aol Radio as well as over radio support in 20 other markets. In 2012, she released "It Would" and "Very Brady Day."

In 2015, her collaboration with Ralphi Rosario "La Jungla" gained a lot of attention and rose Billboard Dance Chart to #5. This was her second Top 10 record since 2010 with "Take Control".

== Discography ==
- "MSKOFF" with JNDJ and Color the Lion (2022)
- "Smile" with David Heartbreak & Chooky (2018)
- "La Jungla" with Ralphi Rosario (2015)
- "Tickle My" with Head Assembly (2015)
- "Light it Up" (2014)
- "Sunset to Sunrise" (2013)
- "What Cha Feelin'" with Liam Keegan & Kae Lou (2013)
- "Rock The Party" with Bouvier & Barona (2013)
- "Zimmee (Give It All)" (2012)
- "2 of Us" with Jesse McFaddin (2012)
- "Different" with Trevor Simpson (2012)
- "Overload" (2012)
- "Very Brady Day" (2012)
- "It Would" (2012)
- Mayhem (2011)
- Sweet Sugar Poison (2011)
- Me Against Me with Gabry Ponte (2011)
- Take Control (2010)
- Predator (2010)

== Writing/Production ==
- "MSKOFF" with JNDJ and Color the Lion (2022)
- "Smile" with David Heartbreak & Chooky (2018)
- "La Jungla" with Ralphi Rosario (2015)
- "Lover and A Friend" - Color The Lion (2015)
- "Planet Earth" - Color The Lion (2015)
- "Wait For Me" - Color The Lion (2015)
- "French Toast" - Color The Lion (2015)
- "Karma" - Color The Lion (2015)
- "Tickle My.." - with Rod Carrillo and Peter Barona
- "Hurts" - Kelsey B. as Carvelo with Rod Carrillo (2013)
- "Rock The Party" with Bouvier & Barona (2013)
- "Get Away" Natalia Flores (2011)
