= Hardsoul =

Dutch house music duo

Hardsoul is a duo of house music producers and DJs from the Netherlands, made up of the brothers Rogier (DJ Roog) and Greg van Bueren.

== Biography ==
Founded in 1997, Hardsoul began releasing music on Soulfuric Recordings, a label owned by Marc Pomeroy and Brian Tappert. This led to another release on Soulfuric, "Sweatshop", in 2003, before graduating to Defected Records' sublabel ITH Records, where they released "Backtogether", a vocal anthem sung by Ron Carroll, in 2003. It received airplay on mainstream radio, and peaked at #60 in the UK Singles Chart.

== Discography ==
- 1998 "Do What I Gotta Do"
- 1999 "Fight The Feeling/Your Last Dance"
- 2000 "Late Night Sessions Vol. 1"
- 2001 "Where Did Our Love Go", with Forrest Thomas
- 2001 "La Pasion De Gozar"
- 2001 "All Night Long", with Rose Stigter
- 2002 "Caracho"
- 2002 "Never Gonna Stop", with The Soul Hustlers
- 2003 "Sweatshop", with New Cool Collective
- 2003 "6 Dah/Former Destiny"
- 2003 "Tricky Bizniz #1"
- 2003 "Back Together", with Ron Carroll
- 2004 "Committed"
- 2004 "Plastiko EP"
- 2004 "The Hardsoul EP"
- 2004 "Lapoema", with Olav Basoski
- 2005 "Bounsoun", with New Cool Collective
- 2005 "Über", as Hardsoul presents Roog & Greg
- 2006 "No Man", with Shaun Escoffery
- 2006 "Don't Let Love Weigh You Down", with Amma
- 2006 "Deep Inside"
- 2006 "My Life", with Ron Carroll and Sven Vigee
- 2007 "Your Mind Is Twisted", with Jeroenski
- 2009 "Shed My Skin" with Erick E as HouseQuake, featuring Anita Kelsey
