= Anthem of House =

Single by Rosabel featuring Terri B!
- Released: April 7, 2017
- Recorded: 2017
- Length: 6:54
- Label: Carrillo Music
- Songwriters: Ralphi Rosario; Abel Aguilera; Terri Bjerre
- Producers: Ralphi Rosario; Abel Aguilera; Rod Carrillo

Rosabel singles chronology
"Livin' for Your Love (Your Love)" (2017)	"Anthem of House" (2017)

"Anthem of House" is a song by the American electronic/house duo Rosabel, featuring vocals by American singer-songwriter Terri B!, who recorded the vocals in Germany. The track, which celebrates the house music genre, reached number one on Billboard's Dance Club Songs chart in its June 3, 2017 issue, giving Rosabel their seventh chart topper, and Terri B! her third.

== Track listing ==
Digital download

1. "Anthem of House" (Rosabel Club Mix) – 6:54
2. "Anthem of House" (Ralphi Rosario Big Room Mix) – 7:37
3. "Anthem of House" (Rod Carrillo Club Mix) – 7:41
4. "Anthem of House" (Ralphi Rosario Vox Dub) – 7:01
5. "Anthem of House" (Sol N Beef Club Mix) – 7:31

Digital download – The Deep Mixes

1. "Anthem of House" (Liam Keegan Club Mix) – 5:35
2. "Anthem of House" (Alyson Calagna Club Mix) – 5:35
3. "Anthem of House" (Alyson Calagna Big Room Mix) – 6:28
4. "Anthem of House" (Alyson Calagna Dub Mix) – 5:35
5. "Anthem of House" (Jeff Morgan & Terri B! Club Mix) – 5:34
6. "Anthem of House" (Rosario Voguer's Ball Mix) – 6:24
