= Computers in Entertainment =

- Language: English
- Edited by: Newton Lee

Publication details
- History: 2003–2018
- Publisher: Association for Computing Machinery
- Frequency: Quarterly

Standard abbreviations
- ISO 4: Comput. Entertain.

Indexing
- ISSN: 1544-3574
- LCCN: 2003212230
- OCLC no.: 712803318

Links
- Journal homepage; Online archive

Computers in Entertainment was an online academic journal and magazine that featured both peer-reviewed articles as well as news content covering entertainment technology, products, services, and notable people. The editor-in-chief was Newton Lee and the journal was published from 2003 to 2018 by the Association for Computing Machinery. From 2009 to 2011, Adrian David Cheok and Masa Inakage were co-editors-in-chief together with Lee.

== Abstracting and indexing ==
The journal is abstracted and indexed in:

- EBSCO databases
- Ei Compendex
- Emerging Sources Citation Index
- Inspec
- ProQuest databases,
- Scopus
