= It's My Time (Jeanie Tracy album) =

Studio album by Jeanie Tracy
- Released: June 28, 1995
- Recorded: 1994–1995
- Genre: Electronica, house
- Label: Pulse-8
- Producer: Band of Gypsies

Jeanie Tracy chronology
| Me and You (1982) | It's My Time (1995) | Making New Friends - EP (2015) |

It's My Time is the second studio album by Jeanie Tracy.

== Background ==
In 1994, Tracy signed to the English electronic dance music record label Pulse-8 Records. In August 1994, she released "If This Is Love" as the lead single from forthcoming album. She follow-up with the release of another single "Do You Believe In The Wonder" in November 1994. In March 1995, she released "It's My Time". In June 1995, Tracy released her second album It's My Time. The album never saw a release in the United States.

The album's fourth single "It's A Man's Man's Man's World", a cover version of the James Brown hit, featured a collaboration with singer Bobby Womack. The single peaked at number seventy-three on the UK Singles chart. "Crying In My Sleep" was released as the album's final single in 1995.

== Track listings ==
1. "If This Is Love"
2. "Do You Believe in the Wonder"
3. "It's a Man's Man's World" (featuring Bobby Womack) (Fast)
4. "It's My Time"
5. "Feel The Need"
6. "I'm Gonna Get You"
7. "Work It"
8. "Do You Wanna Be
9. "Free Like a Bird"
10. "Call My Name"
11. "Do The Right Thing"
12. "Crying In My Sleep"
13. "It's a Man's Man's World"
