= Terri B! =

American musician

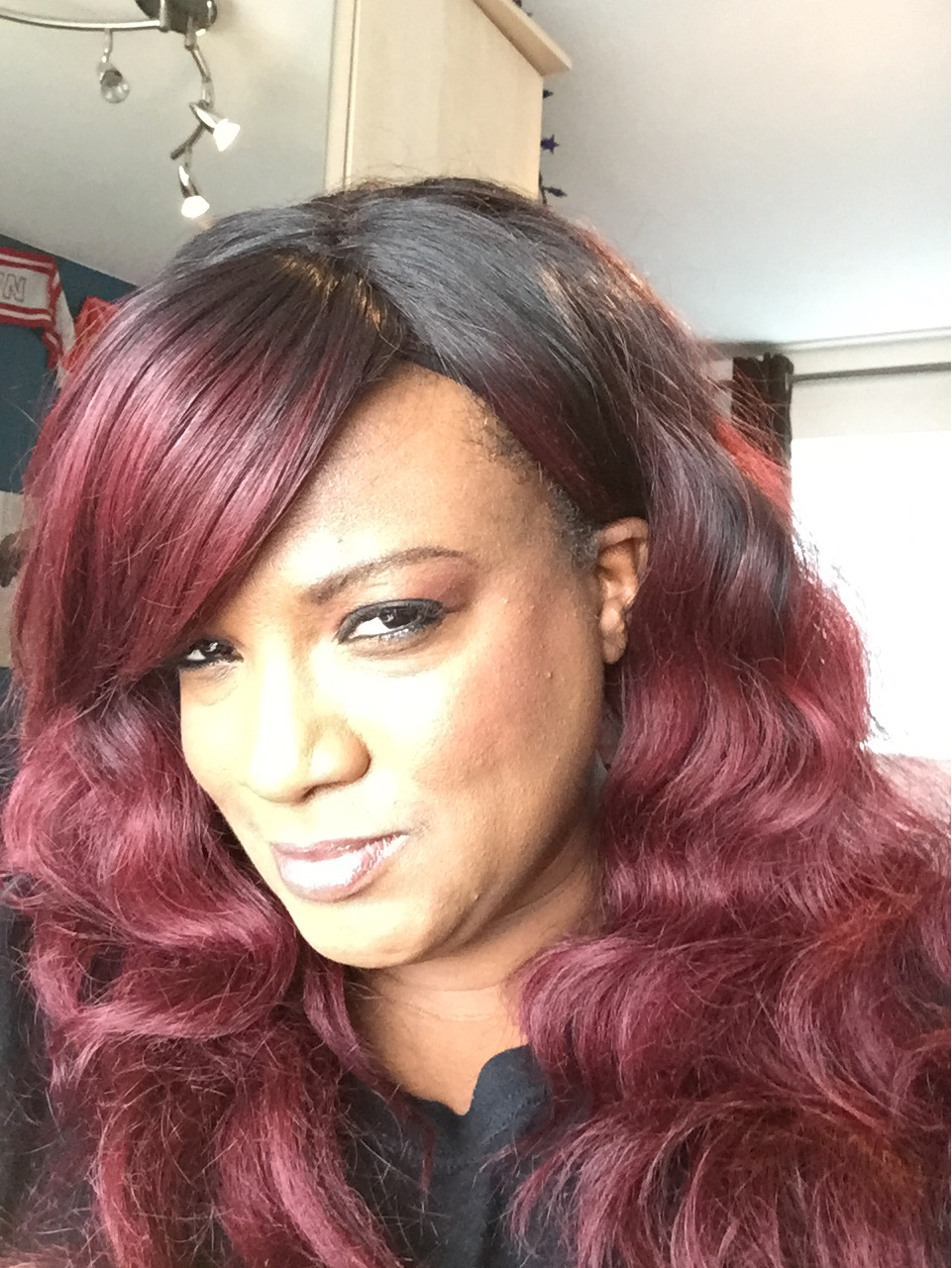
- Terri B! in 2015

Background information
- Also known as: Terri B!
- Born: Terri Elaine Bjerre
- Genres: Dance; pop
- Occupations: Singer, songwriter, producer, DJ
- Years active: 1997–present
- Label: Carrillo Music
- Website: www.terrib.com

Terri Elaine Bjerre, known professionally as Terri B!, is an American Electronic dance singer, composer, producer and DJ.

== Career ==
Terri Bjerre began her career in the band 2 Eivissa, who reached #1 on the Spanish Top 100 with the classic "Oh la la la", in 1997. Since 2013, the publishing interest of Terri Bjerre's catalog has been represented by Reservoir Media Management. Her long career in dance music spanned more than 1,000 remixes of her voice and 400 singles. In 2015, a feature with Swedish Dj Act Cazzette on the single "Blind Heart", went to the Billboard dance #1 position, and was co-written by Terri B! In 2015, she was the first artist to take the #1 spot with two titles, "Big Fun", and "Blind Heart" as a featured artist. To date Blind Heart has streamed more than 40 million times on spotify and was used as the North American Ueber Campaign song. Bjerre is one of only six artists to have two numbers ones in 2015 in the Billboard Club Songs chart. Bjerre has collaborated with some of the world's most known deejays including, Laidback Luke, Roger Sanchez, Bingo Players, Dj Antoine, Cazzette, and Thomas Gold. She has shared stages with David Guetta, Roger Sanchez, Tocadisco, Gromee, Dj Antoine and more.

Bjerre has also written several songs for other artists. She wrote "Perfect Love" for pop artist Lutrica McNeal; it made it to the Top Ten in Sweden in 2002, No. 22 in Austria, No. 13 in Norway, and No. 20 in Finland. She penned the songs "Call Me" and "Paradise" for German pop artist Sarah Connor's Naughty But Nice LP (released under X-cell Records in Berlin). She penned songs for Chris Norman of Smokey, earning a Top Ten in Germany with the winning song from the Comeback Show, "Amazing", co-written with Johan Boback and Joacim Nilsson of Kickshaw. She penned music with the Danish pop singer, Medina, on the titles "Lonely", "The One", "6 A.M", "Selfish", and "Sundown". She is currently still working in the studio with Medina on her upcoming CD in Copenhagen. It received a gold status in Europe from EMI Records. Bjerre wrote the single "Lonely", however the sleeve was incorrect crediting Lisa Greene for Bjerre's share. This has since been corrected.

In May 2017, her latest collaboration with Ralphi Rosario and Abel Aguilera under their Rosabel alias, garnished Terri B! her third Billboard Dance Chart #1 single with "Anthem of House" on Carrillo Music.

== Selected discography ==
- 2022 - Kuyano & Terri B! - Put It On Me - Kontor Records
- 2020 - Kuyano & Terri B! - Missing You - Future House Cloud
- 2019 - Julien Scalzo & Terri B! - Freedom Song - Let There Be House Records
- 2017 - Rosabel & Terri B! - "Anthem of House" - Carrillo Music
- 2016 – Olwik & Terri B! – "Fight No More", Sony/LINC Sweden (Swedish Dance Charts #30)
- 2015 – TERRI B! – "I'm Coming Back" (Lifted, Carrillo, Sony. Happy Music, Suraya) (iTunes Luxembourg Dance #6, Polish Dance Chart top 50)
- 2015 – "Laidback Luke", Moska ft. Terri B!, (Get It Right/ Beatport #14)
- 2015 – Cazzette ft. Terri B! – "Blind Heart", PRMD Music / #1 Billboard Hot Dance Club Songs
- 2014 – Paul Ridney & Terri B! – "What Can i Do", Pukka Up, UK, #1 Tracksource Progressive
- 2009 – John Dahback, Diaz, Young Rebel feat. Terri B – "Can't Slow Down"
