= Altar (Brazilian duo) =

Brazilian house music duo

- Origin: Brazil
- Genres: House music
- Years active: 2000-present
- Members: Macau; VMC

Altar is a house music duo of Brazilian producers and DJs Macau and VMC. Formed in 2000, the duo began receiving recognition in nightclubs in 2003 after the release of their single "Sexercise". A collaboration with vocalist Jeanie Tracy, "Party People", became their first number-one hit on the U.S. Hot Dance Club Play chart in early 2007.

== See also ==
- List of number-one dance hits (United States)
- List of artists who reached number one on the US Dance chart
