= Rosabel =

American musical duo

- Origin: Chicago, Illinois, U.S.
- Genres: Electronic, house
- Years active: 1990s–present
- Labels: Carrillo Music
- Members: Ralphi Rosario; Abel Aguilera

Rosabel is an American house music duo consisting of DJ/producers Ralphi Rosario from Chicago, Illinois and Abel Aguilera from Miami, Florida.

Already successful club/dance artists individually, the duo has hit number one on the Hot Dance Music/Club Play chart five times. Their first single was "La Puta" in 1995 which was also remixed into a reggaeton mix on DJ Nelson & DJ Goldy's Xtassy Reggae, released on September 20, 2000. 2000's "Don't You Want My Love" featured vocalist Debbie Jacobs-Rock. In 2001, Rosabel scored two top 10 club hits with "The Power" featuring Jeanie Tracy which peaked at number one and a remix of Jennifer Holliday's "And I'm Telling You I'm Not Going" which peaked at number 6 on the Hot Dance Music/Club Play chart. In 2002, they spent a week at number one with "That Sound". Rosabel's third number one hit came in 2004, shortly after the release of the single "Cha Cha Heels" featuring Jeanie Tracy on lead vocals. Their fifth number one, "Rhythm Intoxication", came in 2006. "Cha Cha Heels" was later featured in the sixth season of So You Think You Can Dance in a cha-cha-cha choreograph by Jean-Marc Genereux, danced to by Jakob Karr and Ashleigh Di Lello. In September 2010, the duo released the single "C'Mon Get Funky" featuring Tamara Wallace, which peaked at number 2. They reteamed with Tamara in 2011 for "Let Me Be Myself" which peaked at number 7 in February 2012. They were nominated for a 2012 Grammy Award for their remix of Rihanna's "Only Girl in the World" in the Best Remixed Recording, Non-Classical Category.

In 2016, Rosabel achieved their seventh Billboard Dance number one single with "Livin' for Your Love (Your Love)" featuring the vocals of singer Jeanie Tracy on Carrillo Music.

In 2019, the duo announced their first ever studio album named The Album. Rosabel's 14-track album features singers Jeanie Tracy, Terri Bjerre and Tamara Wallace. The duo reunited with Rod Carrillo at Carrillo Music to oversee The Album and shortly after, Rosabel announced a tour in support for their new music.

Upon its release, The Album charted in the top 10 of the Billboard Dance/Electronic Sales chart.

== Discography ==
=== Albums ===
- The Album (2019)

=== Singles ===
Year	Song	U.S. Club/Dance	U.S. Dance Airplay	U.S. Dance Singles Sales
1995	"La Puta"	—	—	—
2000	"Don't You Want My Love"	1	—	28
2001	"The Power" (with Jeanie Tracy)	1	—	—
2001	"And I'm Telling You I'm Not Going"	6	—	5
2002	"That Sound"	1	5	—
2004	"Cha Cha Heels" (with Jeanie Tracy)	1	—	9
2006	"Rhythm Intoxication"	1	—	—
2008	"Looking 4 Men" (feat. Tamara Wallace)	20	—	—
2011	"C'mon Get Funky" (featuring Tamara Wallace)	2	—	—
2012	"Let Me Be Myself" (featuring Tamara Wallace)	7	—	—
2014	"Stand Strong" (featuring Jeanie Tracy)	5	—	—
2016	"Livin' for Your Love (Your Love)" (featuring Jeanie Tracy)	1	—	—
2017	"Anthem of House" (with Terri B!)	1	—	—
2017	"Freak" (featuring Tamara Wallace)	4	—	—

== See also ==
- List of number-one dance hits (United States)
- List of artists who reached number one on the US Dance chart
