= Entertainment technology =

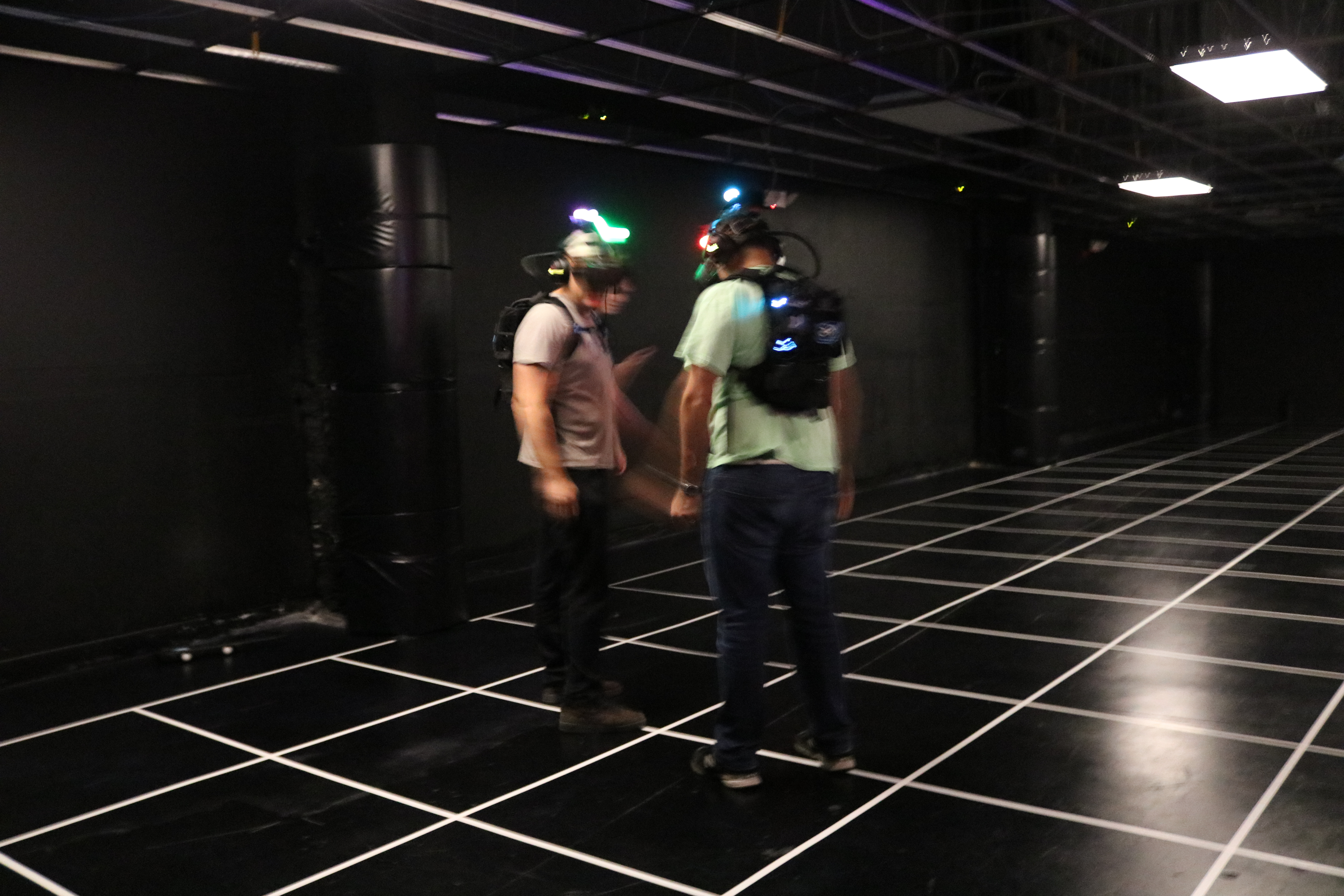
This is a virtual reality example, which is part of entertainment technology.

Entertainment technology is the discipline of using manufactured or created components to enhance or make possible any sort of entertainment experience. Because entertainment categories are so broad, and because entertainment models the world in many ways, the types of implemented technology are derived from a variety of sources. Thus, in theatre, for example, entertainment technology practitioners must be able to design and construct scenery, install electrical systems, build clothing, use motors if there is scenery automation, and provide plumbing (if functioning kitchen fixtures are required, or if "singing in the rain"). In this way, the entertainment technology field intersects with most other types of technology.

Entertainment technology helps people relax and enjoy some free time. The latest technology has revolutionized daily entertainment. Old ways such as recording on records, tapes, and CDs, have made music more accessible across the world. Movies are brought into living rooms through photography, film, and video. With the emergence of computer technology, ways of being entertained have been optimized greatly. Many households are now having computers, consoles, or any other kind of hand-holding computer game. The diversity and complexity of entertainment technology will bring endless joy and convenience to people's spare time. Traditionally, entertainment technology is derived from theatrical stagecraft, and stagecraft is an important subset of the discipline. However, the rise of new types and venues for entertainment, as well as rapidly advancing technological development, has increased the range and scope of its practice.

In animation and game design, the phrase "entertainment technology" refers to the entertainment experiences made possible by the advent of primarily computer-mediated digital technologies.

== History ==
Entertainment technology dates back to at least Antiquity, with the development of tools and Automatons by Hero of Alexandria which were used to enhance and automate aspects of theatric performances.

Popular entertainment (technology) began with the invention of the phonograph by Thomas Edison, which was used to record and playback sound. This was followed by other media such as silent films, broadcast media, and different formats of pre-recorded music and other entertainment. This in turn impacted society, as this technology became a large part of everyday life and allowed people, governments, and organizations a way to communicate their ideas and creations with others.

Since the 19th century, the production, regulation, and dissemination of entertainment technology have been the core of controversies over the waft of information and cultural products. These technologies include video games, virtual worlds, online role-playing games and recreational social networking technologies. In addition, there are two fundamental emphases in the scholarly cure of entertainment technologies. At the stage of audience consumption and participation, media outlets considered as entertainment applied sciences can be discussed as the capacity for acquiring statistics and cultivating attitudes and as a "space" for interaction. At the "macro" level of and production, illustration can work to fortify modes of belonging, identity, and attitudes.

In the 1980s, consumers first adapt digital entertainment in the form of audio CDs, and then at the beginning of the 1990s, the DVD format came into people's lives, at the same time, the direct-to-home satellite had already started to provide customers with digital TV services. The satellite TV boxes that many households had at that time could be their earliest digital entertainment technology.

United States Analog television broadcast ended on June 12, 2009. Television broadcast at most of the regions in the United States and Europe turned into digital with high-definition videos and digital sound. It was a big challenge at that time to switch to digital. As the approaching to millennium years, portable mobile devices were becoming popular among consumers. iPod published by Apple in 2001 could be a good example. Being one of the icons in the twenty-first century, it was a portable digital music player and started a revolution for mobile devices. iPod could be a very personal belonging, as time passes by, such personal digital devices would have the chance to replace the usage of personal computers, TV, DVR, and old mobile phones. Under some circumstances, consumers would prefer small-screen portable digital entertainment.

== Types of entertainment technology ==
- Properties
- Costume
- Automation
- Animatronics
- Computer simulation and virtual reality
- Augmented reality and interactive environments
- High dynamic range
- Light field devices

== Future developments ==
Video streaming is becoming a huge part of society in this day and age and it is only beginning to expand. Video streaming brought in a revenue of $30.29 billion in 2016 and based on projections conducted by Research and Markets, will reach $70.05 billion in the year 2021. Challenges for development in the media industry are how to maximize content, brands, and advertising. Consumers drive this field, companies are constantly running data about consumers preferences, relationships, habits, and locations.

According to Ian Falles, CGI technology, which is known as Computer-generated Imagery, has been improved in recent years. For example, the actors who perform in the 2016 Star Wars prequel Rogue One died, and visual effects artists used motion-capture video of a stand-in reading his lines to reprise his role of Grand Moff Tarkin. Light on skins, hair, micro eye-darts, and blood flow under skins are all elements to make faces look real, which are all correlated with the re-creation of the similarities. The hologram technology will appears much more alive with the adapting of Epson projectors with "military-grade lasers'. In the future, the details of re-creation will be more focused, and artificial intelligence will be applied to CGI technology. What's more, computers will have algorithms embedded, and hours of footage will be recorded to generate human face movements.

Gaming will continue to grow in the future. Arlington, Texas was best known for its football stadium "Jerry World". While the opening of Esports Stadium Arlington, officers hope it could be the center of e-sports, and produce $1.7 billion in revenue by 2021. The largest venue in North America has 100,000 square feet, with an 80-foot-wide stage, and 2000 gamers in the world sit around one by one, their movements are shown on an 85-foot LED screen. Several other esports venues include Esports Arena Las Vegas and Esports Arena Oakland. These venues are not only designed for championships but also can be a training center for gamers to get together so that they can communicate their skills there. Esports will attract more and more young people in the future. Many traditional sports owners, such as the owner of New England Patriots and the owner of New York Mets, have invested millions of dollars in gaming franchises. They believe that engaging in esports is the engagement with millennials in the future.

Customers will not be able to recognize the slight improvements in pictures and sound when they are using TVs or other screens. There are two new technologies that will change their minds. The first technology is called immersive sound, and it is mostly used in movie theatres. Dolby Atmos, which is a 3D sound format, and is different from the traditional surrounded sound. According to the “object-based” sound, speakers are facing toward the ceiling, so that Atmos will make people feel the sound flying over their head when there is a plane on the screen. The technology has been applied to the home theater since 2014, but with a very limited number of movies and shows, because most movies and shows hadn't had those technologies embedded. The movie market finally caught up with the trend, atoms-embedded home theatre equipment is going to sell at a lower price; Apple's 4k TV, Amazon Prime Video, and Netflix all support 3D sound format streaming. Another technology is associated with the sharpest-ever picture. Many households are changing to 4K LCD TVs, while Samsung is developing new TVs which are much better than those televisions on sale, and it will change our imagination of TV. “The Wall”, which is the name of a giant TV, is 12 feet across and only a few inches thick, and it is powered by micro-LED panels, making images on TV look brighter and darker than other competing technologies. What's more, those micro-LED panels are stitched together to perform, so “the Wall” can fulfill any requirements on sizes and shapes.

Schools that offer programs or degrees in entertainment technology include:

- Carnegie Mellon University, Entertainment Technology Center
- New York City College of Technology, Department of Entertainment Technology
- University of Southern California, Entertainment Technology Center
- The University of Texas at Austin, School of Design and Creative Technologies
- Millersville University, Multidisciplinary Studies
- Tshwane University of Technology, Pretoria, South Africa
- Entertainment Technology Training, New Zealand

Currently, the only university offering a degree specifically in Entertainment Engineering and Design (EED) is the University of Nevada, Las Vegas (UNLV). Because UNLV's program is in its infancy, current entertainment technologists come from a wide variety of educational backgrounds, the most prevalent of which are theater and mechanical technology. The program provides a choice for students who want to get involved in the entertainment industry rather than pure engineering or technical theatre. The program can help students become competitive and successful in their career. They can learn to be proficient in engineering principles, new materials, and new technologies, and at the same time, they can still reach the artistic demand in the entertainment industry.

A bachelor's degree in these areas will typically have a difference of only a few specialized classes.

Traditionally, people interested in careers in this field either presented themselves as apprentices within craft unions or attended college programs in theatre technology. Although both are appropriate in limited ways, the growing world of entertainment technology encompasses many different types of performance and display environments than the theatre. To this end, newer opportunities have arisen that provide a wider educational base than these more traditional environments. An article "Rethinking Entertainment Technology Education" by John Huntington describes new teaching philosophies that resonate with the need for a richer and more flexible educational environment:

"We need to bridge the worlds of ivory-tower theatre education with the commercial world of live entertainment production. I believe this bridge would be beneficial not just to the technical students, but to the whole art of performance. When high-tech systems such as video, moving lights, computerized sound, mechanized scenery and show control are mastered by even average entertainment technicians, they can advance the state of their craft, which will allow artists to advance the state of their art."

== See also ==
- Creative technology
- Game design
- Special effects
