= Newton Lee =

American computer scientist

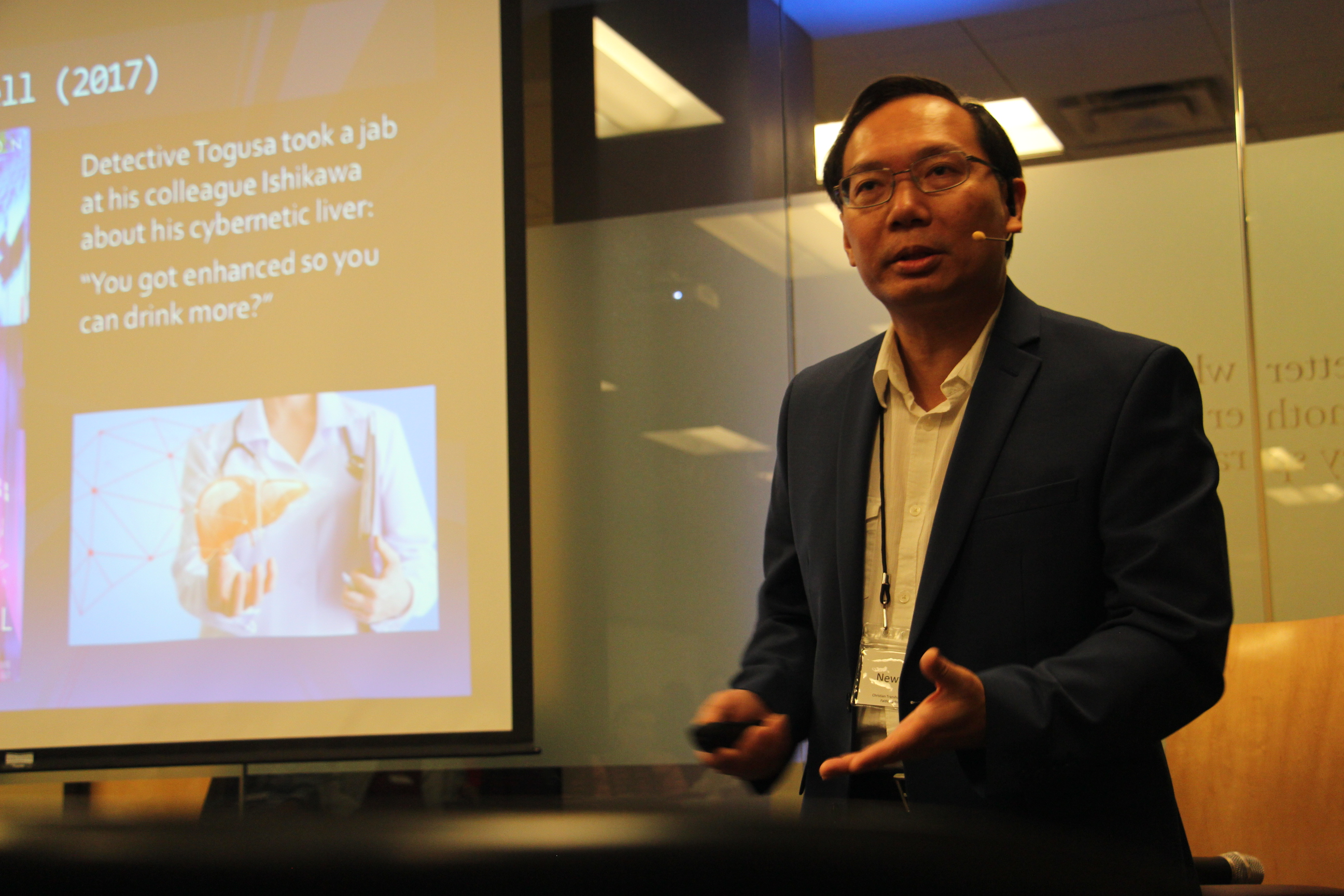
- Lee at the 2018 Christian Transhumanist Conference
- Born: British Hong Kong
- Education: FBI Citizens Academy; Virginia Tech; Vincennes University
- Scientific career
- Fields: Computer Science; Information Technology
- Workplaces: AT&T Bell Laboratories; Institute for Defense Analyses; VTLS; The Walt Disney Company; Woodbury University
- Website: newtonlee.com

Newton Lee is a computer scientist who is an author and administrator in the field of education and technology commercialization. He is known for his Total Information Awareness book series.

== Education ==
Lee holds a B.S. and M.S. in computer science from Virginia Tech, and an electrical engineering degree and honorary doctorate from Vincennes University. He was a 2021 graduate of the FBI Citizens Academy and the founding president of the Los Angeles chapter of the Virginia Tech Alumni Association.

== Career ==
Lee is editor and curator of SpringerBriefs in Computer Science, Springer International Series on Computer Entertainment and Media Technology, and Springer Encyclopedia of Computer Graphics and Games.

Previously, Lee was adjunct professor of Media Technology at Woodbury University, senior producer and lead engineer at The Walt Disney Company, research scientist at VTLS where he created the world's first annotated multimedia OPAC for the U.S. National Agricultural Library, computer science and artificial intelligence researcher at AT&T Bell Laboratories where he created Bell Labs' first-ever commercial AI tool, and research staff member at the Institute for Defense Analyses conducting military-standard Ada research for the United States Department of Defense (DoD).

In 2003, Lee founded the nonprofit Computers in Entertainment. It was published by the Association for Computing Machinery (ACM) for which Lee interviewed Roy E. Disney, Quincy Jones, and George Lucas. He oversaw the journal and magazine for 15 years from 2003 to 2018, which is the longest term held as editor-in-chief in the history of ACM.

== Bibliography ==
=== Encyclopedia ===
- Encyclopedia of Computer Graphics and Games (2023), ISBN 978-3031231599

=== Academic books ===
- Digital Twin: Fundamentals and Applications (2024), with Soheil Sabri and Kostas Alexandridis, ISBN 978-3031677779
- Nonprofit Digital Transformation Demystified: A Practical Guide (2023), with Ali A. Gooyabadi and Zahra GorjianKhanzad, ISBN 978-3031471810
- Disney Stories: Getting to Digital, 2nd Edition (2020), with Krystina Madej, ISBN 978-3-0304-2737-5
- The Transhumanism Handbook (2019), ISBN 978-3-030-16919-0
- Emotion in Video Game Soundtracking (2018), with Duncan Williams, ISBN 978-3-319-72271-9
- Game Dynamics: Best Practices in Procedural and Dynamic Game Content Generation (2017), with Oliver Korn, ISBN 978-3-319-53087-1
- Digital Da Vinci: Computers in the Arts and Sciences (2014), ISBN 978-1-4939-0964-3
- Digital Da Vinci: Computers in Music (2014), ISBN 978-1-4939-0535-5
- Disney Stories: Getting to Digital (2012), with Krystina Madej, ISBN 978-1-4614-2100-9

=== Total information awareness book series ===
- Counterterrorism and Cybersecurity: Total Information Awareness, 3rd Edition (2024), ISBN 978-3-031-63125-2
- Facebook Nation: Total Information Awareness, 3rd Edition (2021), ISBN 978-1-0716-1866-0
- Google It: Total Information Awareness (2016), ISBN 978-1-4939-6413-0
- Counterterrorism and Cybersecurity: Total Information Awareness, 2nd Edition (2015), ISBN 978-3-319-17243-9
- Facebook Nation: Total Information Awareness, 2nd Edition (2014), ISBN 978-1-4939-1739-6
- Counterterrorism and Cybersecurity: Total Information Awareness (2013), ISBN 978-1-4614-7204-9
- Facebook Nation: Total Information Awareness (2012), ISBN 978-1-4614-5307-9

== Movies, games, and music ==
Lee was credited as a software engineer for Disney's Animated Storybooks (1994 video game) (featured on Billboard) and Pocahontas (1996 video game).

Lee was also credited for web design and game development for the 2015 documentary film Finding Noah: The Search for Noah's Ark.

Lee has executive produced dance-pop songs that have charted on U.S. Billboard, U.K. Music Week, and U.S. iTunes HOT 100 (Electronic) as well as appeared on American Idol and Lifetime original movie Cheyenne. His song "Keep the Love Online" (aka "Keep This Love Online") peaked at #8 on the U.K. Music Week Commercial Pop Club Chart on December 5, 2025.

In 2016, he curated and released the Google It (Soundtrack) music album consisting of Roger Hodgson's The Logical Song, Princess X's Free, and six cover songs from the Beatles, the Eagles, R.E.M., Pink Floyd, and Zager and Evans.

== Politics ==
Lee is the chairman of the California Transhumanist Party. Previously, he was the Education and Media Advisor for the United States Transhumanist Party and a campaign advisor to Zoltan Istvan for the 2016 U.S. presidential election.

== Philanthropy ==
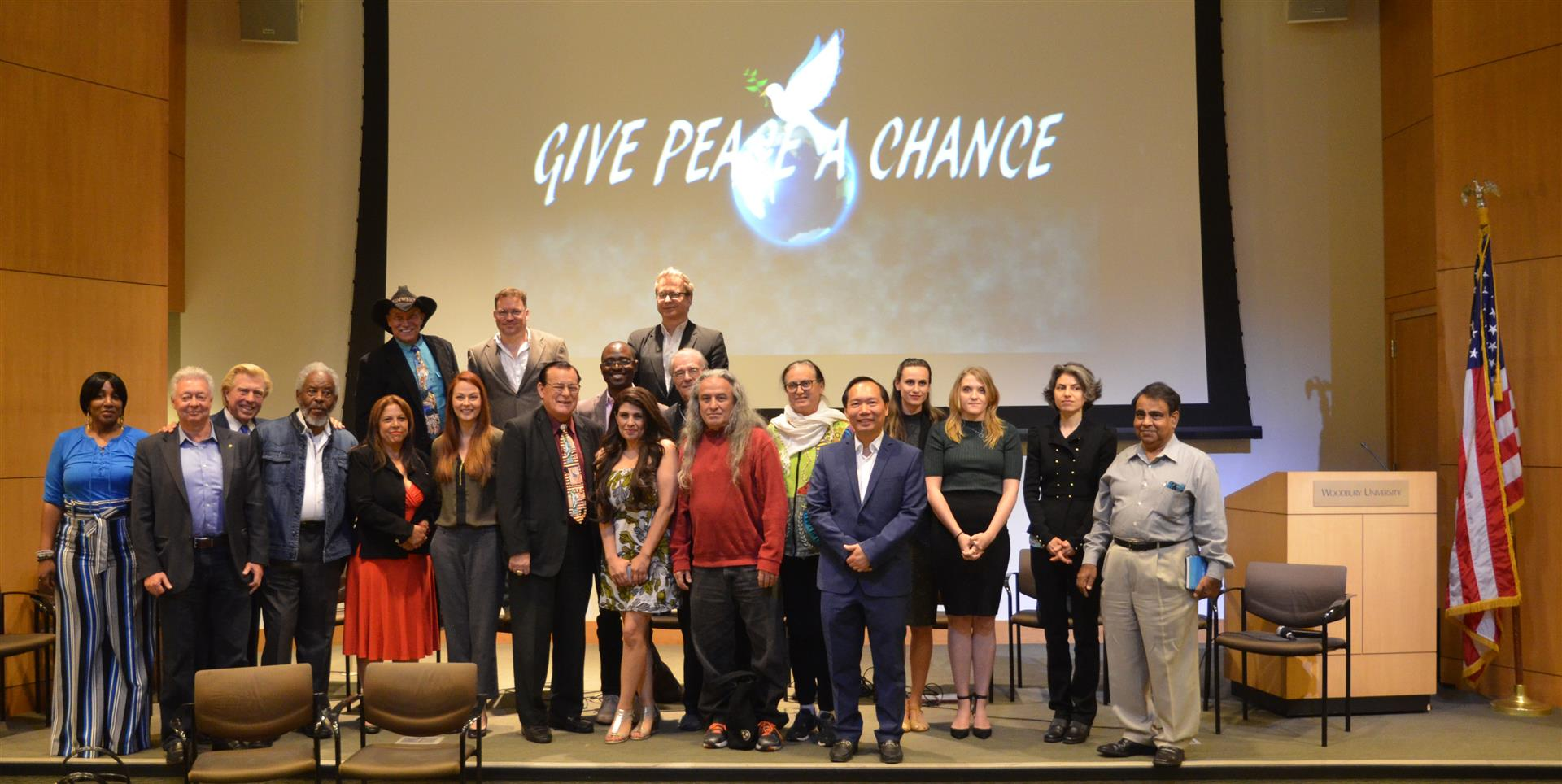
Attendees at the 2018 Earth Day Peace Conference and Movie Screening

Lee is the founding president of the 501(c)(3) nonprofit Institute for Education, Research, and Scholarships (IFERS) acknowledged by Alan Kay and Quincy Jones at the American Film Institute on November 4, 2006 during the Computers in Entertainment awards ceremony as well as by Senator Richard D. Roth of the California State Senate on March 14, 2016 in support of Type 1 diabetes awareness and research.

On Earth Day on April 22, 2018, Lee was an organizer of the IFERS-sponsored 2018 Earth Day Peace Conference and Movie Screening.

== Advisory boards ==
Lee has served on the advisory boards at Virginia Tech, University of Southern California, National University of Singapore, Murdoch University, Digital Hollywood, and the High School Music Company.
