= Jeanie Tracy =

American musician

- Tracy performing at Southern Decadence in New Orleans, 2007.

Background information
- Also known as: Jeanie Tracy-Smith, Silhouette, Technodiva
- Born: Houston, Texas, U.S.
- Genre: house · R&B · disco · soul · Hi-NRG · gospel
- Occupations: Singer-songwriter, record producer, actress
- Instruments: Vocals, piano
- Years active: 1970–present
- Labels: Mamahouse Records, Carrillo Music, AM Records, TommyBoy, Megatone
- Website: www.jeanietracy.com

Jeanie Tracy is an American singer-songwriter, actress, and record producer. She rose to fame in the late 1970s as a background singer of Sylvester, an American disco singer. Her first album, Me and You (1982), featured post-disco hits "I'm Your Jeanie","Sing Your Own Song" and the overlooked 1983 smash R&B and Funk hit,"Can I Come Over And Play With You Tonight". From late 1984 to early 1985, she performed on television Show Star Search where she was the winner in the Female Vocalist category for six weeks. In 1995, Tracy released her second album It's My Time.

In 2012, Tracy portrayed gospel singer Mahalia Jackson in the theater production Mahalia: A Gospel Singer. She released an extended play Making New Friends (2015), which features past singles.

Throughout her career, Tracy has scored four number-one dance singles: "The Power" (2001), "Cha Cha Heels" (2004), "Party People" (2006), and "Livin' for Your Love (Your Love)" (2016).

== Early life ==
Jeanie Autre Tracy was born in Houston, Texas and raised in Fresno, California. At a young age, Tracy began singing in her church choir at Pentecostal Church of God in Christ. During her high school years, she studied opera and classical piano. She played the lead in Oscar Brown Jr.'s stage play Slave Driver in 1970.

== Career ==
=== 1975–1981: Sylvester and background singing ===
In 1975, Tracy released her debut single "Making New Friends" on the Brown Door Records. In 1976, she contributed vocals to Richard "Dimples" Fields' album Ready For Anything. In 1979, Tracy relocated to San Francisco, California where she was introduced to Harvey Fuqua, the manager for American disco singer Sylvester. Soon after meeting Sylvester, Tracy became friends with him and began singing backgrounds for him in addition to his then-current background singers Two Tons o' Fun (Martha Wash and Izora Armstead). In March 1979, she debuted as his background vocalist on Sylvester's live album Living Proof which was performed at the War Memorial Opera House. In the same year, Tracy contributed her vocals to the soundtrack of Francis Ford Coppola's film, Apocalypse Now.

In 1980, Tracy sang background vocals on Two Tons o Fun first-two albums Two Tons of Fun and Backatcha. In 1981, Sylvester released his fifth and final album Too Hot to Step. The album featured two duet songs from Sylvester and Tracy called "Here Is My Love" and "Give It Up", both of which peaked at number 20 on Billboard's Disco chart. In the same year, she appeared as a featured vocalist on the song "You're Gonna Lose Me" for jazz musician Freddie Hubbard's album Splash.

=== 1982–1988: Me and You ===
In 1982, Tracy released her debut album Me and You on Fantasy Records. The album's lead single was "Your Old Standby", a cover of Mary Wells's 1963 hit. The second single "I'm Your Jeanie" would inspire Sylvester's song "Do You Wanna Funk". The third single was the album's titled-track "Me and You". In the same year, she released two singles "Can I Come Over And Play With You Tonight" and "Hot(For Your Love)". In 1984, she secured a record contract with Megatone Records and released two singles "Sing Your Own Song" and "Time Bomb", which peaked at number thirty-three on Billboard's Dance chart. From late 1984 to early 1985, she performed on television Show Star Search where she was the winner in the Female Vocalist category for six weeks. In 1985, she released her version of "Don't Leave Me This Way", which peaked at number twenty-two on the Dance chart. In the same year, Tracy became friends with Narada Michael Walden, whom she sang backgrounds vocals on his album The Nature of Things.

In 1987, Tracy took a brief hiatus from the mainstream spotlight to take care of friend Sylvester, who had now been diagnosed with AIDS. In 1988, she appeared alongside Sylvester in the Castro's 1988 Gay Freedom Parade. Following Sylvester's death, Tracy sang Sylvester's favorite song "Never Grow Old" during his funeral at Love Center Church in East Oakland. In the same year, Tracy released a single "Let's Dance".

=== 1989–1998: Transition to house music and It's My Time ===
In 1990, Tracy made a transition in house music and techno music. Between 1990 and 1991, she released two singles under the alias Technodiva called: "I Found Love" and "Picture This". She released two additional singles, "Funkin' With Yo Emotion" and "Party Up (Feel The Funky Beat)", before retiring her Technodiva moniker.

In 1994, Tracy signed to UK record label Pulse-8 Records. In August 1994, she released "If This Is Love" as the lead single from forthcoming album. She follow-up with the release of another single "Do You Believe In The Wonder" in November 1994. In March 1995, she released "It's My Time". In June 1995, Tracy released her second album It's My Time. The album's fourth single "It's A Man's Man's Man's World", a cover version of the James Brown hit, featured a collaboration with singer Bobby Womack. The single peaked at number seventy-three on the UK Singles chart. "Crying In My Sleep" was released as the album's final single in 1995. In 1997, she released a single called "Happiness". In 1998, no longer signed with Pulse-8, she re-united with the "It's My Time" album's team of producers, the Band of Gypsies, for a single entitled "Answer My Prayer". In the same year, Tracy began a regular cast member and voiced the character Bantu in the children series Adventures with Kanga Roddy.

=== 1999–2016: AM Records, Rosabel and Altar ===
In 1999, Tracy was approached by Frank Abraham & Jimmy Markee (owners of AM Records) with a recording contract and released a single "Can't Take My Eyes Off You", remixed by Rosabel and released on AM Records. The single peaked at number twenty on Billboards Dance chart. In March 2000, Tracy released another single Produced by Abraham & Markee and remixed by Rosabel called "Keep The Party Jumpin" on AM Records. The single charted at number five on Billboards Dance chart. In another collaboration with house music duo Rosabel, Tracy released a single "The Power" in 2001. The single peaked at number one on Billboards Dance chart, spending one week at number one. In June 2004, they released another single "Cha Cha Heels", which also peaked at number one on Billboard's Dance chart.

In March 2006, Tracy released a single titled "Party People", a collaboration with house music duo Altar on MamaHouse Records. The single became Tracy's third number-one song on Billboards Dance chart. In 2007, Tracy and American singer Vicki Shepard released a single "I Got a Feeling 2007", a re-recorded version of her earlier single. The single peaked at number fifteen on Billboards Dance chart. In the same year, she appeared in the BBC television documentary "The Queens of Disco". In February 2008, she released another collaborative single with Altar called "Everybody Up". The song peaked at number seven on Billboard's Dance chart. In November 2008, Tracy performed at Winds of Change event during Pride Festival in Palm Springs, California. In May 2009, she performed at the Let the Sunshine in benefit concert.

In 2010, she appeared on TV One's Unsung program about Sylvester. In February 2010, Tracy replaced Jennifer Holliday and portrayed gospel singer Mahalia Jackson in the theatre play Mahalia: A Gospel Singer. Tracy also appeared in the Unsung television documentary about her friend Angela Bofill in 2012. In the same year, she appeared in the BBC television documentary "The Joy of Disco".

On April 20, 2015, Tracy released an extended play Making New Friends. The extended play consisted of four past singles: "Can I Come Over And Play With You Tonight", "Hot (For Your Love)", "Making New Friends", and "Trippin' on the Sounds".

=== 2017–present: Recent projects ===
In May 2018, she released a single "Is This My Last Stop for Love".

== Legacy ==
In 2012, Tracy was inducted into the West Coast Blues Hall of Fame. In the same year, she was also inducted into the Just Circuit Award Hall of Fame Artist Award. Aretha Franklin and Patti LaBelle, both of whom have recorded with Tracy, have considered Tracy to be "One of the Top Ten Voices in the World". As of 2016, Tracy has collectively accumulated a total of four number-one dance singles.

== Personal life ==
She is married to her husband William Smith. As a devout Christian, she is a member of Acts Full Gospel Church of God in Christ in Oakland, California. She is also fluent in the French language.

== Discography ==
=== Albums ===
- Me and You (1982)
- It's My Time (1995)

=== Singles ===
As a main performer

Title	Year	Peak chart positions			Album
Title	Year	US Dance	US Electronic	UK	Album
"Making New Friends"	1975	—	—	—	Non-album single
"Your Old Standby"	1982	—	—	—	Me and You
"I'm Your Jeanie"	1982	—	—	—	Me and You
"Me and You"	1982	—	—	—	Me and You
"Can I Come Over And Play With You Tonight"	1983	15	—	—	Non-album single
"Hot (For Your Love)"	1983	45	—	—	Non-album single
"Sing Your Own Song"	1984	33	—	—	Me and You
"Time Bomb"	1984	33	—	—	Non-album single
"Manhunt" (Note: Credited to Silhouette, an alias used by Jeanie Tracy in 1984.)	1984	—	—	—	Non-album single
"Don't Leave Me This Way"	1985	22	—	—	Non-album single
"Let's Dance"	1988	—	—	—	Non-album single
"I Found Love" (Note: Credited to Technodiva, an alias used by Jeanie Tracy between 1990 and 1991.)	1990	—	—	—	Non-album single
"Picture This"	1990	—	—	—	Non-album single
"Funkin' With Yo Emotion"	1990	—	—	—	Non-album single
"Party Up (Feel The Funky Beat)"	1991	—	—	—	Non-album single
"It's My Time"	1993	—	—	80	It's My Time
"If This Is Love"	1994	—	—	83	It's My Time
"Do You Believe In The Wonder"	1994	—	—	57	It's My Time
"Do You Wanna Be"	1995	—	—	—	It's My Time
"It's A Man's Man's Man's World" (with Bobby Womack)	1995	—	—	73	It's My Time
"Crying In My Sleep"	1995	—	—	—	It's My Time
"Happiness"	1997	—	—	—	Non-album single
"Answer My Prayer"	1998	—	—	—	Non-album single
"Can't Take My Eyes Off You"	1999	20	—	—	Non-album single
"Keep The Party Jumpin"	2000	5	—	—	Non-album single
"The Power" (featuring Rosabel)	2001	1	—	—	Non-album single
"Cha Cha Heels" (featuring Rosabel)	2004	1	—	—	Non-album single
"Party People" (featuring Altar)	2006	1	—	—	Non-album single
"Everybody Up" (featuring Altar)	2008	7	—	—	Non-album single
"Turn It Up" (featuring Altar)	2009	7	—	—	Non-album single
"Feel Good" (featuring Edson Pride)	2010	—	—	—	Non-album single
"Getcha"	2012	—	—	—	Non-album single
"We Will Be Free Tonight" (with Altar)	2012	—	—	—	Non-album single
"Viva" (with Altar)	2014	—	—	—	Non-album single
"Stand Strong" (featuring Rosabel)	2014	5	33	—	Non-album single
"Andalé" (with Altar)	2015	20	—	—	Non-album single
"Livin' For Your Love (Your Love)" (featuring Rosabel)	2016	1	27	—	Non-album single
"Is This My Last Stop for Love"	2018	—	—	—	Non-album single
"Happiness 2020" (featuring Wand)	2020	—	—	—	Non-album single

As a featured performer

Title	Year	Peak chart positions		Album
Title	Year	US R&B	US Dance	Album
"Here Is My Love" (Sylvester featuring Jeanie Tracy)	1982	20	44	Too Hot to Sleep
"Give It Up (Don't Make Me Wait)" (Sylvester featuring Jeanie Tracy)	1982	20	—	Too Hot to Sleep
"Call It Love" (Billy "Jack" Williams featuring Jeanie Tracy)	1996	—	—	Non-album single
"Into Tomorrow" (Full House featuring Jeanie Tracy)	1997	—	—	Non-album single
"Put Some Funk In Your Shoes" (In Between featuring Jeanie Tracy and Larry Batiste)	2007	—	20	Non-album single
"I Got a Feeling" (Vicki Shepard featuring Jeanie Tracy)	2007	—	15	Non-album single
"Fabulous" (Dirty Disco featuring Jeanie Tracy)	2016	—	13	Non-album single
"Absolute Danger" (Dirty Disco featuring Jeanie Tracy)	2017	—	—	Non-album single
"Santa Baby" (Dirty Disco featuring Jeanie Tracy)	2019	—	—	Non-album single

== See also ==
- List of number-one dance hits (United States)
- List of artists who reached number one on the US Dance chart
