= Baginski =

Baginski or Bagiński (Polish pronunciation: [baˈɡiɲski]; feminine: Bagińska; plural: Bagińscy) is a Polish surname. It is a toponymic surname derived from any of the places named Bagno, Bagienice, Bagieńsko, Bagienko.

It appears in multiple languages in various forms. Belarusian and Ukrainian surnames are generally transliterated with an 'h' but may also use a 'g'.

== Related surnames ==
Language	Masculine	Feminine
Polish	Bagiński	Bagińska
Belarusian (Romanization)	Багінскі (Bahinski, Baginski)	Багінская (Bahinskaja, Bahinskaya, Baginskaja, Baginskaya)
Lithuanian	Baginskas	Baginskienė (married); Baginskaitė (unmarried)
Romanian/Moldovan	Baghinschi	
Russian (Romanization)	Багинский (Baginskiy, Baginskii, Baginsky, Baginskij)	Багинская (Baginskaya, Baginskaia, Baginskaja)
Ukrainian (Romanization)	Багінський (Bahinskyi, Bahinskyy, Bahinsky, Bahinskyj, Baginskyi, Baginskyy, Baginsky, Baginskyj)	Багінська (Bahinska, Baginska)
Hungarian	Bagyinszki, Bagyinszky	

== People ==
=== Baginski ===
- Jan Bagiński (1932–2019), Polish Roman Catholic bishop
- Jacquelyn Baginski (born 1985/1986), American politician
- Jonathan Baginski, Australian filmmaker and futurist
- Leo Maximilian Baginski (1881–1964), German entrepreneur and inventor
- Maureen Baginski, American government official
- Max Baginski (1864–1943), German-American anarchist
- Mieczysław Bagiński (born 1944), Polish politician
- Tomasz Bagiński (born 1976), Polish artist

=== Baginsky ===
- Adolf Aron Baginsky (1843–1918), German pediatrician
- Benno Baginsky (1848–1919), German otorhinolaryngologist
