= Katzenstein =

Katzenstein may refer to:

== People ==
- Caroline Katzenstein, suffragist
- Henry Katzenstein, American physicist and entrepreneur
- Jacob Katzenstein, German otorhinolaryngologist
- Julius Katzenstein or Joseph Kastein, German writer
- Leopold Katzenstein, German naval architect and marine engineer
- Peter J. Katzenstein, international relations scholar
- Walther Katzenstein, German rower

== Places ==
Germany

- Katzenstein (Affalter), a mountain in Saxony, Germany
- Katzenstein (Habichtswald), a mountain in Hesse, Germany
- Katzenstein (Pobershau), a mountain in Saxony, Germany
- Katzenstein Castle, a castle in Baden-Württemberg, Germany

Slovenia

- Katzenstein mansion or Kacenštajn Castle

== Other uses ==
- Raab-Katzenstein, German aircraft manufacturer
- Raab-Katzenstein RK-26, German aircraft type
- The Rabbi Martin Katzenstein Award
