= Katzen =

Katzen is a surname of German origin, which means "cats". It may refer to:

- Daniel Katzen (born 1952), French horn player and teacher
- Jay K. Katzen (1936–2020), American diplomat
- Lila Katzen (1925–1998), American sculptor
- Mollie Katzen (born 1950), American chef and writer
- Sally Katzen (born 1942), American legal scholar
- Katzen (performer)

== Related names ==
- Katz (surname)
- Katzenbach (disambiguation)
- Katzenellenbogen
- Katzenelson
- Katzenstein (disambiguation)
- Katzman
- Katzmann

== See also ==
- Katzen Arts Center, American University, Washington DC
- Katzen Cancer Research Center, Washington DC
- Katzensee, a lake in Zurich, Switzerland
