= Katzenworld =

British blog

- Website type: Cat Blog
- Founders: Marc-André Runcie-Unger; Yuki Chung; Laura Haile
- Website: katzenworld.co.uk
- Launched: March 2014; 12 years ago

Katzenworld is the UK's biggest blog platform on the subject of the cat. Katzenworld was founded by German-born Marc-André Runcie-Unger, Yuki Chung and Laura Haile. The name came from the German word Katzen meaning cats so it translates in English as Cats World. It was launched March 2014. It receives an average rate of 210.000 visits per month in 2019, Cision Media Intelligence.

== Brand design ==
The brand's logo represents a Tuxedo Cat as its main focus. Promotional materials for the website and merchandise were then categorised into different colours.

== Editors ==
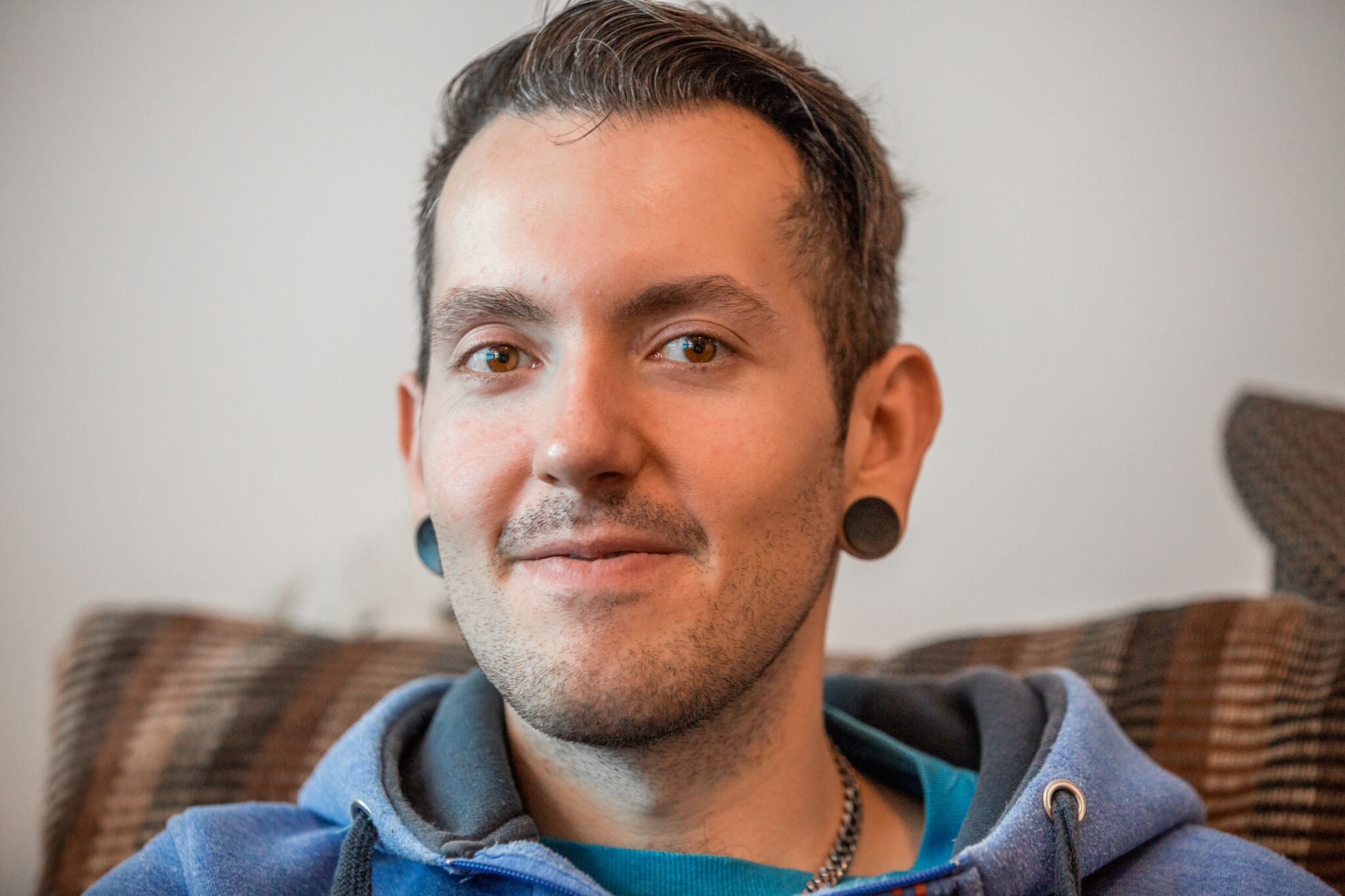
Founder of Katzenworld: Marc-Andre Runcie-Unger

Lead writer Marc has won awards from the cat writer association, receiving a certificate of excellence for being included in the Top 3 Cat Health Articles of 2016. Ranked as part of the Top 15 Cat Influencers on the Web compiled by Allaboutcats.

== Contributors ==
Katzenworld has regular article contributions from animal welfare experts such as Royal Society for the Prevention of Cruelty to Animals | Rspca, UK cat behaviourist and author Anita Kelsey, UK charity Cats Protection and feline welfare charity International Cat Care.

== Products and collaborations ==
Katzenworld's news stories and the publication's online shop products generally target cat lovers & owners. First introduced through online competitions, Katzenworld launched its first collection of keyrings and personalised cat designs of the winners.

Following the exclusive appearance of 4cats toys in the Katzenworld online store, the products were then sold at pet shows such as the UK National Pet Show nationwide. Which helped the official UK launch of 4cats products in the UK and 4cats X Katzenworld collaborations.

== Awards and nominations ==
Year	Award	Category	Placed	Result
2020	MyPostcard	The Best Pet Blogs to Keep you Feeling Paws-itive		Won
2020	M&A Today Global Awards	Best Online Cat Information Platform 2020		Won
2019	Vuelio	Top UK Pet Blogs 2019	1st	Won
2019	Dr. Fox Magazine	Top 10 Pet Blogs 2019	-	Won
2019	Global 100	Best Online Cat Information Platform 2019	-	Won
2019	Pup Junkies	Top 25 Pet Blogs	-	Won
2019	Cyberpet	Top 30 Pet Blogs Pet Parents Can Find On The Internet	-	Won
2019	Lux Magazine	Online Cat Information Resource of the Year 2019	-	Won
2019	Feedspot	Top 10 UK Cat Blogs and Websites To Follow in 2019	2nd	Won
2019	Catmania	Top 25 Cat Blogs All Cat Lovers Should Know	-	Won
2019	Feedspot	Top 100 Worldwide Cat Blogs 2019	6th	Won
2019	Webbox	Top Pet Blogs to Follow in 2019		Won
2019	Ranked Blogs	Top Cat Blogs	3rd	Won
2018	Vuelio	Top UK Pet Blogs 2018	1st	Won
2018	Review Institute	Top 50 Pet & Animal Blog	-	Won
2018	Dr. Fox Magazine	Top 10 Pet Blogs 2018	-	Won
2018	Feedspot	Top 10 UK Cat Blogs and Websites to Follow in 2018	2nd	Won
2018	Stop the Fleas	Top 25 Pet Blogs 2018	-	Won
2018	Feedspot	Top 10 UK Cat Blogs 2018	2nd	Won
2018	All About Cats	Top 35 Worldwide Cat Blogs	-	Won
2018	Lux Magazine	Best Online Cat Information Platform 2018	-	Won
2017	Vuelio	Top UK Pet Blogs 2017	1st	Won
2017	Feedspot	Top 100 Worldwide Cat Blog	8th	Won
2017	Thoroughly Reviewed	Top 50 Worldwide Cat Blogs	-	Won
2017	All About Cats	Top 35 Worldwide Cat Blogs	-	Won
2017	Tuxedo Cat Blog	Top 30 Worldwide Cat Blogs	-	Won
