= Dark City (1998 film) =

1998 film by Alex Proyas

- Theatrical release poster
- Directed by: Alex Proyas
- Screenplay by: Alex Proyas; Lem Dobbs; David S. Goyer
- Story by: Alex Proyas
- Produced by: Andrew Mason; Alex Proyas
- Starring: Rufus Sewell; Kiefer Sutherland; Jennifer Connelly; Richard O'Brien; Ian Richardson; William Hurt
- Cinematography: Dariusz Wolski
- Edited by: Dov Hoenig
- Music by: Trevor Jones
- Production company: Mystery Clock Cinema
- Distributed by: New Line Cinema (United States); Roadshow Films (Australia)
- Release dates: 27 February 1998 (United States); 6 August 1998 (Australia)
- Running time: 100 minutes
- Countries: United States; Australia
- Language: English
- Budget: $27 million
- Box office: $27.2 million

Dark City is a 1998 neo-noir science fiction film directed, co-written, and co-produced by Alex Proyas. It stars Rufus Sewell, William Hurt, Kiefer Sutherland, Jennifer Connelly, Richard O'Brien, and Ian Richardson. The screenplay was written by Proyas, Lem Dobbs, and David S. Goyer. In the film, Sewell plays an amnesiac man who, finding himself suspected of murder, attempts to discover his true identity and clear his name while on the run from the police and a mysterious group known as the "Strangers".

Primarily shot at Fox Studios Australia, the film was jointly produced by New Line Cinema and Proyas's production company Mystery Clock Cinema, and distributed by the former for theatrical release. It premiered in the United States on 27 February 1998 and received generally positive reviews. Roger Ebert, in particular, supported the film, appreciating its art direction, set design, cinematography, special effects, and imagination, and even recorded an audio commentary for the film's home video release.

The film was nominated for the Hugo Award for Best Dramatic Presentation and six Saturn Awards. Some critics later noted Dark City's similarities to and influence on the Matrix film series, whose first installment came out a year later, and the film is now widely considered a sci-fi cult classic.

Concerned that audiences would not understand the film, New Line asked Proyas to add an explanatory voice-over to the introduction, and he complied. When a director's cut of the film was released in 2008, among the changes was the removal of the opening narration.

== Plot ==
John Murdoch awakens in a hotel bathtub with amnesia. He receives a phone call from Dr. Daniel Schreber, who urges him to flee the hotel to evade a group of men who are after him. In the room, Murdoch discovers the corpse of a ritualistically murdered woman and a bloody knife. He flees the scene, just as a group of pale men in trenchcoats ("the Strangers") arrive.

Police Inspector Frank Bumstead, who is investigating murdered prostitutes, identifies Murdoch as a suspect. Following clues, Murdoch learns his name and finds out he has a wife named Emma. When the Strangers corner him, Murdoch instinctively alters reality (an ability the Strangers share and refer to as tuning) to create an escape path for himself.

Murdoch wanders the streets of the city where it is perpetually nighttime but no one seems to notice. When the clock strikes twelve, Murdoch witnesses everyone else fall asleep and the Strangers use tuning to physically rearrange the city's architecture. Afterwards, assisted by Schreber, the Strangers inject selected people with new memories. Murdoch learns that he came from a coastal town called Shell Beach, which everyone knows, though no one remembers how to get there and Murdoch's attempts to visit fail. The Strangers inject a copy of Murdoch's intended memories into one of their own, Mr. Hand, hoping it will help them predict Murdoch's movements and track him down.

Inspector Bumstead catches Murdoch, though he acknowledges that Murdoch is most likely innocent, as he has misgivings about the city's nature. They confront Schreber, who explains the Strangers' nature. They are extra-terrestrials residing in human corpses who share a hive mind, and are experimenting with humans (whom they have abducted) to analyze individuality in hopes of making a discovery that will help their race to survive. Murdoch, as Schreber reveals, is an anomaly who inadvertently awoke before Schreber could implant his latest identity as a murderer.

Murdoch and Bumstead take Schreber and attempt to reach Shell Beach but instead end up at a poster for the town on a wall at the edge of the city. Frustrated, Murdoch and Bumstead break through the wall, revealing outer space, just before some of the Strangers, including Mr. Hand, arrive with Emma as a hostage. In the ensuing fight, Bumstead and one of the Strangers fall through the hole and drift out into space, and the city is shown to be a deep space habitat surrounded by a force field.

The Strangers bring Murdoch to their home beneath the city and force Schreber to imprint Murdoch with their collective memory, believing Murdoch to be the culmination of their experiments. Schreber instead injects Murdoch with memories of decades of training about the Strangers, their machines, and tuning. Murdoch awakens with his powers fully realized. He frees himself and battles the Strangers, eventually defeating their leader Mr. Book in a psychokinetic fight high above the city.

After learning from Schreber that Emma has been re-imprinted and cannot be restored, Murdoch employs his powers, amplified by the Strangers' machines, to create a real Shell Beach within the habitat. On his way home, Murdoch encounters a dying Mr. Hand and informs him that the Strangers searched in the wrong place—the mind—to understand humanity. He rotates the habitat toward the star it had been turned away from and the city experiences sunlight for the first time.

Opening a door leading out of the city, Murdoch steps out to view the sunrise. On the pier in front of him is the woman he knew as Emma, who now has new memories and a new identity as Anna. Murdoch reintroduces himself and they walk to Shell Beach, beginning their relationship anew.

== Cast ==
- Rufus Sewell as John Murdoch
- William Hurt as Inspector Frank Bumstead
- Kiefer Sutherland as Dr. Daniel P. Schreber
- Jennifer Connelly as Emma Murdoch / Anna
- Richard O'Brien as Mr. Hand
- Ian Richardson as Mr. Book
- Bruce Spence as Mr. Wall
- Colin Friels as Detective Eddie Walenski
- John Bluthal as Karl Harris
- Mitchell Butel as Officer Husselbeck
- Melissa George as May
- Frank Gallacher as Chief Inspector Stromboli
- Ritchie Singer as hotel manager / vendor
- Justin Monjo as taxi driver
- Nicholas Bell as Mr. Rain
- Satya Gumbert as Mr. Sleep
  - Noah Gumbert as Mr. Sleep filming double
- Frederick Miragliotta as Mr. Quick
- Jeanette Cronin as a Stranger
- David Wenham as Schreber's assistant
- Alan Cinis as automat cop
- Bill Highfield as automat cop
- Terry Bader as Mr. Jeremy Goodwin
- Rosemary Traynor as Mrs. Sylvia Goodwin
- Maureen O'Shaughnessy as Kate Walenski
- Darren Gilshenan as fingerprint cop

Anita Kelsey provided the singing voice of Emma Murdoch in the theatrical cut.

== Production ==
=== Influences ===
For Dark City, Proyas was influenced by film noir of the 1940s and the 1950s, such as The Maltese Falcon (1941), but also elements from the 60s and 70s were included in the movie. The film has been described as Kafkaesque, and Proyas cited the TV series The Twilight Zone as an influence. Proyas wanted the film, though nominally science fiction, to have an element of horror to unsettle the audience.

=== Writing ===
Proyas conceived a story about a 1940s detective who is obsessed with facts and cannot solve a case where the facts do not make sense, saying, "He slowly starts to go insane through the story. He can't put the facts together because they don't add up to anything rational". In the process of creating the fictional world for the character of the detective, Proyas created other characters and shifted the focus of the film from the detective (Bumstead) to the person pursued by the detective (Murdoch). Proyas envisioned a robust narrative where the audience could examine the film from the perspective of several characters and focus on the plot.

After writing the first draft of the screenplay by himself, Proyas worked with Lem Dobbs and David S. Goyer to create the final script. Goyer had written The Crow: City of Angels (1996), the sequel to Proyas's 1994 film The Crow, and Proyas invited Goyer to co-write Dark City after reading Goyer's screenplay for Blade, which had yet to be released. The Writers Guild of America initially protested against the crediting of more than two screenwriters for a film but relented and credited all three writers.

=== Design ===
When Proyas finished his preceding film, The Crow, in 1994, he approached production designer Patrick Tatopoulos to draw concepts for the world in which Dark City takes place. The city was built on a set, and no practical locations were used in the film. Describing the city, Tatopoulos said,

The movie takes place everywhere, and it takes place nowhere. It's a city built of pieces of cities. A corner from one place, another from some place else. So, you don't really know where you are. A piece will look like a street in London, but a portion of the architecture looks like New York, but the bottom of the architecture looks again like a European city. You're there, but you don't know where you are. It's like every time you travel, you'll be lost.

The production design included themes of darkness, spirals and clocks. There appears to be no sun in the city's world and spiral designs that shrink when approached were used. The Strangers' large clock does not have any numbers and Tatopoulos said "But in a magical moment it becomes something more than just a clock". The production designer created the city architecture to have an organic presence alongside the structural elements.

The Strangers' lair is a large underground amphitheater, in which a sculpture of a human face hides a large clock and a spiralling device changes the layout of the city above. The set for the lair was fifty ft (15 m) in height, while an average set is thirty-six ft (11 m), and was built on a fairground in Sydney, Australia. The film's budget was approximately $27 million, so the crew used inexpensive techniques to build the set, such as stretching canvas onto welded metal frames. The lair also had a rail conveyance that appeared expensive. Tatopoulos said "We had, obviously, a car built, but we had just one built. We laid some rail for it to ride on. We made a section of corridor that we kept driving through all the time and you end up believing this thing is running along forever". Proyas wanted the rail car to pass various rooms, which was not feasible given the budget, so Tatopoulos and the crew used "replaceable elements and strong design textures" to give the impression it was passing different rooms.

The railway station used in Sydney, was Museum Station. The old Sydney train was provided by SETS - Sydney Electric Train Society.

The Strangers are energy beings who reside in dead human bodies. At the beginning of the design process, the filmmakers considered having the Strangers resemble insects, but they decided the bug appearance was overused. Tatopoulos said one day Proyas "called me and said he wanted something like an energy that kept re-powering itself, re-creating itself, re-shaping itself, sitting inside a dry piece of human shape".

=== Casting ===
About the character of Mr Hand, Proyas said: "I had Richard in mind physically when I wrote the character, because I had these strange, bald-looking men with an ethereal, androgynous quality", and O'Brien had famously played a similar character (Riff Raff) in The Rocky Horror Show. When Proyas visited London to cast the film, he met with O'Brien and found him suitable for the role.

Daniel P. Schreber, the character portrayed by Kiefer Sutherland, was named after Daniel Paul Schreber, a German judge with narcissistic, paranoid psychosis, and possibly schizophrenia, whose autobiographical Memoirs of My Nervous Illness (Denkwürdigkeiten eines Nervenkranken) (1903) inspired some elements of the film's plot. William Hurt was originally asked to play Dr Schreber before eventually being cast as Inspector Bumstead. Proyas said that Ben Kingsley was one of the original choices to portray Dr Schreber. When Sutherland received the script he didn't understand why it was sent to him, thinking it was a mistake and that they wanted his father Donald.

=== Soundtrack ===
The film's soundtrack was released on 24 February 1998 by TVT Records. It features music from the original score by Trevor Jones, and versions of the songs "Sway" and "The Night Has a Thousand Eyes" performed by singer Anita Kelsey. It also includes music by Hughes Hall from the trailer a song by Echo & the Bunnymen that played over the final credits, as well as songs by Gary Numan and Course of Empire that did not appear in the film. The music for the film was edited by Simon Leadley and Jim Harrison.

== Release ==
New Line Cinema wanted the filmmakers to consider retitling the film Dark World or Dark Empire to help differentiate it from the recently released Mad City, but Dark City was kept as the title. The film was originally scheduled to be released in theaters on 17 October 1997, then 9 January 1998, and finally 27 February 1998, when it debuted in 1,754 theaters in the United States. The film was released in Australia on 6 August 1998 by Roadshow Films.

=== Home media ===
A Region 1 widescreen DVD of the film was released in the United States on 29 July 1998. Special features on the DVD included two audio commentary tracks (one with film critic Roger Ebert, and one with director Alex Proyas, writers Lem Dobbs and David S. Goyer, and production designer Patrick Tatopoulos), cast and crew biographies and filmographies, comparisons to Fritz Lang's Metropolis, set design drawings, and the theatrical trailer. The film was released on laserdisc in the United States on 12 August 1998. Special features were an audio commentary track by writer/director Alex Proyas, screenwriters Lem Dobbs & David Goyer, production designer Patrick Tatopoulos and director of photography Dariusz Wolski on the left analogue track and a Theatrical Trailer on chapter 19. The right analogue track contained a Dolby Digital / AC3 5.1 soundtrack. The film was also released on VHS on March 2, 1999.

=== Director's cut ===
A director's cut of Dark City was officially released on DVD and Blu-ray disc on 29 July 2008. The director's cut removes the opening narration, which Proyas felt explained too much of the plot, and includes approximately eleven minutes of additional footage, most of which extend scenes already present in the theatrical release with additional establishing shots and dialogue. The DVD and Blu-ray feature expanded audio commentaries by Ebert, Proyas, and Dobbs and Goyer, along with several new documentaries. The Blu-ray also includes the original theatrical cut of the film and the special features from the 1998 DVD release.

== Reception ==
=== Box office ===
On its opening weekend in theaters, Dark City grossed $5,576,953, enough to place fourth at the box office; Titanic, which had been released ten weeks earlier, grossed $19,633,056 and was still number one. The following weekend, it earned $2,837,941 (a decrease of 49.1%) and dropped to ninth place, while Titanic remained in first with grosses totaling $17,605,849.

During its four-week theatrical run, the film earned $14,378,331 domestically. Internationally, it took in an additional $12,821,985, for a combined worldwide box office total of $27,200,316. The film's cumulative gross was the 105th-highest of 1998.

=== Critical response ===
Among mainstream critics in the U.S., the film received generally positive reviews. On the review aggregator website Rotten Tomatoes, 78% of 91 critics' reviews are positive, with an average rating of 7.2/10. The website's consensus reads: "Stylishly gloomy, Dark City offers a polarizing whirl of arresting visuals and noirish action." Metacritic, which uses a weighted average, assigned the film a score of 66 out of 100, based on 23 critics, indicating "generally favorable" reviews. Audiences polled by CinemaScore gave the film an average grade of “B-“ on an A+ to F scale.

No movie can ever have too much atmosphere, and Dark City exudes it from every frame of celluloid. Proyas' world isn't just a playground for his characters to romp in—it's an ominous place where viewers can get lost. We don't just coolly observe the bizarre, ever-changing skyline; we plunge into the city's benighted depths, following the protagonist as he explores the secrets of this grim place where the sun never shines. Dark City has as stunning a visual texture as that of any movie that I've seen.

— James Berardinelli, writing for ReelViews

Writing in the Chicago Sun-Times, Roger Ebert called the film a "great visionary achievement", while also exclaiming that it was "a film so original and exciting, it stirred my imagination like Metropolis and 2001: A Space Odyssey." In the San Francisco Chronicle, Peter Stack wrote that the film was "among the most memorable cinematic ventures in recent years", and "maybe there's nothing wrong with a movie that is simply sensational to look at." He felt the film's "twisting of reality and its daring look—layered and off-kilter grays, greens and blacks—make it click." In a mixed review, Walter Addiego of The San Francisco Examiner thought that "as a story, Dark City doesn't amount to much", its "complicated plot" containing important themes that were "no more than window dressing", but that "what counts here is the show, the creation of a strange world by a filmmaker who clearly knows science fiction and fantasy, past and present, and wants to share his love for it."

Unimpressed by the film, Marc Savlov of The Austin Chronicle wrote: "You really have to feel for Alex Proyas. This guy wears bad luck like the grimy trenchcoats of his protagonists, only his zipper's stuck and he can't seem to shake the damn thing off." He felt "Dark City looks like a million bucks (or rather, a million bucks gone to compost), but at its dark heart it's a tedious, bewildering affair, lovely to look at but with all the substance of a dissipating dream." Left equally disappointed was John Anderson of the Los Angeles Times, who said of the directing that "If you had to guess, you might say that Proyas came out of the world of comic art himself, rather than music videos and advertising. Dark City is constructed like panels in a Batman book, each picture striving for maximum dread", and that Proyas was "trying simultaneously to create a pure thriller and sci-fi nightmare along with his tongue-in-cheek critique of artifice. And this doesn't work out quite so well." Author TCh of Time Out felt that the development of the Murdoch character was "surprisingly engrossing" and thought the "art direction is always striking, and unlike most contemporary sci-fi, the movie does risk a cerebral approach, tapping a vein of postmodern paranoia."

Richard Corliss of Time said the film was "as cool and distant as the planet the Strangers come from. But, Lord, is Dark City a wonder to see." James Berardinelli writing for ReelViews, remarked that "Visually, this film isn't just impressive, it's a tour de force." and noted that "Dark City opens by immersing the audience in the midst of a fractured, nightmarish narrative." Berardinelli also said "Dark City appears to be New York during the first half of this century, but, using a style that is part science fiction, part noir thriller, and part gothic horror, [Proyas] has embellished it to create a surreal place unlike no other." Describing some pitfalls, Jeff Vice of the Deseret News said that "when critics talk about films being 'style over substance', they're definitely talking about movies like Dark City, which looks good but leaves an unpleasant aftertaste." He was quick to admit that "The special effects and set designs are dazzling", but ultimately felt "Proyas makes a crucial error in treating the subject even more seriously than The Crow, and the dialogue (co-written by Proyas and The Crow: City of Angels scriptwriter David S. Goyer) is unintentionally funny at times and often just plain dumb."

What they have done is taken a few second-hand ideas from noir and speculative fiction and mixed them in occasionally striking ways, even if, in the end, the result isn't all that much fun.

— Todd McCarthy, writing in Variety

Andrea Basora of Newsweek, stated that director Proyas flooded the screen with "cinematic and literary references ranging from Murnau and Lang to Kafka and Orwell, creating a unique yet utterly convincing world". Similarly, David Sterritt wrote in The Christian Science Monitor that "The story is dark and often violent, but it's told with a remarkable sense of visual energy and imagination." Marshall Fine of USA Today found the film to be "Fascinating, visionary filmmaking", and said that "With its amber-tinged palette and its distinctively dystopian view of life, it may be the most unique-looking film we've seen in ages", but said that it "defies logic and makes frightening and unexpected leaps." Stephen Holden of The New York Times wrote that the "plot that Dark City builds on John's predicament is a confused affair" and that the film's premise is "unsettling enough to make you wonder if it could actually derail a seriously drug-addled mind."

Steve Biodrowski of Cinefantastique found the production design and the cinematography overwhelming, but he considered the narrative engagement of Sewell's amnesiac character to be ultimately successful, writing: "As the story progresses, the pieces of the puzzle fall into place, and we gradually realize that the film is not a murky muddle of visuals propping up a weak story. All the questions lead to answers, and the answers make sense within the fantasy framework." He compared Dark City to Proyas's preceding film, The Crow, in style, but found Dark City to introduce new themes and to be a "more thoroughly consistent" film. Biodrowski concluded that "Dark City may not provide profound answers, but it deals seriously with a profound idea, and does it in a way that is cathartic and even uplifting, without being contrived or condescending. As a technical achievement, it is superb, and that technique is put in the service of telling a story that would be difficult to realize any other way."

=== Accolades ===
The film won and was nominated for several awards in 1998. Film critic Roger Ebert cited it as the best film of 1998, and in 2005 he included it on his "Great Movies" list. Ebert used it in his teaching, and also recorded an audio commentary for the original DVD and the 2006 Director's Cut. The film was screened out of competition at the 1998 Cannes Film Festival.

Award	Category	Recipient(s)	Result
Amsterdam Fantastic Film Festival	Silver Scream Award	Alex Proyas	Won
Bram Stoker Awards	Best Screenplay	Alex Proyas, Lem Dobbs, and David S. Goyer	Won (Note: Tied with Gods and Monsters)
Brussels International Festival of Fantasy Film	Pegasus Audience Award	Alex Proyas	Won
Film Critics Circle of Australia	Best Screenplay – Original	Alex Proyas, Lem Dobbs, and David S. Goyer	Won (Note: Tied with The Interview)
Hugo Awards	Best Dramatic Presentation	Dark City	Nominated
International Horror Guild Awards	Best Movie	Dark City	Nominated
National Board of Review	Special Recognition	Dark City	Won
Saturn Awards	Best Science Fiction Film	Dark City	Won (Note: Tied with Armageddon)
Saturn Awards	Best Costume	Liz Keogh	Nominated
Saturn Awards	Best Director	Alex Proyas	Nominated
Saturn Awards	Best Make-Up	Bob McCarron, Lesley Vanderwalt, and Lynn Wheeler	Nominated
Saturn Awards	Best Special Effects	Andrew Mason, Mara Bryan, Peter Doyle, and Tom Davies	Nominated
Saturn Awards	Best Writer	Alex Proyas, Lem Dobbs, and David S. Goyer	Nominated

== Analysis ==
One of the things that we're exploring in this film, is what it is that makes us who we are. And, when you strip an individual of his identity, is there some spark, some essence there that keeps them being human, gives them some sort of identity?

— Alex Proyas

The theologian Gerard Loughlin interpreted Dark City as a retelling of Plato's Allegory of the Cave. For Loughlin, the city dwellers are prisoners who do not realize they are in a prison. John Murdoch's escape from the prison parallels the escape from the cave in the allegory. He is assisted by Dr. Schreber, who explains the city's mechanism as Socrates explains to Glaucon how the shadows in the cave are cast. Murdoch becomes more than Glaucon, "He is a Glaucon who comes to realize that Socrates' tale of an upper, more real world, is itself a shadow, a forgery". Murdoch defeats the Strangers, who control the inhabitants, and remakes the world based on childhood memories, illusions arranged by the Strangers. He casts new shadows for the city inhabitants, who must trust his judgment. Unlike Plato, Murdoch "is disabused of any hope of an outside" and becomes the demiurge for the cave, the only environment he knows. Of the lack of background provided in the film, Loughlin said "The origin of the city is off-stage, unknown and unknowable".

The city in Dark City was described by Sarah L. Higley as a "murky, nightmarish German expressionist film noir depiction of urban repression and mechanism". It has a World War II-era dreariness reminiscent of Edward Hopper's works, as well as details from different eras and architectures, from the 1940s to the 1960s, that are changed by the Strangers "buildings collapse as others emerge and battle with one another at the end". The round window of Murdoch's hotel room is concave, like a fishbowl and is a frequently seen element throughout the city. The inhabitants do not live at the top of the city; the main characters' homes are dwarfed by the bricolage of buildings.

The film contains motifs from Greek mythology, in which gods manipulate humans to serve a higher agenda. Proyas said "I do like Greek mythology and have read a little of it, so maybe some of it has crept into the work, though I don't completely agree with that point of view".

== Similarities to other works ==
The film's style is often compared to that of the works of Terry Gilliam (especially Brazil). Some stylistic similarities have also been noted to Jean-Pierre Jeunet and Marc Caro's 1995 film The City of Lost Children, another film that was particularly inspired by Gilliam (Gilliam had presented Jeunet's and Caro's previous film Delicatessen (1991), which was a deliberate homage to Gilliam's style, in North America).

The Matrix, which was released one year after Dark City, was also filmed at Fox Studios in Sydney, and it even used some of Dark City's sets. Comparisons of the two films have made note of similarities in cinematography, atmosphere, and plot.

Fritz Lang's 1927 film Metropolis was a major influence on the architecture, concepts about the baseness of humans within a metropolis, and the general tone of Dark City. In one of the documentary shorts included on the director's cut home video releases of the film, the influence of the early German films M and Nosferatu are also mentioned.

One of the last scenes of the movie, in which buildings "restore" themselves, is similar to the last panel of the Akira manga, and Proyas has called the film's final battle an "homage to Otomo's Akira". Dark City has also drawn comparisons to the anime films Urusei Yatsura 2: Beautiful Dreamer (1984) and Megazone 23 (1985), as well as the 1993 video game Gadget Invention, Travel, & Adventure.

When Christopher Nolan first started thinking about writing the script for Inception, he was influenced by "that era of movies where you had The Matrix, you had Dark City, you had The Thirteenth Floor and, to a certain extent, you had Memento, too. They were based in the principles that the world around you might not be real".

== Related works ==
Mask of the Evil Apparition, a short film written and directed by Proyas, set in the Dark City world, was released in 2021. The film was distributed only through Proyas' streaming platform VidiVerse. During a Q&A session after a screening of the short film, Proyas revealed he was in the early stages of developing a Dark City series.

== See also ==
- List of films featuring space stations
