= Interpretations of 2001: A Space Odyssey =

Academic analyses of 2001: A Space Odyssey

Since its premiere in 1968, the film 2001: A Space Odyssey has been analysed and interpreted by numerous people, ranging from professional film critics to amateur writers and science fiction fans. The director of the film, Stanley Kubrick, and the writer, Arthur C. Clarke, wanted to leave the film open to philosophical and allegorical interpretation, purposely presenting the final sequences of the film without the underlying thread being apparent; a concept illustrated by the final shot of the film, which contains the image of the embryonic "Starchild". Nonetheless, in July 2018, Kubrick's interpretation of the ending scene was presented after being newly found in an early interview.

== Openness to interpretation ==
Kubrick encouraged people to explore their own interpretations of the film, and refused to explain "what really happened" in the movie, preferring instead to let audiences embrace their own ideas and theories. In a 1968 interview with Playboy, Kubrick stated:

You're free to speculate as you wish about the philosophical and allegorical meaning of the film—and such speculation is one indication that it has succeeded in gripping the audience at a deep level—but I don't want to spell out a verbal road map for 2001 that every viewer will feel obligated to pursue or else fear he's missed the point.

Neither of the two creators equated openness to interpretation with meaninglessness, although it might seem that Clarke implied as much when he stated, shortly after the film's release, "If anyone understands it on the first viewing, we've failed in our intention." When told of the comment, Kubrick said "I believe he made it [the comment] facetiously. The very nature of the visual experience in 2001 is to give the viewer an instantaneous, visceral reaction that does not—and should not—require further amplification." When told that Kubrick had called his comment 'facetious', Clarke responded

I still stand by this remark, which does not mean one can't enjoy the movie completely the first time around. What I meant was, of course, that because we were dealing with the mystery of the universe, and with powers and forces greater than man's comprehension, then by definition they could not be totally understandable. Yet there is at least one logical structure—and sometimes more than one—behind everything that happens on the screen in "2001", and the ending does not consist of random enigmas, some critics to the contrary.

In a subsequent discussion of the film with Joseph Gelmis, Kubrick said his main aim was to avoid "intellectual verbalization" and reach "the viewer's subconscious". He said he did not deliberately strive for ambiguity, that it was simply an inevitable outcome of making the film non-verbal, though he acknowledged that this ambiguity was an invaluable asset to the film. He was willing then to give a fairly straightforward explanation of the plot on what he called the "simplest level", but unwilling to discuss the metaphysical interpretation of the film which he felt should be left up to the individual viewer.

== Clarke's novel as explanation ==
Arthur C. Clarke's novel of the same name was developed simultaneously with the film, though published after the film's release. It seems to explain the ending of the film more clearly. Clarke's novel explicitly identifies the monolith as a tool created by extraterrestrials that have been through many stages of evolution, moving from organic forms, through biomechanics, and finally to a state of pure energy. The book explains the monolith much more specifically than the movie, depicting the first (on Earth) as a device capable of inducing a higher level of consciousness by directly interacting with the brain of pre-humans approaching it, the second (on the Moon) as an alarm signal designed to alert its creators that humanity had reached a sufficient technological level for space travel, and the third (near Jupiter in the movie but on a satellite of Saturn in the novel) as a gateway or portal to allow travel to other parts of the galaxy. It depicts Bowman traveling through some kind of interstellar switching station which the book refers to as "Grand Central," in which travelers go into a central hub and then are routed to their individual destinations. The book also depicts a crucial utterance by Bowman when he enters the portal via the monolith; his last statement is "my God!—it's full of stars!" This statement is not shown in the movie, but becomes crucial in the 1984 sequel 2010: The Year We Make Contact, based on the novel 2010: Odyssey Two.

The book reveals that these aliens travel the cosmos assisting lesser species to take evolutionary steps. Bowman explores the hotel room methodically, and deduces that it is a kind of zoo created by aliens—fabricated from information derived from television transmissions from Earth intercepted by the TMA-1 monolith—in which he is being studied by the invisible alien entities. He examines some food items provided for him, and notes that they are edible, yet clearly not made of any familiar substance from Earth. Kubrick's film leaves all this unstated. Although not included in the movie, Kubrick did originally plan to have aliens portrayed in the movie, and only cut the idea after deciding that it was too hard to do it with special and practical effects.

Physicist Freeman Dyson urged those baffled by the film to read Clarke's novel:

After seeing Space Odyssey, I read Arthur Clarke's book. I found the book gripping and intellectually satisfying, full of the tension and clarity which the movie lacks. All the parts of the movie that are vague and unintelligible, especially the beginning and the end, become clear and convincing in the book. So I recommend to my middle-aged friends who find the movie bewildering that they should read the book; their teenage kids don't need to.

Clarke himself used to recommend reading the book, saying "I always used to tell people, 'Read the book, see the film, and repeat the dose as often as necessary'", although, as his biographer Neil McAleer points out, he was promoting sales of his book at the time. Elsewhere he said, "You will find my interpretation in the novel; it is not necessarily Kubrick's. Nor is his necessarily the 'right' one – whatever that means."

Film critic Penelope Houston noted in 1971 that the novel differs in many key respects from the film, and as such, it perhaps should not be regarded as the skeleton key to unlock it.

Stanley Kubrick was less inclined to cite the book as a definitive interpretation of the film, but he also frequently refused to discuss any possible deeper meanings during interviews. During an interview with Joseph Gelmis in 1969, Kubrick explained:

It's a totally different kind of experience, of course, and there are a number of differences between the book and the movie. The novel, for example, attempts to explain things much more explicitly than the film does, which is inevitable in a verbal medium. The novel came about after we did a 130-page prose treatment of the film at the very outset. This initial treatment was subsequently changed in the screenplay, and the screenplay in turn was altered during the making of the film. But Arthur took all the existing material, plus an impression of some of the rushes, and wrote the novel. As a result, there's a difference between the novel and the film. ... I think that the divergencies between the two works are interesting. Actually, it was an unprecedented situation for someone to do an essentially original literary work based on glimpses and segments of a film he had not yet seen in its entirety.

Author Vincent LoBrutto, in Stanley Kubrick: A Biography, was inclined to note creative differences leading to a separation of meaning for book and film:

The film took on its own life as it was being made, and Clarke became increasingly irrelevant. Kubrick could probably have shot 2001 from a treatment, since most of what Clarke wrote, in particular some windy voice-overs which explained the level of intelligence reached by the ape men, the geological state of the world at the dawn of man, the problems of life on the Discovery and much more, was discarded during the last days of editing, along with the explanation of HAL's breakdown."

== Religious interpretations ==
In an interview for Rolling Stone magazine, Kubrick said "On the deepest psychological level the film's plot symbolizes the search for God, and it finally postulates what is little less than a scientific definition of God . . . The film revolves around this metaphysical conception, and the realistic hardware and the documentary feelings about everything were necessary in order to undermine your built-in resistance to the poetical concept."

When asked by Eric Nordern in Kubrick's interview with Playboy if 2001: A Space Odyssey was a religious film, Kubrick elaborated:

I will say that the God concept is at the heart of 2001 but not any traditional, anthropomorphic image of God. I don't believe in any of Earth's monotheistic religions, but I do believe that one can construct an intriguing scientific definition of God, once you accept the fact that there are approximately 100 billion stars in our galaxy alone, that each star is a life-giving sun and that there are approximately 100 billion galaxies in just the visible universe. Given a planet in a stable orbit, not too hot and not too cold, and given a few billion years of chance chemical reactions created by the interaction of a sun's energy on the planet's chemicals, it's fairly certain that life in one form or another will eventually emerge. It's reasonable to assume that there must be, in fact, countless billions of such planets where biological life has arisen, and the odds of some proportion of such life developing intelligence are high. Now, the Sun is by no means an old star, and its planets are mere children in cosmic age, so it seems likely that there are billions of planets in the universe not only where intelligent life is on a lower scale than man but other billions where it is approximately equal and others still where it is hundreds of thousands of millions of years in advance of us. When you think of the giant technological strides that man has made in a few millennia—less than a microsecond in the chronology of the universe—can you imagine the evolutionary development that much older life forms have taken? They may have progressed from biological species, which are fragile shells for the mind at best, into immortal machine entities—and then, over innumerable eons, they could emerge from the chrysalis of matter transformed into beings of pure energy and spirit. Their potentialities would be limitless and their intelligence ungraspable by humans.

In the same interview, he also blames the poor critical reaction to 2001 as follows:

Perhaps there is a certain element of the lumpen literati that is so dogmatically atheist and materialist and Earth-bound that it finds the grandeur of space and the myriad mysteries of cosmic intelligence anathema.

In a 1980 interview that remained obscure until being rediscovered in 2018, Kubrick explained the intent of the film's ending. God-like beings of "pure energy and intelligence" place the astronaut in a human zoo, where he passes his entire life with "no sense of time". After they eventually finish with him, he is "transformed into some kind of super being and sent back to Earth, transformed and made into some sort of superman ... It is the pattern of a great deal of mythology, and that is what we were trying to suggest."

== Allegorical interpretations ==
The film has been seen by many people not only as a literal story about evolution and space adventures, but as an allegorical representation of aspects of philosophical, religious or literary concepts.

=== Nietzsche allegory ===
Friedrich Nietzsche's philosophical tract Thus Spoke Zarathustra, about the potential of mankind, is directly referred to by the use of Richard Strauss's musical piece of the same name. Nietzsche writes that man is a bridge between the ape and the Übermensch. In an interview in The New York Times, Kubrick gave credence to interpretations of 2001 based on Zarathustra when he said: "Somebody said man is the missing link between primitive apes and civilized human beings. You might say that is inherent in the story too. We are semicivilized, capable of cooperation and affection, but needing some sort of transfiguration into a higher form of life. Man is really in a very unstable condition." Moreover, in the chapter Of the Three Metamorphoses, Nietzsche identifies the child as the last step before the Uberman (after the camel and the lion), lending further support to this interpretation in light of the 'star-child' who appears in the final scenes of the movie.

Nietzsche's Zarathustra includes this passage, which closely describes Bowman blowing the space pod's door by pressing three buttons (two times):

"Thrice did there peal at the gate like thunder, and thrice did the vaults resound and howl again. I pressed the key, then did a roaring wind tear the folds apart: whistling, whizzing, and piercing".

Donald MacGregor has analysed the film in terms of a different work, The Birth of Tragedy, in which Nietzsche refers to the human conflict between the Apollonian and Dionysian modes of being. The Apollonian side of man is rational, scientific, sober, and self-controlled. For Nietzsche a purely Apollonian mode of existence is problematic, since it undercuts the instinctual side of man. The Apollonian man lacks a sense of wholeness, immediacy, and primal joy. It is not good for a culture to be either wholly Apollonian or Dionysian. While the world of the apes at the beginning of 2001 is Dionysian, the world of travel to the Moon is wholly Apollonian, and HAL is an entirely Apollonian entity. Kubrick's film came out just a year before the Woodstock rock festival, a wholly Dionysian affair. MacGregor argues that David Bowman in his transformation has regained his Dionysian side.

=== Conception allegory ===
The Star Child looking at the Earth

2001 has also been described as an allegory of human conception, birth, and death. In part, this can be seen through the final moments of the film, which are defined by the image of the "star child", an in utero fetus that draws on the work of Lennart Nilsson. The star child signifies a "great new beginning", and is depicted naked and ungirded, but with its eyes wide open.

New Zealand journalist Scott MacLeod sees parallels between the spaceship's journey and the physical act of conception. We have the long, bulb-headed spaceship as a sperm, and the destination planet Jupiter (or the monolith floating near it) as the egg, and the meeting of the two as the trigger for the growth of a new race of man (the "star child"). The lengthy pyrotechnic light show witnessed by David Bowman, which has puzzled many reviewers, is seen by MacLeod as Kubrick's attempt at visually depicting the moment of conception, when the "star child" comes into being.

Taking the allegory further, MacLeod argues that the final scenes in which Bowman appears to see a rapidly ageing version of himself through a "time warp" is actually Bowman witnessing the withering and death of his own species. The old race of man is about to be replaced by the "star child", which was conceived by the meeting of the spaceship and Jupiter. MacLeod also sees irony in man as a creator (of HAL) on the brink of being usurped by his own creation. By destroying HAL, man symbolically rejects his role as creator and steps back from the brink of his own destruction.

Similarly, in his book, The Making of Kubrick's 2001, author Jerome Agel puts forward the interpretation that Discovery One represents both a body (with vertebrae) and a sperm cell, with Bowman being the "life" in the cell which is passed on. In this interpretation, Jupiter represents both a female and an ovum.

== The Monolith ==
As with many elements of the film, the iconic monolith has been subject to numerous interpretations, including religious, alchemical, historical, and evolutionary. To some extent, the very way in which it appears and is presented allows the viewer to project onto it all manner of ideas relating to the film. The Monolith in the movie seems to represent and even trigger epic transitions in the history of human evolution, evolution of humans from ape-like beings to civilised people, hence the odyssey of humankind.

Vincent LoBrutto's biography of Kubrick notes that for many, Clarke's novel is the key to understanding the monolith. Similarly, Geduld observes that "the monolith ...has a very simple explanation in Clarke's novel", though she later asserts that even the novel does not fully explain the ending.

Rolling Stone reviewer Bob McClay sees the film as a four-movement symphony, its story told with "deliberate realism". Carolyn Geduld believes that what "structurally unites all four episodes of the film" is the monolith, the film's largest and most unresolvable enigma. Each time the monolith is shown, man transcends to a different level of cognition, linking the primeval, futuristic and mystic segments of the film. McClay's Rolling Stone review notes a parallelism between the monolith's first appearance in which tool usage is imparted to the apes and the completion of "another evolution" in the fourth and final encounter with the monolith. In a similar vein, Tim Dirks ends his synopsis saying "The cyclical evolution from ape to man to spaceman to angel-starchild-superman is complete".

The monolith appears four times in 2001: A Space Odyssey: on the African savanna, on the Moon, in space orbiting Jupiter, and near Bowman's bed before his transformation. After the first encounter with the monolith, we see the leader of the apes have a quick flashback to the monolith after which he picks up a bone and uses it to smash other bones. Its usage as a weapon enables his tribe to defeat the other tribe of apes occupying the water hole who have not learned how to use bones as weapons. After this victory, the ape-leader throws his bone into the air, after which the scene shifts to an orbiting weapon four million years later, implying that the discovery of the bone as a weapon inaugurated human evolution, hence the much more advanced orbiting weapon four million years later.

The first and second encounters of humanity with the monolith have visual elements in common; both apes, and later astronauts, touch the monolith gingerly with their hands, and both sequences conclude with near-identical images of the Sun appearing directly over the monolith (the first with a crescent moon adjacent to it in the sky, the second with a near-identical crescent Earth in the same position), both echoing the Sun–Earth–Moon alignment seen at the very beginning of the film. The second encounter also suggests the triggering of the monolith's radio signal to Jupiter by the presence of humans, echoing the premise of Clarke's source story "The Sentinel".

In the most literal narrative sense, as found in the concurrently written novel, the Monolith is a tool, an artifact of an alien civilisation. It comes in many sizes and appears in many places, always in the purpose of advancing intelligent life. Arthur C. Clarke has referred to it as "the alien Swiss Army Knife"; or as Heywood Floyd speculates in the 1984 film 2010, "an emissary for an intelligence beyond ours. A shape of some kind for something that has no shape."

The fact that the first tool used by the protohumans is a weapon to commit murder is only one of the challenging evolutionary and philosophic questions posed by the film. The tool's link to the present day is made by the famous match cut from the bone/tool flying into the air, to a weapon orbiting the Earth. At the time of the movie's making, the space race was in full swing, and the use of space and technology for war and destruction was seen as a great challenge of the future.

But the use of tools also allowed mankind to survive and flourish over the next four million years, at which point the monolith makes its second appearance, this time on the Moon. Upon excavation, after remaining buried beneath the lunar surface for four million years, the monolith is examined by humans for the first time, and it emits a powerful radio signal—the target of which becomes Discovery One's mission.

In reading Clarke or Kubrick's comments, this is the most straightforward of the monolith's appearances. It is "calling home" to say, in effect, "they're here!" Some species visited long ago has not only evolved intelligence, but intelligence sufficient to achieve space travel. Humanity has left its cradle, and is ready for the next step. This is the point of connection with Clarke's 1951 short story, "The Sentinel", originally cited as the basis for the entire film.

The third time we see a monolith marks the beginning of the film's most cryptic and psychedelic sequence, interpretations of the last two monolith appearances are as varied as the film's viewers. Is it a "star gate," some giant cosmic router or transporter? Are all of these visions happening inside Bowman's mind? And why does he wind up in some cosmic hotel suite at the end of it?

According to Michael Hollister in his book Hollyworld, the path beyond the infinite is introduced by the vertical alignment of planets and moons with a perpendicular monolith forming a cross, as if the astronaut is about to become a new saviour. Bowman lives out his years alone in a neoclassical room, brightly lit from underneath, that evokes the Age of Enlightenment, decorated with classical art.

As Bowman's life quickly passes in this neoclassical room, the monolith makes its final appearance: standing at the foot of his bed as he approaches death. He raises a finger toward the monolith, a gesture that alludes to the Michelangelo painting of The Creation of Adam, with the monolith representing God.

The monolith is the subject of the film's final line of dialogue (spoken at the end of the "Jupiter Mission" segment): "Its origin and purpose still a total mystery". Reviewers McClay and Roger Ebert have noted that the monolith is the main element of mystery in the film, Ebert writing of "The shock of the monolith's straight edges and square corners among the weathered rocks", and describing the apes warily circling it as prefiguring man reaching "for the stars". Patrick Webster suggests the final line relates to how the film should be approached as a whole, noting "The line appends not merely to the discovery of the monolith on the moon, but to our understanding of the film in the light of the ultimate questions it raises about the mystery of the universe."

Gerard Loughlin claimed in a 2003 book that the monolith is Kubrick's representation of the cinema screen itself: "it is a cinematic conceit, for turn the monolith on its side and one has the letterbox of the cinemascope screen, the blank rectangle on which the star-child appears, as does the entirety of Kubrick’s film." The internet-based film critic Rob Ager later produced a video essay also espousing this theory. The academic Dan Leberg complained that Ager had not credited Loughlin.

== HAL 9000 ==
Artist's rendering of HAL 9000's camera eye

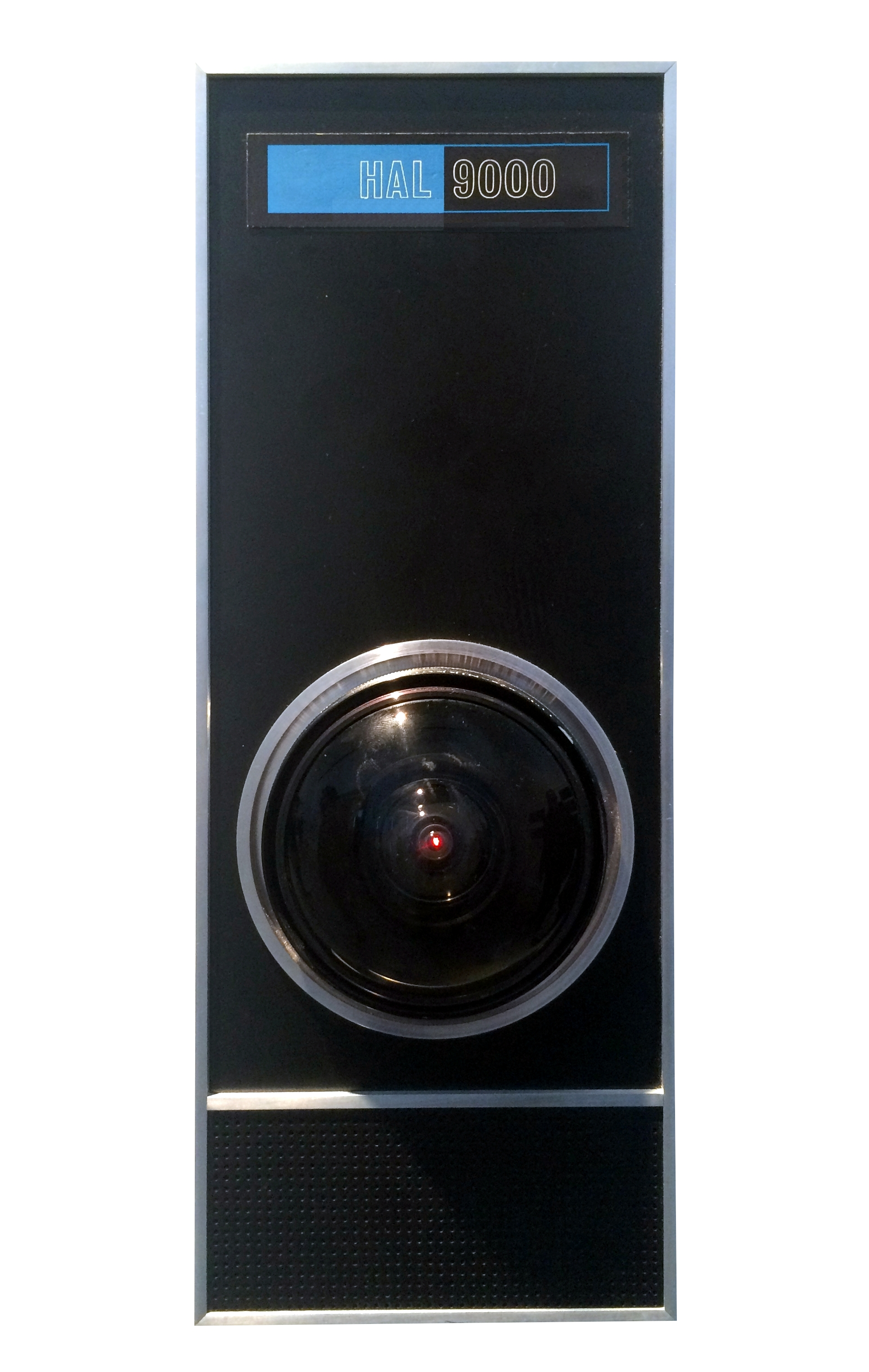
HAL 9000 interface plate with camera lens eye mounted

The intelligent supercomputer HAL 9000 has been compared to Frankenstein's monster. According to film critic John Thurman, HAL's very existence is an abomination, much like Frankenstein's monster. "While perhaps not overtly monstrous, HAL’s true character is hinted at by his physical 'deformity'. Like a Cyclops he relies upon a single eye, examples of which are installed throughout the ship. The eye’s warped wide-angle point-of-view is shown several times—notably in the drawings of hibernating astronauts (all of whom HAL will later murder)."

Kubrick underscores the Frankenstein connection with a scene that virtually reproduces the style and content of a scene from James Whale's 1931 Frankenstein. The scene in which Frankenstein's monster is first shown on the loose is borrowed to depict the first murder by HAL of a member of Discovery One's crew—the empty pod, under HAL's control, extends its arms and "hands", and goes on a "rampage" directed towards astronaut Poole. In each case, it is the first time the truly odious nature of the "monster" can be recognised as such, and only appears about halfway through the film.

Clarke has suggested in interviews, his original novel, and in a rough draft of the shooting script that HAL's orders to lie to the astronauts (more specifically, concealing the true nature of the mission) drove him "insane". The novel does include the phrase "He [HAL] had been living a lie"—a difficult situation for an entity programmed to be as reliable as possible. Or as desirable, given his programming to "only win 50% of the time" at chess, in order for the human astronauts to feel competitive. Clarke also gives an explanation of the ill-effects of HAL being ordered to lie in computer terms as well as psychological terms, stating HAL is caught in a "Möbius feedback loop."

While the film remains ambiguous, one can see evidence in the film that since HAL was instructed to deceive the mission astronauts as to the actual nature of the mission and that deception opens a Pandora's box of possibilities. During a game of chess, although easily victorious over Frank Poole, HAL makes a subtle mistake in the use of descriptive notation to describe a move, and when describing a forced mate, fails to mention moves that Poole could make to delay defeat. Poole is seen to be mouthing his moves to himself during the game and it is later revealed that HAL can lip read. HAL's conversation with Dave Bowman just before the diagnostic error of the AE-35 unit that communicates with Earth is an almost paranoid question and answer session ("Surely one could not be unaware of the strange stories circulating...rumors about something being dug up on the moon...") where HAL skirts close to the pivotal issue concerning which he is concealing information. When Dave states "You're working up your crew psychology report", HAL takes a few seconds to respond in the affirmative. Immediately following this exchange, he errs in diagnosing the antenna unit. HAL has been introduced to the unique and alien concept of human dishonesty. He does not have a sufficiently layered understanding of human motives to grasp the need for this and trudging through the tangled web of lying complications, he falls prey to human error.

The follow-up film 2010 further elaborates Clarke's explanation of HAL's breakdown. While HAL was under orders to deny the true mission with the crew, he was programmed at a deep level to be completely accurate and infallible. This conflict between two key directives led to him taking any measures to prevent Bowman and Poole finding out about this deception. Once Poole had been killed, others were eliminated to remove any witnesses to his failure to complete the mission.

One interesting aspect of HAL's plight, noted by Roger Ebert, is that this supposedly perfect computer actually behaves in the most human fashion of all of the characters. He has reached human intelligence levels, and seems to have developed human traits of paranoia, jealousy and other emotions. By contrast, the human characters act like machines, coolly performing their tasks in a mechanical fashion, whether they are mundane tasks of operating their craft or even under extreme duress as Dave must be following HAL's murder of Frank. For instance, Frank Poole watches a birthday transmission from his parents with what appears to be complete apathy.

Although the film leaves it mysterious, early script drafts made clear that HAL's breakdown is triggered by authorities on Earth who order him to withhold information from the astronauts about the purpose of the mission (this is also explained in the film's sequel 2010). Frederick Ordway, Kubrick's science advisor and technical consultant, stated that in an earlier script Poole tells HAL there is "... something about this mission that we weren't told. Something the rest of the crew knows and that you know. We would like to know whether this is true", to which HAL responds: "I'm sorry, Frank, but I don't think I can answer that question without knowing everything that all of you know." HAL then falsely predicts a failure of the hardware maintaining radio contact with Earth (the source of HAL's difficult orders) during the broadcast of Frank Poole's birthday greetings from his parents.

The final script removed this explanation, but it is hinted at when HAL asks David Bowman if Bowman is bothered by the "oddities" and "tight security" surrounding the mission. After Bowman concludes that HAL is dutifully drawing up the "crew psychology report", the computer makes his false prediction of hardware failure. Another hint occurs at the moment of HAL's deactivation when a video reveals the purpose of the mission.

== Military nature of orbiting satellites ==
Stanley Kubrick originally intended, when the film does its famous match-cut from prehistoric bone-weapon to orbiting satellite, that the latter and the three additional satellites seen be established as orbiting nuclear weapons by a voice-over narrator talking about nuclear stalemate. Further, Kubrick intended that the Star Child would detonate the weapons at the end of the film. Over time, Kubrick decided that this would create too many associations with his previous film Dr. Strangelove and he decided not to make it so obvious that they were "war machines". Kubrick was also confronted with the fact that, during the production of the film, the US and USSR had agreed not to put any nuclear weapons into outer space by signing the Outer Space Treaty.

Alexander Walker in a book he wrote with Kubrick's assistance and authorisation, states that Kubrick eventually decided that as nuclear weapons the bombs had "no place at all in the film's thematic development", now being an "orbiting red herring" which would "merely have raised irrelevant questions to suggest this as a reality of the twenty-first century".

In the Canadian TV documentary 2001 and Beyond, Clarke stated that not only was the military purpose of the satellites "not spelled out in the film, there is no need for it to be", repeating later in this documentary that "Stanley didn't want to have anything to do with bombs after Dr. Strangelove".

In a New York Times interview in 1968, Kubrick merely referred to the satellites as "spacecraft", as does the interviewer, but he observed that the match-cut from bone to spacecraft shows they evolved from "bone-as-weapon", stating "It's simply an observable fact that all of man's technology grew out of his discovery of the weapon-tool".

Nothing in the film calls attention to the purpose of the satellites. James Griffith, in a footnote in his book Adaptations As Imitations: Films from Novels, wrote "I would wonder, for instance, how several critics, commenting on the match-cut that links humanity's prehistory and future, can identify—without reference to Clarke's novel—the satellite as a nuclear weapon".

Arthur C. Clarke, in the TV documentary 2001: The Making of a Myth, described the bone-to-satellite sequence in the film, saying "The bone goes up and turns into what is supposed to be an orbiting space bomb, a weapon in space. Well, that isn't made clear, we just assume it's some kind of space vehicle in a three-million-year jump cut". Former NASA research assistant Steven Pietrobon wrote "The orbital craft seen as we make the leap from the Dawn of Man to contemporary times are supposed to be weapons platforms carrying nuclear devices, though the movie does not make this clear."

The vast majority of film critics, including noted Kubrick authority Michel Ciment, interpreted the satellites as generic spacecraft (possibly Moon bound).

The perception that the satellites are nuclear weapons persists in the minds of some viewers (and some space scientists). Due to their appearance there are statements by members of the production staff who still refer to them as weapons. Walker, in his book Stanley Kubrick, Director, noted that although the bombs no longer fit in with Kubrick's revised thematic concerns, "nevertheless from the national markings still visible on the first and second space vehicles we see, we can surmise that they are the Russian and American bombs."

Similarly, Walker in a later essay stated that two of the spacecraft seen circling Earth were meant to be nuclear weapons, after asserting that early scenes of the film "imply" nuclear stalemate. Pietrobon, who was a consultant on 2001 to the Web site Starship Modeler regarding the film's props, observes small details on the satellites such as Air Force insignia and "cannons".

In the film, United States Air Force insignia, and flag insignia of China and Germany (including what appears to be an Iron Cross) can be seen on three of the satellites, which correspond to three of the bombs' stated countries of origin in a widely circulated early draft of the script.

Production staff who continue to refer to "bombs" (in addition to Clarke) include production designer Harry Lange (previously a space industry illustrator), who has since the film's release shown his original production sketches for all of the spacecraft to Simon Atkinson, who refers to seeing "the orbiting bombs". Fred Ordway, the film's science consultant, sent a memo to Kubrick after the film's release listing suggested changes to the film, mostly complaining about missing narration and shortened scenes. One entry reads: "Without warning, we cut to the orbiting bombs. And to a short, introductory narration, missing in the present version". Multiple production staff aided in the writing of Jerome Agel's 1970 book on the making of the film, in which captions describe the objects as "orbiting satellites carrying nuclear weapons" Actor Gary Lockwood (astronaut Frank Poole) in the audio DVD commentary says the first satellite is an armed weapon, making the famous match-cut from bone to satellite a "weapon-to-weapon cut". Several recent reviews of the film mostly of the DVD release refer to armed satellites, possibly influenced by Gary Lockwood's audio commentary.

A few published works by scientists on the subject of space exploration or space weapons tangentially discuss 2001: A Space Odyssey and assume at least some of the orbiting satellites are space weapons. Indeed, details worked out with input from space industry experts, such as the structure on the first satellite that Pietrobon refers to as a "conning tower", match the original concept sketch drawn for the nuclear bomb platform. Modelers label them in diverse ways. On the one hand, the 2001 exhibit (given in that year) at the Tech Museum in San Jose and now online (for a subscription) referred merely to "satellites", while a special modelling exhibition at the exhibition hall at Porte de Versailles in Paris also held in 2001 (called 2001 l'odyssée des maquettes (2001: A Modeler's Odyssey)) overtly described their reconstructions of the first satellite as the "US Orbiting Weapons Platform". Some, but not all, space model manufacturers or amateur model builders refer to these entities as bombs.

The perception that the satellites are bombs persists in the mind of some but by no means all commentators on the film. This may affect one's reading of the film as a whole. Noted Kubrick authority Michel Ciment, in discussing Kubrick's attitude toward human aggression and instinct, observes "The bone cast into the air by the ape (now become a man) is transformed at the other extreme of civilization, by one of those abrupt ellipses characteristic of the director, into a spacecraft on its way to the moon." In contrast to Ciment's reading of a cut to a serene "other extreme of civilization", science fiction novelist Robert Sawyer, speaking in the Canadian documentary 2001 and Beyond, sees it as a cut from a bone to a nuclear weapons platform, explaining that "what we see is not how far we've leaped ahead, what we see is that today, '2001', and four million years ago on the African veldt, it's exactly the same—the power of mankind is the power of its weapons. It's a continuation, not a discontinuity in that jump."

Kubrick, notoriously reluctant to provide any explanation of his work, never publicly stated the intended functions of the orbiting satellites, preferring instead to let the viewer surmise what their purpose might be.

It has been pointed out that Kubrick's aforementioned narration regarding the satellites describes the nuclear stalemate by comparing it to an airline with a perfect safety record, "in that no one expected it to last forever", and that, effectively, just before the BBC-12 interview broadcast, it seems that David is reading a newspaper article on his tablet-like "newspad" about an advanced airliner aircraft having gone missing, something that has been speculated to be a subtle implication that nuclear peace is coming to an end.

== Sources ==
- Walker, Alexander (2000). Stanley Kubrick, director. New York: W.W. Norton and Company. ISBN 0-393-32119-3.
