= Katzenfurt =

- Ortsteil of Ehringshausen
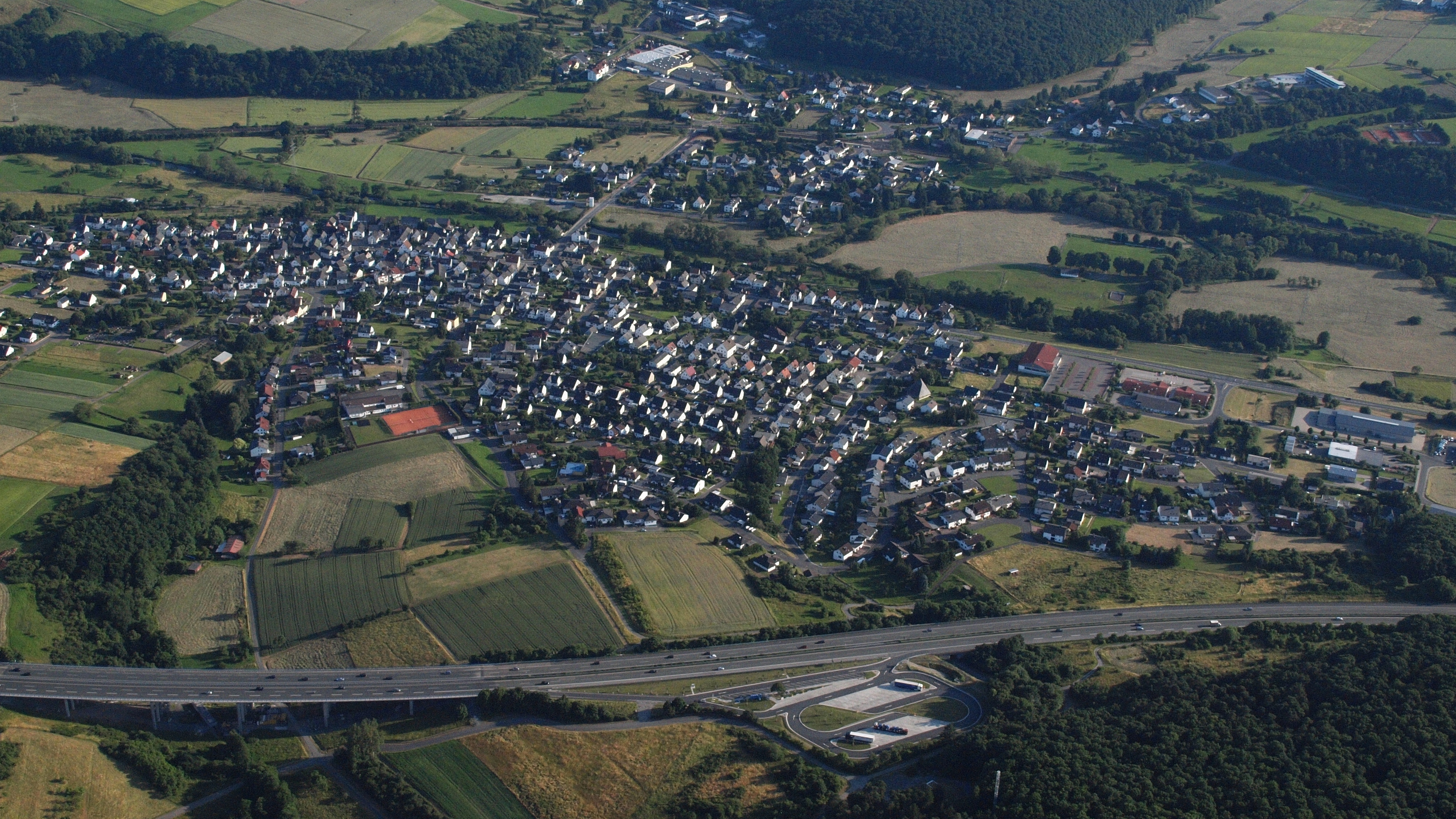
- View of Katzenfurt

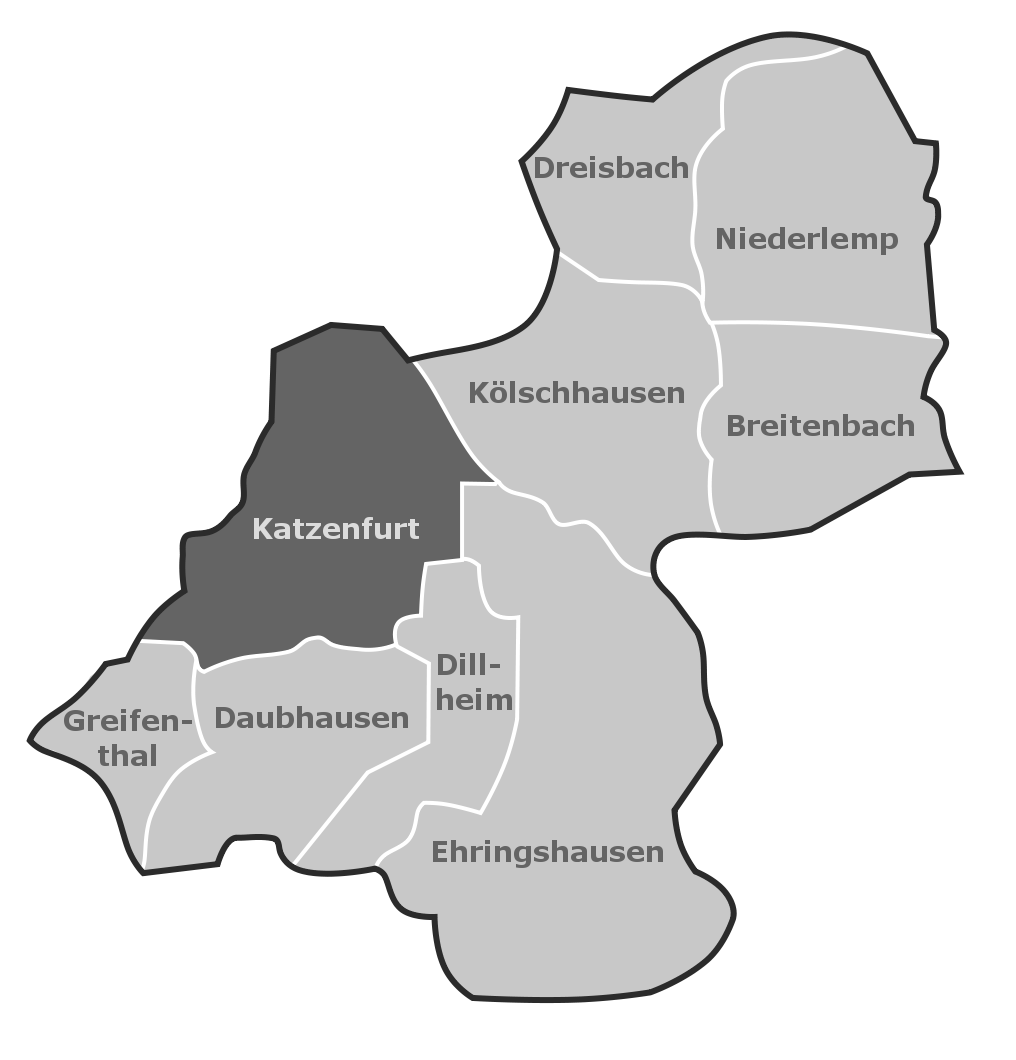
- Location within Ehringshausen
- Interactive map of Katzenfurt
- Location within Germany Location within Hesse
- Coordinates: 50°37′5″N 8°20′54″E
- Country: Germany
- State: Hesse
- District: Lahn-Dill-Kreis
- Municipality: Ehringshausen

Area
  - Total: 7.17 km^{2} (2.77 sq mi)
- Elevation: 186 m (610 ft)

Population (2015-12-31)
  - Total: 1,910
  - Density: 266/km^{2} (690/sq mi)
- Time zone: UTC+01:00 (CET)
  - Summer (DST): UTC+02:00 (CEST)
- Postal codes: 35360
- Dialling codes: 06449
- Website: Website Town

Katzenfurt is a village (Ortsteil) of the municipality of Ehringshausen. The name does not mean Katze (cat), but the name comes from the Chatten or Katten, an ancient Germanic tribe. Its first documented reference was in 1233 via Heinricus de Kaczenfurt, who was named as a witness to a sale of the estates to Grossholzheim and Kleinholzheim by Hartrad von Merenberg to Arnsburg Abbey.
