= Iron Way =

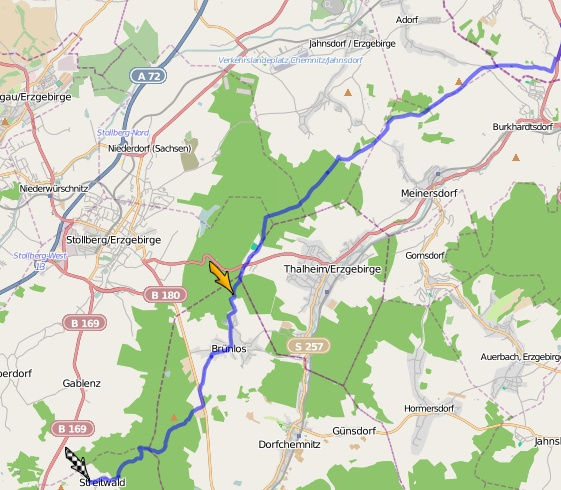
Map of the Iron Way

The Iron Way (German: Eisenweg) is a ridgeway in the Ore Mountains in central Europe whose historic route follows the Ore Mountain Northern Escarpment (Erzgebirgische Nordrandstufe).

According to local historic accounts, it is said to have been used in the Middle Ages for the transport of iron ore from the area around the Schneeberg.

The way, which is still signed today, starts at Katzenstein near Affalter and passes through the Streitwald to Tabakstanne, continuing through the municipal forest, past the monument of the Black Cross (Schwarzes Kreuz) to the hill of Harthauer Berg on the B 95 federal highway, south of Chemnitz.

Today, the Iron Way is a popular route for walkers and cyclists, linking the area south of Chemnitz with the trails of the central Ore Mountain region.

== Literature ==
- Zwischen Zwickauer Mulde und Geyerschem Wald. Edition no. 1 Akademie-Verlag Berlin, Berlin 1980 (Werte unserer Heimat. Vol. 31). p. 50.
- Zwischen Mülsengrund, Stollberg und Zwönitztal. Edition no. 1 Akademie-Verlag Berlin, Berlin 1981 (Werte unserer Heimat. Vol. 35). p. 102.
