= Jacob Katzenstein =

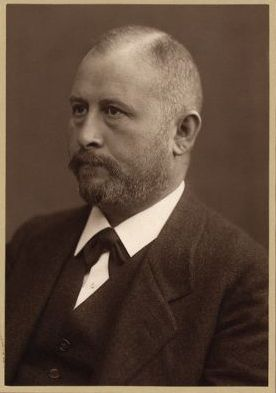
Jacob Katzenstein (1864-1921)

Jacob Katzenstein (January 7, 1864 – September 3, 1921) was a German otorhinolaryngologist born in Preußisch Oldendorf.

He studied medicine in Berlin and Freiburg im Breisgau, earning his doctorate in 1888. Afterwards he worked as assistant to otorhinolaryngologist Benno Baginsky (1848–1919) in Berlin. From 1909 he was a lecturer at the University of Berlin.

Katzenstein specialized in research of voice disorders and is known for physiological investigations of the larynx. In 1913 he became editor of the Archiv für experimentelle und klinische Phonetik (Archive for experimental and clinical phonetics).

== Selected publications ==
- Über die Medianstellung des Stimmbandes bei Recurrenslähmung (Virchow's Archiv 1892).
- Über die Innervation des m. crico-thyreoideus - On innervation of the median cricothyroids.
- Weitere Mitteilungen über die Innervation des m. crico-thyreoideus (1894) - New information on innervation of the median cricothyroids.
- Die Orthoskopie des Larynx (Archive for Laryngology IV) - Orthoscopy of the larynx.
- Die Autoskopie des Nasenrachenraums.
- Zur Frage der Posticuslähmung, (Part 1 with Arthur Kuttner, Archive for Laryngology VIII; Part 2 Ib. IX).
- Experimentelle Beiträge zur Physiologie des Kehlkopfs, (with Arthur Kuttner, Archive for Anatomy and Physiology 1899) - Experimental contributions to the physiology of the larynx.
