= Anita Kelsey =

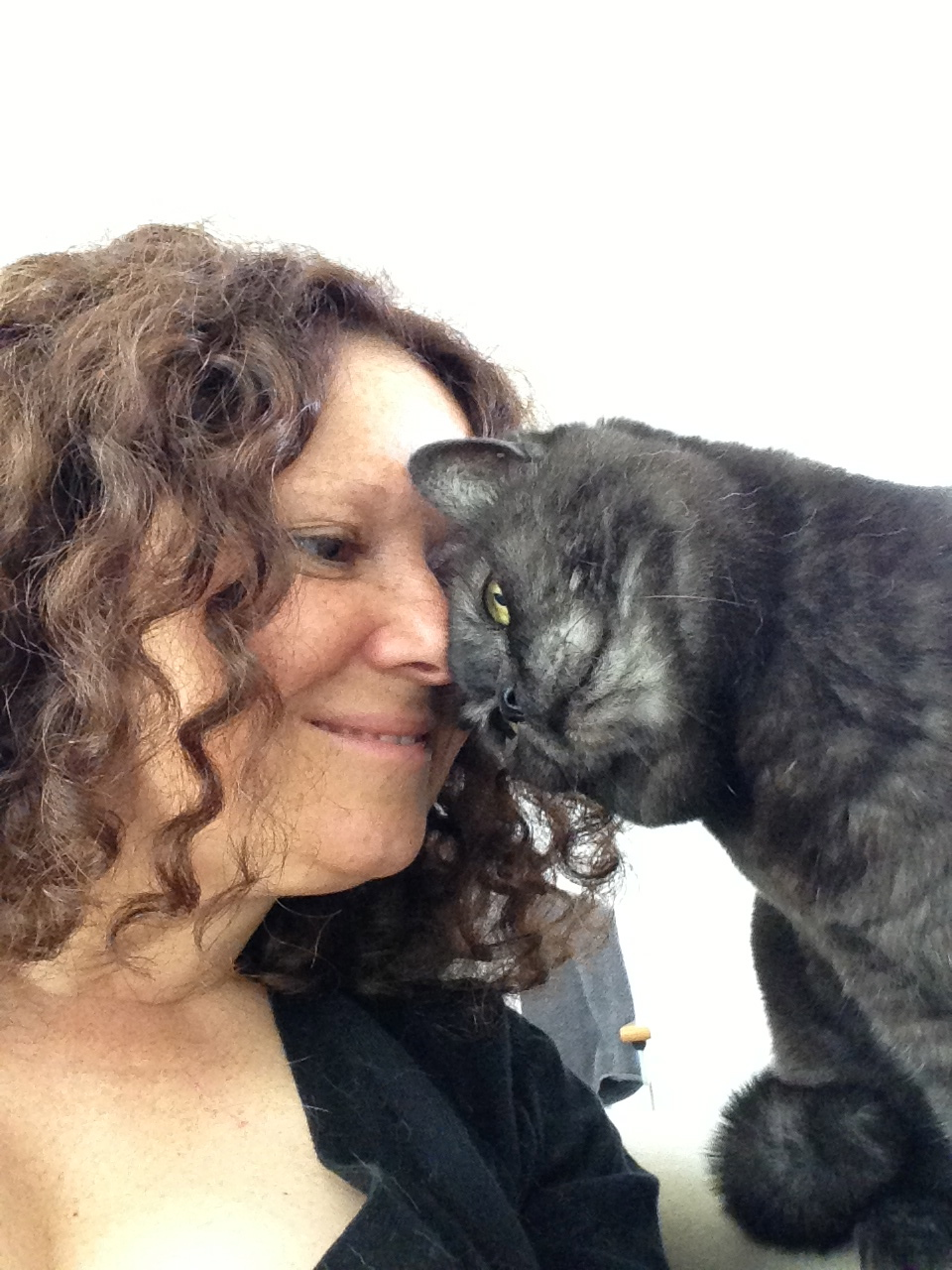
- Anita Kelsey, cat behaviourist

Background information
- Born: 1963 (age 62–63); Mitcham, England
- Genres: EDM; dance
- Occupations: Singer, songwriter, cat behaviourist
- Years active: 1997–present
- Website: http://www.catbehaviourist.com

Anita Kelsey /ˈkɛlsi/ is an English singer and songwriter whose vocals and top lines are featured on many hit dance records and feature films. Her voice has appeared as backup vocals for artists such as Kings of Leon, the Good, the Bad & the Queen, Razorlight, Boy George and the Spice Girls, as the featured vocalist on big screen productions such as Dark City, and more recently as the singer and songwriter for a series of successful dance projects. Since 2009 she has worked as a cat behaviour consultant.

== Music career ==
Kelsey appeared on the dance scene in 1997. She won the UK's MOBO Award for her first album on Dorado Records with UK garage musician Sunship. Her next single, "Try Me Out" from the second Sunship album, became a UK club hit and was an Agia Napa anthem of 2001. Kelsey also worked on two of Dorado label-mate Matt Cooper's Outside albums, penning the singles "If You Come with Me" and "Somewhere New".

In 1998, composer Trevor Jones asked Kelsey to perform on the soundtrack to sci-fi cult film Dark City. This resulted in American actress Jennifer Connelly miming to Kelsey's voice in two prominent scenes as well as the Kelsey rendition of "Sway" being featured on the end credits. (The director's cut of Dark City uses Connelly's vocals both in the film and the version in the credits.) The tracks "Sway" and "The Night Has 1000 Eyes" were included on the film's soundtrack, released on TVT Sountrax. Other soundtrack projects featuring Kelsey's voice include Bring Me the Head of Mavis Davis and Merlin.

More success came in 2002 for Kelsey's work with D*Note's "Shed My Skin". During that same year, she appeared in the opening scenes of the horror movie Long Time Dead in which she participates in a ouija board séance just before dying a horrific death.

In 2004, Kelsey signed to BMG Music Publishing.

In 2005, Markus Schulz teamed up with Kelsey to release the single "First Time" on Armada Music in the Netherlands. This led to the track being included on Schulz' debut album Without You Near, on which she sang on a second track, "Travelling Light". Schulz' second album, Progression (released 2007) featured a new collaboration with Kelsey, "On a Wave".

In 2006, Kelsey was approached by dance producer TTLC, also known as TDR (Tom de Ridder), to collaborate on electro track "Never Ever". This track was released by Belgian label Mostiko and has culminated in DJs such as Judge Jules and Sasha championing the Filterheadz remix (live and on their weekly shows on BBC Radio 1), as well as the Housetrap mix receiving heavy air rotation on Belgian national radio. Kelsey also co-wrote Virgin Records's Lost Witness singles "Home" and "Coming Down", performed by Tiff Lacey.

"Falling", co-written with First State, was included on Tiesto's In Search of Sunrise 6: Ibiza.

A collaboration, "Wicked World", with Dutch production duo Hardsoul resulted in the track being picked up by Fedde Le Grande to remix for his debut album, Sessions, released on Ministry of Sound in 2007. In 2010, she collaborated with producer Stonebridge and released a single called "Rescue Me".

== Later life ==
Kelsey changed her career in 2009 and studied to become a cat behaviourist. She runs a cat behaviour consultancy in London's Notting Hill after leaving Middlesex University with a first class honours degree in Feline Behaviour & Psychology. She is believed to be the first person in the UK to be awarded a first class degree in this field. In July 2016 she was awarded the Gerry Fowler prize by Middlesex University, for outstanding work in her studies and chosen field.

She is a member of the Canine and Feline Behaviour Association (CFBA). She also writes for various cat related magazines including Your Cat as well as online pet magazine Style Tails and UK cat blog Katzenworld. Her debut book Claws: Confessions of a Cat Groomer, was published by John Blake in September 2017.

Her current book Let's Talk About Cats. Conversations On Feline Behaviour was published in 2020.

== Awards ==
In 2018, Kelsey was awarded "Best Feline Behaviourist and Groomer" by Global Health & Pharma.

== Affiliations ==
In 2022, Kelsey worked with Amazon UK to create music designed to help relax cats.

== Discography ==
=== Singles ===
- "If You Come with Me" (Dorado Records 1993)
- "Do for You" (GRP 1993)
- "City Life" – Sunship (Filter 1997)
- "Into the Rainbow" – Sunship (Filter 1997)
- "Try Me Out" – Sunship (Filter 1998)
- "Heaven" – Sunship (Filter 1998)
- "Somewhere New" (Dorado 2001)
- "Shed My Skin" – D*Note (VC Recordings 2001)
- "Shed My Skin" – D*Note (News 2002)
- "Healing" – Cor Fijneman (Black Hole Recordings 2003)
- "Come Around Again" – Signum (Armada Music 2004)
- "Every Kiss" (Extrema 2004)
- "Have to Be with You" (News/541 2004)
- "The Unknown" (Vinyl Vice Ltd 2004)
- "First Time" – Markus Schulz (Armada Music 2005)
- "Fill Me Up" (Electrofly 2005)
- "Tauruscilus" (Armada Music 2005)
- "Freeze the Moment" (News/541 2005)
- "Colourless World" – Cor Fijneman (Black Hole Recordings 2005)
- "Travelling Light" – Markus Schulz (Armada Music 2005)
- "Good Lovin" (Armada Music/Fame 2005)
- "Airborne" (Baroque 2005)
- "Do You Think" (United Recordings 2005)
- "Don't Push Me Down" (Sony/BMG 2006)
- "Never Ever" (Mostiko/Progressions 2006)
- "Satisfy" (Bonzai 2006)
- "Calling You" (Noys 2006)
- "Slipping Away" (Terminal 4 2006)
- "Smile" (Afterglow 2007)
- "Wicked World" – Hardsoul (MOS 2007)
- "Falling" (First State)
- "Can't Sleep" (Be Yourself Music)
- "I Love It" – StoneBridge (StoneyBoy 2010)
- "Rescue Me" – Stonebridge & Chris Kaeser (StoneyBoy 2010)
- "What We Gonna Do" (Chris Kaeser & Max C 2010) – D*Tracks

=== Albums and compilation appearances ===
- Almost In (Dorado 1993)
- London Underground Vol. 3 (Bombastic Records 1993)
- Fine Gold (Dorado 1996)
- Sunship (Filter 1997)
- Elvis Never Meant Shit to Me (Filter 1998)
- Is This Real (Filter 1998)
- Trevor Jones - Dark City OST (TVT 1998)
- Ministry Present Platinum Collection (Ministry of Sound 1999)
- Twice as Nice in Ayia Napa (React 1999)
- Ayia Napa Fantasy Island (Telstar TV 2000)
- Creeds Vocalfusion (Pure Silk Records 2000)
- Kiss UK Garage (Universal Records 2000)
- Rewind – The Sound of UK Garage (Ministry of Sound 2000)
- Out of the Dark – Dorado (2001)
- Fuchsia Dog (Channel 4 2002)
- Solid Sounds Arno 2002 Vol. 1 (541 2002)
- The Chillout Sessions 3 (Ministry of Sound Australia 2002)
- TMF Megadance 2002/2 (541 2002)
- TMF Megadance 2002/3 (541 2002)
- XTC – Music for the Mind (Lightning Records 2002)
- Clube Casa Do Castelo (Som Livre Portugal 2003)
- Nueva Musica (Electric Monkey Records 2003)
- One Night at Glow – Washington D.C (Blackhole Recordings 2003)
- Super Mix 16 (Vidisco 2003)
- The Winter Chill Sessions Vol. 1 (Enter Records 2003)
- Heaven Deep Trance Essentials 2 (541 2004)
- Illusion at the Beach 2004 (Art Music Group 2004)
- Technics Summer Sessions 2004 (Vale Music 2004)
- The Best of Trance 2004 (Sony Music Media 2004)
- Trance Voices 12 – The Greatest Vocal Trance Anthems (Polystar Records 2004)
- Mellomania Vol. 1 (Toptrax Recordings 2004)
- Nova Era Caffe (Kaos Records 2004)
- Re:Vive Trance 01 (Re:Vive 2004)
- Serious Beats 45 (EMI Music Belgium 2004)
- Solid Sounds Arno 2004 Vol. 2 (541/Pias 2004)
- Super Tuning (Vidisco 2004)
- Trance – The Ultimate Collection 2004 Vol. 2 (Sony Music Media – Netherlands)
- Trance Energy 2004 (Universal TV 2004)
- Trance Nation 18: 10 Years Anniversary Edition (Silly Spider Music 2004)
- Trance Voices Vol. 12 (Polystar Records 2004)
- A State of Trance – The Collected 12" Mixes (Armada Music 2005)
- A State of Trance 2005 (Armada Music/BMG 2005)
- G-Pal Contra Anna Maria X – Back 2 Back Sessions Vol. 1 (Klik Records/Swift Records 2005)
- Grandmix 2004 (Sony Music Media –Netherlands 2005)
- Monologue (Black Hole Recordings 2005)
- Serious Beats 47 (541/PIAS Recordings 2005)
- Sunshine Live Vol. 15 (Toptrax Recordings 2005)
- The Lost World (Ultra Records 2005)
- Trance Voices Vol. 16 (Polystar Records 2005)
- Trance Voices Vol. 17 (Polystar Records 2005)
- Trance Master 4008 (Vision Soundcarriers 2005)
- Without You Near (Armada Music 2005)
- Dutch Trance Vol. 1 (Armada Music 2006)
- Ibiza 06 (Armada 2006)
- My Sound (Sony/BMG 2006)
- Planet Trance Ibiza Summer 2006 (Wagram 2006)
- Mixmania 2006#03 (EMI Music 2006)
- Technics DJ Set Vol. 15 (Klubbstyle Media 2006)
- Trance Voices Vol. 21 (Polystar Records 2006)
- What Ya Got 4 Me 2006/Supersonic (A State of Trance Limited 2006)
- Coldharbour Recordings – The Collected 12" Mixes / Volume 1 (Armada Music 2007)
- Sessions – Mixed By Fedde Le Grande (Ministry of Sound 2007)
- Techno Club Vol. 23 (Klubbstyle Media 2007)
- This Is Trance! 5 (Water Music Dance 2007)
- Time Frame (In Trance We Trust 2007)
- Trance Energy 2007 (ID&T 2007)
- Trance Voices Vol. 23 (Polystar 2007)
- Trancemaster 5006 (Vision Soundcarriers 2007)
- Tunnel Trance Force Vol. 40 (Sony BMG Germany 2007)
- Urban Trance Vol. 1 – The Ultimate Trance Selection (More Music 2007)
- In Search of Sunrise 6: Ibiza (Songbird 2007)
- 100 Hits Dancefloor (Vidisco 2008)
- Armada Best of 5 Years | 100 Tracks in the Mix (Armada 2008)
- Black Hole Recordings 10 Year Anniversary CD (Blackhole Recordings 2008)
- Dance. Dutch Dance Music 2008 (Buma Cultuur 2008)
- Dream Dance 46 (Sony BMG 2008)
- Garage Classics (Ministry of Sound 2008)
- In Search of Sunrise 7: Asia (Armani Exchange Exclusive) (Songbird 2008)
- Nightmusic Volume 3 (Adjusted Music 2008)
- Progression – Progressed (The Remixes) (Armada 2008)
- Record Dance Vol. 1 (Radio Record 2008)
- Rise 2008 (Central Station 2008)
- TBI: The Best in Vocal Trance (ZYX Music 2008)
- Technics DJ Set Volume 20 (Klubbstyle Media 2008)
- Top DJs 6 – Tiësto Presents Black Hole Recordings (Πρώτο ΘΕΜΑ 2008)
- Trance Classix Top 100 (Mostiko 2008)
- Tunes! Volume 1 (Cdjshop.com Ltd 2008)
- Without You Near (The Remixes) (Ultra Records 2008)
- Zillion Nr 16 (Digidance 2008)
- A State of Trance Year Mix 2005–2008 (Cloud 9 Dance 2009)
- Dream Dance – Lost Trance Classics (Sony BMG Music Entertainment Germany 2009)
- In Trance We Trust (405 Recordings 2009)
- Sensation – Wicked Wonderland (Dance-Tunes B.V., ID&T 2009)
- Signum 2009 Remixes Vol. 3 (Armada Music2009)
- Trance Empire 2010.1 (More Music 2009)
- The Essential Garage Collection (Ministry of Sound 2009)
- Energy 2010 – The Annual Trance (Energetic Records, TBA 2009)
- Tracks for Dave Pearce (Noys 2010)
- Ibiza 2010 – The Finest House Collection (Kontor Records 2010)
- International Departures Soundtracks (Armada Music 2010)
- Fresh Hits 2010 (Teta Making Music 2010)
- Disco Dance Hits Vol. 2 (Selected 2010)
- The Morning After (Stoney Boy Music 2010)
