= Katzenstein (Affalter) =

Coordinates: 50°39′16″N 12°45′29″E

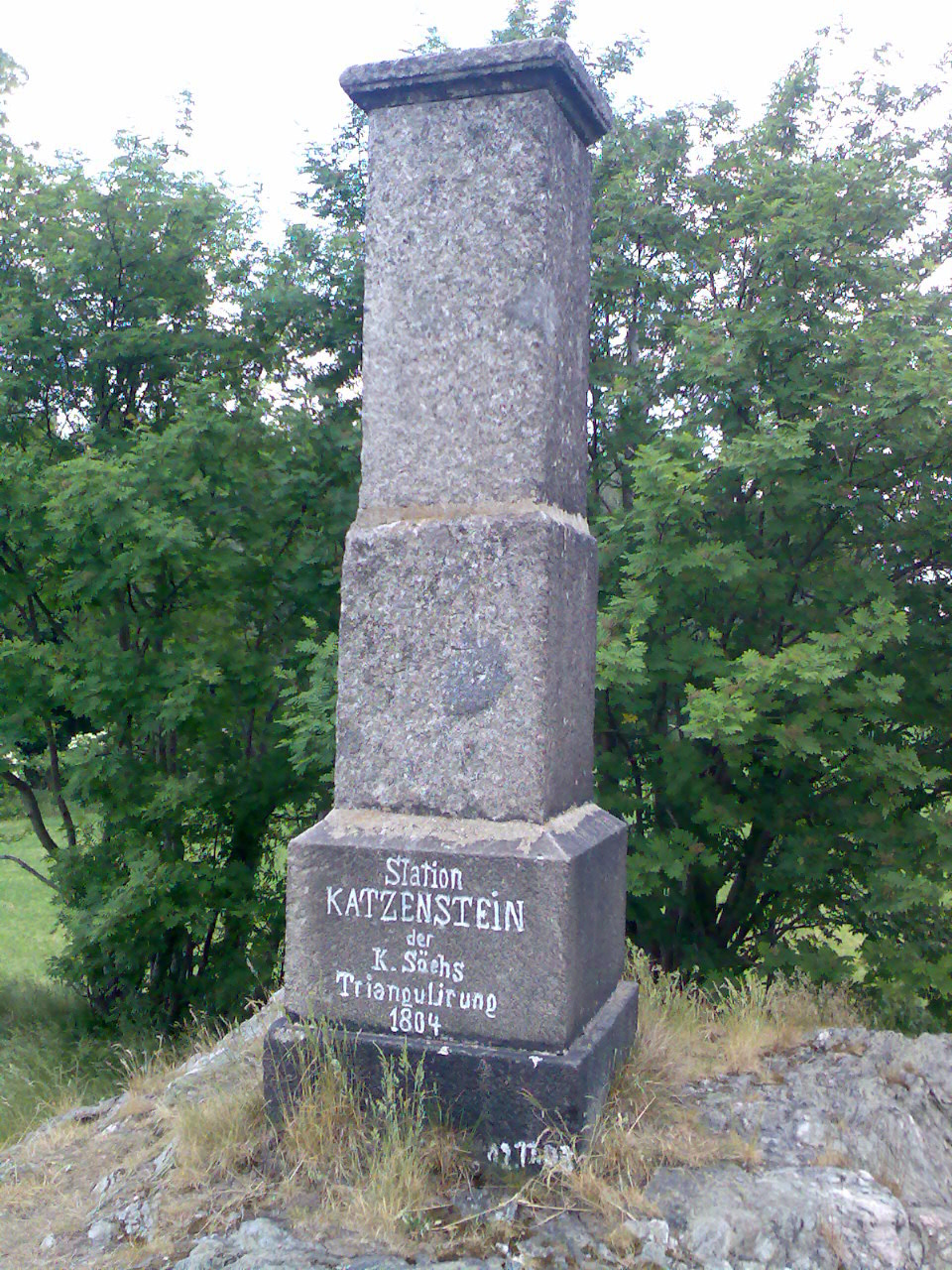
- Triangulation point on the Katzenstein mountain

Highest point
- Elevation: 627 m (2,057 ft)

Geography
- Location: Saxony, Germany

The Katzenstein is a 627-metre-high (2,057 ft) mountain in Saxony, southeastern Germany. It is one of two mountains that share a name in the Ore Mountains that form the boundary between Germany and the Czech Republic.

At the summit of 627 metres stands a Royal Saxon triangulation stone that traces its origins back to the 15th century. It was reconstructed in 1864, although the stone is incorrectly painted with 1804.

The mountain was host to the Katzenstein transmitter, a very high frequency radio transmitter that was important to the GDR. Constructed in 1955, after broadcasting radio and television signals for almost 20 years it was dismantled in 1973.

== See also ==
- Iron Way
