= Baginskas =

- Lithuanian surname
- m.: Baginskas
- f.: (unmarried): Baginskaitė
- f.: (married): Baginskienė
- Related names: Baginski

Baginskas is a Lithuanian surname. Notable people with the surname include:

- Camilla Baginskaite
- Gintautėlė Laimutė Baginskienė
