= Katzman =

Katzman is a surname. Notable people with the surname include:

- Abe Katzman (1868–1940), American violinist and klezmer recording artist
- Hayim Katsman (1991–2023), Israeli academic and peace activist
- Henry Katzman (1912–2001), American composer and musician
- John Katzman (born 1959), education entrepreneur
- Julie Katzman (born 1961), American financier
- Leonard Katzman (1927–1996), American film and television screenwriter, producer and director
- Mark Katzman (born 1951), American writer
- Sam Katzman (1901–1973), American film producer
- Terry Katzman (1955–2019), American producer, sound engineer, archivist, and record-store owner
- Theo Katzman (born 1986), American singer-songwriter

== See also ==
- Katzmann
- Katz (name)
