= Katzmann =

Katzmann is a German surname. Notable people with the surname include:

- Anna Katzmann, Australian barrister and judge
- Frederick G. Katzmann (1875–1953), American attorney and politician
- Fritz Katzmann (1906–1957), high-ranking SS officer, known for authoring the Katzmann Report
- Gary Katzmann (born 1953), American judge
- Mary Jane Katzmann (1828–1890), Canadian poet and editor
- Nosie Katzmann (born 1959), German music producer and writer
- Robert Katzmann (1953–2021), American judge

== See also ==
- Katzman
