= Katznelson =

Katznelson is a Jewish Ashkenazi surname, a derivative of Katzenellenbogen, both being derived from the name of the former German County of Katzenelnbogen. Variant spellings of the surname derived from the toponym like Katzenelenbogen and Katznelbogen have led to further variations like Katzeneleson, Kazenelson, Kaznelson, by addition of -son, 'son'.

Katznelson and variants may refer to:

== Katznelson ==
- Berl Katznelson, a Labor Zionism philosopher
- Avraham Katznelson (Avraham Nissan), Zionist political figure, a signatory of the Israeli declaration of independence.
- Yitzhak Katznelson, an Israeli mathematician
- Shulamit Katznelson, Israeli educator and ulpan founder
- Shmuel Tamir (born Katznelson), a member of the Israeli Knesset, son of Bat-Sheva Katznelson
- Ira Katznelson, an American political scientist and historian
- Zachary Philip Katznelson, British lawyer

== Katzenelson ==
- Itzhak Katzenelson, Jewish teacher, poet, and dramatist

== Katsnelson ==
- Mikhail Katsnelson, Russian-Dutch physicist

== Other variants ==
- Dora Kacnelson
- Kacnel'son
- Kacenel'son
