= Mark Katzman =

American writer and musician (born 1951)

- Born: 1951 (age 74–75); St. Louis, Missouri, U.S.
- Writing career
- Period: 1990–present
- Website: markkatzman.net

Mark Katzman (born 1951) is an American writer and musician.

== Biography ==
Katzman was born in St. Louis, Missouri, in 1951, to Meyer and Henrietta Katzman and raised in Kansas City. He has one sibling, Salli Katz.

His interest in writing manifested itself after, he says, a "transformational experience" when he was twenty-two. He had never written creatively before that time. Katzman shared a seventeen-year-long friendship with William Bronk, which shaped his literary career in many ways as well. Their correspondence resides at Butler Library, Columbia University.

Katzman worked at Lamont Library at Harvard University for five years. Lamont houses the Woodberry Poetry Room, a major repository of poetry and audio archives. The Curator at the time, Stratis Haviaras, was pivotal in guiding Katzman’s future literary pursuits.

He lives in Athens, Georgia.

== Works ==
=== Novels ===
- M7, a speculative, literary novel (Spaceboy Books, 2024). A feature article on Katzman appeared in Flagpole magazine, Athens, Georgia, May 22, 2024.
- Home, (Readers Magnet, 2022).
- Play Date, (Civil Coping Mechanisms, 2015).
- I Russian Bride (indie publication) came out in June 2011.

The first five letters of the book were also featured in the online magazine bhag.net. The work has additionally been expressed and expanded upon through two new media publication styles: on YouTube on April 1, 2010 via occasional video installments, and beginning in Summer 2010, through continuous Twitter updates (@IRussianBride) with new content to extend the story. On YouTube the emails that comprise the book are read as voice-over to the creative visuals which together tell the story of Russian woman Ivana's love for an American man.

=== Plays ===
In 2005, Katzman was a member of New York Artists Unlimited. He was part of a select group of playwrights chosen to develop their work. A staged reading of his play, Crisscross, was performed there in 2006. Katzman directed four performances of Crisscross in July, 2012, at the Metropolitan Ensemble Theater as part of the Kansas City Fringe Festival.

Katzman's full-length play, Henny & Harry, won the 2012 Plays-In-Progress Workshop award from Rockhurst College in Kansas City, Mo., with a staged reading held on October 12, 2012. The play was a finalist in both the Jewish Play Festival and the Bay Area Playwright's Festival competitions in 2014. His one-act, Pretty Button, had a staged reading at the Metropolitan Ensemble Theatre on October 7, 2013.

=== Talk on William Bronk ===
On April 13–14, 2013, Katzman gave a talk at a two-day symposium on the work of William Bronk at New York University and Columbia University called William Bronk in New York: A Symposium on the Life and Work of William Bronk. His talk, "Desire and Denial: The William Bronk - Mark Katzman Correspondence," encompasses the seventeen year friendship between himself and Bronk, culminating with the interview - "At Home in the Unknown"- that is considered integral to Bronk studies. The talk is included in a book of the symposium proceedings, William Bronk in the Twenty-First Century: New Assessments, by Edward Foster and Burt Kimmelman (Talisman Press, 2013).

=== Artist books ===
In 1990, Katzman created INoN (Nexus Press, 1990) with artist Susan Kress, and another artist's book, Along the Way (Pequeño Press, Guanajuato, Mexico, 1990). They have been displayed in various museum exhibits. Copy number 4 of INoN is in the permanent collections of the Museum of Modern Art.

=== Interviews ===
Katzman has interviewed notable people including Stanley Kunitz, William Bronk, Timothy Leary, and John Gurche. He initiated the first Oral Histories for The Explorer's Club in New York City. Three of his interviews (those with Robyn Hitchcock, William Orbit, and Mark Eitzel) have appeared in the magazine, Mondo 2000. Additionally, his interviews with Michael Gosney (producer of the Digital Be-In) and R.U. Sirius appeared in the magazine, Internet Underground.
