= Orthoscopy =

Orthoscopy used in optics and vision for the condition of normal, distortion-free view, from "ortho", straight, right, correct, and "scope", seeing.

Abbe in 1880 designed an orthoscopic eyepiece for stereoscopic microscopes which minimized distortion. The term was also used in stereoscopy by Heine for the condition when the perceived depth in a stereogram is the same as that in the actual view of the scene. Such a perceptual report by an observer must be distinguished from what Moritz von Rohr called homeomorphic view, in which the depth in a stereoscopic 3D reconstruction is merely geometrically true, see Stereoscopic Depth Rendition. The difference between homeomorphic and orthoscopic is typical of the divide in psychophysics between the world of physical stimuli and the world of subjects' percepts, see Gustav Fechner.
