= Benno Baginsky =

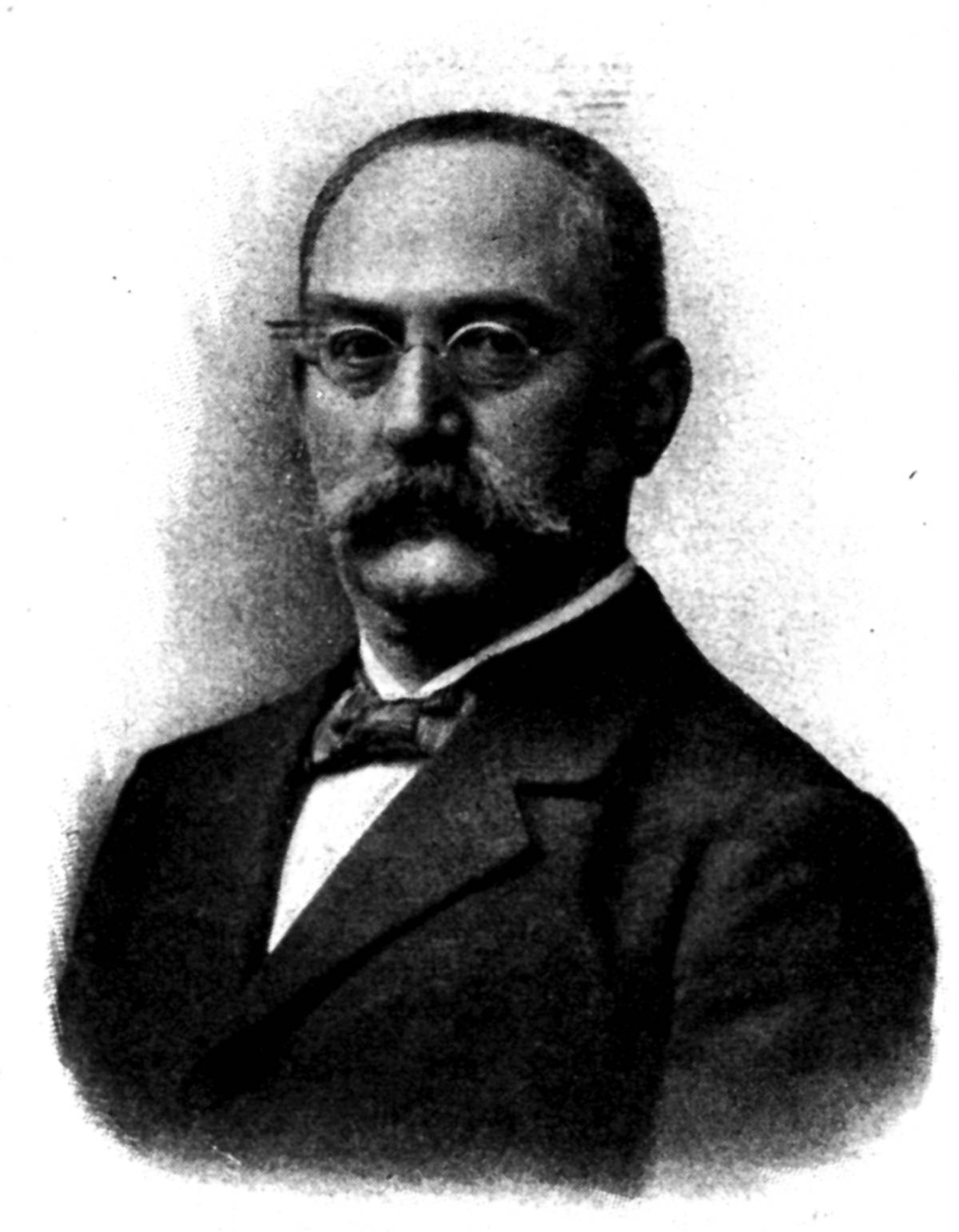
Benno Baginsky (1848–1919)

Benno Baginsky (24 May 1848 in Ratibor – 1919) was a German physician specializing in the field of otorhinolaryngology. He was a younger brother to pediatrician Adolf Aron Baginsky (1843–1918).

He studied medicine in Berlin, obtaining his doctorate in 1870. Following service as a physician in the Franco-Prussian War, he began practicing medicine and soon found himself specializing in diseases of the ear, nose and larynx. In 1884 he became a privat-docent of otology, rhinology and laryngology at the University of Berlin, and in 1897 received the title of professor. Among his assistants at Berlin was fellow otorhinolaryngologist Jacob Katzenstein (1864–1921).

== Publications ==
He was the author of numerous articles in various scientific journals — Archiv für Mikroskopische Anatomie, Archiv für Physiologie, Archiv für Anatomie und Physiologie, Archiv für Pathologie und Anatomie, Deutsche Medizinische Wochenschrift, Archiv für Ohrenheilkunde and Revue Neurologique. He also made contributions to Albert Eulenburg's Real-Encyclopädie der gesammter Heilkunde. The following are a few of his principal works:

- Die Rhinoskopischen Untersuchungs- und Operationsmethoden, 1879 - Rhinoscopic investigations and surgical methods.
- Zur Physiologie der Gehörschnecke, 1883 - The physiology of the cochlea.
- Über den Ursprung und den centralen Verlauf des Nervus acusticus des Kaninchens, 1888 - Origin and course of the acoustic nerve in rabbits.
