= Katzenstein (Habichtswald) =

Hill in Germany

- Location within Hesse Location within Germany

Highest point
- Elevation: 476.6 m (1,564 ft)
- Coordinates: 51.35°N 9.37°E

Geography
- Location: Hesse, Germany

Katzenstein is a hill of Hesse, Germany.
