= Maureen Baginski =

American intelligence operative

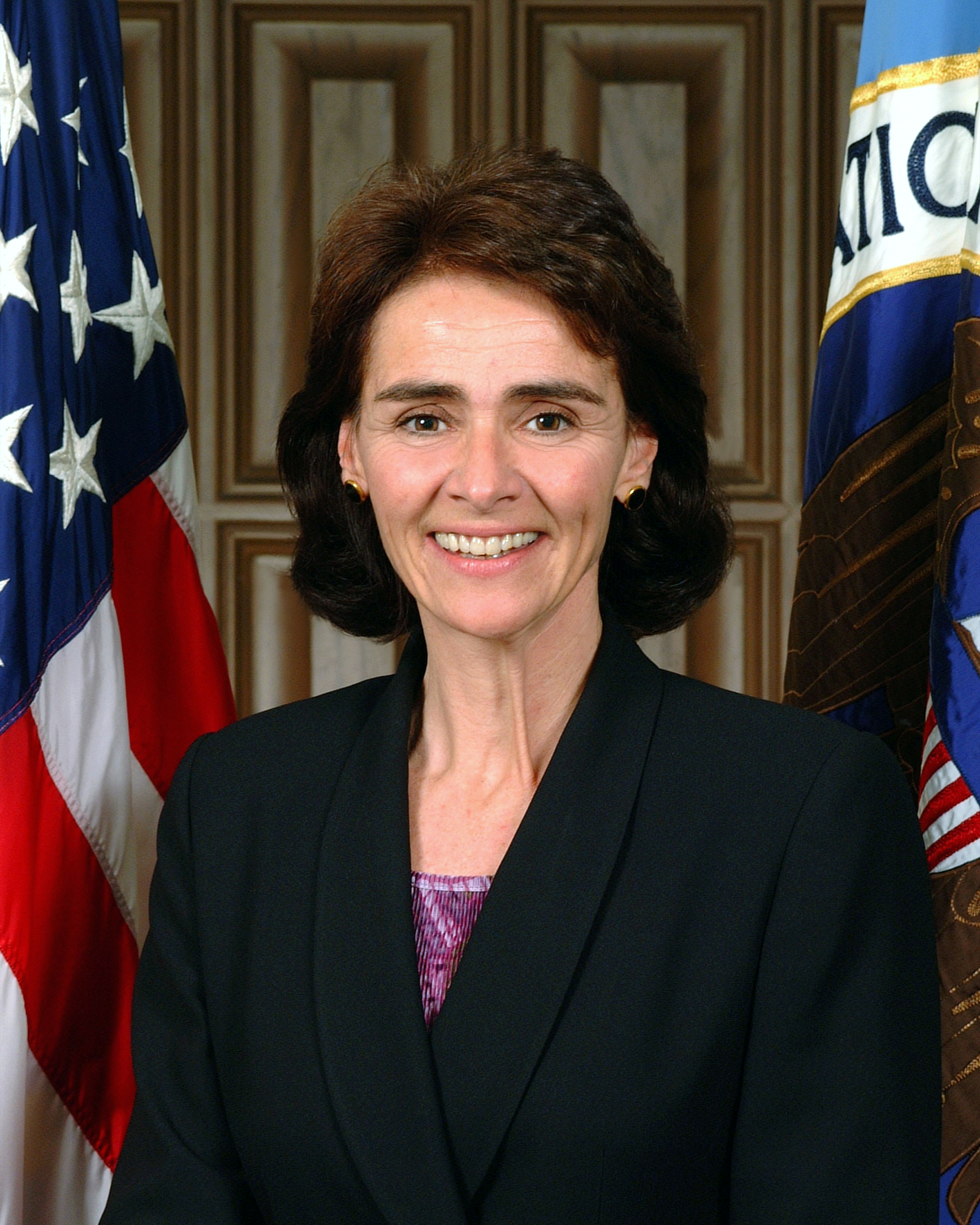
Maureen Baginski

Maureen A. Baginski is a former Signals Intelligence (SIGINT) director at the National Security Agency (NSA), and executive assistant director of intelligence at the Federal Bureau of Investigation (FBI).

== Early life and education ==
Before beginning her intelligence career, Baginski graduated with a BA and MA in Slavic languages and linguistics from the University of Albany, where she also received an honorary Doctorate of Humane Letters in 2005 for her service to the nation.

== Public sector career ==
Baginski began her career in intelligence in 1979 as a Russian language instructor at the NSA during the Cold War. She held various positions over her nearly quarter-century at the NSA, including lead analyst for the Soviet Union, assistant deputy director of technology and systems, chief officer of the director, executive assistant to the director of NSA/Central Security Service, senior operations officer in the National Security Operations Center, and SIGINT director, NSA's third highest position. Baginski was the SIGINT director on September 11, 2001, and was critical to the NSA's response after the terrorist attacks while also directing the Extended SIGINT Enterprise in order to acquire, produce, and disseminate foreign SIGINT to a variety of government and military customers.

In the documentary film “A Good American”, then-senior NSA executive Thomas Drake quotes Baginski as saying “9/11 is a gift to NSA. We’re gonna get all the money we need and then some,” in the immediate aftermath of 9/11. Retired NSA Analyst Bill Binney - the star of the film - describes Baginski’s reaction as “sickening.”

In 2003, Baginski left her position at the NSA to become the executive assistant director of Intelligence at the FBI. As the executive assistant director of Intelligence at the FBI between 2003-2005, Baginski successfully led the bureau's first-ever intelligence program. She was in charge of adapting the FBI's intelligence capabilities with information technologies, and created an intelligence-sharing platform that helped identify and stop terror plots. As the head of intelligence at the FBI, Baginski helped develop an intelligence career service so that intelligence professionals would be able to advance in their careers at the FBI. Many high-ranking government officials, including President George W. Bush and FBI Director Mueller, acknowledged and applauded Baginski's significant changes at the FBI which improved its capabilities to safeguard the United States of America. Upon her retirement from the FBI, Director Mueller asked Baginski to remain as a senior advisor to the FBI, a position which she accepted.

== Private sector career ==
Since retiring from the FBI, Baginski has held multiple positions within the private sector. She has been a board member at BearingPoint Inc., Argon ST, and SI International Inc. Baginski has also been President of National Security Systems at SPARTA Inc., chief executive officer at National Security Partners LLC, and Chairwoman Emeriti of AFCEA.

== Awards ==
Throughout and after her career in the public sector, Baginski received several awards, including two Presidential Rank Awards, two Director of Central Intelligence National Achievement Medals, the Director of Military Intelligence’s Leadership Award, NSA’s Exceptional Civilian Service Award, and the FBI Intelligence Analysts Association Award.
