= Adolf Aron Baginsky =

German pediatrician

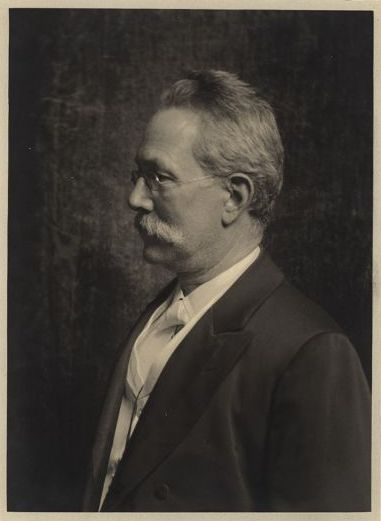
Adolf Aron Baginsky

Adolf Aron Baginsky (May 22, 1843 – 15 May 1918) was a German professor of diseases of children at Berlin University. He was an older brother to otorhinolaryngologist Benno Baginsky (1848-1919).

== Biography ==
Baginsky was born in Ratibor (Racibórz), Prussian Silesia. At the completion of his high-school education at the gymnasium of his native town (1861), he studied medicine in Berlin and Vienna. He was graduated from Berlin University in 1866, and in the same year accepted the position of private assistant to Ludwig Traube at the cholera hospital in Berlin; and in 1868 moved to Seehausen, near Magdeburg, where he began his career as a practising physician. Two years later, however, he accepted the post of chief physician in a military hospital in Nordhausen, and at the close of the Franco-Prussian War returned to Berlin, where he practised medicine, at the same time pursuing anew the studies which had been interrupted under the pressure of practical work in different hospitals. In 1881 Baginsky was appointed Privatdozent at the University of Berlin; and in 1892 promoted to an associate professorship at that institution.

Baginsky devoted himself to the treatment of children's diseases. He was director of the Kaiser und Kaiserin Friedrich Kinderkrankenhaus, which he founded in Berlin with the assistance of Rudolf Virchow in 1890. The Berlin Poliklinik für Kinderkrankheiten was also established in the metropolis through his efforts. He was also the founder and editor-in-chief of the Archiv für Kinderheilkunde in 1880, in collaboration with Monti and Herz in Stuttgart. His services were recognized by the Prussian and foreign governments, and he received many orders and decorations. His numerous contributions to the science of medicine include treatises on school-hygiene, "Handbuch der Schulhygiene", Stuttgart, 1883; and on the cure of children's diseases, "Lehrbuch der Kinderkrankheiten," Berlin, 1892 (these latter have been translated into several languages); "Praktische Beiträge zur Kinderheilkunde," Tübingen, 1880–84. All of these works have gone through several editions. Among his other writings, besides a great number of papers scattered through several medical journals, may be mentioned: "Pflege des Gesunden und Kranken Kindes" (The care of healthy and sick children), Stuttgart, 1885; "Das Leben des Weibes" (The life of women), ib. 1885; "Kost- und Haltekinderpflege in Berlin," Brunswick, 1886, etc.

Baginsky was a member of the several associations and committees formed in Berlin for the purpose of checking antisemitism in Germany. He is also the author of an essay entitled, "Die Hygienische Bedeutung der Mosäischen Gesetzgebung," in which he comes forward as a stanch defender and enthusiastic admirer of the hygienic laws of Moses. He took active part in the social and religious life of the Jewish community in Berlin, and was one of the opponents of a movement to hold Sunday services in the synagogues of that city. Baginsky was a member of the Imperial Leopoldina-Carolina Academy; commander of the Spanish Order Isabella the Catholic; and was decorated with the Prussian Order of the Red Eagle, fourth class. He died in Berlin.

== Sources ==
- J. Pagel, Biographisches Lexikon Hervorragender Aerzte des XIX. Jahrhunderts;
- Richard Wrede, Das Geistige Berlin, vol. iii. s.v.;
- Wernich and Hirsch, Bibliographisches Lexicon Hervorragender Aerzte aller Zeiten und Völker;
- Archives of Palestine, x., New York, 1893;
- Brockhaus, Konversations-Lexikon, 14th ed.;
- Meyer, Konversations-Lexikon, 5th ed.;
