= Dr. Cyrus and Myrtle Katzen Cancer Research Center =

The Dr. Cyrus & Myrtle Katzen Cancer Research Center
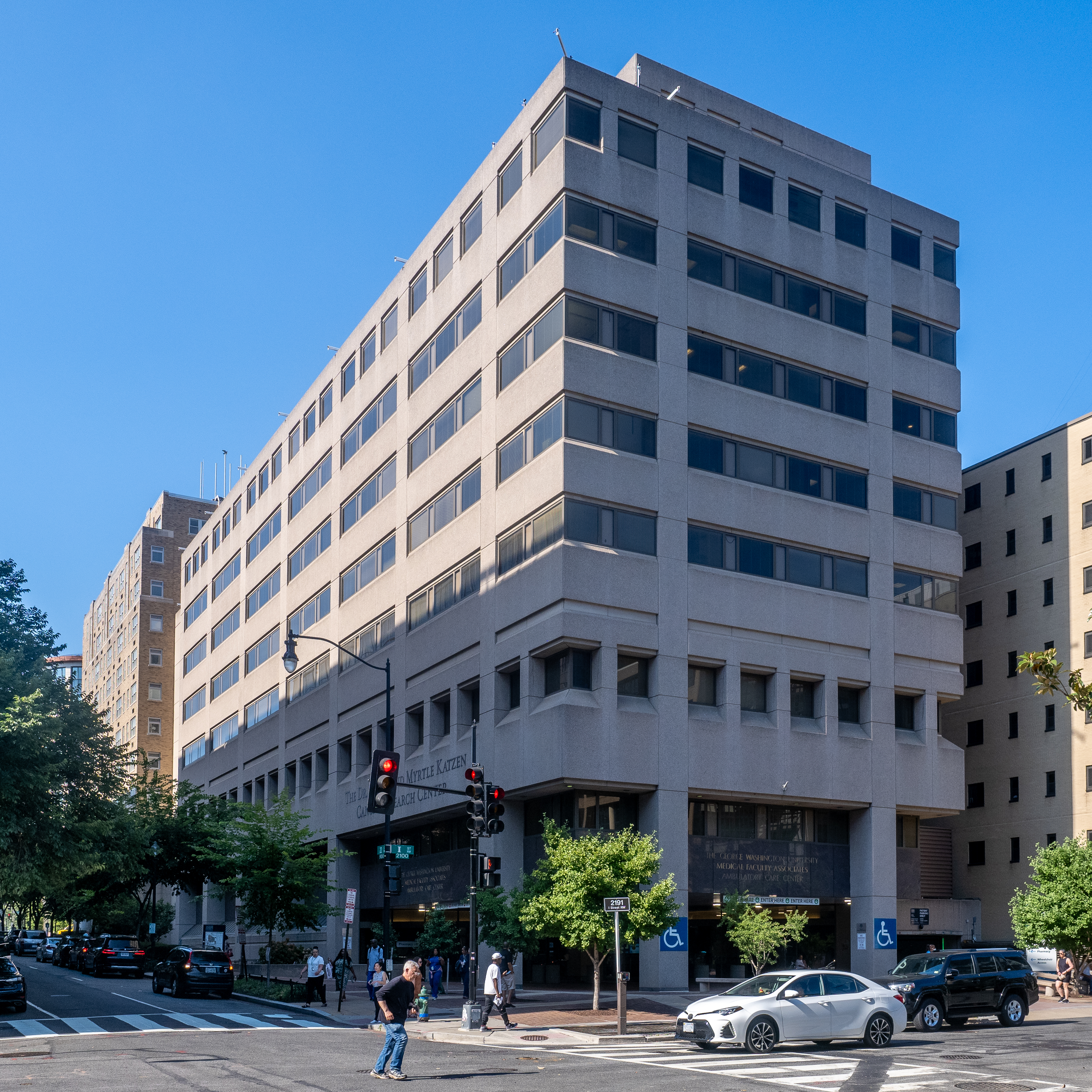
- (2024)
- Abbreviation: Katzen
- Formation: 2009
- Type: Research Institute
- Headquarters: 2150 Pennsylvania Avenue
- Location: Washington, D.C, United States
- Director: Robert S. Siegel, M.D.

== About ==
The Dr. Cyrus & Myrtle Katzen Cancer Research Center is a research unit of the George Washington University School of Medicine and Health Sciences. The center was started through a $10 million donation from Dr. Cyrus and Myrtle Katzen. The current director is Robert S. Siegel, M.D.

The center awarded over $350,000 in grants to GW researchers during the 2011 academic year. The center is also the recipient of many external grants from government agencies and foundations.
