= Gerard Loughlin =

English Catholic theologian

- Born: Gerard Patrick Loughlin

Academic background
- Education: University of Wales, Lampeter; Trinity College, Cambridge
- Thesis: Mirroring God's World: A Critique of John Hick's Speculative Theology (1987)
- Doctoral advisors: John Robinson, Don Cupitt, Nicholas Lash, Brian Hebblethwaite

Academic work
- Discipline: Theology; religious studies
- Institutions: University of Newcastle; University of Durham

Gerard Patrick Loughlin is an English Roman Catholic theologian and religious scholar. He is Professor of Theology and Religion at the University of Durham, England. He is the author of Telling God's Story: Bible Church and Narrative Theology (1996) and Alien Sex: The Body and Desire in Cinema and Theology (2004).

== Biography ==
A gay Roman Catholic, some of Loughlin's work is in the sub-discipline of queer theology. He is the coeditor (with Jon Davies) of Sex These Days: Essays on Theology, Sexuality and Society (Continuum 1997) and editor of Queer Theology: Rethinking the Western Body (Blackwell, 2007). He serves on the editorial board of Literature and Theology (Oxford University Press) and is co-editor (with Elizabeth Stuart and Kent Brintnall) of Theology and Sexuality (Taylor&Francis).

His master's thesis is titled The Novels of Modernism: The Embodiment of Roman Catholic Modernism in the Literature of Religious Turmoil and Faith at the Turn of the Century, c. 1888–1914. His doctoral thesis, which he wrote under the supervision of John Robinson, is titled Mirroring God's World: A Critique of John Hick's Speculative Theology.

== Published works ==
- Telling God's Story: Bible, Church and Narrative Theology (Cambridge: Cambridge University Press, 1996) ISBN 9780758218896
- (ed. with Jon Davies) Sex These Days: Essays on Theology, Sexuality and Society (Sheffield: Sheffield Academic Press, 1997) ISBN 9781850758044
- Alien Sex: The Body and Desire in Cinema and Theology (Oxford: Blackwell, 2004) ISBN 9780631211808
- (ed.) Queer Theology: Rethinking the Western Body (Oxford: Blackwell, 2007) ISBN 9780631216087

== See also ==
- Postliberal theology
- Radical orthodoxy
