= Katzenstein (Pobershau) =

Coordinates: 50°37′56″N 13°14′15″E

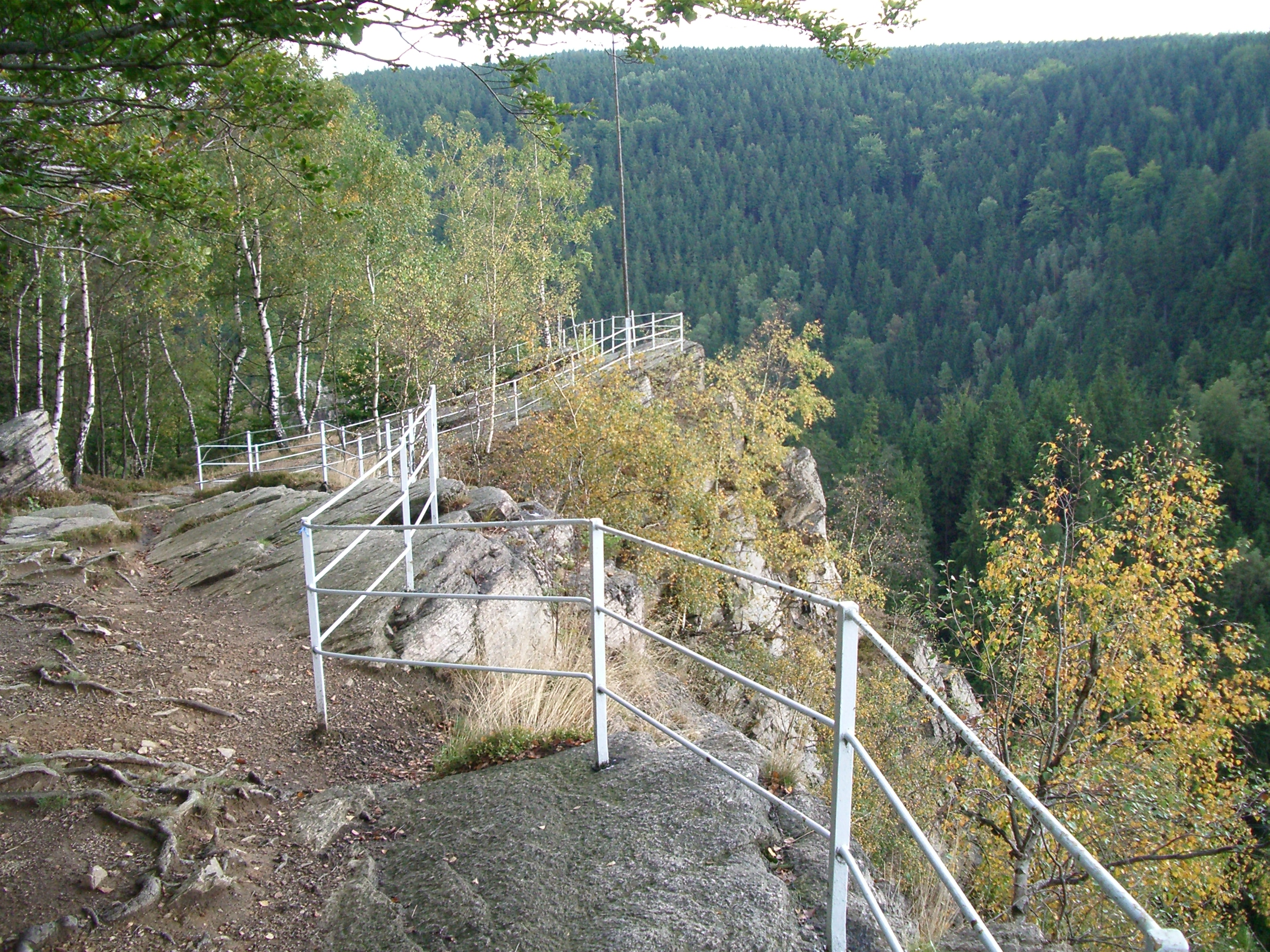

Highest point
- Elevation: 706 m (2,316 ft)

Geography
- Location: Saxony, Germany

The Katzenstein is a mountain in Saxony, southeastern Germany.

== View ==
From the plateau there are extensive views to the east and, at its foot lies the Schwarzwassertal view. To the east is the elongated, arch-shaped rock formation known as the Ringmauer. To the southeast is the Rabenberg with the steep summit of the Liebenstein. This spot was once the site of Liebenstein Castle, a 12th-century castle whose tower ruins were still visible in the 18th century.
