= Despre tine =

2002 single by O-Zone

- Cover for the 2004 re-release

Single by O-Zone

from the album Number 1 (reissue) and DiscO-Zone
- Language: Romanian
- Released: c. December 2002 (Note: Although the exact release date of "Despre tine" is unclear, the song opened on the Romanian Top 100 chart in December 2002, indicating that it had received radio airplay by that time.)
- Recorded: September 2002
- Studio: MOF Records studio (Bucharest, Romania)
- Genre: Dance-pop
- Length: 3:49
- Label: Media Services
- Songwriter: Dan Balan
- Producer: Balan

O-Zone singles chronology
"Numai tu" (2002)	"Despre tine" (2002)	"Dragostea din tei" (2003)

Music video
- "Despre tine" on YouTube

"Despre tine" (Note: Romanian pronunciation: [ˈdespre ˈtine].) (Romanian for 'About You') is a song recorded by the Moldovan Eurodance group O-Zone, released as a single by Media Services in Romania around December 2002. Written and produced by the band's founder Dan Balan, it was included on a reissue of their second studio album Number 1 (2002) and later on their third studio album DiscO-Zone (2003). Work on "Despre tine" spanned three weeks in September 2002, and its recording took place at the MOF Records studio with the assistance of Bogdan Popoiag. Following the international success of O-Zone's 2003 single "Dragostea din tei", "Despre tine" was re-released in select European markets in August 2004. Musically, it is a dance-pop song performed in Romanian.

At the MTV Romania Music Awards 2003, "Despre tine" won Best Song and Best Dance. It also received a nomination for Best Dance-Pop Song at the Radio România Actualități Awards the same year. Commercially, a music critic considered the track successful, though on a smaller scale than "Dragostea din tei". It topped the Romanian Top 100 in 2003 and reached number one in Norway in 2004, while also charting within the top 10 in Austria, Wallonia, Denmark, France, Germany, Italy, Spain, Sweden, and Switzerland. The song was certified double gold in Romania and gold in France. A music video to promote "Despre tine" was released in 2004 and portrays O-Zone performing the song at a club among a dancing crowd. The group also performed the song live on television, including on Hit Machine in France and Top of the Pops in Germany.

== Background and release ==
O-Zone was a Moldovan group formed in 1999 by Dan Balan. The original lineup included Balan and Petru Jelihovschi, both of whom had previously performed in the gothic and doom metal band Inferialis during the 1990s. Seeking a more commercially viable sound, the duo released O-Zone's debut studio album Dar, unde ești... in 1999. The album found success in Moldova, but Jelihovschi subsequently departed the project to pursue a career in television. Balan auditioned two new members—Radu Sîrbu and Arsenie Todiraș—and, in 2002, relocated the group to neighboring Romania in search of a larger music market. The absence of a language barrier, as Romanian is spoken in both countries, and their sense of unity from their shared history facilitated this move.

The label Media Services issued "Despre tine" as a single in Romania around December 2002. It was subsequently included on a same-year reissue of O-Zone's second studio album, Number 1 (2002). A remix of the song, subtitled "Unu' in the Mix", appeared on the Romanian edition of the group's third studio album, DiscO-Zone (2003), while the original version was included on the album's 2004 and 2005 international releases.

Following the widespread success of O-Zone's 2003 single "Dragostea din tei", "Despre tine" began receiving international radio airplay as early as July 2004. On Latvian radio stations, the track was reportedly broadcast under the title "Mă înec în ochii tăi" (Romanian for 'I am drowning in your eyes')—a phrase derived from its refrain. The single was re-released in late August 2004 across select European markets, with physical editions issued in countries including France, Germany, Italy, the Netherlands, and Sweden. The cover artwork used for most versions was designed by French illustrator Gil Formosa.

== Recording and composition ==
"Despre tine" was written, composed, and produced by Balan. Recording took place at the MOF Records studio with the assistance of Bogdan Popoiag, who also handled mixing and mastering. Work on the track spanned three weeks in September 2002, according to Popoiag, who later claimed he had made substantial contributions to the track's composition that remained uncredited.

Musically, "Despre tine" is a dance-pop song performed in Romanian. Andrei Vulpescu of Curentul likened it to the group's "Dragostea din tei", and identified the lyric "Nu-mi răspunzi la SMS" (transl. You don't answer my SMS) as a well-known line from the song among the Romanian public. Libertatea's Petre Dobrescu observed that this lyric coincided with the rising popularity of mobile phones in Romania at the time.

== Reception ==
"Despre tine" debuted at number 92 on the Romanian Top 100 in December 2002, before reaching the top position in February 2003, where it remained for three consecutive weeks. The single was certified double gold in Romania later that year. At the MTV Romania Music Awards 2003, "Despre tine" won Best Song and Best Dance. It also received a nomination for Best Dance-Pop Song at the Radio România Actualități Awards the same year.

Following the song's international release in 2004, it entered several European charts. Gardianul opined that the overseas success of "Despre tine" dispelled O-Zone's status as one-hit wonders, a label attributed to them by some publications. Vulpescu considered the song's commercial impact as less substantial than "Dragostea din tei". In July 2004, "Despre tine" peaked at number eight in Italy; it reached number four in Denmark and number one in Norway in August of the same year. The single spent ten consecutive weeks in Denmark's top 10, and 11 in Norway, including eight consecutive ones at number one. In the latter country, it became O-Zone's second chart-topping single, replacing "Dragostea din tei" at the summit.

Throughout September 2004, "Despre tine" reached number two in France, remaining in the top 10 for 11 consecutive weeks, as well as number nine in Wallonia and number four in Spain. It earned a gold certification from the French Syndicat national de l'édition phonographique (SNEP) for sales of 250,000 copies. In October and November, "Despre tine" also peaked at number four on Billboard's European Hot 100 Singles chart, number seven in Sweden, and entered the top 10 in all DACH countries (Germany, Austria, and Switzerland).

== Promotion ==
An accompanying music video for "Despre tine" was released in 2004 at the latest. It starts with Sîrbu, Todiraș, and Balan materializing one by one onto a dance floor, as seated spectators watch from the sidelines. Each band member is dressed in a black shirt paired with a white blazer and trousers. A subsequent close-up shows Balan's trousers transforming into black fabric embellished with red stars, while a pair of sunglasses appears on his face.

The scene then cuts to a newspaper advertising O-Zone's comeback. The group reappears on the same dance floor, with Balan sporting the aforementioned outfit, and Sîrbu and Todiraș wearing colorful, patterned outfits as they perform the song against shifting lights and a multicolored disco ball. The bystanders from earlier join the trio and dance alongside them. Additional shots depict the O-Zone members separately singing into a microphone or―following another costume change―playing electric guitars and drums together. The video concludes with the crowd looking downward toward the camera, pointing toward it.

To promote the song, O-Zone performed "Despre tine" at televised events. They appeared on the French program Hit Machine on 4 September 2004, the German Bravo Super Show on 1 October 2004, and Top of the Pops in the same country also that year. Before disbanding in 2005, O-Zone gave a performance of "Despre tine" at the Golden Stag Festival in Romania in September of that year.

== Track listings ==
- Dutch CD single
1. "Despre tine" (Original Album Version) – 3:49
2. "Despre tine" (Original Italian Version) – 3:33
- European CD single 1
1. "Despre tine" – 3:47
2. "Despre tine" (Prezioso & Marvin Radio Edit) – 3:32
- European 12-inch single
1. "Despre tine" (Beach Version Extended Remix) – 5:28
2. "Despre tine" (Original Album Version) – 3:49
3. "Despre tine" (Prezioso & Marvin Extended Remix) – 5:40
4. "Despre tine" (Original Paulsander Mix) – 3:49
- French CD single 1
1. "Despre tine" (Original Album Version) – 3:49
2. "Despre tine" (Original Italian Version) – 3:33
3. "Despre tine" (Prezioso & Marvin Radio Edit) – 3:36
4. "Dragostea din tei" (Original Romanian Version) – 3:33
- French CD single 2
1. "Despre tine" (Original Album Version) – 3:49
2. "Despre tine" (Original Italian Version) – 3:33
3. "Despre tine" (Prezioso & Marvin Radio Edit) – 3:36
4. "Despre tine" (Beach Extended Version) – 5:28
5. "Despre tine" (Original Paulsander Mix) – 3:49
- French 12-inch single
1. "Despre tine" (Prezioso & Marvin Extended Remix) – 5:40
2. "Despre tine" (Original Italian Version) – 3:33
3. "Despre tine" (Original Album Version) – 3:49
4. "Despre tine" (Beach Extended Version) – 5:28
- German CD single
1. "Despre tine" (Original Album Version) – 3:47
2. "Dragostea din tei" (Original Romanian Version) – 3:33
3. "Despre tine" (Prezioso & Marvin Radio Edit) – 3:32
4. "Despre tine" (Beach Extended Version) – 5:28
5. "Despre tine" (Music video) – 3:53
- German mini CD
1. "Despre tine" – 3:47
2. "Dragostea din tei" (DJ Ross Extended Remix) – 6:22
- Italian CD single
1. "Despre tine" (Original Italian Version) – 3:33
2. "Despre tine" (Original Album Version) – 3:49
3. "Despre tine" (Prezioso & Marvin Radio Edit) – 3:36
4. "Despre tine" (Prezioso & Marvin Extended Remix) – 5:40
5. "Despre tine" (Beach Extended Version) – 5:28
6. "Despre tine" (Original Paulsander Mix) – 3:49
- Italian 12-inch single
1. "Despre tine" (Prezioso & Marvin Extended Remix) – 5:40
2. "Despre tine" (Prezioso & Marvin Radio Edit) – 3:36
3. "Despre tine" (Original Italian Version) – 3:33
4. "Despre tine" (Beach Extended Version) – 5:28
- Spanish CD single
1. "Despre tine" (Original Album Version) – 3:49
2. "Despre tine" (Xtm Version) – 3:40
3. "Despre tine" (Prezioso & Marvin Extended Remix) – 5:37
4. "Despre tine" (Original Italian Version) – 3:32
5. "Despre tine" (Original Haiduc Version) – 3:34
6. "Despre tine" (Original Paulsander Mix) – 3:49
7. "Despre tine" (Beach Extended Version) – 5:30
8. "Despre tine" (Prezioso & Marvin Radio Edit) – 3:33
9. "Despre tine" (Beach Radio Version) – 3:51
- Swedish CD single
1. "Despre tine" (Original Italian Version) – 3:33
2. "Despre tine" (Prezioso & Marvin Radio Edit) – 3:36
3. "Despre tine" (Original Paulsander Mix) – 3:49
4. "Despre tine" (Prezioso & Marvin Extended Remix) – 5:40
5. "Despre tine" (Original Haiduc Version) – 3:36
- Other official versions
1. "Despre tine" (Unu' in the Mix) – 7:37

== Charts ==
=== Weekly charts ===
2003–2004 weekly chart performance for "Despre tine"
Chart (2003–2004)	Peak position
Austria (Ö3 Austria Top 40)	4
Belgium (Ultratop 50 Flanders)	35
Belgium (Ultratop 40 Wallonia)	9
CIS Airplay (TopHit)	33
Czech Republic (IFPI)	29
Denmark (Tracklisten)	4
Europe (European Hot 100 Singles)	4
Finland (Suomen virallinen lista)	14
France (SNEP)	2
Germany (Media Control)	9
Hungary (Dance Top 40)	8
Italy (FIMI)	8
Netherlands (Single Top 100)	27
Norway (VG-lista)	1
Romania (Romanian Top 100)	1
Russia Airplay (TopHit)	17
Spain (PROMUSICAE)	4
Sweden (Hitlistan)	7
Switzerland (Schweizer Hitparade)	9
Ukraine Airplay (TopHit)	154

2011 weekly chart performance for "Despre tine"
Chart (2011)	Peak position
Ukraine Airplay (TopHit)	89

=== Year-end charts ===
2003 year-end chart performance for "Despre tine"
Chart (2003)	Position
Romania (Romanian Top 100)	13

2004 year-end chart performance for "Despre tine"
Chart (2004)	Position
Austria (Ö3 Austria Top 40)	66
Belgium (Ultratop 50 Wallonia)	63
CIS (TopHit)	72
France (SNEP)	27
Germany (Media Control)	74
Russia Airplay (TopHit)	42
Sweden (Hitlistan)	54
Switzerland (Schweizer Hitparade)	92

== Certifications ==
Certifications for "Despre tine"
Region	Certification	Certified units/sales
France (SNEP)	Gold	250,000^{*}
Romania	2× Gold	Unknown
^{*} Sales figures based on certification alone.

== Release history ==
Release dates for "Despre tine"
Region	Date	Format	Label	Ref.
Romania	c. December 2002	Radio airplay	Media Services	
Europe	2004	CD single	Time; Cat; Universal	
Europe	2004	12-inch single	Polydor	
France	2004	CD single	Universal	
France	2004	12-inch single	Universal	
Germany	2004	CD single	Time; Cat; Universal	
Germany	2004	Mini CD	Time; Cat; Universal	
Italy	2004	CD single	Sony	
Italy	2004	12-inch single	Time; Cat	
Netherlands	2004	CD single	BMG	
Spain	2004	CD single	Vale	
Sweden	2004	CD single	Cat; Time; Bonnier	
Belgium	13 September 2004	Digital download	Media Services	

== See also ==
- List of music released by Moldovan artists that has charted in major music markets
- List of number-one songs in Norway
- List of Romanian Top 100 number ones
