= Chica Bomb =

Single by Dan Balan
- Released: 14 October 2009
- Genre: Electro house
- Length: 3:11
- Label: Monarda; MediaPro; Spinnin
- Songwriters: Dan Balan, Corey "Chorus" Gibson
- Producer: Dan Balan

Dan Balan singles chronology
"Joanna (Shut Up!)" (2008)	"Chica Bomb" (2009)	"Justify Sex" (2010)

"Chica Bomb" is a song co-written and recorded by the Moldovan dance musician Dan Balan featuring uncredited vocals from American recording artist Katie DiCicco. It was released in October 2009.

== Reception ==
Nick Levine of Digital Spy gave the song a positive review stating:

It's by the guy behind T.I. and RiRi's favourite Eurodance smash, it's got a video that could accurately be subtitled "Jiggly Sweaty Boobs", and its title is a cringey slither of Spanglish that translates as "Young Girl Bomb". However, like a fondue made with Tesco Value mild cheddar, this isn't as cheesy as it should be. In fact, "Chica Bomb" is a sleek and reasonably sexy electro-house track with a nice bit of synthy bounce to it. It's not terribly original, of course, and the lyrics aren't worth cutting and pasting, but fair's fair; the hook doesn't miss explosive by much. The result? David Guetta may not have anything to worry about, but Britain's irked clubbers certainly do.

== Track listing ==
iTunes Digital download
No.	Title	Length
1.	"Chica Bomb" (UK Radio Edit)	3:11
2.	"Chica Bomb" (Extended Version)	4:20
3.	"Chica Bomb" (Chew Fu Hurt Locker Fix Extended Mix)	5:37
4.	"Chica Bomb" (Buzz Junkies Remix)	6:08
5.	"Chica Bomb" (Buzz Junkies Radio Edit)	3:38
6.	"Chica Bomb" (Vanotek Remix)	4:09

== Charts ==
=== Weekly charts ===
Weekly chart performance for "Chica Bomb"
Chart (2009–2010)	Peak position
Australia (ARIA)	100
Austria (Ö3 Austria Top 40)	64
CIS Airplay (TopHit)	1
Czech Republic Airplay (ČNS IFPI)	6
Denmark (Tracklisten)	36
Germany (GfK)	37
Hungary (Dance Top 40)	8
Netherlands (Tipparade)	21
Poland (Dance Top 50)	7
Poland (Polish Airplay TV)	5
Romania (UPFR)	37
Romania Airplay (Media Forest)	1
Romania TV Airplay (Media Forest)	1
Russia Airplay (TopHit)	1
Scottish Singles Sales (Official Charts)	32
Slovakia Airplay (ČNS IFPI)	35
UK Dance (Official Charts)	7
UK Singles (Official Charts)	44

=== Year-end charts ===
2009 year-end chart performance for "Chica Bomb"
Chart (2009)	Peak position
Romania (Media Forest)	26

2010 year-end chart performance for "Chica Bomb"
Chart (2010)	Peak position
CIS (TopHit)	2
Hungary (Dance Top 40)	19
Romania (Media Forest)	20
Russia Airplay (TopHit)	2

2011 year-end chart performance for "Chica Bomb"
Chart (2011)	Peak position
Romania (Media Forest)	90

== Release history ==
Release dates and formats for "Chica Bomb"
Region	Date	Format(s)	Version	Label(s)	Ref.
Romania	14 October 2009	N/A	Original	MediaPro	
United Kingdom	28 June 2010	Digital download; streaming	Remix EP	AATW	
Australia	1 August 2010	Radio airplay	Original	N/A	
Australia	20 August 2010	Digital download	Original	N/A	

== See also ==
- List of music released by Moldovan artists that has charted in major music markets
