= List of Media Forest most-broadcast songs of 2009 in Romania =

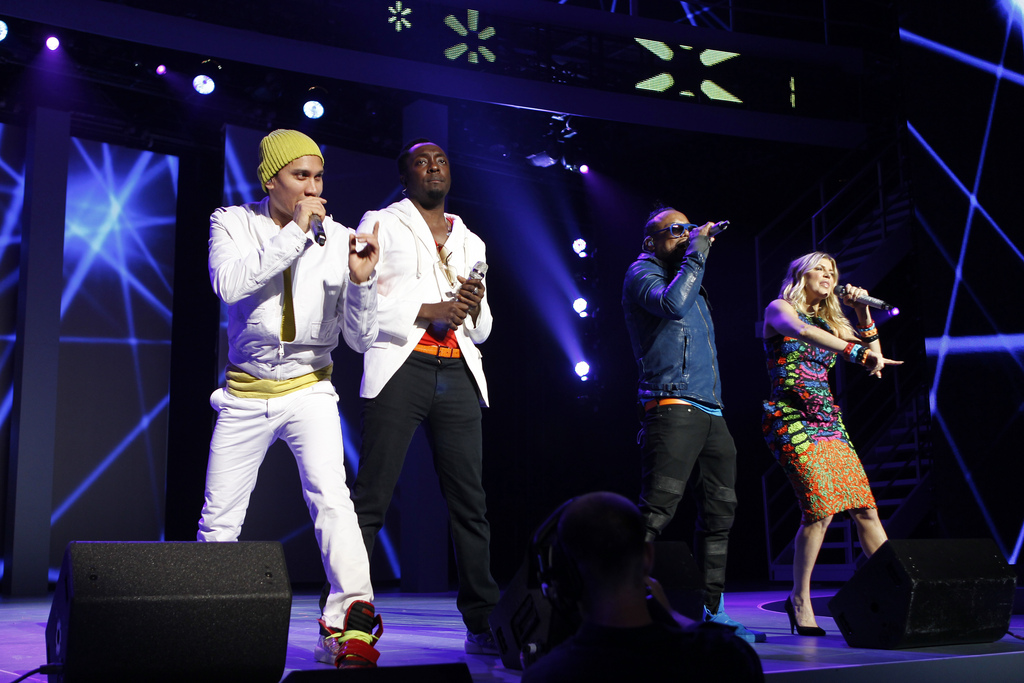
The Black Eyed Peas' "I Gotta Feeling" was the most-broadcast radio song for eight weeks.

Since July 2009, Israeli broadcast monitoring service Media Forest has been publishing four rankings which list the top ten most-broadcast Romanian and foreign songs on Romanian radio stations and television channels separately on a weekly basis. Nine radio stations—Europa FM, Info Pro, Kiss FM, Magic FM, National FM, Pro FM, Radio 21, Radio România Actualități and Radio ZU—and five television channels—1 Music Channel, Kiss TV, MTV Romania, Party TV and UTV Romania—were taken into consideration for the charts' compilation in 2009. They are based on the number of times tracks are broadcast, determined by acoustic fingerprinting.

Media Forest also releases year-end charts in regards to the radio airplay, listing the most-broadcast songs of Romanian origin (Note: Media Forest also includes Moldovan artists such as Dan Balan on the chart.) of the respective year, weighted by the official audience numbers provided by Asociația pentru Radio Audiență (Romanian Association for Audience Numbers). David Deejay and Dony reached number one on the 2009 ranking with "So Bizarre". In 2009, eight and eleven singles were listed by Media Forest as the most-broadcast tracks on radio and television respectively. The first were "Takin' Back My Love" by Enrique Iglesias and Ciara (radio) and "Undeva-n Balcani" by Puya and George Hora (television) in July 2009. "I Gotta Feeling" by the Black Eyed Peas spent eight weeks as the most-broadcast single on radio stations, longer than any other, while in terms of television airplay, this feat was achieved by Edward Maya and Vika Jigulina's "Stereo Love" with a total of six non-consecutive weeks. "Chica Bomb" by Dan Balan was the final top song of 2009 on both listings.

== Most-broadcast songs ==
Key
| ‡ | Indicates number-one Romanian song of the year |
| ❍ | Indicates song that topped the Romanian listing and was the most-broadcast overall |
| ◁ | Indicates song that topped the foreign listing and was the most-broadcast overall |

=== Radio ===
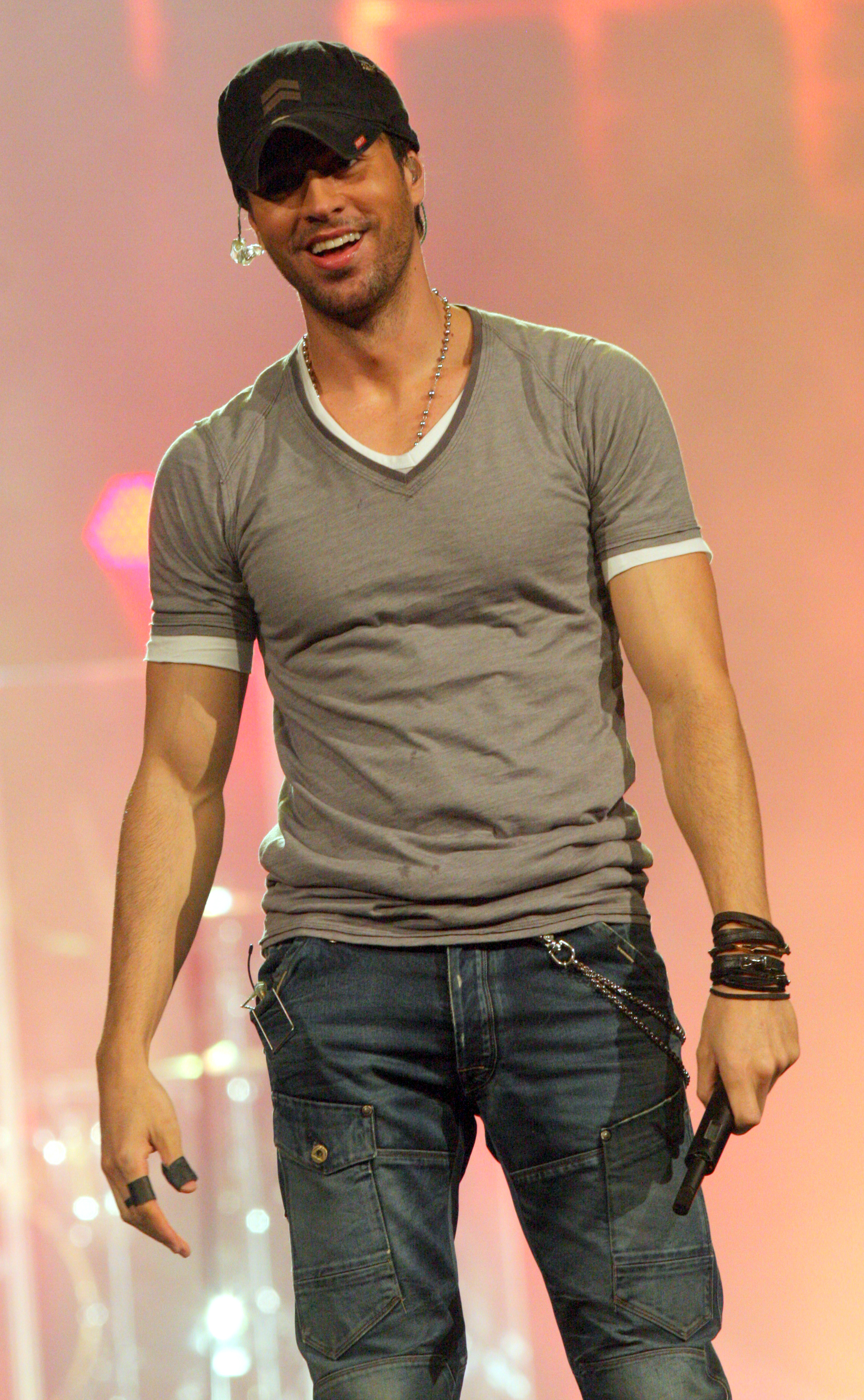
Enrique Iglesias (pictured) and Ciara's "Takin' Back My Love" was the first top radio airplay song listed by Media Forest.

List of most-broadcast songs on Romanian radio stations in 2009
| Artist(s) | Title | Issue date | Wks. |
|---|---|---|---|
| Enrique Iglesias featuring Ciara | "Takin' Back My Love"◁ | 6 July 2009 | 3 |
| David Deejay featuring Dony | "So Bizarre"‡❍ | 27 July 2009 | 2 |
| Neylini | "Muleina (DJ Andi Remix)"❍ | 10 August 2009 | 2 |
| David Deejay featuring Dony | "So Bizarre"‡❍ | 24 August 2009 | 1 |
| David Guetta featuring Kelly Rowland | "When Love Takes Over"◁ | 31 August 2009 | 1 |
| Pitbull | "I Know You Want Me (Calle Ocho)"◁ | 7 September 2009 | 4 |
| Inna | "Amazing"❍ | 5 October 2009 | 3 |
| The Black Eyed Peas | "I Gotta Feeling"◁ | 26 October 2009 | 8 |
| Dan Balan | "Chica Bomb"❍ | 21 December 2009 | 2 |

=== Television ===
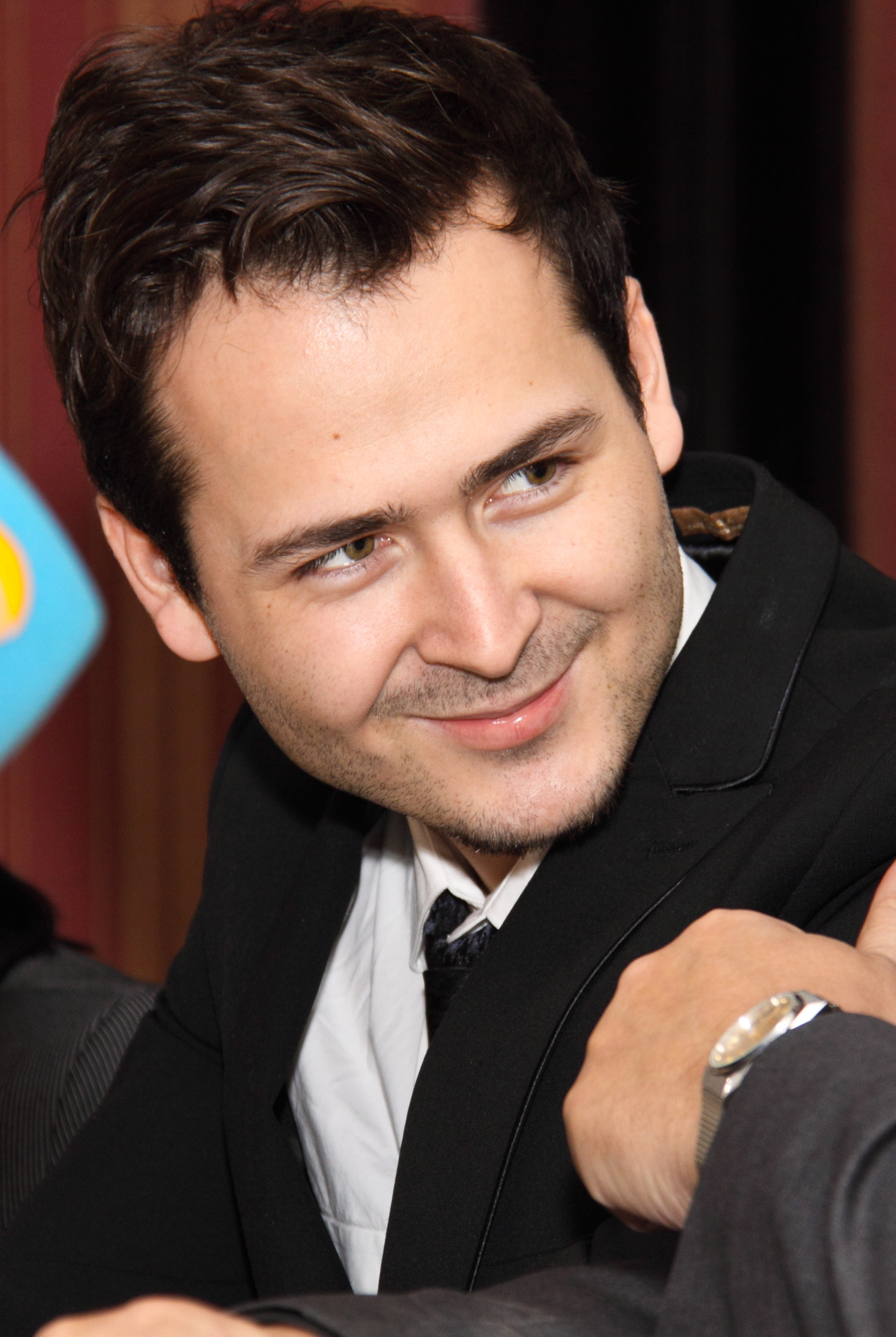
"Stereo Love" by Edward Maya (pictured) and Vika Jigulina received the most television broadcasts for six non-consecutive weeks.

List of most-broadcast songs on Romanian television channels in 2009
| Artist(s) | Title | Issue date | Wks. |
|---|---|---|---|
| Puya featuring George Hora | "Undeva-n Balcani"❍ | 6 July 2009 | 1 |
| A. R. Rahman and the Pussycat Dolls featuring Nicole Scherzinger | "Jai Ho! (You Are My Destiny)"◁ | 13 July 2009 | 1 |
| Edward Maya and Vika Jigulina | "Stereo Love"❍ | 20 July 2009 | 1 |
| A. R. Rahman and the Pussycat Dolls featuring Nicole Scherzinger | "Jai Ho! (You Are My Destiny)"◁ | 27 July 2009 | 1 |
| David Deejay featuring Dony | "So Bizarre"❍ | 3 August 2009 | 1 |
| Edward Maya and Vika Jigulina | "Stereo Love"❍ | 10 August 2009 | 5 |
| David Deejay featuring Dony | "So Bizarre"❍ | 14 September 2009 | 2 |
| Connect-R | "Burning Love"❍ | 28 September 2009 | 1 |
| Pitbull | "I Know You Want Me (Calle Ocho)"◁ | 5 October 2009 | 1 |
| Inna | "Amazing"❍ | 12 October 2009 | 4 |
| Puya featuring Kamelia and George Hora | "Change"❍ | 9 November 2009 | 1 |
| Inna | "Amazing"❍ | 16 November 2009 | 1 |
| Radio Killer | "Voila"❍ | 23 November 2009 | 2 |
| JLS | "Beat Again"◁ | 7 December 2009 | 1 |
| Dan Balan | "Chica Bomb"❍ | 14 December 2009 | 3 |
