= DiscO-Zone =

2004 album by O-Zone

Studio album by O-Zone
- Released: June 6, 2004
- Genres: Eurodance; EDM; pop; Pop rock
- Length: 44:17
- Labels: Cat; Ultra; Jive
- Producer: O-Zone

O-Zone chronology
Number 1 (2002)	DiscO-Zone (2004)	Ma Ya Hi (Dragostea Din Tei) [English Mixes] (2004)

Singles from DiscO-Zone
- 1. "Dragostea din tei" Released: June 20, 2003; 2. "De ce plâng chitarele" Released: 2004

Alternative cover
- Japanese re-release cover

DiscO-Zone is the third and final album by the Moldovan band O-Zone, released in June 2004. Produced by the band, the album features their hit singles "Dragostea din tei (Words of Love)" and "Despre tine (About You)". It was a commercial success in many European countries, particularly in Portugal where it hit number 1 for eight consecutive weeks and was in the Top 30 for twenty-six weeks. It also reached the Top 10 in Wallonia, Belgium, Poland, Norway, Switzerland, and Finland. In France, it only reached number 15 but stayed on the chart for thirty-six weeks. In Japan it reached the number 1 position in its twenty-fourth week on the chart.

== Track listing ==
All tracks are written by Dan Balan, except "De ce plâng chitarele" by Balan, Efim Crimerman and Mihai Dolgan.

No.	Title	Length
1.	"Fiesta de la noche (Night Party)"	4:01
2.	"De ce plâng chitarele (Why Are The Guitars Crying)"	4:11
3.	"Dragostea din tei (Words of Love)"	3:33
4.	"Printre nori (Among the clouds)"	3:43
5.	"Oriunde ai fi (Wherever you are)"	4:25
6.	"Numai tu (Only you)"	4:00
7.	"Dar, unde ești? (But, where are you?)"	4:02
8.	"Despre tine (About you)"	3:50
9.	"Sărbătoarea nopților de vară (Summer Nights Festival)"	3:51
10.	"Nu mă las de limba noastră... (I Won't Give Up Our Language...)"	3:49
11.	"Crede-mă (Believe me)"	4:44

U.S. version extras
No.	Title	Length
12.	"Ma Ya Hi (Dragostea Din Tei)" (Valentin Remix Radio Edit)	3:34
13.	"Ma Ya Hi (Dragostea Din Tei)" (English version)	3:35

Russian version extra
No.	Title	Length
12.	"Dragostea Din Tei (Words of Love)" (DJ Ross Extended Remix)

=== Romanian version ===
No.	Title	Length
1.	"Fiesta de la noche (Night Party)"	4:02
2.	"Oriunde ai fi (Wherever you are)"	4:26
3.	"De ce plâng chitarele (Why Guitars Cry)"	4:10
4.	"Crede-mă (Believe me)"	4:44
5.	"Dragostea din tei (Words of Love)"	3:33
6.	"Printre nori (Among the clouds)"	3:43
7.	"Despre tine (About you)" (Unu' In The Mix)	7:37
8.	"Dragostea Din Tei (Love of the Linden Trees)" (Unu' In The Dub Mix)	3:39
9.	"De ce plâng chitarele (Why the Guitars Cry)" (Radio version)	4:10

=== Japanese version ===
No.	Title	Japanese title	Length
1.	"Dragostea din tei"	ドラゴステア・ディン・テイ～恋のマイアヒ～	3:33
2.	"Fiesta de la Noche"	フェスタ・デ・ラ・ノーチェ	4:02
3.	"De Ce Plang Chitarele (Why Guitars Cry)"	デ・セ・プラン・チタレーレ	4:10
4.	"Printre Nori (Among the clouds)"	プリンテレ・ノリ	3:43
5.	"Oriunde Ai Fi (Wherever you are)"	オリウンデ・アイ・フィ	4:27
6.	"Numai Tu (Only you)"	ヌマイ・トゥ	4:01
7.	"Dar, Unde Esti? (But, where are you?)"	ダル、ウンデ・エスティ	4:02
8.	"Despre Tine (About you)" (Unu' In The Dub Mix)	デスプレ・ティーン	3:47
9.	"Sarbatoarea Noptilor de Vara" (Radio version)	サルバトアレ・ノプティロ・デ・バラ	3:51
10.	"Nu Ma Las de Limba Noastra..."	ヌマ・ラス・デ・リンバ・ノアストラ	3:50
11.	"Crede-ma (Believe me)"	クレデ・マ	4:46
12.	"Dragostea Din Tei (Love from The Linden Trees): Koi no Maiahi" (Overhead Champion Remix)	ドラゴステア・ディン・テイ～恋のマイアヒ～（オーバーヘッド・チャンピオン リミックス）
13.	"Dragostea Din Tei (Words of Love): Koi no Maiahi" (DJ Kaya & DJ Kousuke Remix)	ドラゴステア・ディン・テイ～恋のマイアヒ～（ＤＪカヤ＆ＤＪコウスケ・リミックス）
14.	"Dragostea Din Tei (Words of Love): Koi no Maiahi" (Eurobeat Remix)	ドラゴステア・ディン・テイ～恋のマイアヒ～（ユーロビート・リミックス）

== Members ==
- Dan Balan – vocals
- Arsenie Todiras – vocals
- Radu Sîrbu – vocals

== Charts ==
=== Weekly charts ===
Chart (2004/05)	Peak position
Austrian Albums (Ö3 Austria)	15
Belgian Albums (Ultratop Flanders)	63
Belgian Albums (Ultratop Wallonia)	3
Danish Albums (Hitlisten)	9
Dutch Albums (Album Top 100)	41
Finnish Albums (Suomen virallinen lista)	3
French Albums (SNEP)	15
German Albums (Offizielle Top 100)	16
Hungarian Albums (MAHASZ)	4
Japanese Albums (Oricon)	1
Norwegian Albums (VG-lista)	3
Polish Albums (ZPAV)	5
Portuguese Albums (AFP)	1
Spanish Albums (PROMUSICAE)	13
Swedish Albums (Sverigetopplistan)	39
Swiss Albums (Schweizer Hitparade)	7

=== Year-end charts ===
Chart (2004)	Position
Danish Albums (Hitlisten)	86
Finnish Albums (Suomen viralinen lista)	7
French Albums (SNEP)	99
German Albums (Offizielle Top 100)	92
Hungarian Albums (MAHASZ)	18
Portuguese Albums (AFP)	1
Swiss Albums (Schweizer Hitparade)	57

Chart (2005)	Position
Japanese Albums (Oricon)	12

== Certifications and sales ==
Region	Certification	Certified units/sales
Finland (Musiikkituottajat)	Gold	26,832
France (SNEP)	Gold	100,000^{*}
Hungary (MAHASZ)	Gold	10,000^{^}
Japan (RIAJ)	3× Platinum	900,000
Poland (ZPAV)	Gold	20,000^{*}
Portugal (AFP)	Platinum	40,000^{^}
Romania (UFPR)	Gold	Unknown
Russia (NFPF)	3× Platinum	60,000^{*}
Spain (Promusicae)	Gold	50,000^{^}
Switzerland (IFPI Switzerland)	Gold	20,000^{^}
^{*} Sales figures based on certification alone.^{^} Shipments figures based on certification alone.

== Release history ==
Region	Date	Label	Catalog
Europe	June 6, 2004	Polydor Records	986 700-9
United States	November 2, 2004	Ultra Records	B00065U04A
Japan	August 24, 2005	Avex Trax	AVCD-17777/B
Japan	October 12, 2005	Avex Trax	AVCD-17823
Japan	December 21, 2005	Avex Trax	AVCD-17830/B

== See also ==
- List of music released by Moldovan artists that has charted in major music markets
