= Mm-ma-ma =

Single by Crazy Loop also known as Dan Bălan

from the album The Power of Shower
- A-side: "Mm-ma-ma"
- B-side: "Numa Numa 2 (Dragostea Din Tei 2008)"
- Released: 27 March 2008 12 October 2009 (U.K.)
- Recorded: 2007
- Genre: Europop; Dance-pop
- Length: 3:35
- Label: MediaPro Music PopLife Records (U.K.)
- Songwriter: Dan Bălan
- Producer: Dan Bălan

Crazy Loop also known as Dan Bălan singles chronology
"Mm-ma-ma" (2008)	""Joanna (Shut Up!)"" (2008)

"Mm-ma-ma" is the first single from the pop and dance musical project Crazy Loop by the Moldovan singer Dan Bălan. It was released on 17 October 2007, from his debut album The Power of Shower. The song is about love.

== UK release ==
In August 2009, it was announced that "Mm-ma-ma" would be released in the United Kingdom via new pop label PopLife Records. On 4 September 2009, the music video was added to popular UK television channel "The Box". The single was released digitally on 12 October 2009.

== Music video ==
A fashion show is being held, but the audience of fashionistas and rich elites is already bored and disinterested. Backstage, the fashion director is helping one of the female models in the show with her outfit. The director smells something off. However, it's revealed that it's Crazy Loop, delivering a pizza in a pizza-shop uniform. The model woman tries to get a taste, but the fashion director forbids her, slapping her hand away and tries the pizza himself. However, the director dislikes the taste and spits it in the trash.

Several women in the show head for the runway, along with the director. Crazy Loop tries to follow, but the director nudges him back, forbidding him to enter. With no one around, Crazy Loop tries on a suit and a pair of odd sunglasses out of curiosity. He then mischievously walks out to the runway and crashes the show.

The bored audience members then begin to stir and wake up, noticing Crazy Loop dancing in front of the women. The director notices him as well, and starts to get upset, glaring at him. He tries to send one of the models to lure Crazy Loop off the stage (which he only brushes off), and even tries to go out himself, before realizing he'd interfere with the show.

A VIP arrives, noticing the commotion. At first, it seems that the VIP will reject the absurdity of the show, about to give a thumbs down, causing the director to frown in panic; however, the VIP ends up giving a thumbs up, causing the entire audience to erupt in cheers.

As Crazy Loop continues to dance on the runway, the director rushes backstage and cobbles together several outfits out of various materials and odd objects to exhibit to the audience (one even involving the pizza Crazy Loop delivered).

As the show turns into a party, the audience members enjoy slices of pizza, and the director walks out onto the stage with Crazy Loop, highlighting him as the star and hero of the show. The director then offers him a popcorn basket, eager to know what he will do with it to add to the show. Crazy Loop tosses the popcorn into the air and showers the entire showroom.

With pizza being eaten, popcorn in the air, the VIP enjoying the spectacle, and the elite guests happy and content, the fashion show is featured on the cover of worldwide magazines as a huge success.

Drag queen Tammie Brown, known for participating in RuPaul's Drag Race, makes a cameo appearance in the video.

== Track listing ==
CD single

1. "Mm-ma-ma (Original Mix)" – 3:34
2. "Mm-ma-ma (The Age of Steam Remix)" – 3:18
3. "Numa Numa 2 (Dragostea Din Tei 2008)" - 3:29

== Remixes ==
On Crazy Loop's album The Power of Shower are two remixes:

- Mm-ma-ma: "DJ Ross Radio Club Edit" (Track 10, Length: 3:54)
- Mm-ma-ma: "The Age of Steam Remix" (Track 11, Length: 3:20)

=== Other versions ===
In 2011, Vietnamese band HKT covered this song for their album 'Mặt trái của sự thật' ('The Flip Side of the Truth'), the song was retitled 'Oh My Baby'.

== Charts ==
The song was on the charts for three weeks in Germany and Austria. In Poland, it ranked #41. In Romania, the song spent nine weeks at number one.

Chart (2007–08)	Peak position
Austria (Ö3 Austria Top 40)	49
CIS (Tophit)	143
Germany (GfK)	18
Poland (Polish music chart)	41
Romania (Romanian Singles Chart)	1

== See also ==
- List of Romanian Top 100 number ones of the 2000s
- List of music released by Moldovan artists that has charted in major music markets
