= List of music released by Moldovan artists that has charted in major music markets =

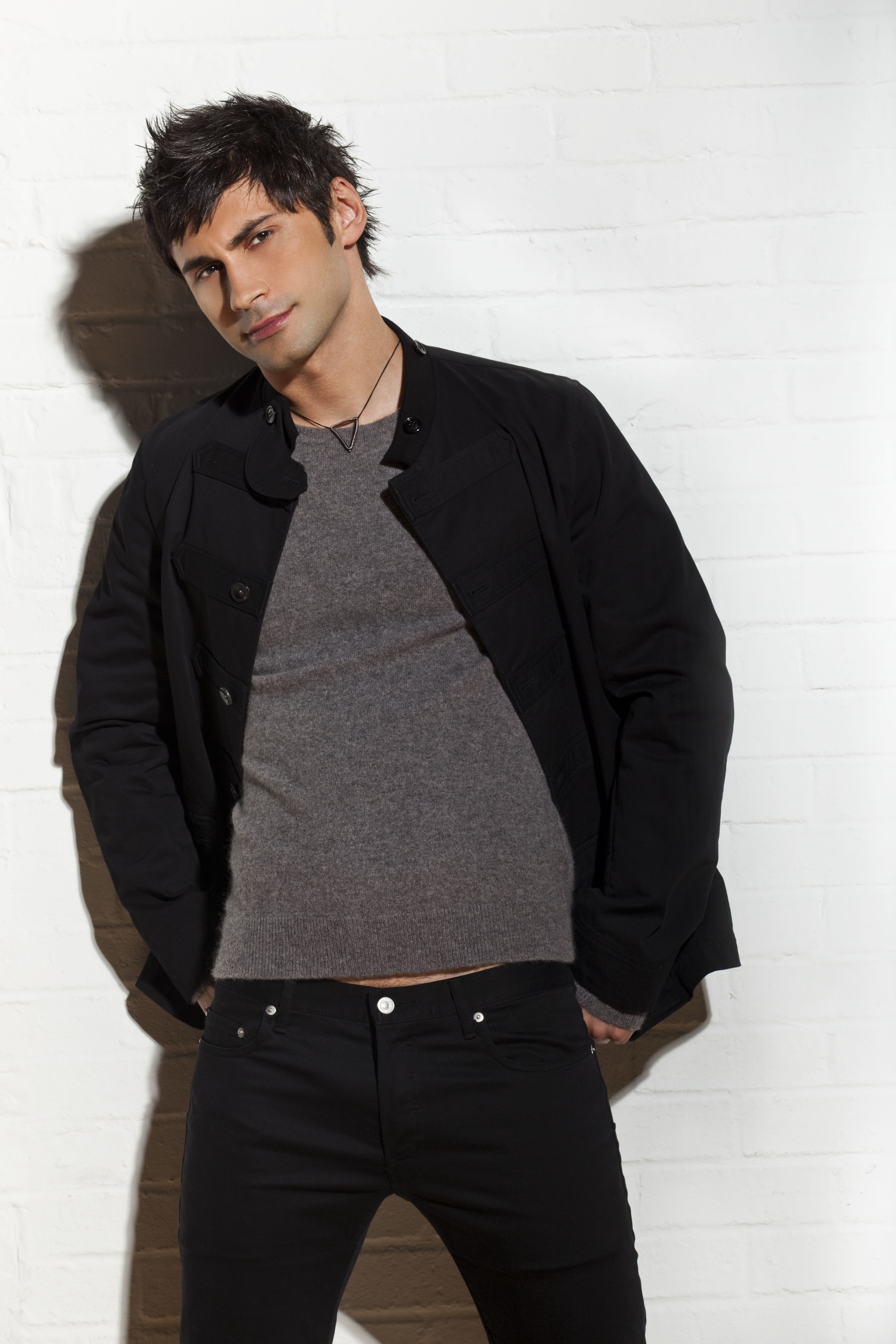
Moldovan singer Dan Balan has charted multiple songs in the world's largest music markets, most notably the worldwide hit "Dragostea din tei" (2003) as part of the group O-Zone.

Since the 2000s, songs and albums released by Moldovan (Note: This article lists all charting releases, where there is at least one Moldovan artist or act credited among the lead or featured artist(s).) artists have charted and received certifications in the world's largest music markets. (Note: The International Federation of the Phonographic Industry (IFPI) has annually published the ten largest recorded music markets. This list takes into consideration the countries that have made the most appearances on the IFPI reports throughout the years.) The first Moldovan act to chart in such markets was the group O-Zone. Their release "Dragostea din tei" (2003) was the first song performed in Romanian to experience worldwide commercial success. This included topping the charts in France, Germany, the Netherlands, and Spain, and reaching number three in the United Kingdom. The track has since been certified diamond by the French Syndicat national de l'édition phonographique (SNEP) and quadruple million by the Recording Industry Association of Japan (RIAJ), among others. Uses of "Dragostea din tei" in other works have experienced varying levels of success and the song stands as one of the best-selling singles of all time with sales of over 12 million copies. Its parent album, DiscO-Zone (2003) went on to peak at number one in Japan, where it was certified triple platinum. Selected versions of it also include the group's fellow single "Despre tine" (2002), which became a top ten hit in France, Germany, Italy, and Spain upon the success of "Dragostea din tei".

From 2005 to 2009, O-Zone members Arsenium and Dan Balan (the latter also using the pseudonym Crazy Loop) have charted solo releases in France and Germany, with Balan's "Chica Bomb" (2009) reaching number 44 on the UK singles chart. Also in 2009, Edward Maya and Vika Jigulina, the former of Romanian origin, released "Stereo Love", which was a top ten hit and awarded certifications in multiple major music markets. It also became the first song by a Moldovan act to appear on the main charts of Brazil, Canada, and the United States, reaching numbers 8, 19 and 16, respectively. Maya and Jigulina's follow-up single, "This Is My Life" (2009), went on to reach number two in France. In 2011, "All My People" by Sasha Lopez, Andreea D, and Broono became the second song of Moldovan origin to chart in Canada, where it peaked at number 41, and also reached the top 50 in Germany and Spain.

Some of the Moldovan entries competing in the Eurovision Song Contest have also experienced limited success, most notably 2017's third place "Hey Mamma" by the group SunStroke Project. In 2018, Balan released a continuation to "Dragostea din tei" titled "Numa Numa 2", which peaked at number 64 on the Japan Hot 100. Over the years, some Moldovan songs have received international attention as part of viral memes, including "Dragostea din tei" upon its feature in American vlogger Gary Brolsma's 2004 video "Numa Numa Dance", and "Run Away" (2010) by SunStroke Project and singer Olia Tira after group member Sergey Stepanov had been dubbed the "Epic Sax Guy" for the way he played a saxophone sequence on the track at the Eurovision Song Contest 2010.

== Charted releases ==
Key
◁	Indicates an artist not born Moldovan
†	Indicates a song that has participated in the Eurovision Song Contest

=== Albums ===
List of charting albums, with selected chart positions and certifications
Year	Title	Artist	Peak chart positions					Certifications
Year	Title	Artist	FRA	GER	JPN	NLD	SPA	Certifications
2003	DiscO-Zone	O-Zone	15	16	1	41	54	PROMUSICAE: Gold; RIAJ: 3× Platinum; SNEP: Gold
"—" denotes an album that did not chart or was not released in that territory.

=== Songs ===
List of charting songs, with selected chart positions and certifications
Year	Title	Artist	Peak chart positions										Certifications
Year	Title	Artist	BRA	CAN	FRA	GER	ITA	JPN	NLD	SPA	UK	US	Certifications
2002	"Despre tine"	O-Zone	—	—	2	9	8	―	27	4	—	—	SNEP: Gold
2003	"Dragostea din tei"	O-Zone	—	—	1	1	17	72	1	1	3	— (Note: "Dragostea din tei" did not chart on the Billboard Hot 100, but "Ma Ya Hi", an English-language version featuring Lucas Prata, reached number 16 on the magazine's Bubbling Under Hot 100 chart.)	BPI: Gold; BVMI: 2× Platinum; FIMI: Gold; NVPI: Platinum; PROMUSICAE: Gold; RIAA: Gold; RIAJ: 4× Million (Note: This reflects the highest certification awarded to "Dragostea din tei" in Japan, which denotes ringtone sales. The song was further certified platinum and gold in other formats.); SNEP: Diamond
2004	"De ce plâng chitarele"	O-Zone	—	—	17	—	—	―	—	—	—	—	
2005	"Love Me... Love Me..."	Arsenium	—	—	36	33	—	―	—	—	—	—	
2005	"Megamix"	O-Zone	—	—	25	—	—	―	—	—	—	—	
2008	"Rumadai"	Arsenium	—	—	—	32	—	―	—	—	—	—	
2008	"Mm-ma-ma"	Crazy Loop	—	—	—	18	—	―	—	—	—	—	
2009	"Chica Bomb"	Dan Balan	—	—	—	37	—	―	— (Note: "Chica Bomb" did not chart on the Dutch Single Top 100, but reached number 21 on the Tipparade ranking, an extension to the Dutch Top 40.)	—	44	—	
2009	"Stereo Love"	Edward Maya◁ featuring Vika Jigulina	8	19	1	4	4	―	5	1	4	16	BPI: 2× Platinum; BVMI: 2× Platinum; FIMI: 2× Platinum; MC: 2× Platinum; PROMUSICAE: 2× Platinum; RIAA: Platinum
2009	"This Is My Life"	Edward Maya◁ featuring Vika Jigulina	—	—	2	—	—	―	42	—	— (Note: "This Is My Life" did not chart on the UK singles chart, but reached number 36 on the UK dance singles chart.)	—	
2011	"All My People"	Sasha Lopez and Andreea D◁ featuring Broono	—	41	—	42	—	―	—	30	—	—	MC: Gold
2016	"Sub pielea mea"	Carla's Dreams	—	—	60	—	—	―	—	—	—	—	
2017	"Hey Mamma"†	SunStroke Project	—	—	― (Note: "Hey Mamma" did not chart on the French singles chart, but reached number 56 on the French singles downloads chart.)	52	—	―	70	89	— (Note: "This Is My Life" did not chart on the UK singles chart, but reached number 51 on the UK Singles Downloads Chart.)	—	
2017	"Who You Are"	Mihail	—	—	—	—	51	―	—	—	—	—	FIMI: Platinum
2018	"Numa Numa 2"	Dan Balan featuring Marley Waters◁	—	—	—	—	—	64	—	—	—	—	
2022	"Trenulețul"†	Zdob și Zdub and Advahov Brothers	—	—	—	—	—	―	—	—	— (Note: "Trenulețul" did not chart on the UK singles chart, but reached number 48 on the UK Singles Downloads Chart.)	—	
2023	"Soarele și luna"†	Pasha Parfeni	—	—	—	— (Note: "Soarele și luna" did not chart on the German Singles Chart, but reached number 92 on the German Downloads Chart.)	—	―	—	—	— (Note: "Soarele și luna" did not chart on the UK singles chart, but reached number 63 on the UK Singles Downloads Chart.)	—	
2025	"Don't Leave (Kylie)"	Akcent◁, Sera◁ and Misha Miller	—	—	—	—	—	—	— (Note: "Don't Leave (Kylie)" did not chart on the Dutch Single Top 100, but reached number 25 on the Dutch Single Tip chart.)	—	—	—	
2026	"Viva, Moldova!"†	Satoshi	—	—	—	—	—	—	—	—	— (Note: "Viva, Moldova!" did not chart on the UK singles chart, but reached number 15 on the UK Indie Breakers Charts.)	—	
"—" denotes a recording that did not chart or was not released in that territory.

== See also ==
- Music of Moldova
- List of music released by Romanian artists that has charted in major music markets
