= MTV Romania Music Awards 2003 =

Romanian music awards ceremony

2003 MTV Romania Music Awards
- Date: 5 June 2003
- Location: Sala Polivalentă, Bucharest

Television/radio coverage
- Network: MTV Romania

The second annual MTV Romania Music Awards (Premiile muzicale MTV România) were held at Sala Polivalentă in Bucharest.

== Winners ==
- Best Rock: IRIS//Uriah Heep
- Best DJ: Rhadoo
- Best Group: Class
- Best Male: Marius Moga
- Best Female: Andra
- Best Live: Voltaj
- Best website: www.annes.ro
- Best New Act: Unu VS. George Nicolescu
- Best Song: O-Zone
- Best Dance: O-Zone
- Best Hip-Hop: Paraziţii
- Best Pop: Class
- Best Album: Animal X
- Best Video: Zdob şi Zdub
- Life Time Award: Phoenix
- Free Your Mind: "Litoralul pentru toţi" – Dan Matei Agathon
