= The Power of Shower =

Studio album by Crazy Loop
- Released: December 2, 2007
- Genre: Dance-pop; Europop; Electro house
- Length: 43:17
- Label: MediaPro Music
- Producer: Dan Bălan

Crazy Loop chronology
The Power of Shower (2007)	The Remixes (2013)

The Power of Shower is the only full-length studio album from Dan Bălan's Crazy Loop act. The album was released on December 2, 2007. He is best known for being part of the O-Zone pop band.

The album is produced by himself and features his hit single "Crazy Loop". The album features a mix of both dance and rock songs in English, Romanian and one in Japanese.

His hit single "Mm-ma-ma" had a CD single release in March 2008.

The second single off the album is "Joanna (Shut Up!)". The video was released in the summer of 2008.

== Track listing ==
1. "Mm-ma-ma" — 3:35
2. "Joanna (Shut Up!)" — 3:40
3. "Love Is a Simple Thing" — 3:09
4. "Uh-Ahh-Yeah" — 3:26
5. "Famikon" — 2:34
6. "Tango" — 3:28
7. "Take Me Higher" — 3:38
8. "Despre Tine Cant (Part 2)" — 4:05
9. "The 24th Letter" — 4:43
10. "Mm-ma-ma (DJ Ross Radio Club Edit)" — 3:54
11. "Mm-ma-ma (The Age Of Steam Remix)" — 3:20
12. "Joanna (Shut Up!) (Radio Edit Alternative Option)" — 3:46
