= Dar, Unde Ești... =

Dar, unde ești...

Studio album by O-Zone
- Released: 2000
- Genre: Eurodance; pop; electronica
- Label: Media Services

O-Zone chronology
Dar, unde ești... (2000)	Number 1 (2002)

Dar, unde ești is the debut album of the Moldovan band O-Zone, and the only one to be released by the original lineup of the band (with only Dan Bălan and Petru Jelihovschi as members). It was released in Moldova under the Media Services label, a sub-label of Sony Music Entertainment, in 2000.

== Track listing ==
1. "Fiesta de la noche" - (ES:) Night Party
2. "Timpul trece fără noi" - Time Passes Without Us
3. "M-aș trezi" - I'd Wake Up
4. "Te voi iubi" - I'll Love You
5. "Dar, unde ești...?!" - But, Where Are You?
6. "Te aștept" - I'm Waiting For You
7. "Crede-mă" - Believe Me
8. "În doi" - Folded In Two
9. "De la mine" - From Me
10. "Ciao bambina" - (IT:) Bye Babe
11. "Oriunde-ai fi" - Wherever You Are
12. "În doi (negativ)"
13. "Surpriza de Anul Nou" - New Year's Eve Surprise
