= Media Forest =

Israeli company

- Industry: Music
- Founded: 2005; 21 years ago
- Headquarters: Israel
- Website: Media Forest

Media Forest is an Israeli service provider of monitoring and media research for the Music and Advertisement Industries, founded in 2005 in Netanya, Israel. The company monitors broadcasting tracks and channels such as radio stations and TV channels, and accordingly, provides added-value content and information services. The company provides subscription services through Internet interfaces that track content (mentions, commercials, speech, performances) and provide real time information to artists, media companies, and publishers.

Since founding Media Forest, the company has established regional franchise owners operating in France, Argentina, Moldova, Belgium, Bulgaria, Romania, Greece, and Switzerland. In Romania, Media Forest provided data for the country's national Airplay 100 chart.

== Weekly charts ==
Media Forest publishes an airplay chart once a week, every Sunday. The airplay charts contain data generated by the Media Forest system according to any song played during the period starting the previous Sunday at time 00:00:00 and ending Saturday night at 23:59:59.

The weekly chart was published by Mako, and actually on the official website.

Media Forest publishes charts for several countries. For Romania's, see:

- List of Media Forest most-broadcast songs of 2009 in Romania
- List of Media Forest most-broadcast songs of the 2010s in Romania
- List of Media Forest most-broadcast songs of the 2020s in Romania

== Media Music Awards ==
The Media Music Awards is an annual awards gala organized in Romania by MTV, based on radio and television airplay data compiled by Media Forest.

== See also ==
- Mako Hitlist, another weekly music chart in Israel
