= Dan Balan =

Moldovan musician (born 1979)

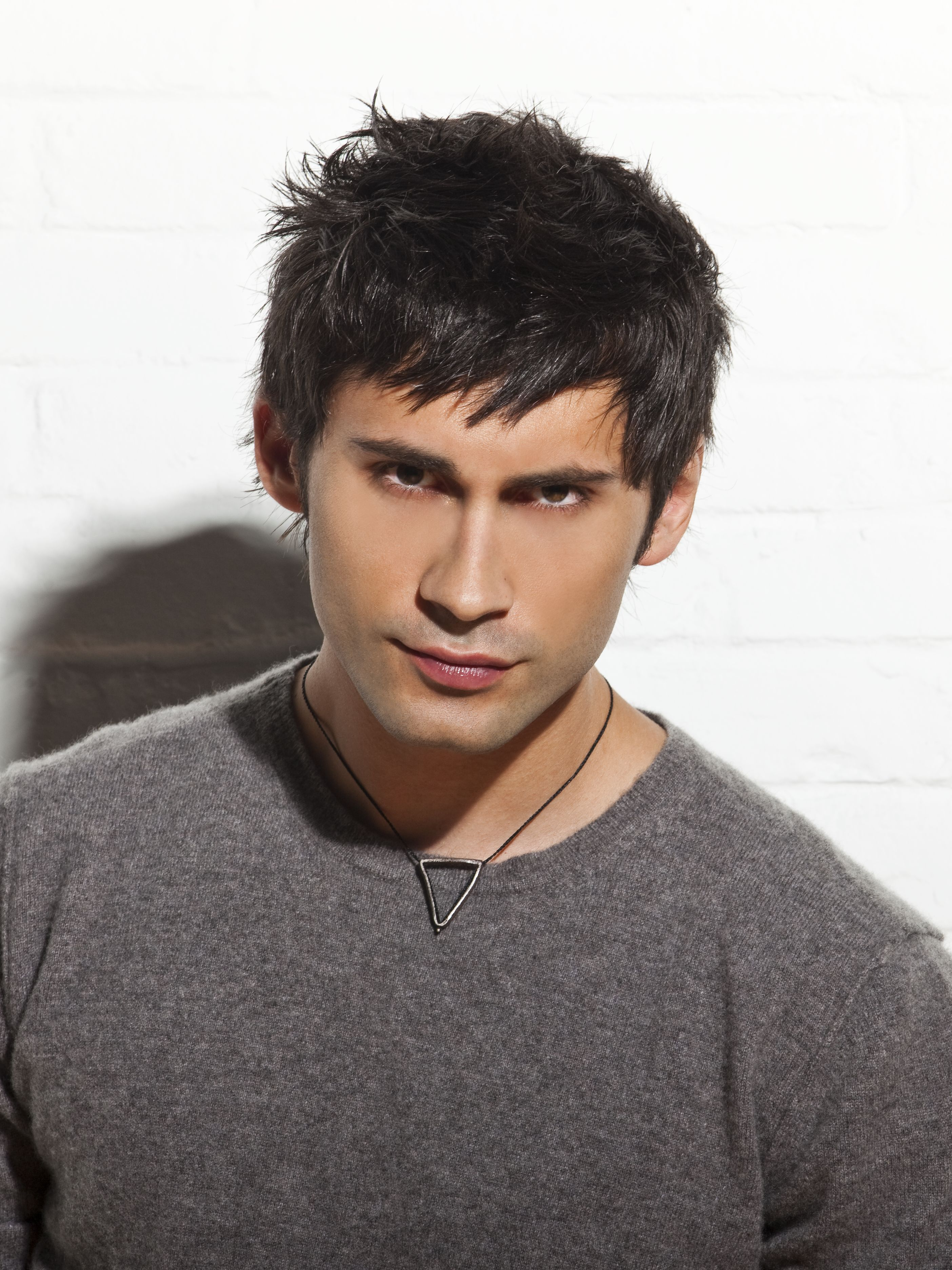
- Balan in 2009

Background information
- Also known as: Crazy Loop
- Born: Dan Bălan; 6 February 1979 (age 47); Chișinău, Moldavian SSR, Soviet Union
- Origin: Chișinău, Moldova
- Genres: Rock; Dance; Pop; Pop Rock
- Occupations: Musician; singer; songwriter; record producer; judge
- Instruments: Vocals; keyboards; guitar; bass guitar; piano
- Years active: 1996–present
- Labels: Sony Music, Universal Music, EMI, Gala Records/Warner, Media Pro Music, First Music Publishing
- Formerly of: Inferialis, O-Zone
- Website: danbalan.com

Dan Balan (Note: Also iterated Dan Mihailovici Balan after the former Soviet and modern Russian form of the name) (born 6 February 1979) is a Moldovan musician, singer, songwriter, and record producer. He is the founder of Moldovan Eurodance band O-Zone, and wrote their international hit single "Dragostea din tei", which topped the charts in 32 countries and sold 12 million copies worldwide.

== Early life ==
Dan Bălan was born on 6 February 1979 in Chișinău, to Mihai Balan, a diplomat, and Ludmila Balan, a TV presenter. He has a sister, TV presenter Sanda Bălan (born 1984). His maternal grandfather, Boris Vasiliev, was deported to Siberia as a child.

He was given his first instrument, a second-hand accordion, as a present at age 11 and began pursuing music. Bălan attended music school, but his parents urged him to attend university to study law. After following their wishes for a short time, he eventually left law school to play with his first band Inferialis, a gothic doom metal band.

== Career ==
=== 1996–1998: Inferialis ===
After Bălan formed the band, Inferialis held its first concert in 1995 in a concert hall in one of Chișinău's factories. His entire family was present at the concert, and his parents having been impressed by the performance bought him an expensive synthesizer. He spent the next two years performing with the band, taking several small gigs, and then decided to move to commercial-sounding music. In an interview, he explained that he had never considered himself a heavy metal musician and instead identified as a producer with an interest in working with varying musical styles. He started experimenting and exploring a new, commercial pop sound, and recorded and released his first solo song, "De la Mine", in 1998.

=== 1998–2005: Breakthrough with O-Zone ===
==== “Dar, unde ești?” ====
In 1998, Bălan formed O-Zone, a new musical project, with Petru Jelihovschi, former vocalist in Inferialis. The duo released their first album entitled Dar, unde ești later that year and it became a commercial hit with seven of the album's ten songs reaching number one on the charts of the main radio stations in Moldova. At the same time, he became a producer of a new children's TV show called Tanti Ludmila Show, which was hosted by his mother. When the show needed a title song, the singer offered up a track he had written when he was younger.

==== “Number 1” ====
Shortly afterwards, Jelihovschi left the band to take up his own career in television. In order to continue the band, Bălan announced auditions to select new band members. He auditioned several individuals but was unable to find somebody who fit his concept for the music. Finally, Arsenie Todiraș, who he met through his vocal coach, was selected. After the auditions were closed, Radu Sirbu heard about the selection and requested Bălan to audition him. Subsequently, Sirbu became the third member of the band.

Throughout 2001, Bălan wrote and recorded O-Zone's second album, Number 1. Four Romanian record labels offered the band a deal. O-Zone chose Cat Music and their album was released in 2002 by the label. Much to Bălan's disappointment, the album did not become an instant commercial success. However, O-Zone won Best Music Video Award at the MTV Romania Music Awards in 2002 for their single "Numai tu". The album's second single, "Despre Tine", was more experimental, driven by the singer's goal of working in styles of music which were completely different from those dictating the Romanian music industry at that time. The song became a commercial success and reached number one on Romania Airplay Top 100, where it stayed for seventeen consecutive weeks. The next year, O-Zone won two more MTV Romania Music Awards, for Best Song and Best Dance. The band was also nominated for Best Romanian Act at the MTV Europe Music Awards.

==== Fame with “Dragostea Din Tei” ====
The song "Dragostea Din Tei", also known as the "Numa Numa Song", which was released in 2003, brought the group to global prominence. The single, written and produced by Bălan, reached the number one position on the charts of more than thirty countries and was the third bestselling single in the U.K that year. It sold more than 8 million copies worldwide, receiving a gold and multi-platinum certification in most of the countries of Europe, Asia and Latin America. It became the bestselling track in Europe and Japan in 2004 and 2005. Over the years, more than two hundred artists have sung the song in fourteen different languages. "Dragostea Din Tei" is one of the best-selling singles in the history of world music.

==== “DiscO-Zone” ====
In 2004, O-Zone won Best Dance Award again at MTV Romania Music Awards and, for the second year in a row, they were nominated for Best Romanian Act at the MTV Europe Music Awards. Later that year, the band unveiled their third album, DiscO-Zone, which became their best-selling release, certified gold and platinum in various countries. By the end of the year, it was the best-selling album in Japan, Europe and Latin America. In France, it was number fifteen but stayed for 36 weeks in the top 200. In Japan it reached the number one position in its 24th week on the chart. DiscO-Zone featured their hit singles "Dragostea Din Tei" and "Despre Tine (About You)". The album was a commercial success in many European countries, particularly in Portugal where it was hit number one for eight consecutive weeks and was ranked for 26 weeks in the top 30. It also reached the top ten in Wallonia (Belgium), Poland, Norway, Switzerland, and Finland.

By late 2004, O-Zone released another single "De Ce Plang Chitarele", which was a cover of a song by the Moldovan band Noroc. Commenting on their songs and style, Radio Free Europe/Radio Liberty wrote that they have "breathed fresh air into European Pop Music Scene." O-Zone announced their breakup in 2005, right at the peak of their fame and popularity. Their last European concert was held at the 2005 Golden Stag music festival in Romania.

=== 2006–2009: Unreleased Solo Album and Crazy Loop project ===
==== Unreleased Album with “Balan” ====
After O-Zone's break-up, Bălan started the eponymous rock group “Balan” and began working on new music. He moved to Los Angeles in early 2006 to record at Ocean Way. There he recorded and co-produced his first solo rock album with Jack Joseph Puig. Despite having recorded the album, the singer did not release it. However, some songs, such as “Cry Cry” and “The 24th Letter” were later released as part of his 2012 album “Freedom, Part 1”.

==== Crazy Loop ====
He returned from the U.S. in early 2007 and began working on a new experimental musical project. Bălan performed the songs, which were a deviation from his prior material, in a falsetto voice. These shifts led him to decide to release the music under the stage name Crazy Loop, an alter ego that contrasted with his real personality. The musician described Crazy Loop as "funnier, crazier and more ironic" than himself and said, "I'm not like that really but part of Crazy Loop lives inside me." Bălan officially launched Crazy Loop in October 2007 with new single "Crazy Loop (Mm Ma Ma)", which landed on the charts in Germany, Austria, Poland and Romania, as well as on European chart Euro Hot 200.

Crazy Loop's debut album, The Power of Shower, was released in December, and included some of the songs Bălan had created for his unreleased album in Los Angeles, the previous year. The album's second single, "Johanna, Shut Up!" was released in the summer of 2008 along with a music video directed and shot in Los Angeles by Marc Klasfeld. The single was the final official track released under the name Crazy Loop. The artist released a third single from The Power of Shower in October 2008 under his own name, Dan Bălan. The track, a rock ballad called "Despre Tine Cant (Part 2)," dropped in Romania and Moldova and was accompanied by a music video directed by Greg Olive. Crazy Loop was nominated for Best Romanian Act at the 2008 MTV Europe Music Awards but lost to Morandi.

Later in 2009, the singer re-released The Power of the Shower album as Crazy Loop Mix, an exclusive release with four new tracks, which included "Friday Night", "My Best Summer", "Judy's Love Line" and new single "Chica Bomb". This release marked the beginning of a new phase in his solo career. In November 2009 acting President of Moldova Mihai Ghimpu, awarded him the honorary title of Master in Art for successes in creative activity, contributions to propagation of musical art and high performing artistry.

==== Nomination for Grammy Award ====
In 2008, Bălan was contacted by producers to become co-writer of Rihanna and T.I.'s "Live Your Life", since the song sampled and was extensively based on the melody of “Dragostea Din Tei”. The song stayed at number one on the Billboard Hot 100 chart for six weeks following its release, jumping from number eighty to number one in just one week. "Live Your Life" was certified 4× Platinum, with 4,532,000 copies sold in the U.S. In 2009, his co-writing of the song lead to Bălan being nominated for a Grammy Award, the first and only Moldovan ever to do so.

==== Disney voice acting ====
The artist was chosen by Disney Channel Romania to sing the theme song from the series Brandy & Mr. Whiskers.

=== 2010–2012: Freedom, Part 1 ===
==== “Chica Bomb” ====
Bălan's solo single "Chica Bomb" which featured vocals from American singer Katie DiCicco and production from Italian DJ Andrea Bertolini, was officially released in 2010. The song became a hit in Europe and made it into the top ten charts in several European countries, including Germany, Denmark, Austria, Romania, Russia, Greece, and the U.K., where it reached No. 7 on the U.K. Dance Chart. The track received positive reviews from music critics. Nick Levine, from Britain's Digital Spy described "Chica Bomb" as "a sleek and reasonably sexy electro-house track with a nice bit of synthy bounce to it." It became one of the five most played songs on Radio in Bulgaria and Romania. The video for the song was directed by Hype Williams.

Bălan re-recorded the single in Greece as a duet with Greek pop star Eleni Foureira. The duo launched the new Greek version at the MAD Video Music Awards in Athens in May 2010. The song continued its global dominance and Bălan was invited as a special guest to the Russian music industry's annual awards ceremony, the Muz-TV Awards, on 11 June 2010, where he performed the single.

==== “Justify Sex” ====
The singer unveiled his next single, "Justify Sex" in July 2010 at the Europa Plus Live festival in Moscow. It reached number one on the Russian charts, where it remained for 43 weeks. A video for the song was directed by Jesse Dylan, who shot the video in Los Angeles and based its concept around the movie Friday the 13th.

==== "Лепестками Слёз" (Lepestkami Slöz) ====
Following the success of two consecutive singles reaching number one on the charts, Bălan decided to shift his focus to the Eastern European market. In the summer of 2010 he recorded lyrical song "Лепестками Слёз", translated as “Petals of Tears”, as a duet with Vera Brezhneva, who he had met in New York. The song, Bălan's first in Russian, was released on 29 October and became his third consecutive number one single in Russia. Its music video was shot by Ukrainian video director Sergei Solodky and earned over 24 million views on YouTube, becoming the most watched Russian-language music video in the history of Russian music. The song was nominated for Best Duo at the awards for Russian music channel RU.TV in 2011. He won a Golden Gramophone Award, Russia's most prestigious music prize, for his single "Лепестками Слёз" at the 16th Golden Gramophone awards ceremony in the State Kremlin Palace in Moscow. The artist was nominated for the Best Romanian Act for the fourth time at the 2010 MTV Europe Music Awards.

==== “Freedom” ====
Bălan released a new English single, "Freedom", which featured American singer Corey Gibson and DJ Andrea Bertolini, in the spring of 2011. The song reached the Top 30 in Russia and Ukraine, and eventually bowed at number two on the charts. In Romania, the single went to number four on the Romanian Top 100 in 2011. The song remained on the charts for a total of 49 weeks. Bălan started recording the video for "Freedom", which was directed by Pavel Hudeakov in May 2011 in southern France. While recording for the song, the singer climbed up and stood on a steep cliff without protective equipment. In an interview after the official video was released, he said that the video was one of the most dangerous shootings of his career.

==== "Лишь До Утра" (Lish Do Utra) ====
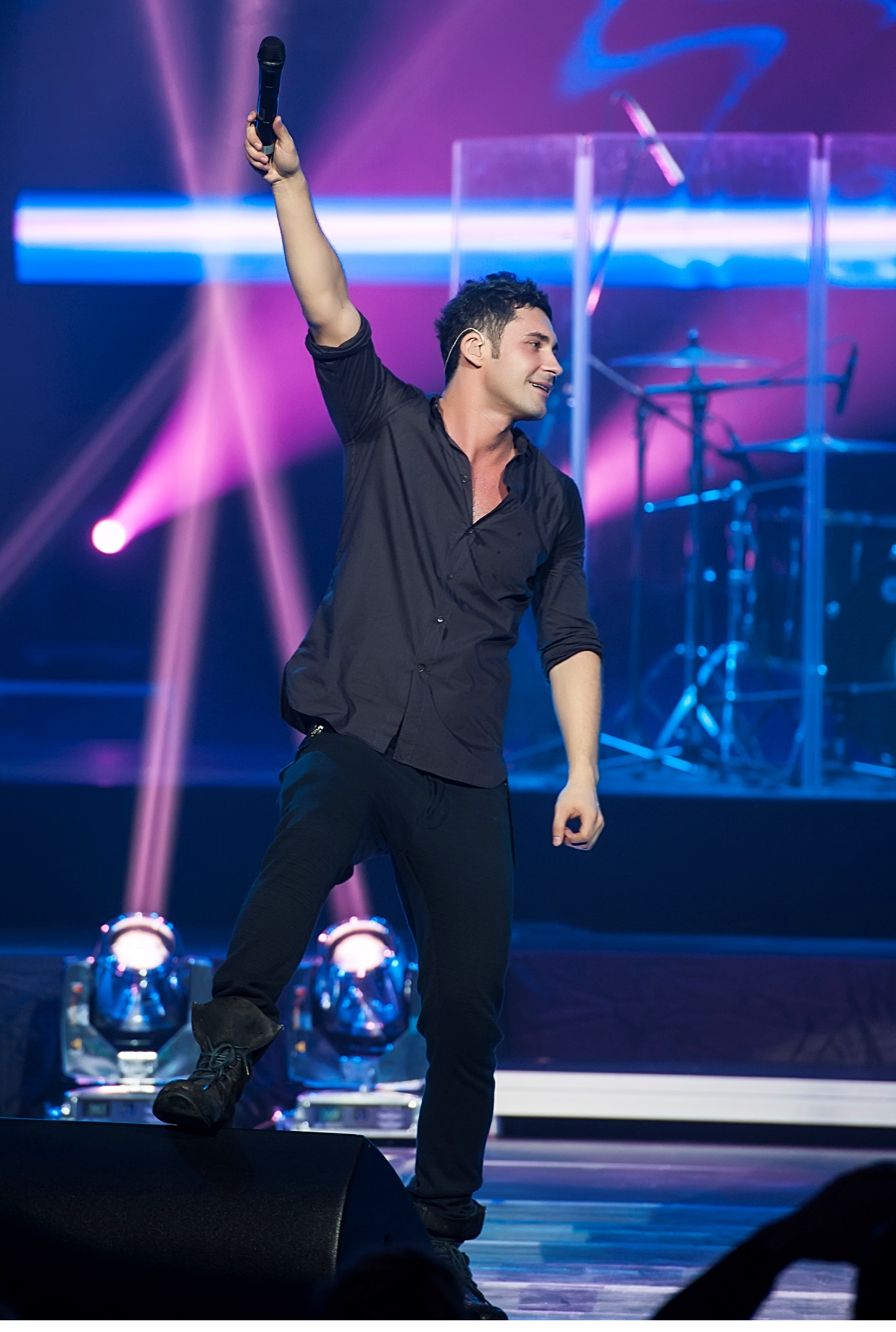
Balan in 2012

He released his second Russian single, «Лишь До Утра» (eng. tran. «Until The Morning») on 26 September 2011. The song was recorded in studios in several countries, including Romania, the U.K., Russia and the U.S. In an interview, Bălan explained that upon thinking the concept of the song, he had an immediate notion that the song would be best presented in the Russian language. The single reached number one position on the Russian digital sales chart. He wrote the concept for the song's music video himself and enlisted French director Steven Ada to direct the video. The singer selected Ada because he wanted a director with a very particular, photographic eye for composition and light, who could convey the natural beauty of the waking day and contrast it with the two lovers sharing their last morning together. The video was filmed in Corsica Island, with Bălan starring opposite Ioana Raicu. The video premiered on 25 October 2011.

In April 2012, Bălan released another Russian single, pop-rock song "Люби" (eng. tran. "To Love"). The song reached number one on the Top Hit Weekly Audience Choice, number thirteen on the Russian chart and number two on the Ukrainian chart. The music video for the song was directed by Alan Badoev and starred Russian theater and film actress Ekaterina Vilkova. Later that year, he was nominated for the best male singer award by the music channel Muz-TV. and was named as Russia's sexiest singer by online magazine Woman.ru at the RU.TV Russian music awards ceremony. He was also nominated for Best Singer and Best Song for "Лишь До Утра". On 1 December 2012, the singer won a Golden Gramophone award for the second year in a row for "Лишь До Утра". Bălan was also awarded The Red Star Awards (Премия «Красная Звезда») in nomination Best Songs of the Year for his single, which was one of the top twenty most popular songs of 2012 in Russia.

In November 2012, he announced that he was working on his latest album Freedom (Part 1) He recorded the album in several studios in the U.S., the U.K., Italy and Romania. The album was launched in the Arena Moscow Concert Hall as part of a solo concert and included "Chica Bomb", "Justify Sex", "Lepestkami Slöz" and "Freedom". The album became popular in Russia and was certified gold.

=== 2013–2021: Freedom, Part 2 ===
==== Lendo Calendo ====
In May 2013, Bălan released "Lendo Calendo", a bilingual single with lyrics in Spanish and English. The track featured Tany Vander and French rapper Brasco. He sang his part in Spanish, which he had studied in Barcelona. The words Lendo Calendo were coined by Bălan himself who thought of them as magic words like Abracadabra. The song topped the iTunes Chart and reached number one in Russia and also peaked the charts in Romania and other CIS countries. The music video of the song, directed by Alan Badoev, was released on 9 July 2013. The song received positive reviews and the singer received several awards for "Lendo Calendo". On 25 May, he was nominated for the best singer award at the annual Russian music awards RU.TV. Later he won the award for The Best Singer at the Real Musicbox awards ceremony.

On 30 November 2013, Bălan received his third Golden Gramophone award for the song "Люби".

In January 2014, Bălan began recording a new studio album, Freedom, Part 2 in London in the Abbey Road Studios, AIR Studios, RAK Studios, Strongroom Studios and Sarm Studios. He wrote the music and lyrics and produced all of the tracks on the album. The recordings featured the Symphony Orchestra of the British Musicians' Union, the London Community Gospel Choir, London Voices led by Terry Edwards and Ben Parry, as well as Massive Attack drummer Julien Brown, guitarist Seton Daunt, and percussionist Andy Duncan. Chris Elliott worked on the arrangement for the symphony orchestra.

==== "Домой" (Domoj) ====
The album's first single "Домой" was released in September 2014. In contrast to Dan's previous work, "Домой" was quite experimental, moving away from his typical style and appealing to an older audience. According to Dan, the track also differs from the other songs on the new album, which will have a more commercial sound.

==== “Funny Love” ====
In 2015, Bălan returned from his creative break to release another experimental single, “Funny Love”. The music video was directed by acclaimed Ukrainian director Alan Badoev, who has recorded hundreds of music videos, and several of Bălan's songs. The music video took a whole 4 months to film, involving 20 different scenes. 13 models and 16 dancers had in total 120 costumes and 300 kg of luggage. Badoev used “unusual graphics” and novel editing techniques in the video, and was impressed by Bălan's dedication to his music. The singer admitted he wanted to take his songs to a new level after Lendo Calendo, and worked more than any other on the sound design for Funny Love.

==== "Плачь" (Plač) ====
Bălan also released a version of his song “Cry Cry”, originally written for his unreleased rock album in 2006, with different, experimental and complex sound, and new Russian lyrics, differing somewhat from the English, to appeal to an Eastern European audience.

==== “Hold on Love” ====
In 2017, Bălan decided to return from his three-year creative break, in which he had been working on experimental music styles, to return with a more commercial sounding single which would not be featured on Freedom, Part 2. Bălan felt that before releasing the new album he should return to the stage with a dance hit such as “Hold on Love”. To that end, he was invited performed the song at the popular M1 (Ukraine) Music Awards in 2017. The music video, Bălan's fifth collaboration with Ukrainian director Alan Badoev was described by Badoev as a dark and mysterious David Fincher-style clip. Badoev decided on a theme of “do not be afraid of what is inside of you”, casting Bălan as a Pastor tempted by his desires, and filmed in a district of Los Angeles. The director's team had to close off an entire city block to complete filming.

==== "Наше Лето" (Naše Leto) with Vera Brezhneva ====
Dan Bălan decided to re-unite O-Zone in 2017 to have 2 concerts on 9 May 2017 in Chisinau and Bucharest.

In March 2018, Dan Bălan released a new single called "Allegro Ventigo", featuring Matteo. Successful in the likes of Romania, Ukraine, Russia, and Bulgaria, there was much talk around the language the lyrics are written in. Bălan joked in an interview that this is "Old Moldavian", but the settled view is that the lyrics are written in a fictional language that combines elements of Spanish, Italian, Greek and Romanian. On 12 September 2018, Dan Bălan released a new single called "Numa Numa 2" in association with Marley Waters. After a few days, the song reached #1 in the Japan Charts and was a great success. He then had a small show/concert in Japan singing Numa Numa 2.

In 2019, Dan Bălan created an audio and video production company Monarda Studios, that deals with managing and developing music artists and internet celebrities. The company's offices are located in Kyiv, Ukraine, and Bucharest, Romania.

== Discography ==
=== Studio albums ===
Title	Album details
The Power of Shower (as Crazy Loop)	Released: 2 December 2007; Label: MediaPro; Format: CD, digital download
Crazy Loop Mix	Released: 1 December 2009; Label: Orange S.A.; Format: CD
Freedom, Part 1	Released: 13 December 2012; Label: Gala; Format: CD, digital download
Freedom, Part 2	Released: 20 April 2021; Label: Monarda; Format: Digital download

=== Singles ===
Single	Year	Peak chart positions									Album
Single	Year	RUS	AUT	CZR	DEN	GER	GRE	JPN	SCO	UK	Album
"De la mine"	1998	—	—	—	—	—	—	—	—	—	Non-album single
"Mm-ma-ma" (as Crazy Loop)	2007	143	49	—	—	18	—	—	—	—	The Power of Shower / Crazy Loop Mix / Freedom, Part 1
"Johanna (Shut Up!)" (as Crazy Loop)	2007	—	—	—	—	—	—	—	—	—	The Power of Shower / Crazy Loop Mix
"Despre tine cânt"	2008	—	—	—	—	—	—	—	—	—	Crazy Loop Mix / Freedom, Part 1
"Chica Bomb"	2009	1	64	6	36	37	3	—	32	44	Crazy Loop Mix / Freedom, Part 1
"Justify Sex"	2010	1	—	—	—	—	—	—	—	—	Freedom, Part 1
"Лепестками слез" (featuring Vera Brezhneva)	2010	1	—	—	—	—	—	—	—	—	Freedom, Part 1
"Freedom"	2011	2	—	—	—	—	—	—	—	—	Freedom, Part 1
"Лишь до утра"	2011	2	—	—	—	—	—	—	—	—	Freedom, Part 1
"Люби"	2012	13	—	—	—	—	—	—	—	—	Freedom, Part 1
"Не любя"	2012	10	—	—	—	—	—	—	—	—	Freedom, Part 1
"Lendo Calendo" (featuring Tany Vander and Brasco)	2013	3	—	—	—	—	—	—	—	—	Freedom, Part 2
"Домой"	2014	50	—	—	—	—	—	—	—	—	Freedom, Part 2
"Funny Love"	2015	—	—	—	—	—	—	—	—	—	Freedom, Part 2
"Плачь"	2015	—	—	—	—	—	—	—	—	—	Freedom, Part 2
"Мало малины" (with Romanovskaya)	2016	154	—	—	—	—	—	—	—	—	Freedom, Part 2
"Hold On Love"	2017	81	—	—	—	—	—	—	—	—	Freedom, Part 2
"Наше Лето" (with Вера Брежнева)	2017	57	—	—	—	—	—	—	—	—	Freedom, Part 2
"Allegro Ventigo" (featuring Matteo)	2018	—	—	—	—	—	—	—	—	—	Freedom, Part 2
"Numa Numa 2" (featuring Marley Waters)	2018	81	—	—	—	—	—	64	—	—	Freedom, Part 2
"Balzam" (with Lusia Chebotina)	2019	—	—	—	—	—	—	—	—	—	Freedom, Part 2
"Домой" (with Tina Karol)	2019	—	—	—	—	—	—	—	—	—	Freedom, Part 2
"Помнишь" (with Tina Karol)	2020	—	—	—	—	—	—	—	—	—	Freedom, Part 2
"Все пробачати" (with Oksana Mukha)	2020	—	—	—	—	—	—	—	—	—	Freedom, Part 2
"Дышат о любви" (with Indira Yedilbayeva)	2020	—	—	—	—	—	—	—	—	—	Non-album singles
"любовь как в песнях"	2021	—	—	—	—	—	—	—	—	—	Non-album singles
"—" denotes a recording that did not chart or was not released in that territory.

== Videography ==
2007	"Crazy Loop (Mm-ma-ma)"	Crazy Loop	Marc Klasfeld	The Power of Shower
2008	"Johanna (Shut Up!)"	Crazy Loop	Marc Klasfeld	The Power of Shower
2008	"Despre Tine Cânt (Part 2)"	Dan Bălan	Greg Olive	The Power of Shower
2009	"Chica Bomb"	Dan Bălan	Hype Williams	Crazy Loop Mix
2010	"Justify Sex"	Dan Bălan	Jesse Dylan	Freedom (Part 1)
2010	"Лепестками слёз"	Dan Bălan feat Vera Brezhneva	Serghei Solodki	Freedom (Part 1)
2011	"Freedom"	Dan Bălan	Pavel Hudiakov	Freedom (Part 1)
2011	"Лишь до утра"	Dan Bălan	Steven ADA	Freedom (Part 1)
2012	"Люби"	Dan Bălan	Alan Badoev	Freedom (Part 1)
2013	"Lendo Calendo"	Dan Bălan feat Tany Vander & Brasco	Alan Badoev	Single
2015	"Funny Love"	Dan Bălan	Alan Badoev	Single
2015	"Плачь"	Dan Bălan	Alan Badoev	Single
2017	"Hold on Love"	Dan Bălan	Alan Badoev	Single
2017	"Наше Лето"	Dan Bălan & Vera Brezhneva	Sergey Solodkiy	Single
2018	"Allegro Ventigo"	Dan Bălan feat. Matteo	Sergey Solodkiy	Single
2018	"Numa Numa 2"	Dan Bălan feat. Marley Waters	Sergey Solodkiy	Single
2019	"Dragostea Din Tei"	Dan Bălan & Katerina Begu	The Voice Ukraine, season 9	Single (with new arr.)
2019	"Balzam (feat. Lusia Chebotina)"	Dan Bălan	Sergey Solodkiy/Dan Bălan	Single
2020	"#ВСЕПРОБАЧАТИ (feat.Oksana Mukha)"	Dan Bălan	Dan Bălan	Single
2021	"Дышат о любви"	Dan Bălan & INDI	Dan Bălan	Single
2021	"Любовь как в песнях"	Dan Bălan	Dan Bălan	Single
2023	"Love Maria"	Crazy Loop	Dan Bălan	Single

== Awards and nominations ==
Year	Recipient	Category	Award	Nomination	Result
2002	O-Zone	MTV Romania Music Awards	Best Video	"Numai Tu"	Won
2003	O-Zone	MTV Romania Music Awards	Best Song	"Despre Tine"	Won
2003	O-Zone	MTV Romania Music Awards	Best Dance	"Despre Tine"	Won
2003	O-Zone	MTV Europe Music Awards	Best Romanian Act	O-Zone	Nominated
2004	O-Zone	MTV Romania Music Awards	Best Dance	"Dragostea din Tei"	Won
2004	O-Zone	MTV Europe Music Awards	Best Romanian Act	O-Zone	Nominated
2005	O-Zone	Echo Awards	Single of the year	"Dragostea din tei"	Won
2008	Crazy Loop	MTV Europe Music Awards	Best Romanian Act	Crazy Loop	Nominated
2010	Dan Bălan	MTV Europe Music Awards	Best Romanian Act	Dan Bălan	Nominated
2011	Dan Bălan feat Vera Brezhneva	Golden Gramophone Award	Golden Gramophone	"Лепестками слёз"	Won
2011	Dan Bălan feat Vera Brezhneva	RU TV Awards	Best Duo	"Лепестками слёз"	Nominated
2012	Dan Bălan	RU TV Awards	Sexiest male singer	Dan Bălan	Won
2012	Dan Bălan	RU TV Awards	Best Song	"Лишь до утра"	Nominated
2012	Dan Bălan	RU TV Awards	Best male artist	Dan Bălan	Nominated
2012	Dan Bălan	Golden Gramophone Award	Golden Gramophone	"Лишь до утра"	Won
2013	Dan Bălan	Krasnaya Zvezda	Best Song	"Лишь до утра"	Won
2013	Dan Bălan	RU TV Awards	Best male artist	Dan Bălan	Nominated
2013	Dan Bălan	Musicbox Awards	Best male artist	Dan Bălan	Won
2013	Dan Bălan	Golden Gramophone Award	Golden Gramophone	"Люби"	Won

Other honours

- Honorary title "Maestru în Artă" (Master of Arts) - 17 November 2009, awarded by the then Interim President of Moldova Mihai Ghimpu

== See also ==
- List of music released by Moldovan artists that has charted in major music markets
