= Hit Machine (TV program) =

French music chart television series

- Presented by: Ophelie Winter (1994-1995); Yves Noël (1994-1995); Charly and Lulu (1995-2008); Pierre Matthieu (2008-2009)
- Country of origin: France

Production
- Running time: 30 minutes (1994-1996); 60 minutes (1995-2008); 30 minutes (2008-2009); 5 minutes (2009); 45 minutes (2012-2013)
- Production company: Studio 89 Productions

Original release
- Network: M6
- Release: 1 October 1994 – 1 May 2009

Hit Machine is a defunct music chart television programme which ran in France from 1 October 1994 until 1 May 2009 through M6. The show was initially hosted by Ophélie Winter and Yves Noël until June 1995, before being replaced by Charly Nestor and Jean-Marc Lubin (known collectively as Charly and Lulu). They presented the show for several seasons until being replaced by Pierre Matthieu in September 2008 following a ratings decline, until its end in 2009. It aired music videos and performances of some of the week's best-selling popular music records.

In 2012, a spin-off titled Génération Hit Machine was aired on W9, showing the show's best moments.
