= Gardianul =

Former Romanian daily newspaper

Gardianul ("The Guardian") was a Romanian daily newspaper published in Bucharest. It claimed to have had an anti-corruption stance, investigating organized crime and high-level corruption.

The newspaper was founded in 2002 by Şerban Roibu, the son of a Social Democratic Party senator and therefore is accused of bias in favour of the Social Democratic Party, although it did publish articles which are critical of Social Democrat members being investigated for corruption. It eventually was sold to "Petrom Service" a company owned by the labour union of Petrom, but it kept its editorial stance. It was one of the newspapers involved in the 'governmental advertising funds for political subversion' scandal of 2004 (see Adrian Năstase).

Overall the newspaper had a low readership and circulation for a national newspaper - at its peak distributing no more than 10.000 copies daily, out of which less than 6.000 paid for. Publishing of the newspaper ceased on 1 January 2010, the editorial board claiming that Gardianul would switch to a web-only new-media format. However, by the end of January 2010, Gardianul's website was also shut down.
