= O-Zone =

Moldovan Eurodance group and boy band

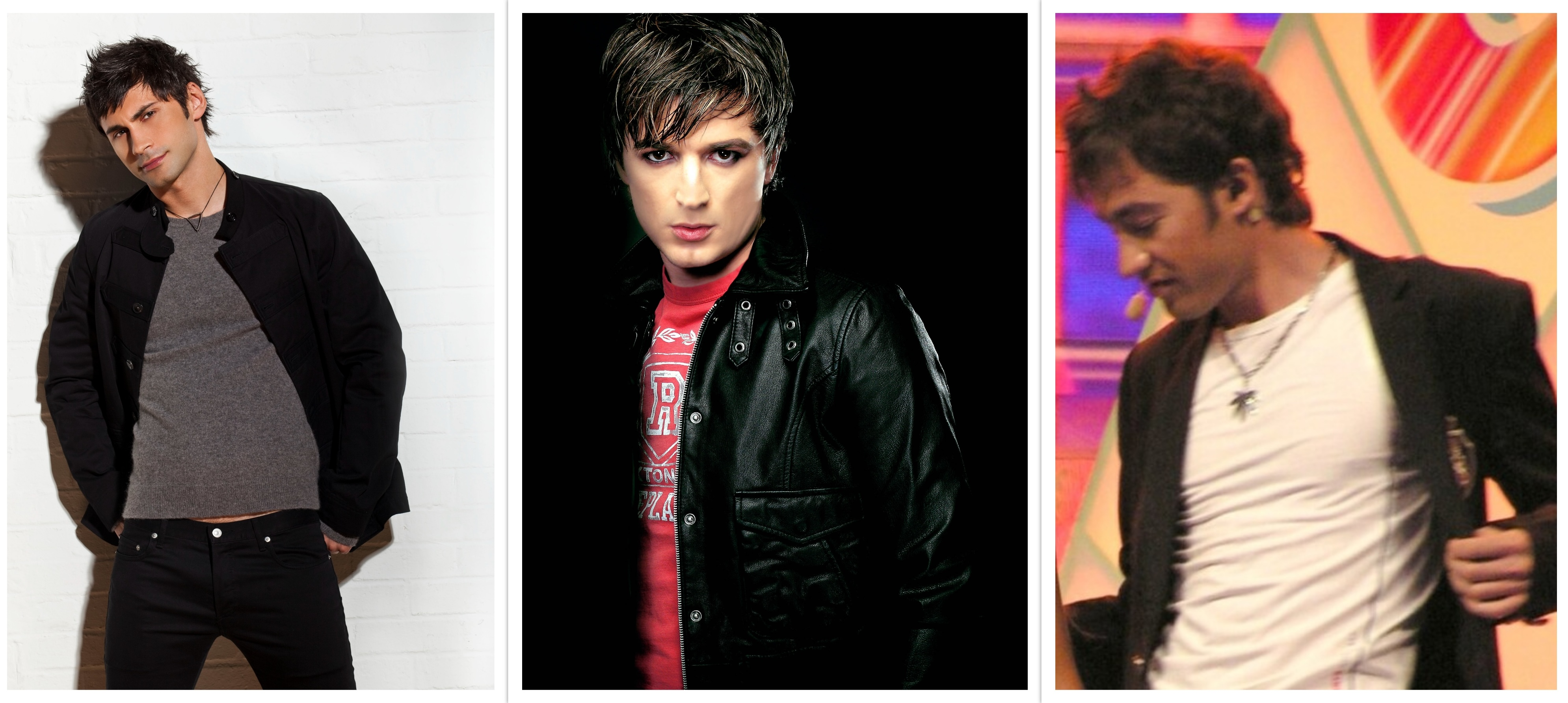
- Founders and original members of O-Zone; From left to right: Dan Balan, Radu Sîrbu, Arsenie Todiraș

Background information
- Origin: Chișinău, Moldova
- Genres: Eurodance; pop; EDM
- Years active: 1999–2005; 2017–2019; 2024–present
- Labels: Cat Music; Ultra; Avex; Time
- Past members: Arsenie Todiraș; Dan Balan; Petru Jelihovschi; Radu Sîrbu
- Website: artists.universal-music.de/ozone

O-Zone are a Moldovan Eurodance group and boy band produced by Dan Balan; originating in 1999 as a duo, which consisted of Balan and Petru Jelihovschi, before the latter's departure. Their official trio line-up in 1999 consisted of Dan Balan, Radu Sîrbu and Arsenie Todiraș.

The group became the first Moldovan act to gain global popularity with their smash hit single "Dragostea din tei" and their subsequent album DiscO-Zone, which was released in 2003, before disbanding the following year. "Dragostea din tei" remains their signature song and biggest hit single to date.

The group members have since focused on their solo careers. The band occasionally reunited for concerts in 2017 (Chișinău, Moldova; Bucharest, Romania) and 2019 (Bucharest, Romania). In 2024, it was announced that O-Zone would perform a summer tour, but as a tribute band consisting of Arsenie as the only singer, accompanied by two dancers. Worldwide, O-Zone have sold over 12 million copies of "Dragostea din tei" and over 2.5 million copies of its parent album DiscO-Zone.

== History ==
=== 1999–2001: Formation and early years ===
O-Zone first formed as a duo of Dan Bălan and Petru Jelihovschi in 1999. They released their first album, Dar, Unde Ești..., in 1999. However, Jelihovschi had not intended to make music his career, so he split from Bălan. Undaunted, Bălan held open auditions for new band members. At one such audition, he met Arsenie "Arsenium" Todiraș, who eventually won over the initially skeptical Bălan with his version of Elvis Presley's "Love Me Tender". Bălan and Todiraș would have proceeded as a duo act until Bălan received a call from Radu Sîrbu, who wanted a chance to audition for the group. Despite Sîrbu having missed the initial auditions, Bălan agreed, and after a successful audition, Sîrbu joined O-Zone, officially making the group a trio.

=== 2002–2004: Rise to success ===
In 2002, O-Zone moved from Moldova to Bucharest, Romania, hoping to gain more recognition. There, the group became an instant hit band with their upbeat song "Despre Tine" ("About You"), which held the top position on the Romanian Top 100 chart for three weeks in February 2003. Their second hit, which brought them worldwide attention, was "Dragostea din tei", translated roughly as "Love in the Linden Trees". It quickly became popular in Romania, where it also topped the Romanian singles chart for four weeks in September 2003, but faded from popularity by the end of 2003. However, the song gained popularity in Italy when the little-known duo Haiducii released a cover of "Dragostea Din Tei", which topped the Italian pop charts. Arsenie Todiraș later said that at the time that, while not illegal, Haiducii's cover felt like a betrayal because the group had not asked permission to make a cover. However, the cover's success led to curiosity about the original artist, and led to Time Records, an Italian record label, offering O-Zone a one-year contract. Soon after the song's release in Italy, it was also released in various other countries in Europe under Polydor Records and became an instant hit.

"Dragostea Din Tei" topped the singles charts of nearly a dozen European countries in 2004. It reached the top-10 in many other countries, including in the United Kingdom, where it reached number 3 on the singles chart. The re-release of "Despre Tine" in 2004 from the same album had similar success across Europe.

In contrast to their multi-platinum status in Europe, O-Zone never entered the Billboard Hot 100 singles chart in the United States, although it did reach the 14th position on the Hot Dance Airplay chart. The viral video "Numa Numa Dance" by interneter Gary Brolsma helped to boost awareness of "Dragostea Din Tei" in the U.S. In the video Brolsma was seen lip-syncing to the song while sitting in a chair and dancing with only his arms and hands, but, while the song received moderate to major airplay, most Americans knew it simply as the "Numa Numa Song" and never knew the name of the original song or the group that performed it. "Dragostea din tei" was sampled in the song "Live Your Life" by T.I. and Rihanna, which topped the Billboard Hot 100 in late 2008.

=== 2005: O-Zone split up ===
On 13 January 2005, while still very popular, the members of O-Zone announced their disbandment, citing personal reasons. Their last European concert was held at the 2005 Golden Stag Festival in Romania.

Also in 2005, Japanese music label Avex Trax gained distribution rights for O-Zone music in Japan and released the album DiscO-Zone in August 2005 in the country. The album, which features the song "Dragostea Din Tei", became immensely successful in Japan. Topping the Oricon albums charts for two consecutive weeks, it reached over 800,000 sales in 2005 alone and became the 12th-most popular album of 2005, partially because the album was re-released twice by Avex Trax. DiscO-Zone ended up charting for over a year on the Oricon weekly albums chart and sold over one million copies overall. In 2006, O-Zone won the Best Foreign Act award at the 2006 Japan Gold Disc Awards, as well as a special prize at the 47th Japan Record Awards.

=== 2017–2024: Occasional reunions and tribute band ===
On 5 May 2017, Dan Bălan, Radu Sîrbu and Arsenie Todiraş announced that O-Zone would be reforming for two concerts. O-Zone re-united for Europe Day on 9 May 2017. One of concerts was held in Chișinău and the other took place on the same day in Bucharest.

On 17 December 2019, Dan Bălan, Radu Sîrbu and Arsenie Todiraş announced that O-Zone would be performing for one concert, which took place on New Year's Eve 2019 in Bucharest as part of performances by stars of the 90s and 00s called Revelion 2020 Disco Night Fever. After the event, all three returned to their projects again. The exception was the collaboration of Radu and Arsenie for the song "Lay Down".

In 2024, O-Zone announced a summer tour in Europe, but this time as a tribute band, consisting of Arsenie from the original group and two dancers.

== Discography ==
=== Studio albums ===
List of studio albums, with selected chart positions, sales and certifications
Title	Album details	Peak chart positions										Sales	Certifications
Title	Album details	AUT	FIN	FRA	GER	JPN	NLD	NOR	POR	SPA	SWI	Sales	Certifications
Dar, unde eşti...	Released: 2000; Label: Music Master; Format: Cassette, CD	—	—	—	—	—	—	—	—	—	—		
Number 1	Released: 2002; Label: Cat Music; Format: Cassette, CD, digital download	—	—	—	—	—	—	—	—	—	—		
DiscO-Zone	Released: 2003; Label: Cat Music; Format: Cassette, CD, digital download	15	3	15	16	1	41	3	1	54	7	WW: 2,500,000; FIN: 26,832; JPN: 900,000	AFP: Platinum; IFPI FIN: Gold; IFPI SWI: Gold; PROMUSICAE: Gold; RIAJ: 3× Platinum; SNEP: Gold; UPFR: Gold
"—" denotes an album that did not chart or was not released in that territory.

=== Singles ===
List of singles, with selected chart positions, sales, and certifications
Title	Year	Peak chart positions										Sales	Certifications	Album
Title	Year	FRA	GER	ITA	JPN	NLD	NOR	ROM	SPA	UK	US	Sales	Certifications	Album
"De la mine"	1999	—	—	—	—	—	―	—	—	—	—			Dar, Unde Ești...
"Numai tu"	2002	—	—	—	—	—	―	—	—	—	—			Number 1
"Despre tine"	2002	2	9	8	―	27	1	1	4	—	—		ROM: 2× Gold; SNEP: Gold	Number 1 and DiscO-Zone
"Dragostea din tei"	2003	1	1	17	72	1	1	1	1	3	— (Note: "Dragostea din tei" did not chart on the Billboard Hot 100, but "Ma Ya Hi", an English-language version featuring Lucas Prata, reached number 16 on the magazine's Bubbling Under Hot 100 chart.)	WW: 12,000,000; FRA: 1,170,000; ROM: 250,000	BPI: Platinum; BVMI: 2× Platinum; FIMI: Gold; NVPI: Platinum; PROMUSICAE: Gold; RIAA: Gold; RIAJ: 4× Million (Note: This reflects the highest certification awarded to "Dragostea din tei" in Japan, which denotes ringtone sales. The song was further certified platinum and gold in other formats.); SNEP: Diamond	DiscO-Zone
"De ce plâng chitarele"	2004	17	—	—	—	—	―	3	—	—	—			DiscO-Zone
"—" denotes a recording that did not chart or was not released in that territory.

== See also ==
- List of music released by Moldovan artists that has charted in major music markets
