= List of largest recorded music markets =

Top 10 largest recorded music markets as of 2025

The world's largest recorded music markets are listed annually by the International Federation of the Phonographic Industry (IFPI). The ranking is based on the retail value (rather than units) each market generates per year; retail value generated by each market varies from year to year. As all financial data is given in US dollars, annual rates of change for all countries other than the United States are heavily influenced by exchange rate fluctuations, as well as by actual changes in revenue in local currency terms.

The information presented on this page only accounts for revenue generated from the recorded music industry (recorded music and auxiliary revenues generated by these recordings), and is not reflective of the entirety of the music industry, including sectors such as publishing, live music, etc.

The United States has remained the biggest market for recorded music in IFPI history, except in 2010 when Japan topped the list. Japan has always stayed within the top two, while the United Kingdom, France, Germany, and Canada have consistently appeared among the top ten music markets throughout IFPI history. Other countries historically having appeared in the top ten include Australia, Italy, Brazil, South Korea, Spain, the Netherlands, China, Mexico, and Russia.

== IFPI annual data ==
=== 2020–2025 ===
List of the world's top-ten music markets during the first half of the 2020s
| Country | 2020 | | 2021 | | 2022 | | 2023 | | 2024 | | 2025 | |
| Country | Rank | Value ($ million) | Rank | Value ($ million) | Rank | Value ($ million) | Rank | Value ($ million) | Rank | Value ($ million) | Rank | Value ($ million) |
|---|---|---|---|---|---|---|---|---|---|---|---|---|
| United States | 1 | n/a | 1 | n/a | 1 | n/a | 1 | n/a | 1 | n/a | 1 | n/a |
| Japan | 2 | n/a | 2 | n/a | 2 | n/a | 2 | n/a | 2 | n/a | 2 | n/a |
| United Kingdom | 3 | n/a | 3 | n/a | 3 | n/a | 3 | n/a | 3 | n/a | 3 | n/a |
| Germany | 4 | n/a | 4 | n/a | 4 | n/a | 4 | n/a | 4 | n/a | 5 ▼ | n/a |
| France | 5 | n/a | 5 | n/a | 6 ▼ | n/a | 6 | n/a | 6 | n/a | 6 | n/a |
| South Korea | 6 | n/a | 7 ▼ | n/a | 7 | n/a | 7 | n/a | 7 | n/a | 7 | n/a |
| China | 7 | n/a | 6 ▲ | n/a | 5 ▲ | n/a | 5 | n/a | 5 | n/a | 4 ▲ | n/a |
| Canada | 8 | n/a | 8 | n/a | 8 | n/a | 8 | n/a | 8 | n/a | 8 | n/a |
| Australia | 9 | n/a | 9 | n/a | 10 ▼ | n/a | 10 | n/a | Out | | Out | |
| Netherlands | 10 ▲ | n/a | Out | | Out | | Out | | Out | | Out | |
| Italy | Out | | 10 ▲ | n/a | Out | | Out | | Out | | Out | |
| Brazil | Out | | Out | | 9 ▲ | n/a | 9 | n/a | 9 | n/a | 9 | n/a |
| Mexico | Out | | Out | | Out | | Out | | 10 ▲ | n/a | 10 | n/a |

=== 2015–2019 ===
List of the world's top-ten music markets during the second half of the 2010s
| Country | 2015 | | 2016 | | 2017 | | 2018 | | 2019 | |
| Country | Rank | Value ($ million) | Rank | Value ($ million) | Rank | Value ($ million) | Rank | Value ($ million) | Rank | Value ($ million) |
|---|---|---|---|---|---|---|---|---|---|---|
| United States | 1 | 4,997.3 | 1 | 5,318.2 | 1 | 5,916.1 | 1 | n/a | 1 | n/a |
| Japan | 2 | 2,446.7 | 2 | 2,745.9 | 2 | 2,727.5 | 2 | n/a | 2 | n/a |
| United Kingdom | 3 ▲ | 1,354.0 | 3 | 1,251.1 | 4 ▼ | 1,310.7 | 3 ▲ | n/a | 3 | n/a |
| Germany | 4 ▼ | 1,309.9 | 4 | 1,212.0 | 3 ▲ | 1,323.1 | 4 ▼ | n/a | 4 | n/a |
| France | 5 | 809.1 | 5 | 849.5 | 5 | 925.1 | 5 | n/a | 5 | n/a |
| Australia | 6 | 342.8 | 7 ▼ | 357.2 | 8 ▼ | 412.9 | 8 | n/a | 9 ▼ | n/a |
| Canada | 7 | 335.8 | 6 ▲ | 367.9 | 7 ▼ | 437.2 | 9 ▼ | n/a | 8 ▲ | n/a |
| South Korea | 8 | 281.3 | 8 | 330.1 | 6 ▲ | 494.4 | 6 | n/a | 6 | n/a |
| Italy | 9 ▲ | 265.5 | 9 | 263.7 | Out | | Out | | Out | |
| Brazil | 10 ▼ | 247.0 | Out | | 9 ▲ | 295.8 | 10 ▼ | n/a | 10 | n/a |
| Netherlands | Out | | 10 ▲ | 243.3 | Out | | Out | | Out | |
| China | Out | | Out | | 10 ▲ | 292.3 | 7 ▲ | n/a | 7 | n/a |

=== 2010–2014 ===
List of the world's top-ten music markets during the first half of the 2010s
| Country | 2010 | | 2011 | | 2012 | | 2013 | | 2014 | |
| Country | Rank | Value ($ million) | Rank | Value ($ million) | Rank | Value ($ million) | Rank | Value ($ million) | Rank | Value ($ million) |
|---|---|---|---|---|---|---|---|---|---|---|
| Japan | 1 ▲ | 4,096.9 | 2 ▼ | 4,087.7 | 2 | 4,422.0 | 2 | 3,012.0 | 2 | 2,627.9 |
| United States | 2 ▼ | 3,635.2 | 1 ▲ | 4,372.9 | 1 | 4,481.8 | 1 | 4,473.5 | 1 | 4,898.3 |
| Germany | 3 | 1,713.6 | 3 | 1,473.7 | 4 ▼ | 1,297.9 | 3 ▲ | 1,365.1 | 3 | 1,404.8 |
| United Kingdom | 4 | 1,388.1 | 4 | 1,433.7 | 3 ▲ | 1,325.8 | 4 ▼ | 1,303.5 | 4 | 1,334.6 |
| France | 5 | 999.6 | 5 | 1,002.2 | 5 | 907.6 | 5 | 956.2 | 5 | 842.8 |
| Australia | 6 | 408 | 6 | 475.2 | 6 | 507.4 | 6 | 430.8 | 6 | 376.1 |
| Canada | 7 | 343.2 | 7 | 434.0 | 7 | 453.5 | 7 | 424.1 | 7 | 342.5 |
| Italy | 8 ▲ | 275.4 | 9 ▼ | 239.9 | 9 | 217.5 | 8 ▲ | 238.8 | 10 ▼ | 235.2 |
| Netherlands | 9 ▼ | 270.2 | 8 ▲ | 240.2 | 10 ▼ | 216.3 | Out | | Out | |
| Brazil | 10 ▲ | 258.7 | 10 | 262.6 | 8 ▲ | 257.2 | 9 ▼ | 227.9 | 9 | 246.5 |
| South Korea | Out | | Out | | Out | | 10 ▲ | 211.3 | 8 ▲ | 265.8 |

=== 2005–2009 ===
In 2006, Russia entered the top ten for the first time, staying for three years, with the highest rank at number 9 in both 2007 and 2008.

List of the world's top-ten music markets during the second half of the 2000s
| Country | 2005 | | 2006 | | 2007 | | 2008 | | 2009 | |
| Country | Rank | Value ($ million) | Rank | Value ($ million) | Rank | Value ($ million) | Rank | Value ($ million) | Rank | Value ($ million) |
|---|---|---|---|---|---|---|---|---|---|---|
| United States | 1 | 11,195 | 1 | 9,651.4 | 1 | 7,985.6 | 1 | 5,977.4 | 1 | 4,562 |
| Japan | 2 | 4,883.5 | 2 | 4,495.2 | 2 | 4,174.5 | 2 | 5,171.1 | 2 | 4,244.5 |
| United Kingdom | 3 | 3,330.4 | 3 | 3,051.1 | 3 | 2,696.4 | 4 ▼ | 2,274.9 | 4 | 1,730.5 |
| Germany | 4 | 2,146.4 | 4 | 2,029.1 | 4 | 2,142.2 | 3 ▲ | 2,370 | 3 | 1,945.8 |
| France | 5 | 1,940.3 | 5 | 1,661.7 | 5 | 1,471 | 5 | 1,342.5 | 5 | 1,157.5 |
| Canada | 6 ▲ | 708.3 | 6 | 667.8 | 7 ▼ | 561.8 | 7 | 530 | 7 | 401.6 |
| Italy | 7 ▲ | 639.8 | 8 ▼ | 556.9 | 8 | 493.3 | 8 | 427 | 9 ▼ | 293.8 |
| Australia | 8 ▼ | 637.7 | 7 ▲ | 583.6 | 6 ▲ | 564.8 | 6 | 555.3 | 6 | 456.2 |
| Spain | 9 | 547.1 | 9 | 464.8 | Out | | 10 ▲ | 374.3 | 10 | 266.8 |
| Netherlands | 10 | 423.1 | Out | | 10 ▲ | 385 | Out | | 8 ▲ | 340.6 |
| Russia | Out | | 10 ▲ | 405 | 9 ▲ | 418.8 | 9 | 395.2 | Out | |

=== 2000–2004 ===
List of the world's top-ten music markets during the first half of the 2000s
| Country | 2000 | | 2001 | | 2002 | | 2003 | | 2004 | |
| Country | Rank | Value ($ million) | Rank | Value ($ million) | Rank | Value ($ million) | Rank | Value ($ million) | Rank | Value ($ million) |
|---|---|---|---|---|---|---|---|---|---|---|
| United States | 1 | 14,042.0 | 1 | 13,411 | 1 | 12,325.7 | 1 | 11,847.9 | 1 | 12,153.4 |
| Japan | 2 | 6,496.9 | 2 | 5,253 | 2 | 4,593.3 | 2 | 4,909.7 | 2 | 5,167.8 |
| United Kingdom | 3 | 2,828.7 | 3 | 2,808 | 3 | 2,859.4 | 3 | 3,215.7 | 3 | 3,508.7 |
| Germany | 4 | 2,420.6 | 4 | 2,128 | 5 ▼ | 1,988.0 | 5 | 2,022.1 | 4 ▲ | 2,149 |
| France | 5 | 1,694.7 | 5 | 1,828 | 4 ▲ | 1,989.7 | 4 | 2,114.7 | 5 ▼ | 1,979.3 |
| Canada | 6 | 819.3 | 6 | 659 | 6 | 587.9 | 6 | 676 | 7 ▼ | 693.8 |
| Brazil | 7 | 724.7 | Out | | Out | | Out | | Out | |
| Mexico | 8 ▲ | 665.9 | 8 | 565 | 10 ▼ | 445.5 | Out | | Out | |
| Spain | 9 ▼ | 562.9 | 7 ▲ | 613 | 8 ▼ | 542.3 | 9 ▼ | 595.9 | 9 | 572.8 |
| Australia | 10 ▼ | 561.3 | 10 | 522 | 9 ▲ | 499.9 | 7 ▲ | 673.8 | 6 ▲ | 716.7 |
| Italy | Out | | 9 ▲ | 524 | 7 ▲ | 554.7 | 8 ▼ | 644.6 | 8 | 652.5 |
| Netherlands | Out | | Out | | Out | | 10 ▲ | 498.8 | 10 | 507.7 |

=== 1995–1999 ===
This period saw an all-time peak of Brazil's music industry, reaching retail sales of $1.4 billion in 1996 (equivalent to $2.87 billion in 2025). In 1998, the UK surpassed Germany for the first time as the world's third largest music market.

List of the world's top-ten music markets during the second half of the 1990s
| Country | 1995 | | 1996 | | 1997 | | 1998 | | 1999 | |
| Country | Rank | Value ($ million) | Rank | Value ($ million) | Rank | Value ($ million) | Rank | Value ($ million) | Rank | Value ($ million) |
|---|---|---|---|---|---|---|---|---|---|---|
| United States | 1 | 12,100 | 1 | 12,300 | 1 | 11,906.0 | 1 | 13,193.4 | 1 | n/a |
| Japan | 2 | 7,500 | 2 | 6,800 | 2 | 6,261.7 | 2 | 6,521.0 | 2 | n/a |
| Germany | 3 | 3,200 | 3 | 3,200 | 3 | 2,836.8 | 4 ▼ | 2,832.5 | 4 | n/a |
| United Kingdom | 4 | 2,500 | 4 | 2,700 | 4 | 2,729.7 | 3 ▲ | 2,855.6 | 3 | n/a |
| France | 5 | 2,300 | 5 | 2,300 | 5 | 2,199.5 | 5 | 2,134.8 | 5 | n/a |
| Brazil | Unavailable | | 6 | 1,400 | 6 | 1,199.1 | 6 | 1,055.7 | 7 ▼ | n/a |
| Canada | Unavailable | | 7 | 912 | 7 | 977.5 | 7 | 969.3 | 6 ▲ | n/a |
| Australia | Unavailable | | 8 | 815 | 8 | 739.1 | 9 ▼ | 606.7 | 8 ▲ | n/a |
| Netherlands | n/a | 716.5 | 9 | 660 | 9 | 600.1 | Out | | Out | |
| Italy | n/a | 582.7 | 10 | 637 | Out | | 10 ▲ | 597.7 | Out | |
| Spain | n/a | 557.3 | Out | | 10 ▲ | 599.9 | 8 ▲ | 680.8 | 9 ▼ | n/a |
| Mexico | Unavailable | | Out | | Out | | Out | | 10 ▲ | n/a |

=== 1990–1994 ===
List of the world's top-ten music markets during the first half of the 1990s
| Country | 1990 | | 1991 | | 1992 | | 1993 | | 1994 | |
| Country | Rank | Value ($ million) | Rank | Value ($ million) | Rank | Value ($ million) | Rank | Value ($ million) | Rank | Value ($ million) |
|---|---|---|---|---|---|---|---|---|---|---|
| United States | 1 | 7,541.1 | Unavailable | | 1 | 8,866.6 | 1 | 9,833.1 | 1 | 11,836.9 |
| Japan | 2 | 2,981.8 | Unavailable | | 2 | 4,328.5 | 2 | 5,082.4 | 2 | 5,933.4 |
| Germany | 3 | 2,273.9 | Unavailable | | 3 | 2,636.9 | 3 | 2,690.7 | 3 | 2,876.5 |
| United Kingdom | 4 | 2,117.5 | Unavailable | | 4 | 1,998.2 | 4 | 1,976.0 | 4 | 2,366.4 |
| France | 5 | 1,665.8 | Unavailable | | 5 | 1,935.4 | 5 | 1,848.6 | 5 | 1,923.4 |
| Canada | Unavailable | | Unavailable | | 6 | 861.7 | 6 | 896.8 | 6 | 975.0 |
| Italy | Unavailable | | Unavailable | | 7 | 653.8 | Out | | Out | |
| Netherlands | Unavailable | | Unavailable | | 8 | 647.4 | 7 ▲ | 618.8 | 9 ▼ | 629.4 |
| Spain | Unavailable | | Unavailable | | 9 | 586.7 | 10 ▼ | 493.7 | Out | |
| Australia | Unavailable | | Unavailable | | 10 | 492.4 | 9 ▲ | 545.6 | 10 ▼ | 598.4 |
| Mexico | Unavailable | | Unavailable | | Out | | 8 ▲ | 572.8 | 8 | 673.1 |
| Brazil | Unavailable | | Unavailable | | Out | | Out | | 7 ▲ | 782.5 |

== Statistics ==
Major music markets in history

List of countries by top 10 appearances (1990–2024)
| Country | Geographical region | Top 10 appearances (number of years) | Latest year in the top 10 | Highest rank |
|---|---|---|---|---|
| United States | North America | 34 | 2024 | 1 |
| Japan | Asia | 34 | 2024 | 1 |
| United Kingdom | Europe | 34 | 2024 | 3 |
| Germany | Europe | 34 | 2024 | 3 |
| France | Europe | 34 | 2024 | 4 |
| Canada | North America | 32 | 2024 | 6 |
| Australia | Oceania | 31 | 2023 | 6 |
| Italy | Europe | 20 | 2021 | 7 |
| Brazil | South America | 18 | 2024 | 6 |
| Netherlands | Europe | 15 | 2020 | 7 |
| Spain | Europe | 14 | 2009 | 7 |
| South Korea | Asia | 12 | 2024 | 6 |
| China | Asia | 8 | 2024 | 5 |
| Mexico | North America | 7 | 2024 | 8 |
| Russia | Europe / Asia | 3 | 2008 | 9 |

== See also ==
- Record sales
