= Jake Bugg discography =

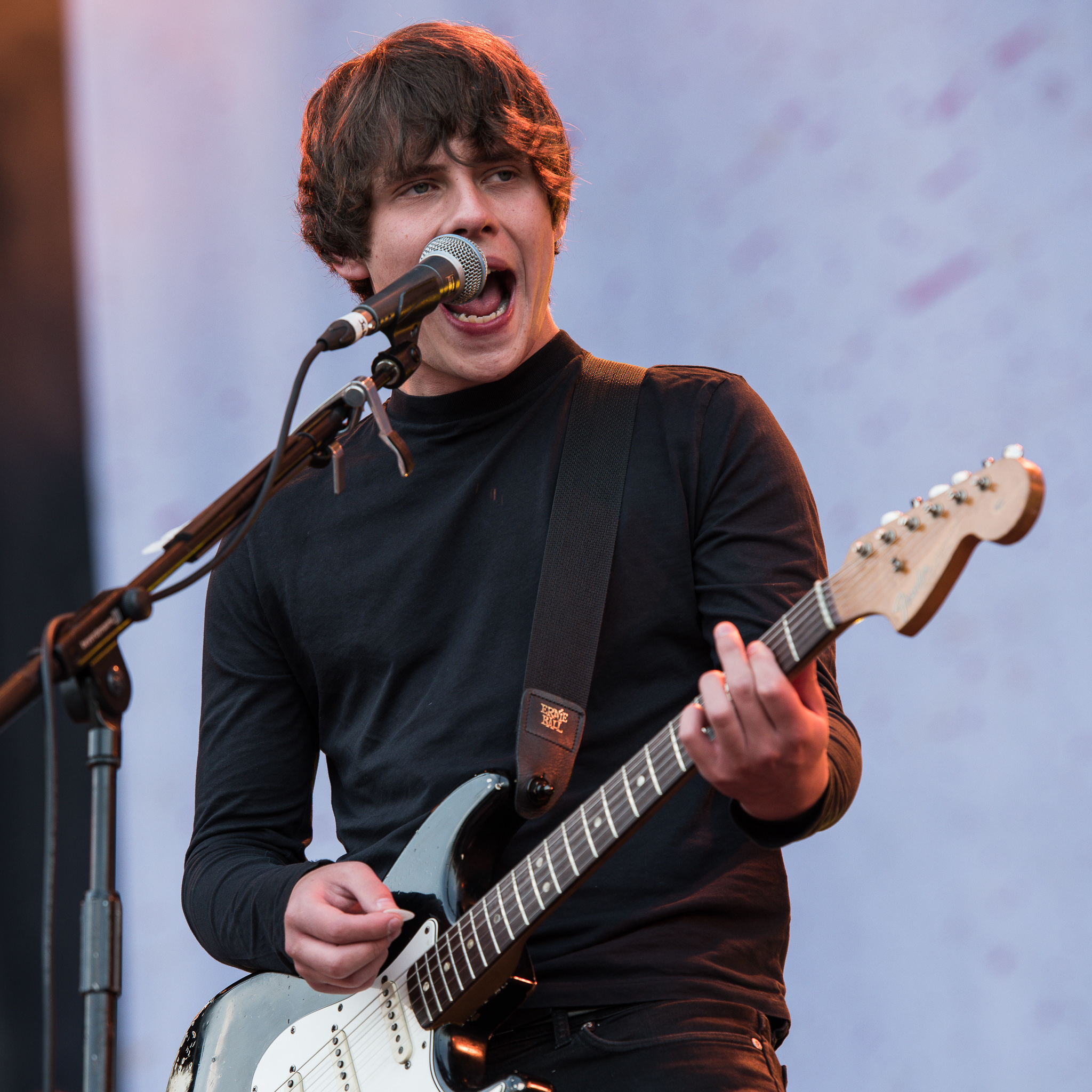
- Bugg performing in 2017
- Studio albums: 7
- EPs: 7
- Singles: 38
- Featured singles: 1

The discography of English singer-songwriter Jake Bugg consists of seven studio albums, seven EPs and thirty-eight singles (including one as a featured artist).

== Studio albums ==
Title	Album details	Peak chart positions										Certifications
Title	Album details	UK	AUS	BEL	FRA	GER	IRE	NZ	SCO	SWI	US	Certifications
Jake Bugg	Released: 15 October 2012; Label: Mercury; Format: CD, LP, digital download	1	19	11	21	10	3	7	1	39	75	BPI: 3× Platinum
Shangri La	Released: 18 November 2013; Label: Mercury; Format: CD, LP, digital download	3	38	14	61	21	9	19	2	19	46	BPI: Gold
On My One	Released: 17 June 2016; Label: Mercury; Format: CD, LP, digital download	4	17	19	87	27	19	— (Note: On My One did not enter the NZ Top 40 Albums Chart, but peaked at number one on the NZ Heatseeker Albums Chart.)	4	17	— (Note: On My One did not enter the US Billboard 200, but peaked at number 99 on the US Billboard Current Album Sales Chart.)	
Hearts That Strain	Released: 1 September 2017; Label: Virgin EMI; Format: CD, LP, digital download	7	44	37	165	—	62	— (Note: Hearts That Strain did not enter the NZ Top 40 Albums Chart, but peaked at number 10 on the NZ Heatseeker Albums Chart.)	7	80	—	
Saturday Night, Sunday Morning	Released: 20 August 2021; Label: Sony Music; Format: CD, LP, digital download	3	—	194	— (Note: Saturday Night, Sunday Morning did not enter the French Album Top 200, but peaked at number 139 on the French Top Album Physiques chart.)	95	58	—	4	45	—	
A Modern Day Distraction	Released: 4 October 2024; Label: RCA, Sony Music; Format: CD, LP, digital download	14	—	—	— (Note: A Modern Day Distraction did not enter the French Album Top 200, but peaked at number 149 on the French Top Album Physiques chart.)	—	—	—	9	—	—	
Alamo	Released: 13 November 2026; Label: Thirty Tigers, Lovebugg Recording; Format: CD, LP, digital download	8	—	196	—	—	—	—	2	—	—	
"—" denotes a release that did not chart or was not released in that territory.

== Extended plays ==
Title	EP details
iTunes Festival: London 2012	Released: 1 January 2012; Label: Mercury; Format: Digital download
Taste It	Released: 13 July 2012; Label: Mercury; Format: Digital download
iTunes Festival: London 2013	Released: 1 January 2013; Label: Mercury; Format: Digital download
Live at The Maze, Nottingham	Released: 9 December 2013; Label: Virgin EMI; Format: Digital download
Live at Silver Platters, Seattle	Released: 19 April 2014; Label: Virgin EMI; Format: Vinyl
Messed Up Kids	Released: 12 May 2014; Label: Virgin EMI; Format: Vinyl, digital download
Live for Burberry	Released: 22 February 2016; Label: Virgin EMI; Format: Digital download

== Singles ==
=== As lead artist ===
Title	Year	Peak chart positions										Certifications	Album
Title	Year	UK	BEL	CZ	IRE	JPN	MEX	NL	NZ	SCO	US Rock	Certifications	Album
"Trouble Town"	2012	— (Note: "Trouble Town" did not enter the UK Singles Chart, but peaked at number 34 on the UK Singles Sales Chart.)	— (Note: "Trouble Town" did not enter the Flanders Ultratop 50, but peaked at number 67 on the Ultratip chart.)	—	—	—	—	—	—	—	—		Jake Bugg
"Country Song"	2012	100	—	—	—	—	—	—	—	90	—		Jake Bugg
"Lightning Bolt"	2012	26	42	53	82	56	—	35	—	21	— (Note: "Lightning Bolt" did not enter the Hot Rock & Alternative Songs chart, but peaked at number 15 on the Triple A Airplay chart.)	BPI: Platinum	Jake Bugg
"Taste It"	2012	90	— (Note: "Taste It" did not enter the Flanders Ultratop 50, but peaked at number 18 on the Ultratip chart.)	—	—	60	—	—	—	54	—		Jake Bugg
"Two Fingers"	2012	28	— (Note: "Two Fingers" did not enter the Flanders Ultratop 50, but peaked at number 8 on the Ultratip chart.)	—	—	49	35	—	—	23	—	BPI: Gold	Jake Bugg
"Seen It All"	2013	61	— (Note: "Seen It All" did not enter the Flanders Ultratop 50, but peaked at number 5 on the Ultratip chart.)	—	—	—	—	—	—	49	—	BPI: Silver	Jake Bugg
"Kentucky"	2013	— (Note: "Kentucky" did not enter the UK Singles Chart, but peaked at number 18 on the UK Physical Singles Chart.)	—	—	—	—	—	—	—	—	—		Taste It EP
"Broken"	2013	44	— (Note: "Broken" did not enter the Flanders Ultratop 50, but peaked at number 39 on the Ultratip chart.)	—	20	—	—	66	20	40	—	BPI: Silver	Jake Bugg
"What Doesn't Kill You"	2013	44	— (Note: "What Doesn't Kill You" did not enter the Flanders Ultratop 50, but peaked at number 39 on the Ultratip chart.)	—	—	—	33	—	—	32	— (Note: "What Doesn't Kill You" did not enter the Hot Rock & Alternative Songs chart, but peaked at number 35 on the Alternative Airplay chart.)		Shangri La
"Slumville Sunrise"	2013	81	— (Note: "Slumville Sunrise" did not enter the Flanders Ultratop 50, but peaked at number 24 on the Ultratip chart.)	—	—	— (Note: "Slumville Sunrise" did not enter the Billboard Japan Hot 100 chart, but peaked at number 18 on the Billboard Japan Hot Overseas Songs chart.)	40	—	—	59	—		Shangri La
"A Song About Love"	2014	94	— (Note: "A Song About Love" did not enter the Flanders Ultratop 50, but peaked at number 41 on the Ultratip chart.)	—	—	—	—	—	—	77	—		Shangri La
"Me and You"	2014	—	— (Note: "Me and You" did not enter the Flanders Ultratop 50, but peaked at number 22 on the Ultratip chart.)	—	—	—	—	—	—	—	—		Shangri La
"Messed Up Kids"	2014	71	— (Note: "Messed Up Kids" did not enter the Flanders Ultratop 50, but peaked at number 17 on the Ultratip chart.)	—	—	—	44	—	—	65	—		Shangri La
"There's a Beast and We All Feed It"	2014	— (Note: "There's a Beast and We All Feed It" did not enter the UK Singles Chart, but peaked at number 9 on the UK Physical Singles Chart.)	—	—	—	—	—	—	—	—	—		Shangri La
"On My One"	2016	—	— (Note: "On My One" did not enter the Flanders Ultratop 50, but charted as an "extra tip" on the Ultratip chart.)	—	—	—	—	—	—	—	—		On My One
"Gimme the Love"	2016	— (Note: "Gimme the Love" did not enter the UK Singles Chart, but peaked at number 3 on the UK Physical Singles Chart.)	— (Note: "Gimme the Love" did not enter the Flanders Ultratop 50, but peaked at number 19 on the Ultratip chart.)	—	—	— (Note: "Gimme the Love" did not enter the Billboard Japan Hot 100 chart, but peaked at number 18 on the Billboard Japan Hot Overseas Songs chart.)	—	—	—	—	— (Note: "Gimme the Love" did not enter the Hot Rock & Alternative Songs chart, but peaked at number 50 on the US Rock & Alternative Airplay chart.)		On My One
"Love, Hope and Misery"	2016	— (Note: "Love, Hope and Misery" did not enter the UK Singles Chart, but peaked at number 89 on the UK Singles Sales Chart.)	— (Note: "Love, Hope and Misery" did not enter the Flanders Ultratop 50, but charted as an "extra tip" on the Ultratip chart.)	—	—	—	—	—	—	83	—		On My One
"The Love We're Hoping For"	2016	—	—	—	—	—	—	—	—	—	—		On My One
"Bitter Salt"	2016	—	—	—	—	—	45	—	—	—	—		On My One
"Put Out the Fire"	2016	—	—	—	—	—	42	—	—	—	—		On My One
"How Soon the Dawn"	2017	—	— (Note: "How Soon the Dawn" did not enter the Flanders Ultratop 50, but charted as an "extra tip" on the Ultratip chart.)	—	—	—	47	—	—	—	—		Hearts That Strain
"Waiting" (featuring Noah Cyrus)	2017	—	—	—	—	—	—	—	—	—	—		Hearts That Strain
"In the Event of My Demise"	2018	—	— (Note: "In the Event of My Demise" did not enter the Flanders Ultratop 50, but charted as an "extra tip" on the Ultratip chart.)	—	—	—	—	—	—	—	—		Hearts That Strain
"A.L.C.O.H.O.L."	2018	— (Note: "A.L.C.O.H.O.L." did not enter the UK Singles Chart, but peaked at number 31 on the UK Physical Singles Chart.)	—	—	—	—	—	—	—	—	—		Non-album single
"Be Someone" (with CamelPhat)	2019	58	— (Note: "Be Someone" did not enter the Flanders Ultratop 50, but peaked at number 10 on the Ultratip chart.)	—	71	—	—	—	— (Note: "Be Someone" did not enter the NZ Top 40 Singles Chart, but peaked at number 23 on the NZ Hot Singles Chart.)	26	—	BPI: Silver	Dark Matter
"Kiss Like the Sun"	2019	— (Note: "Kiss Like the Sun" did not enter the UK Singles Chart, but peaked at number six on the UK Physical Singles Chart Top 100.)	— (Note: "Kiss Like the Sun" did not enter the Flanders Ultratop 50, but peaked at number 28 on the Ultratip chart.)	—	—	—	—	—	—	—	—		Saturday Night, Sunday Morning
"Saviours of the City"	2020	— (Note: "Saviours of the City" did not enter the UK Singles Chart, but peaked at number 41 on the UK Physical Singles Chart Top 100.)	—	—	—	—	—	—	—	—	—		Non-album single
"Rabbit Hole"	2020	—	—	—	—	—	—	—	—	—	—		Saturday Night, Sunday Morning
"All I Need"	2020	— (Note: "All I Need" did not enter the UK Singles Chart, but peaked at number 10 on the UK Singles Sales Chart.)	— (Note: "All I Need" did not enter the Flanders Ultratop 50, but peaked at number 18 on the Ultratip chart.)	—	—	—	—	—	—	86	—	BPI: Silver	Saturday Night, Sunday Morning
"Lost"	2021	— (Note: "Lost" did not enter the UK Singles Chart, but peaked at number 41 on the UK Singles Sales Chart.)	—	—	—	—	—	—	—	×	—		Saturday Night, Sunday Morning
"Downtown"	2021	—	—	—	—	—	—	—	—	×	—		Saturday Night, Sunday Morning
"Seven Bridge Road"	2022	—	—	—	—	—	—	—	—	—	—		Non-album single
"Zombieland"	2024	—	—	—	—	—	—	—	—	—	—		A Modern Day Distraction
"All Kinds of People"	2024	—	—	—	—	—	—	—	—	—	—		A Modern Day Distraction
"Keep On Moving"	2024	—	—	—	—	—	—	—	—	—	—		A Modern Day Distraction
"I Wrote the Book"	2024	—	—	—	—	—	—	—	—	—	—		A Modern Day Distraction
"Never Can Tell"	2026	—	—	—	—	—	—	—	—	—	—		Alamo
"Day by Day"	2026	—	—	—	—	—	—	—	—	—	—		Alamo
"—" denotes single that did not chart or was not released. "×" denotes periods where charts did not exist or were not archived.

=== As featured artist ===
Title	Year	Album
"Find Me" (Tinie Tempah featuring Jake Bugg)	2017	Youth

== Other charted songs ==
Title	Year	Chart positions	Album
Title	Year	FRA	Album
"Simple as This"	2013	166	Jake Bugg

== Guest appearances ==
Title	Year	Album
"Turpin Hero"	2017	AMC's Turn: Washington's Spies Original Soundtrack Season 1 – EP
