= The Giver (soundtrack) =

2014 albums

The Giver (Music Collection)

Soundtrack album by Various artists
- Released: August 5, 2014
- Genres: Pop; contemporary R&B
- Length: 41:27
- Label: Interscope

Singles from The Giver (Music Collection)
- 1. "Ordinary Human" Released: August 2, 2014

The Giver (Original Motion Picture Soundtrack) is the score album composed by Marco Beltrami for the 2014 film of the same name directed by Phillip Noyce. The album was released on August 12, 2014 by Sony Music and features 20 tracks from the score. It was preceded by a mix of songs from the film released into a separate 10-song soundtrack titled The Giver (Music Collection), on August 5, by Interscope Records, led by OneRepublic's original song "Ordinary Human" written for the film.

== The Giver (Music Collection) ==
The soundtrack to the film was announced on July 25, 2014 featuring contributions from OneRepublic, Tori Kelly, Capital Cities, Bruno Major, Needtobreathe amongst several others. A teaser from the lead single of the album, titled "Ordinary Human" performed by OneRepublic was also released on the same day, with the full song being released on August 2, 2014. The soundtrack was released by Interscope Records on August 5.

=== Track listing ===
| No. | Title | Singer(s) | Length |
|---|---|---|---|
| 1. | "Ordinary Human" | OneRepublic | 4:51 |
| 2. | "One Minute More" | Capital Cities | 3:22 |
| 3. | "Silent" | Tori Kelly | 3:33 |
| 4. | "Feel What's Good" | Jake Bugg | 4:01 |
| 5. | "Children" | Bruno Major | 3:55 |
| 6. | "Whole" | Rixton | 3:40 |
| 7. | "Here Today" | Aloe Blacc | 3:55 |
| 8. | "Shine My Way" | Sheppard | 4:33 |
| 9. | "Difference Maker" | Needtobreathe | 5:42 |
| 10. | "I Lived" | OneRepublic | 3:55 |
| Total length: | | | 41:27 |

=== Awards ===
| Award | Category | Nominee | Result | Ref |
|---|---|---|---|---|
| Denver Film Critics Society | Best Original Song | "Ordinary Human" | Nominated | |
| Hollywood Music In Media Awards | Best Music Supervision – Film | Dana Sano | Nominated | |
| Hollywood Music In Media Awards | Best Soundtrack Album | The Giver | Nominated | |

== The Giver (Original Motion Picture Soundtrack) ==
The Giver (Original Motion Picture Soundtrack)

Film score by Marco Beltrami
- Released: August 12, 2014
- Recorded: 2013–2014
- Genre: Film score
- Length: 41:27
- Label: Sony Music
- Producer: Marco Beltrami

Marco Beltrami chronology
| Carrie (2013) | The Giver (2014) | The Homesman (2014) |

=== Background ===
Marco Beltrami composed the film's musical score in his first collaboration with Philip Noyce. Beltrami was a fan of the novel as his teenage children used to read it, and immediately agreed for the film adaptation. While scoring for The Giver, Noyce had earlier consulted few other composers before the film began shooting. He read the script and met him discussing about using some other ideas that could be implemented in the film's score, and gave him three demos inspired by the conversation and the film's script (including the main title theme), which had "actually filmed sequences [with] and had Jeff Bridges learn the music on piano" and filmed to that cue. Hence, by receiving the footage, the tone of the score has been set. Beltrami felt that "It really depends on me to see something, to see the picture, how it's filmed, the style, how it's presented. I am inspired just by the way a scene can be interpreted by the actors. It can make a huge difference on the type of music that you write. It's best for me if I don't work at all on a project until the movie is shot and I have some sort of edit in front of me." Beltrami had to discuss with Noyce through Skype for the film's music as he was simultaneously scoring for Snowpiercer (2013). Almost 86 minutes of the music had been written for the film.

=== Track listing ===
| No. | Title | Length |
|---|---|---|
| 1. | "Main Titles" | 3:07 |
| 2. | "Jonas Gets the Gig" | 1:33 |
| 3. | "Color" | 2:05 |
| 4. | "Arriving at the Giver's" | 1:48 |
| 5. | "First Memory" | 1:30 |
| 6. | "Gabriel Arrives" | 0:58 |
| 7. | "Do You See It" | 0:56 |
| 8. | "Tray Ride" | 2:30 |
| 9. | "Happiness & Pain" | 2:56 |
| 10. | "What Is Love?" | 2:21 |
| 11. | "War" | 3:20 |
| 12. | "The Kiss" | 2:27 |
| 13. | "Jonas Runs Away" | 2:51 |
| 14. | "Accelerated Training" | 2:39 |
| 15. | "Escape from the Nursery" | 2:10 |
| 16. | "Desert Ride" | 2:18 |
| 17. | "Capturing Jonas" | 3:32 |
| 18. | "The Mountain and Despair" | 1:46 |
| 19. | "Rosebud" | 4:32 |
| 20. | "End Credits" | 3:49 |
| Total length: | | 49:08 |

=== Reception ===
James Southall of Movie Wave wrote "The Giver is a very impressive piece of work, a score with a clear and brilliantly-developed dramatic journey – on the surface it's impressive enough, but dig a little deeper and there are riches to be explored. I suspect this is going to prove to be one of the most popular scores he's ever written." Pete Simons of Synchrotones wrote "There is nothing overly complicated about this score, yet it is incredibly emotive. The subtle orchestrations and beautiful performance make this score both a mesmerising listen and a must-have!" David Klein of Popoptiq wrote "Much of what Beltrami turns in is more reminiscent of temp tracks or wisps of ideas, but if there's a real criticism to The Giver it's that the score's gestures toward complexity reflect neither the film's conceit nor execution. The only grey area here is the cheap filter Noyce employs. A main theme continually rises towards an nonexistent destination, higher and higher into its fluffy ether. To that end at least, it's right on the money."

Mfiles wrote "Although Marco Beltrami's approach with The Giver is hardly innovative or revolutionary, it does possess genuine heart and sincerity. The underrated composer has shown a penchant for melody throughout his career, which is easily overlooked when one considers that he usually scores horror or action movies. The Giver is undoubtedly one of the composer's most attractive soundtracks, featuring an exquisitely mixed, sensitive balance of orchestra and choir. It's also a score that cleverly mirrors the narrative of the movie, with the innocence and purity of the first half gradually overtaken by a gloomier sense of despair. Yet even amidst the darkness, Beltrami never forgoes his more tender side, allowing for a dynamic and accessible listening experience. As a film, The Giver is unlikely to linger in the memory but it would be a real shame if the score was to go the same way. It's less splashy and bombastic than many of this year's scores, but that doesn't mean it ought to be underestimated or ignored. In terms of craft and beauty, Beltrami's score is easily the equal of its more overhyped brethren."
