= Steve Mac =

British musician and producer (born 1972)

- Born: Steven McCutcheon; 15 January 1972 (age 54)
- Origin: Chertsey, Surrey, England
- Occupations: Musician; songwriter; record producer
- Years active: 1990–present

Steven McCutcheon (born 15 January 1972), known professionally as Steve Mac, is a British record producer, songwriter and musician. He has contributed to 30 number one singles in the UK Singles Chart.

== Career ==
=== Early career ===
Mac got his break in the music industry in the early 1990s when he wrote and produced the Nomad hit "(I Wanna Give You) Devotion", that reached no.2 in the UK Singles Chart. In 1992, he became part of dance group Undercover, who had several European hit singles, including "Baker Street" and "Never Let Her Slip Away". McCutcheon formed, with Darren Pearce, the duo Gems for Jem. Their single "Lifting Me Higher", sampling the Evelyn Thomas song "High Energy", topped the UK Dance Chart in May 1995.

He then met songwriter Wayne Hector, with the pair striking up a partnership that has seen them co-write and produce a range of chart songs.

Mac has gone on to work with some of the most recognised names in the music industry. He has written, co-written and produced hits for musicians including Ed Sheeran, Melanie C, Pink, Westlife, Little Mix, and many other UK and international singers.

From his Rokstone Studios in London, the artists he has written and produced for have racked up over 200 million sales worldwide during his career. As well as a string of no.1 UK and international hits, Mac has also penned top 10 singles for artists such as Calvin Harris, Demi Lovato, One Direction, The Saturdays, Leona Lewis, and Rita Ora, among others.

=== Work with Westlife ===
The producer has had a long-standing collaboration with Irish boyband, Westlife, dating back to the late 1990s. This artistic partnership resulted in him co-writing and producing four no.1 UK singles for the band. He has co-produced another five no.1 hits and produced three top five singles. Mac also co-wrote and produced the band's 2000 hit Christmas single, "What Makes a Man" reaching no.2 in the UK singles chart.

=== 2010–2017 ===
Mac won the first of his two Brit Awards in 2010 for co-writing and producing the no.1 single "Beat Again" for British pop/R&B band, JLS.

In 2012, the producer worked with a host of artists including Little Mix, The Wanted, The Saturdays, Susan Boyle, Il Divo, Boyzone, and Gareth Gates.

Mac was recognised in 2012, and then again in 2013 by picking up the ASCAP Song of the Year Award. The awards were in recognition of co-writing and producing the hits "Glad You Came" for The Wanted, and "You Make Me Feel..." by Cobra Starship, respectively.

Between 2013 and 2015, Mac worked with several musicians include James Blunt, John Newman, Union J, Calvin Harris, The Vamps, and Demi Lovato. He made several contributions to both James Blunt's Moon Landing album that reached no.2 in the UK album chart and The Vamps’ Wake Up album that was a top 10 hit.

Mac scored another number one hit in 2016 with "Rockabye" by Clean Bandit featuring Sean Paul and Anne-Marie. The song reached the top of the UK singles chart, staying there for nine consecutive weeks. The single also won in the EDM Winning Songs category alongside his other co-produced track for Clean Bandit and Zara Larsson, "Symphony".

In 2017, Mac picked up the Songwriter of the Year and Producer of the Year at the Music Business Worldwide A&R Awards and the ASCAP Founders Award for "his pioneering contribution to music, global success and a 27 year body of work".

The same year, Mac co-wrote Ed Sheeran's No. 1 single "Shape of You" with Sheeran and Johnny McDaid. The song broke chart history, spending 14 weeks at the top of the UK chart, and remaining in the Top 10 of the Billboard Hot 100 in the US for 33 weeks. It also claimed the unique achievement of being the most-streamed song of all time on Spotify.

He also received another Grammy nomination for Pink's US top twenty single "What About Us", which he wrote and produced.

=== 2018–present ===
2018 saw the producer work with some of music's most prolific names such as Chvrches, Years & Years, Celine Dion, Little Mix, Craig David, and Westlife.

Mac won the 2018 Brit Award for British Producer of the Year. As well as the Brit Award, he also won both Songwriter of the Year and Song of the Year at the Annual ASCAP Pop Music Awards 2018 in LA.

In another award recognising Mac's work, the multi-platinum hit "Shape of You" he co-wrote and produced for Ed Sheeran picked up both a Grammy Award and the Ivor Novello Award for PRS for Music Most Performed Work in 2017.

== Awards ==
Brit Awards 2018:

British Producer of the Year

35th Annual ASCAP Pop Music Awards 2018

Songwriter of the Year:

Song of the Year – Shape of You, Ed Sheeran | Strip That Down, Liam Payne ft. Quavo | Rockabye, Clean Bandit ft. Sean Paul | What About Us, P!nk

Music Business Worldwide A&R Awards 2017

Producer of the Year

Songwriter of the Year

ASCAP Song of the Year Awards 2013

Glad You Came, The Wanted: (Co-writer & Co-producer)

ASCAP Song of the Year Awards 2012

You Make Me Feel... Cobra Starship: (Co-writer & Co-producer)

Brit Awards 2010

Song of the Year: Beat Again, JLS (Co-written with Wayne Hector)

BMI Awards 2001

Pop Award: Swear It Again, Westlife (Co-written with Wayne Hector)

== Songwriting and production discography ==
Title	Year	Artist	Album	Songwriter	Producer			
Title	Year	Artist	Album	Songwriter	Primary	Secondary	Additional	Vocal
"Still Don't Care"	2025	Meghan Trainor	Toy with Me	check	check			
"Ten More Days"	2025	Henry Moodie	Mood Swings	check	check			
"Chariot"	2025	Westlife	25: The Ultimate Collection	check	check			
"Guardian Angel"	2025	Carly Rae Jepsen	Emotion (10th Anniversary Edition)	check				
"Freedom"	2025	Ed Sheeran	Play	check	check			
"OH OK"	2025	Sam Ryder	TBA	check	check			
"Rich"	2025	Bea and her Business	Non-album single	check	check			
"Sleeping With The Lights On"	2025	Daniel Seavey	Second Wind	check	check			
"Inside Out"	2024	The Script	Satellites	check	check			
"Cry Baby"	2024	Clean Bandit, Anne-Marie and David Guetta	Non-album single	check				
"Some Things Don't Last Forever"	2024	Cat Burns	Early Twenties	check	check			
"Alone"	2024	Cat Burns	Early Twenties	check	check			
"Easy"	2024	Jess Glynne	Jess	check	check			
"Taboo"	2024	Kylie Minogue	Tension II	check	check			
"My Oh My"	2024	Kylie Minogue, Bebe Rexha and Tove Lo	Tension II	check	check			
"Pointless"	2023	Lewis Capaldi	Broken by Desire to Be Heavenly Sent	check	check			
"Weekends"	2023	Freya Ridings	Blood Orange	check	check			
"Do You Mind"	2023	Joel Corry	Another Friday Night	check				
"Baby Don't Hurt Me"	2023	David Guetta, Anne-Marie and Coi Leray	Non-album single	check				
"Celestial"	2022	Ed Sheeran	Non-album single	check	check			
"LOL"	2022	Mabel	About Last Night	check	check			
"Who We Love"	2022	Sam Smith	Gloria	check	check			
"All My Loving"	2022	Sam Fischer	Non-album single	check	check			
"Sun Will Shine"	2022	Robin Schulz and Tom Walker	Pink	check			check	
"Kiss Me"	2022	Dermot Kennedy	Sonder	check	check			
"My Hero"	2021	Westlife	Wild Dreams	check	check			
"Something Beautiful"	2021	Tom Walker	Non-album singles	check	check			
"Those Who Can't Be Here"	2021	Tom Walker	Non-album singles	check	check			
"Shivers"	2021	Ed Sheeran	=	check	check			
"Eternal Love"	2021	JLS	2.0	check	check			
"Permission to Dance"	2021	BTS	Non-album single	check	check			
"Psycho"	2021	Maisie Peters	You Signed Up For This	check	check			
"Lost"	2021	Jake Bugg	Saturday Night, Sunday Morning	check	check			
"More"	2021	Ina Wroldsen	Matters Of The Mind	check	check			
"Look What You've Done"	2021	Zara Larsson	Poster Girl	check	check			
"Call Your Friends"	2021	London Grammar	Californian Soil	check		check		
"How Does It Feel"	2021	London Grammar	Californian Soil	check		check		
"New Love" (featuring Ellie Goulding)	2021	Silk City	Non-album single	check				check
"All I Need"	2020	Jake Bugg	Saturday Night, Sunday Morning	check	check			
"Stand By Me"	2020	John Newman	Non-album single		check			
"Young"	2020	Sam Smith	Love Goes	check	check			
"Hallelujah"	2020	Brother Leo	Non-album singles			check		
"Her"	2020	Anne-Marie	Non-album singles	check	check			
"Ur So F**kInG cOoL"	2020	Tones and I	Non-album singles		check			
"Gold"	2020	Paloma Faith	Infinite Things	check	check			
"Boyfriend"	2020	Mabel	High Expectations	check	check			
"Instant History"	2020	Biffy Clyro	A Celebration of Endings	check		check		
"Space"	2020	Biffy Clyro	A Celebration of Endings	check				
"Don't Let It Break Your Heart"	2019	Louis Tomlinson	Walls		check			
"L.O.V.E."	2019	Westlife	Spectrum	check	check			
"Hello My Love"	2019	Westlife	Spectrum	check	check			
"Dynamite"	2019	Westlife	Spectrum	check	check			
"My Blood"	2019	Westlife	Spectrum	check	check			
"Better Man"	2019	Westlife	Spectrum	check	check			
"Without You"	2019	Westlife	Spectrum	check	check			
"Repair"	2019	Westlife	Spectrum	check	check			
"Take Me There"	2019	Westlife	Spectrum	check	check			
"One Last Time"	2019	Westlife	Spectrum	check	check			
"Home to You"	2019	Sigrid	Non-album singles	check	check			
"Haloes"	2019	Ina Wroldsen	Non-album singles	check	check			
"Stack It Up" (featuring A Boogie wit da Hoodie)	2019	Liam Payne	LP1	check	check			
"Til I Met You"	2019	Max George	Non-album singles	check				
"What Am I"	2019	Why Don't We	Non-album singles	check	check			
"Way to Break My Heart" (featuring Skrillex)	2019	Ed Sheeran	No.6 Collaborations Project	check	check			
"South of the Border" (featuring Camila Cabello and Cardi B)	2019	Ed Sheeran	No.6 Collaborations Project	check	check			
"Harder" (with Bebe Rexha)	2019	Jax Jones	Snacks (Supersize)	check	check			
"Mad Love"	2019	Mabel	High Expectations	check	check			
"Call You Mine" (with Bebe Rexha)	2019	The Chainsmokers	World War Joy	check				
"Sing It with Me" (with Astrid S)	2019	JP Cooper	Non-album single	check	check			
"Broken & Beautiful"	2019	Kelly Clarkson	UglyDolls OST	check	check			
"So Beautiful"	2019	James Morrison	You're Stronger Than You Know	check				
"Here with Me" (featuring Chvrches)	2019	Marshmello	Non-album single	check	check			
"Now You're Gone" (featuring Zara Larsson)	2019	Tom Walker	What a time to Be Alive	check	check			
"Don't Call Me Up"	2019	Mabel	High Expectations	check	check			
"Brand New"	2018	Craig David	The Time is Now	check	check			
"Trust Fund Baby"	2018	Why Don't We	8 Letters	check	check			
"Want You Back"	2018	5 Seconds of Summer	Youngblood	check				
"Follow Your Fire"	2018	Kodaline	Politics of Living	check	check			
"Your Love"	2018	Zak Abel	Non-album single	check	check			
"Miracle"	2018	Chvrches	Love is Dead	check	check			
"2002"	2018	Anne-Marie	Speak Your Mind	check	check			
"Melody" (featuring James Blunt)	2018	Lost Frequencies	Alive and Feeling Fine	check				
"One More River"	2018	Melo Moreno	Colours	check				
"Breathing Fire"	2018	Anne-Marie	Speak Your Mind	check	check			
"Ashes"	2018	Celine Dion	Deadpool2		check			
"If You're Over Me"	2018	Years & Years	Palo Santo	check	check			
"Summer on You"	2018	PrettyMuch	Non-album singles	check	check			
"Barcelona"	2018	Max George	Non-album singles	check	check			
"Happier"	2018	Bastille & Marshmello	Non-album singles	check				
"Right Now" (with Robin Schulz)	2018	Nick Jonas	Non-album singles	check	check			
"Born Again"	2018	Kodaline	Politics of Living	check	check			
"Moves" (featuring Snoop Dogg)	2018	Olly Murs	You Know I Know	check	check			
"Thursday"	2018	Jess Glynne	Always in Between	check	check			
"Woman Like Me" (featuring Nicki Minaj)	2018	Little Mix	LM5	check	check			
"Wild" (featuring Chelcee Grimes, TINI and Jhay Cortez)	2018	Jonas Blue	Blue	check				
"Fire on Fire"	2018	Sam Smith	Non-album single	check	check			
"Thumbs"	2017	Sabrina Carpenter	Evolution	check	check			
"Shape of You" (solo / featuring Stormzy)	2017	Ed Sheeran	÷	check	check			
"2005"	2017	James Blunt	The Afterlove	check				
"Symphony" (featuring Zara Larsson)	2017	Clean Bandit	What Is Love?	check				
"Don't Let Me Be Yours"	2017	Zara Larsson	So Good	check	check			
"Happy"	2017	Steps	Tears on the Dancefloor	check				
"Firefly"	2017	Steps	Tears on the Dancefloor	check				
"Strip That Down" (featuring Quavo)	2017	Liam Payne	LP1	check	check			
"OK" (featuring James Blunt)	2017	Robin Schulz	Uncovered	check	check			
"Your Song"	2017	Rita Ora	Phoenix	check	check			
"What About Us"	2017	Pink	Beautiful Trauma	check	check			
"A Different Way" (with Lauv)	2017	DJ Snake	Non-album single	check				
"The Rest of Our Life" (with Faith Hill)	2017	Tim McGraw	The Rest of Our Life	check				
"Leave a Light On"	2017	Tom Walker	What a Time to Be Alive	check	check			
"Bedroom Floor"	2017	Liam Payne	LP1	check	check			
"Then"	2017	Anne-Marie	Speak Your Mind	check	check			
"Keeping Your Head Up"	2016	Birdy	Beautiful Lies	check	check			
"Hear You Calling"	2016	Birdy	Beautiful Lies	check	check			
"Love Is the Name" (solo / featuring J Balvin)	2016	Sofia Carson	Non-album single	check	check			
"Phoenix"	2016	Olivia Holt	Olivia EP	check	check			
"Alarm"	2016	Anne-Marie	Speak Your Mind	check	check			
"Rockabye" (featuring Sean Paul and Anne-Marie)	2016	Clean Bandit	What Is Love?	check	check			
"So Good"	2016	Louisa Johnson	Non-album single	check	check			
"Mary's Story"	2016	Ina Wroldsen	Non-album single	check				
"Years & Years"	2016	Olly Murs	24 HRS	check	check			
"Deeper"	2016	Olly Murs	24 HRS	check	check			
"Adore"	2015	Jasmine Thompson	Adore EP	check	check			
"Take Me Home"	2015	Jess Glynne	I Cry When I Laugh	check	check			
"My Love" (Acoustic)	2015	Jess Glynne	I Cry When I Laugh		check			
"Love Me Like You"	2015	Little Mix	Get Weird	check	check			
"Survivors"	2015	Selena Gomez	Revival	check	check			
"Kingdom Come" (featuring Iggy Azalea)	2015	Demi Lovato	Confident	check	check			
"Waitin for You" (featuring Sirah)	2015	Demi Lovato	Confident	check	check			
"Lionheart"	2015	Demi Lovato	Confident	check	check			
"Hitchiker"	2015	OMI	Me 4 U	check	check			
"Volcano" (featuring Silento)	2015	The Vamps	Wake Up	check	check			
"Wake Up"	2015	The Vamps	Wake Up	check	check			
"Windmills"	2015	The Vamps	Wake Up	check	check			
"I Found a Girl"	2015	The Vamps	Wake Up	check	check			
"Be with You"	2015	The Vamps	Wake Up	check	check			
"Colorblind"	2014	Amber Riley	Non-album single	check				
"Mr. C"	2014	Nina Nesbitt	Peroxide	check	check			
"Empire"	2014	Shakira	Shakira	check	check			
"Me and My Broken Heart"	2014	Rixton	Let the Road	check	check			
"Break the Rules"	2014	Charli XCX	Sucker	check	check			
"When I Find Love Again"	2014	James Blunt	Moon Landing: Special Edition	check	check			
"Glow"	2014	Ella Henderson	Chapter One	check	check			
"Aliens (Her Er Jeg)"	2014	Ina Wroldsen	non-album single	check	check			
"Bumper Cars"	2014	Alex & Sierra	It's About Us	check	check			
"Get Away"	2014	Jessie J	Sweet Talker	check	check			
"Faith"	2014	Calvin Harris	Motion	check				
"Stick with Me"	2014	Olly Murs	Never Been Better	check	check			
"In Your Eyes"	2013	Inna	Party Never Ends	check	check			
"Down the Line"	2013	John Newman	Tribute	check				
"Running"	2013	John Newman	Tribute	check				
"Satellites"	2013	James Blunt	Moon Landing	check				
"Miss America"	2013	James Blunt	Moon Landing	check				
"The Only One"	2013	James Blunt	Moon Landing	check				
"Sun on Sunday"	2013	James Blunt	Moon Landing	check				
"Bones"	2013	James Blunt	Moon Landing	check		check		
"Working It Out"	2013	James Blunt	Moon Landing	check	check			
"Loving You is Easy"	2013	Union J	Union J	check	check			
"Carry You"	2013	Union J	Union J	check	check			
"Beethoven"	2013	Union J	Union J	check	check			
"Head in the Clouds"	2013	Union J	Union J	check	check			
"Where Are You Now"	2013	Union J	Union J	check	check			
"Save the Last Dance"	2013	Union J	Union J	check	check			
"Amaze Me"	2013	Union J	Union J	check	check			
"Lucky Ones"	2013	Union J	Union J	check	check			
"About You"	2013	Shane Filan	You and Me	check	check			
"Everybody Knows"	2013	The Wanted	Word of Mouth	check	check			
"Sparks"	2012	Cover Drive	Bajan Style	check	check			
"That Girl"	2012	Cover Drive	Bajan Style	check	check			
"Explode"	2012	Cover Drive	Bajan Style	check	check			
"30 Days"	2012	The Saturdays	Living for the Weekend	check	check			
"I Found You"	2012	The Wanted	Word of Mouth	check	check			
"Turn Your Face"	2012	Little Mix	DNA	check	check			
"We Are Who We Are"	2012	Little Mix	DNA	check	check			
"You Make Me Feel..." (featuring Sabi)	2011	Cobra Starship	Night Shades	check	check			
"Notorious"	2011	The Saturdays	On Your Radar	check	check			
"Glad You Came"	2011	The Wanted	Battleground	check	check			
"Everybody Knows"	2011	The Wanted	Battleground	check	check			
"Lightning"	2011	The Wanted	Battleground	check	check			
"Autumn Leaves"	2011	Susan Boyle	Someone to Watch Over Me		check			
"You Have to Be There"	2011	Susan Boyle	Someone to Watch Over Me		check			
"Enjoy the Silence"	2011	Susan Boyle	Someone to Watch Over Me		check			
"Unchained Melody"	2011	Susan Boyle	Someone to Watch Over Me		check			
"Both Sides, Now"	2011	Susan Boyle	Someone to Watch Over Me		check			
"Lilac Wine"	2011	Susan Boyle	Someone to Watch Over Me		check			
"Mad World"	2011	Susan Boyle	Someone to Watch Over Me		check			
"This Will Be the Year"	2011	Susan Boyle	Someone to Watch Over Me		check			
"Return"	2011	Susan Boyle	Someone to Watch Over Me	check	check			
"Ue o Muite Arukō/The First Star"	2011	Susan Boyle	Someone to Watch Over Me		check			
"Third Man Theme"	2011	Susan Boyle	Someone to Watch Over Me		check			
"Gotta Be You"	2011	One Direction	Up All Night	check	check			
"My Heart Takes Over"	2011	The Saturdays	On Your Radar	check	check			
"Faster"	2011	The Saturdays	On Your Radar	check	check			
"Cannonball"	2011	Little Mix	Non-album single	check	check			
"Woman"	2011	2010	Toni Braxton	Pulse	check	check		
"All Time Low"	The Wanted	2010	The Wanted	check	check			
"Karma"	The Saturdays	2010	Headlines!	check	check			
"Perfect Day"	Susan Boyle	2010	The Gift		check			
"Hallelujah"	Susan Boyle	2010	The Gift		check			
"Do You Hear What I Hear?" (featuring Amber Stassi)	Susan Boyle	2010	The Gift		check			
"Don't Dream It's Over"	Susan Boyle	2010	The Gift		check			
"The First Noel"	Susan Boyle	2010	The Gift		check			
"O Holy Night"	Susan Boyle	2010	The Gift		check			
"Away in a Manger"	Susan Boyle	2010	The Gift		check			
"Make Me a Channel of Your Peace"	Susan Boyle	2010	The Gift		check			
"Auld Lang Syne"	Susan Boyle	2010	The Gift		check			
"O Come All Ye Faithfull"	Susan Boyle	2010	The Gift		check			
"Vapor Trail"	Susan Boyle	2010	The Gift		check			
"Before the Rain"	Alexandra Burke	2010	Overcome	check	check			
"Beat Again"	2009	JLS	JLS	check	check			
"Crazy for You"	2009	JLS	JLS	check	check			
"The Club is Alive"	2009	JLS	JLS	check	check			
"Wild Horses"	2009	Susan Boyle	I Dreamed a Dream		check			
"I Dreamed a Dream"	2009	Susan Boyle	I Dreamed a Dream		check			
"Cry Me a River"	2009	Susan Boyle	I Dreamed a Dream		check			
"How Great Thou Art"	2009	Susan Boyle	I Dreamed a Dream		check			
"You'll See"	2009	Susan Boyle	I Dreamed a Dream		check			
"Daydream Believer"	2009	Susan Boyle	I Dreamed a Dream		check			
"Up to the Mountain"	2009	Susan Boyle	I Dreamed a Dream		check			
"Amazing Grace"	2009	Susan Boyle	I Dreamed a Dream		check			
"Who I Was Born to Be"	2009	Susan Boyle	I Dreamed a Dream		check			
"Proud"	2009	Susan Boyle	I Dreamed a Dream		check			
"The End of the World"	2009	Susan Boyle	I Dreamed a Dream		check			
"Silent Night"	2009	Susan Boyle	I Dreamed a Dream		check			
"Wings to Fly"	2009	Susan Boyle	I Dreamed a Dream		check			
"Ego"	2009	The Saturdays	Wordshaker	check	check			
"La fuerza mayor"	2008	Il Divo	The Promise		check			
"La Promessa"	2008	Il Divo	The Promise		check			
"Adagio"	2008	Il Divo	The Promise		check			
"Hallelujah"	2008	Il Divo	The Promise		check			
"L'alba del mondo"	2008	Il Divo	The Promise		check			
"Enamorado"	2008	Il Divo	The Promise		check			
"Angelina"	2008	Il Divo	The Promise		check			
"Va todo al ganador"	2008	Il Divo	The Promise		check			
"La luna"	2008	Il Divo	The Promise		check			
"She"	2008	Il Divo	The Promise		check			
"Amazing Grace"	2008	Il Divo	The Promise		check			
"Por ti vuelvo a nacer"	2008	Il Divo	The Promise		check			
"Sortilegio De Amor"	2008	Il Divo	The Promise		check			
"When You Believe"	2008	Leon Jackson	Right Now		check			
"You Don't Know Me"	2008	Leon Jackson	Right Now		check			
"A Song for You"	2008	Leon Jackson	Right Now		check			
"Fingerprints"	2008	Leon Jackson	Right Now		check			
"Amaze Me"	2007	No Angels	Destiny	check				
"Carolyna"	2007	Melanie C	This Time	check	check			
"Understand"	2007	Melanie C	This Time		check			
"Woman"	2007	Delta Goodrem	Delta	check	check			
"Home"	2007	Westlife	Back Home		check			
"Have You Ever"	2007	Westlife	Back Home		check			
"It's You"	2007	Westlife	Back Home	check	check			
"Catch My Breath"	2007	Westlife	Back Home	check	check			
"I Do"	2007	Westlife	Back Home	check	check			
"Hard to Say I'm Sorry"	2007	Westlife	Back Home		check			
"Get Away"	2007	Westlife	Back Home	check	check			
"Homeless"	2007	Leona Lewis	Spirit		check			
"Footprints in the Sand"	2007	Leona Lewis	Spirit		check			
"All My Life"	2006	Shayne Ward	Shayne Ward		check			
"What About Me"	2006	Shayne Ward	Shayne Ward		check			
"Back at One"	2006	Shayne Ward	Shayne Ward		check			
"Total Eclipse of the Heart"	2006	Westlife	The Love Album		check			
"You Light Up My Life"	2006	Westlife	The Love Album		check			
"Easy"	2006	Westlife	The Love Album		check			
"You Are So Beautiful (to Me)"	2006	Westlife	The Love Album		check			
"Have You Ever Been in Love"	2006	Westlife	The Love Album		check			
"The Dance"	2006	Westlife	The Love Album		check			
"All or Nothing"	2006	Westlife	The Love Album	check	check			
"You've Lost That Loving Feeling"	2006	Westlife	The Love Album		check			
"A Moment Like This"	2006	Leona Lewis	Spirit		check			
"You Raise Me Up"	2005	Westlife	Face to Face		check			
"That's Where You Find Love"	2005	Westlife	Face to Face	check	check			
"She's Back"	2005	Westlife	Face to Face	check	check			
"Desperado"	2005	Westlife	Face to Face		check			
"In This Life"	2005	Westlife	Face to Face		check			
"Heart Without a Home"	2005	Westlife	Face to Face	check	check			
"Change Your Mind"	2005	Westlife	Face to Face	check	check			
"Baby Can I Hold You"	2004	Ronan Keating	10 Years of Hits		check			
"Regresa a mi"	2004	Il Divo	Il Divo		check			
"Mama"	2004	Il Divo	Il Divo		check			
"Passera"	2004	Il Divo	Il Divo		check			
"The Man You Love"	2004	Il Divo	Il Divo	check	check			
"Feelings"	2004	Il Divo	Il Divo		check			
"Hoy que ya no estas aqui"	2004	Il Divo	Il Divo		check			
"My Way (A mi manera)"	2004	Il Divo	Il Divo		check			
"A Moment Like This"	2003	Kelly Clarkson	Thankful		check			
"Hey Whatever"	2003	Westlife	Turnaround	check	check			
"Mandy"	2003	Westlife	Turnaround		check			
"Heal"	2003	Westlife	Turnaround		check			
"On My Shoulder"	2003	Westlife	Turnaround	check	check			
"Turn Around"	2003	Westlife	Turnaround	check	check			
"I Did It for You"	2003	Westlife	Turnaround		check			
"Thank You"	2003	Westlife	Turnaround	check	check			
"To Be with You"	2003	Westlife	Turnaround		check			
"Home"	2003	Westlife	Turnaround	check	check			
"What Do They Know?"	2003	Westlife	Turnaround	check	check			
"Unbreakable"	2002	Westlife	Unbreakable: The Greatest Hits; Volume 1		check			
"How Does It Feel"	2002	Westlife	Unbreakable: The Greatest Hits; Volume 1		check			
"Tonight"	2002	Westlife	Unbreakable: The Greatest Hits; Volume 1	check	check			
"Love Takes Two"	2002	Westlife	Unbreakable: The Greatest Hits; Volume 1	check	check			
"Miss You Nights"	2002	Westlife	Unbreakable: The Greatest Hits; Volume 1		check			
"All or Nothing"	2001	O-Town	O-Town	check	check			
"Uptown Girl"	2001	Westlife	World of Our Own		check			
"You Are"	2001	Atomic Kitten	Right Now	check	check			
"Help Me Understand"	2001	Trace Adkins	Chrome	check				
"Queen of My Heart"	2001	Westlife	World of Our Own	check	check			
"Bop Bop Baby"	2001	Westlife	World of Our Own		check			
"I Wanna Grow Old with You"	2001	Westlife	World of Our Own		check			
"World of Our Own"	2001	Westlife	World of Our Own	check	check			
"To Be Loved"	2001	Westlife	World of Our Own	check	check			
"Drive (All the Time)"	2001	Westlife	World of Our Own	check	check			
"Angel"	2001	Westlife	World of Our Own		check			
"Don't Get Me Wrong"	2001	Westlife	World of Our Own		check			
"Reason for Living"	2001	Westlife	World of Our Own		check			
"What If"	2001	Kate Winslet	Christmas Carol: The Movie OST	check	check			
"Blah, Blah, Blah"	2000	Devotion 2 Music	Pokémon: The Movie OST	check				
"One Heart"	2000	O-Town	Pokémon: The Movie OST	check				
"If I Don't Tell You Now"	2000	Ronan Keating	Ronan		check			
"I Want Candy"	2000	Aaron Carter	Aaron's Party (Come Get It)		check			
"Against All Odds" (with Mariah Carey)	2000	Westlife	Coast to Coast / Rainbow		check			
"Real Good Time"	2000	Aaron Carter	Aaron's Party (Come Get It)		check			
"Tell Me What You Want"	2000	Aaron Carter	Aaron's Party (Come Get It)		check			
"Lately"	2000	Samantha Mumba	Gotta Tell You		check			
"He Don't Love You"	2000	Human Nature	Human Nature		check			
"What Makes a Man"	2000	Westlife	Coast to Coast	check	check			
"Close"	2000	Westlife	Coast to Coast	check	check			
"Angel's Wings"	2000	Westlife	Coast to Coast	check	check			
"No Place That Far"	2000	Westlife	Coast to Coast		check			
"Close Your Eyes"	2000	Westlife	Coast to Coast	check	check			
"You Make Me Feel"	2000	Westlife	Coast to Coast		check			
"Fragile Heart"	2000	Westlife	Coast to Coast		check			
"Every Little Thing You Do"	2000	Westlife	Coast to Coast	check	check			
"I Have a Dream"	2000	Westlife	Coast to Coast		check			
"My Girl"	2000	Westlife	Coast to Coast		check			
"I'll Be There"	2000	Westlife	Coast to Coast		check			
"What Becomes of the Brokenhearted"		Westlife	Coast to Coast	check				
"Swear It Again"	1999	Westlife	Westlife	check	check			
"Flying Without Wings"	1999	Westlife	Westlife	check	check			
"Keep on Movin'"	1999	5ive	Invincible				check	
"I Don't Wanna Fight"	1999	Westlife	Westlife	check	check			
"Moments"	1999	Westlife	Westlife	check	check			
"More Than Words"	1999	Westlife	Westlife		check			
"We Are One"	1999	Westlife	Westlife	check	check			
"Until the End of Time"	1999	Westlife	Westlife	check	check			
"Forever"	1999	Westlife	Westlife	check	check			
"Everybody Knows"	1999	Westlife	Westlife	check	check			
"Let's Make Tonight Special"	1999	Westlife	Westlife	check	check			
"Don't Fight It Baby"	1999	5ive	Invincible	check	check			
"Satisfied"	1998	5ive	5ive		check			
"When I Remember When"	1998	5ive	5ive		check			
"Let It Be Me"	1997	Damage	Forever	check	check			
"Forever"	1996	Damage	Forever	check	check			
