= Saturday Night, Sunday Morning (Jake Bugg album) =

Studio album by Jake Bugg
- Released: 20 August 2021
- Studio: Various
- Genre: Blues rock
- Length: 36:05
- Label: Sony Music Entertainment
- Producers: Happy Perez; Jamie Hartman; Steve Mac; Andrew Watt; Andrew Wells

Jake Bugg chronology
| Hearts That Strain (2017) | Saturday Night, Sunday Morning (2021) | A Modern Day Distraction (2024) |

Singles from Saturday Night, Sunday Morning
- 1. "Kiss Like the Sun" Released: 14 November 2019; 2. "All I Need" Released: 23 October 2020; 3. "Lost" Released: 7 May 2021; 4. "Downtown" Released: 23 July 2021

Saturday Night, Sunday Morning is the fifth studio album by English indie rock singer-songwriter Jake Bugg. It shares its name with Alan Sillitoe’s Saturday Night and Sunday Morning, a book about working-class life in Bugg's home of Nottingham. It has received mixed reviews from critics.

== Reception ==
According to the review aggregator Metacritic, Saturday Night, Sunday Morning received "mixed or average reviews" based on a weighted average score of 56 out of 100 from four critic scores. Editors at AllMusic rated this album 3.5 out of 5 stars, with critic Matt Collar writing that "it lacks some of the sincerity and lyricism that made 2017's Hearts That Strain such a welcome surprise", but balances Bugg's musical influences and is "the culmination of Bugg's rise to mainstream success". Writing for Clash, Finlay Holden scored this release a 7 out of 10, stating that "sonic experimentation breathes fresh life and energy into Bugg's discography, resulting in an intoxicating LP cementing his strongest offerings since his glorious debut". Writing for Gigwise, Kieran Macadie rated this release 8 out of 10 stars, writing that it displays Bugg's "iconic heartfelt lyricism and masterful guitar playing". In Hot Press, Lucy O'Toole scored Saturday Night, Sunday Morning a 6 out of 10, ending her review, "while there's no doubt that the Nottingham star is having plenty of fun here – and inviting us to do the same – there are surely bolder adventures on Bugg's horizon". Roisin O'Connor of The Independent called this release "a cohesive enough follow-up", but criticizes the combination of Bugg's sound with outside pop songwriters and rated this release 2 out of 5 stars.

In Metro Weekly, Sean Maurnier scored this release 3 out of 5 stars, stating that there is "definitely more of a radio-ready pop sensibility to it" than Bugg's previous music, but continuing that "swinging for more of a pop sound also produces some weird moments" and praising that "the album tends to be at its strongest on the tracks that showcase his indie rock sensibility and his gift for guitar work". El Hunt of NME gave this album 2 out of 5 stars, writing that "Bugg has struggled to replicate [the] raw charm" of his earliest work and criticizes the artist's shift toward pop music by stating that these songs "possesses about as much pizazz as a slightly feeble party popper". John Earls of Record Collector gave this album 3 out of 5 stars, calling this "a wholly satisfying album".

== Commercial performance ==
Saturday Night, Sunday Morning reached third place on the UK Albums Chart, his highest chart position since 2013's Shangri La, and fourth place in Scotland. Additional peaks include: 194 in Belgium's Flanders region, 139 in France's French Top Album Physiques chart, 95 in Germany, 58 in Ireland, and 45 in Switzerland.

== Track listing ==
1. "All I Need" (Jake Bugg and Steve Mac) – 3:36
2. "Kiss Like the Sun" (Bugg, Brian Lee, Ali Tamposi, and Andrew Wotman) – 2:55
3. "About Last Night" (Bugg, Nathan Perez, Tamposi, and Wotman) – 3:28
4. "Downtown" (Bugg, Jeff Cohen, and Jamie Hartman) – 3:24
5. "Rabbit Hole" (Bugg, Tobias Jesso Jr, and Andrew Wells) – 3:03
6. "Lost" (Bugg and Mac) – 3:28
7. "Scene" (Bugg, Jacob Kasher, Tamposi, and Wotman) – 3:59
8. "Lonely Hours" (Bugg and Hartman) – 2:40
9. "Maybe It's Today" (Bugg and Mac) – 3:09
10. "Screaming" (Bugg and Wells) – 3:27
11. "Hold Tight" (Bugg, Billy Walsh, and Wotman) – 2:56

== Personnel ==
"All I Need"

Recorded at Rokstone Studios, Parsons Green, Hammersmith and Fulham, London, England, United Kingdom
Mixed at Ninja Beat Club, Atlanta, Georgia, United States

- Jake Bugg – guitar, vocals
- Joy Farrukis – backing vocals
- Chris Laws – drums, engineering
- Layla Ley – backing vocals
- Steve Mac – keyboards, production
- Subrina McCalla – backing vocals
- John Parricelli – guitar
- Steve Pearce – bass guitar
- Danny Pursey – percussion, engineering
- Phil Tan – mixing
- Bill Zimmerman – additional engineering

"Kiss Like the Sun"

Recorded at Gold Tooth Music, Beverly Hills, California, United States and SARM Studios, London, England, United Kingdom
Mixed at The Mixsuite LA, Los Angeles, California, United States

- Jake Bugg – guitar, vocals
- Zvi "Angry Beard Man" Edelman – production coordination
- Michael Freeman – mixing assistance
- Paul LaMalfa – engineering
- Jeremy "Jboogs" Levin – production coordination
- Andrew "Schwifty" Luftman – production coordination
- Happy Perez – instrumentation, keyboards, guitar, programming, additional production
- Drew "Grey Poupon" Salamunovich – production coordination
- Samantha Corrie "SamCor" Schulman – production coordination
- Sarah "Goodie Bag" Shelton – production coordination
- David "Dsilb" Silberstein – production coordination
- Mark "Spike" Stent – mixing
- Andrew Watt – instrumentation, keyboards, guitar, programming

"About Last Night"

Recorded at Gold Tooth Music, Beverly Hills, California, United States and SARM Studios, London, England, United Kingdom
Mixed at The Mixsuite LA, Los Angeles, California, United States

- Jake Bugg – guitar, vocals
- Zvi "Angry Beard Man" Edelman – production coordination
- Michael Freeman – mixing assistance
- Paul LaMalfa – engineering
- Jeremy "Jboogs" Levin – production coordination
- Andrew "Schwifty" Luftman – production coordination
- Happy Perez – instrumentation, keyboards, guitar, programming, production
- Drew "Grey Poupon" Salamunovich – production coordination
- Samantha Corrie "SamCor" Schulman – production coordination
- Sarah "Goodie Bag" Shelton – production coordination
- David "Dsilb" Silberstein – production coordination
- Mark "Spike" Stent – mixing
- Andrew Watt – instrumentation, keyboards, bass guitar, guitar, drums, backing vocals, programming

"Downtown"

Recorded at The Village Recorders, Los Angeles, California, United States

- Jake Bugg – guitar, vocals
- Jamie Hartman – keyboards, strings, synthesizer, piano, mixing, production
- Davide Rossi – live strings

"Rabbit Hole"

Recorded at Electric Lady Studios in Greenwich Village, New York, New York, United States and Troy House
Mixed at Decoy Studios, Woodbridge, Suffolk, England, United Kingdom

- Jake Bugg – guitar, vocals
- Camden Clarke – mixing assistance
- Robert Sellens – mixing assistance
- Cenzo Townshend – mixing
- Andrew Watt – guitar, synthesizer, programming
- Andrew Wells – bass guitar, synthesizer, piano, drums, percussion
- Jon Yeston – acoustic guitar, engineering

"Lost"

Recorded at Rokstone Studios, Parsons Green, Hammersmith and Fulham, London, England, United Kingdom
Mixed at The Mixsuite LA, Los Angeles, California, United States

- Jake Bugg – guitar, vocals
- Joy Farrukis – backing vocals
- Chris Laws – drums, engineering
- Layla Ley – backing vocals
- Steve Mac – keyboards, production
- Subrina McCalla – backing vocals
- Danny Pursey – engineering
- Mark "Spike" Stent – mixing
- Matt Wolach – mixing assistance

"Scene"

Recorded at Gold Tooth Music, Beverly Hills, California, United States and SARM Studios, London, England, United Kingdom
Mixed at The Mixsuite LA, Los Angeles, California, United States

- Jake Bugg – guitar, vocals
- Zvi “Angry Beard Man” Edelman – production coordination
- Michael Freeman – mixing assistance
- Paul LaMalfa – engineering
- Jeremy "Jboogs" Levin – production coordination
- Andrew "Schwifty" Luftman – production coordination
- Drew "Grey Poupon" Salamunovich – production coordination
- Samantha Corrie "SamCor" Schulman – production coordination
- Sarah "Goodie Bag" Shelton – production coordination
- David "Dsilb" Silberstein – production coordination
- Mark "Spike" Stent – mixing
- Andrew Watt – instrumentation, bass guitar, piano, synthesizer, guitar, drums, backing vocals, programming
- Andrew Wells – percussion

"Lonely Hours"

Recorded at The Church Studios, London, England, United Kingdom
Mixed at Decoy Studios, Woodbridge, Suffolk, England, United Kingdom

- Jake Bugg – guitar, vocals
- Camden Clarke – mixing assistance
- Robert Sellens – mixing assistance
- Cenzo Townshend – mixing
- Andrew Watt – guitar, programming
- Andrew Wells – synthesizer, engineering
- Jon Yeston – engineering

"Maybe It's Today"

Recorded at Rokstone Studios, Parsons Green, Hammersmith and Fulham, London, England, United Kingdom

- Jake Bugg – guitar, vocals
- Joy Farrukis – backing vocals
- Chris Laws – drums, engineering
- Layla Ley – backing vocals
- Steve Mac – keyboards, mixing, production
- Subrina McCalla – backing vocals
- Danny Pursey – engineering

"Screaming"

Recorded at The Church Studios, London, England, United Kingdom and Frostbox Studios in Copenhagen, Capital Region of Denmark, Denmark
Mixed at Decoy Studios, Woodbridge, Suffolk, England, United Kingdom

- Jake Bugg – guitar, vocals
- Camden Clarke – mixing assistance
- Zach Dawes – bass guitar
- Kalle Mortensen – engineering
- Robert Sellens – mixing assistance
- Cenzo Townshend – mixing
- Andrew Watt – guitar, programming
- Andrew Wells – drums, engineering
- Jon Yeston – engineering

"Hold Tight"

Recorded at Gold Tooth Music, Beverly Hills, California, United States and SARM Studios, London, England, United Kingdom
Mixed at Gold Tooth Music, Beverly Hills, California, United States

- Jake Bugg – guitar, vocals
- Zvi "Angry Beard Man" Edelman – production coordination
- Paul LaMalfa – engineering, mixing
- Jeremy "Jboogs" Levin – production coordination
- Andrew "Schwifty" Luftman – production coordination
- Drew "Grey Poupon" Salamunovich – production coordination
- Samantha Corrie "SamCor" Schulman – production coordination
- Sarah "Goodie Bag" Shelton – production coordination
- David "Dsilb" Silberstein – production coordination
- Andrew Watt – instrumentation, bass guitar, piano, guitar, backing vocals, programming

== Charts ==
Chart performance for Saturday Night, Sunday Morning
| Chart (2021) | Peak position |
|---|---|
| Belgian Albums (Ultratop Flanders) | 194 |
| German Albums (Offizielle Top 100) | 95 |
| Irish Albums (IRMA) | 58 |
| Scottish Albums (Official Charts) | 4 |
| Swiss Albums (Schweizer Hitparade) | 45 |
| UK Albums (Official Charts) | 3 |
