= A Modern Day Distraction =

Studio album by Jake Bugg
- Released: 4 October 2024
- Genre: Indie rock
- Length: 39:50
- Labels: RCA; Sony
- Producers: Patrick Mascall; Mark Taylor

Jake Bugg chronology
Saturday Night, Sunday Morning (2021)	A Modern Day Distraction (2024)	Alamo (2026)

Singles from A Modern Day Distraction
- 1. "Zombieland" Released: 17 May 2024; 2. "All Kinds of People" Released: 5 July 2024; 3. "Keep On Moving" Released: 16 August 2024; 4. "I Wrote the Book" Released: 20 September 2024

A Modern Day Distraction is the sixth studio album by English indie rock singer-songwriter Jake Bugg. It was released on 4 October 2024 via RCA Records and Sony Music Entertainment. The album was originally slated for 20 September 2024, but was pushed back for unknown reasons. The album has received generally favourable reviews from critics. A deluxe edition was released on 7 November 2025.

== Reception ==
According to the review aggregator Metacritic, A Modern Day Distraction received "generally favourable reviews" with a weighted average score of 71 out of 100 based on four critic scores. Karl Blakesley of Clash says, "While it may ultimately be a solid rather than sensational listen, this is an enjoyable sixth outing from Jake Bugg that marks a reasonable return to form, while also providing more than a few strong highlights." Rachel Alm of Spectrum Culture says, "Bugg moves through a number of musical styles on A Modern Day Distraction and does them all well, which is impressive given how everything sounds consistent throughout and not as though Bugg is trying anything on."

== Commercial performance ==
A Modern Day Distraction peaked at number 9 on the Scottish Albums Chart, and number 14 on the UK Albums Chart. Although the album did not enter the French Album Top 200, it peaked at number 149 on the French Top Album Physiques (Top Physical Albums) chart.

== Track listing ==
Credits adapted from Tidal.

No.	Title	Lyrics	Producer	Length
1.	"Zombieland"	Jake Bugg; Patrick Mascall; Mark Taylor; Paul Barry	Mascall; Taylor	2:43
2.	"All Kinds of People"	Bugg; Mascall; Taylor; Barry	Mascall; Taylor	2:48
3.	"Breakout"	Bugg; Mascall; Taylor; Barry	Mascall; Taylor	2:32
4.	"Never Said Goodbye"	Bugg; Mascall; Taylor; Barry	Mascall; Taylor	3:38
5.	"I Wrote the Book"	Bugg; Mascall; Taylor; Barry	Mascall; Taylor	3:16
6.	"Waiting for the World"	Bugg; Mascall; Taylor; Barry	Mascall; Taylor	2:43
7.	"Instant Satisfaction"	Bugg; Mascall; Taylor; Barry	Mascall; Taylor	3:25
8.	"Got to Let You Go"	Bugg; Mascall; Taylor; Barry	Mascall; Taylor	3:14
9.	"All That I Needed Was You"	Bugg; Mascall; Taylor; Barry	Mascall; Taylor	3:17
10.	"Keep on Moving"	Bugg; Mascall; Taylor; Barry	Mascall; Taylor	2:51
11.	"Beyond the Horizon"	Bugg; Mascall; Taylor; Barry	Mascall; Taylor	4:12
12.	"Still Got Time"	Bugg; Mascall; Taylor; Barry	Mascall; Taylor	5:11
Total length:				39:50

== Charts ==
Chart performance for A Modern Day Distraction
Chart (2024)	Peak position
Scottish Albums (Official Charts)	9
UK Albums (Official Charts)	14

== Release history ==
Region	Release date	Format	Label
Various	4 October 2024	LP, CD, digital download	RCA Records; Sony Music Entertainment
