= Kiss Like the Sun =

2019 song

Single by Jake Bugg
- Released: 14 November 2019
- Length: 2:55
- Label: Sony Music
- Songwriter(s): Ali Tamposi; Andrew Wotman; Brian D Lee; Jake Bugg
- Producer(s): Andrew Watt

Jake Bugg singles chronology
| "Be Someone" (2019) | "Kiss Like the Sun" (2019) | "Saviours of the City" (2020) |

"Kiss Like the Sun" is a song recorded by English musician, singer, and songwriter Jake Bugg. It was released as a digital download and for streaming on 14 November 2019. The song was written by Ali Tamposi, Andrew Wotman, Brian D Lee and Jake Bugg.

== Background ==
On 12 November 2019, the song was selected as by BBC Radio 1's Annie Mac as her Hottest Record. Talking about the song, Bugg said, "I love working with Andrew Watt and I'm really pleased with the sound of this track. I wanted to write something that was fun and a bit light-hearted."

== Music video ==
A music video to accompany the release of "Kiss Like the Sun" was first released onto YouTube on 17 January 2020.

== Track listing ==
Digital download
| No. | Title | Length |
|---|---|---|
| 1. | "Kiss Like the Sun" | 2:55 |

Digital download
| No. | Title | Length |
|---|---|---|
| 1. | "Kiss Like the Sun" (Acoustic) | 2:55 |

== Personnel ==
Credits adapted from Tidal.

- Andrew Watt – Producer, all instruments, guitar, keyboards, programmer
- Ali Tamposi – Composer, lyricist
- Andrew Wotman – Composer, lyricist
- Brian D Lee – Composer, lyricist
- Jake Bugg – Composer, lyricist, associated performer, vocal
- Happy Perez – All Instruments, assistant engineer, guitar, keyboards, programmer
- Michael Freeman – Engineer
- Paul Lamalfa – Engineer
- Dave Kutch – Mastering Engineer
- Mark Stent – Mixing Engineer

== Charts ==
| Chart (2019–2020) | Peak position |
|---|---|
| Belgium (Ultratip Bubbling Under Flanders) | 28 |
| Belgium (Ultratip Bubbling Under Wallonia) | 38 |

== Release history ==
| Country | Date | Format | Label |
|---|---|---|---|
| Various | 14 November 2019 | Digital download; streaming | Sony Music |
