= It's About Us =

Studio album by Alex & Sierra
- Released: October 7, 2014
- Recorded: 2014
- Genre: Folk-pop
- Length: 42:03
- Label: Columbia, Syco
- Producer: Toby Gad; Martin Johnson; Julian Bunetta; John Shanks; John Ryan; Steve Mac; Ian Franzino; Steve Shebby; Johan Carlsson; Jamie Scott

Alex & Sierra chronology
It's About Us (2014)	As Seen On TV (2016)

Singles from It's About Us
- 1. "Scarecrow" Released: June 23, 2014; 2. "Little Do You Know" Released: October 6, 2014

It's About Us is the only studio album by American duo Alex & Sierra, released on October 7, 2014, by Columbia Records. Their debut single and the album's lead single "Scarecrow" was written by the duo along with Martin Johnson and Sam Hollander and was released on June 23, 2014, while "Little Do You Know" was released as the second single from the album.

The album debuted at number 8 on the Billboard 200 selling 27,000 copies within its first week of release.

== Background and development ==
In 2013, Alex & Sierra won Season 3 of The X Factor. Their prize included a $1 million recording contract from Sony Music Entertainment. Following their win on The X Factor, Alex & Sierra announced they would be making their debut album 'quick' and 'right'. They have worked with Julian Bunetta, Sam Watters, John Shanks, Toby Gad, Jason Mraz and One Direction member Harry Styles, Grammy award-winning singer/songwriter John Legend also made a contribution to the early stages of the album, however the track was not selected to be on the album. On May 3, 2014, Alex & Sierra revealed their debut single, "Scarecrow".

Alex & Sierra have commonly described the album as one that is not just filled with slow or upbeat songs. They hope it becomes one of those albums that you can listen to without the songs ever sounding the same. Also, in an interview with Glamour.com the two shared that they had never written a song before. The duo described it as a really laid-back and magical experience and added that they wrote a total of twenty songs in five days.

The first single "Scarecrow" was released on June 23, 2014, and was written by the duo, Martin Johnson and Sam Hollander. They described the single as "a song about hope, It's about believing in a relationship so strongly that a lack of communication isn't enough for you to give up on the other person. Everyone has trouble communicating sometimes... Or all the time, and everyone deserves to be believed in."

== Promotion ==
Alex & Sierra began promoting the album by performing on Today and Yahoo! Music on June 23, 2014, as part of the promotion for their single "Scarecrow". They also promoted the single on popular blogging sites such as perezhilton.com and rickey.org A lyric video featuring puppets instead of the singers themselves was released on May 27, 2014. While they released the official music video for the song on July 11, 2014.

== Reception ==
Professional ratings
Review scores
Source	Rating
AllMusic	3.5/5 stars

=== Critical ===
Matt Collar of AllMusic gave a positive review of the album stating "Alex & Sierra have delivered an album that showcases their crowd-pleasing musical chemistry."

=== Commercial ===
It's About Us debuted at number 9 on the New Zealand Albums Chart the week ending October 13, 2014. The album debuted at number 8 on the Billboard 200 with 27,000 copies sold within its first week of release. The album has sold 86,000 copies in the United States as of August 2016.

== Track listing ==
No.	Title	Writer(s)	Producer(s)	Length
1.	"Scarecrow"	Alex Kinsey; Sierra Deaton; Sam Hollander; Martin Johnson	Johnson	3:26
2.	"Give Me Something"	Kinsey; Deaton; Ruth-Anne Cunningham; John Ryan; Eddie Serrano	Julian Bunetta; Ryan	3:12
3.	"Bumper Cars"	Steve Mac; Claude Kelly	Mac	4:00
4.	"Almost Home"	Kinsey; Deaton; Cunningham; Hollander; John Shanks; Ali Tamposi	Shanks	3:23
5.	"Here We Go"	Kinsey; Deaton; Cunningham; Shanks; Julian Bunetta	Shanks; Bunetta	3:23
6.	"It's About Us" (Interlude)	Paul Cannon; Jason Mraz; Michael Natter		1:01
7.	"Little Do You Know"	Deaton; Cunningham; Tamposi; Toby Gad	Gad	3:05
8.	"Cheating"	Bunetta; Gad; Tamposi	Bunetta; Ian Franzino^{[a]}	2:27
9.	"Just Kids"	Kinsey; Deaton; Hollander; Tamposi; Ryan	Steve Shebby	3:28
10.	"I Love You"	Johan Carlsson; Harry Styles	Carlsson	3:49
11.	"Broken Frame"	Kinsey; Deaton; Hollander; Tamposi; Ryan	Bunetta; Ryan	3:40
12.	"Back to You"	Kinsey; Deaton; Jamie Scott	Scott	3:52
13.	"All for You"	Kinsey; Deaton; Cunningham; Ryan	Ryan	3:11
Total length:				42:03

Notes

- ^{^[a]} significes a co-producer

== Personnel ==
- Lead vocals – Alex & Sierra
- Background vocals – John August, Johan Carlsson, Sam Hollander, Martin Johnson, Kyle Moorman, Brandon Paddock, Ali Tamposi
- Violin – Paul Cartright, Stephan Hovsepian, Carrie Kennedy, Emily Moore, Joel Pargman, Jen Simone, Audrey Solomon, Ina Velli
- Guitar – Josh Cumbee, Toby Gad, Martin Johnson, Alex Kinsey, Jamie Scott, John Shanks
- Piano – Sierra Deaton, Toby Gad, Martin Johnson, Steve Mac, Jamie Scott, John Shanks,
- Cello – Ira Glansbeek, John Krovoza
- Trumpet – Sean Eric
- Percussion – Martin Johnson
- Rhythm/string arrangements – Nick Squires, Steve Mac
- Producers: Julian Bunetta, Johan Carlsson, Ian Franzino, Toby Gad, Steve Mac, John Ryan, John Shanks
- Vocal producers: Steve Shebby, Peter Carlsson, Steve Mac, David "DQ" Quinones
- Engineers: Nico Grossfield, John Hanes, Sam Holland, Martin Johnson, Paul Lamalfa, Chris Laws, Edwin Menjivar, Brandon Paddock, Dann Pursey, John Ryan, John Shanks
- Assistant engineers: Ian Franzino, Keith Munson
- Programming: Toby Gad, Martin Johnson, Kyle Moorman, Brandon Paddock, John Ryan, John Shanks, John August, Julian Bunetta, Johan Carlsson, Josh Cumbee
- Mixing: Michael H. Brauer, Serban Ghenea, Ash Howes, Joe Zook
- Mixing assistant: Ryan Lipman, Brandon Paddock
- Photography: Sierra Deaton, Sami Drasin, Alex Kinsey, Chris Whittle
- Artwork: Pamela Littky, Sierra Deaton, Alex Kinsey

== Charts ==
Chart (2014–16)	Peak position
Australian Albums Chart	97
Belgian Albums (Ultratop Flanders)	199
Canadian Albums Chart	11
New Zealand Albums Chart	9
US Billboard 200	8
US Digital Albums (Billboard)	3

== Release history ==
Region	Date	Label	Format
Australia	October 7, 2014	Columbia	Digital
Brazil	October 7, 2014	Columbia	Digital
United Kingdom	October 7, 2014	Columbia	Digital
United States	October 7, 2014	Columbia	Digital
