= Hearts That Strain =

Studio album by Jake Bugg
- Released: 1 September 2017
- Genre: Americana
- Length: 33:35
- Label: Virgin EMI
- Producers: Dan Auerbach, Jake Bugg

Jake Bugg chronology
On My One (2016)	Hearts That Strain (2017)	Saturday Night, Sunday Morning (2021)

Singles from Hearts That Strain
- 1. "How Soon the Dawn" Released: 4 August 2017; 2. "Waiting" Released: 13 October 2017; 3. "In the Event of My Demise" Released: 19 January 2018

Hearts That Strain is the fourth studio album by English indie rock singer-songwriter Jake Bugg. The album was released on 1 September 2017. Bugg has said: "Albums take you into their own sealed world. This time around I just wanted to write the tunes and record them with great musicians". The album received mixed reviews from critics.

== Track listing ==
All tracks are written by Jake Bugg.

No.	Title	Length
1.	"How Soon the Dawn"	2:48
2.	"Southern Rain"	3:54
3.	"In the Event of My Demise"	2:54
4.	"This Time"	3:15
5.	"Waiting" (featuring Noah Cyrus)	3:11
6.	"The Man on Stage"	3:17
7.	"Hearts That Strain"	3:34
8.	"Burn Alone"	2:40
9.	"Indigo Blue"	3:28
10.	"Bigger Love"	2:56
11.	"Every Colour in the World"	3:57
Total length:		35:54

== Charts ==
Chart (2017)	Peak position
Australian Albums (ARIA)	44
Belgian Albums (Ultratop Flanders)	37
Belgian Albums (Ultratop Wallonia)	102
French Albums (SNEP)	165
Irish Albums (IRMA)	62
New Zealand Heatseeker Albums (RMNZ)	10
Swiss Albums (Schweizer Hitparade)	80
UK Albums (Official Charts)	7
