= On My One =

Studio album by Jake Bugg
- Released: 17 June 2016
- Genre: Indie rock
- Length: 33:25
- Labels: Virgin EMI Records, Island (US)
- Producers: Jake Bugg, Jacknife Lee

Jake Bugg chronology
Messed Up Kids (2014)	On My One (2016)	Hearts That Strain (2017)

Singles from On My One
- 1. "On My One" Released: 16 February 2016; 2. "Gimme the Love" Released: 26 February 2016; 3. "Love, Hope and Misery" Released: 6 May 2016; 4. "Bitter Salt" Released: 27 May 2016; 5. "Put Out the Fire/The Love We’re Hoping For" Released: 23 December 2016

On My One is the third studio album by English indie rock singer-songwriter Jake Bugg. The album was released on 17 June 2016.

== Title ==
The title "On My One" derives from a Nottingham dictum meaning "On My Own". Bugg said "In a lot of ways, it sums up this record because it mainly has been me on my own. I saw this as the logical next step in my development as a songwriter. It was a challenge but something I felt I had to do."

== Recording and release ==
In a 2014 interview with Mr Wavvy, Bugg announced that he had begun work on a new studio album. On whether or not it would be released in 2014, Bugg stated "That's the beauty of making records, you just never know when it's gonna be ready. I didn't think this second album's gonna be as ready as soon as it was but it just so happened." He did not specify whether or not he would be working with Rubin again, only that he is currently in the songwriting process. In July 2014, Jake Bugg revealed he had already started working on his third studio album. That same month, he was also at the River Stage at Ottawa Bluesfest and performed at Paléo Festival near the Lake Geneva in Switzerland. On 5 October 2014, at Cardiff, he played for the first time two new songs: "Down the Avenue" and "Hold On You". Speaking with NME in early 2015, Jake said that he was working on his third album, of which "the content of the songs was much darker" than earlier work. On 16 February 2016 he released the song "On My One" for free. On 25 February his new single, "Gimme the Love", debuted at BBC 1. Jake Bugg also talked about the forthcoming album, calling it On My One and announcing its release for June. On 26 February he announced the album would be released on 17 June, also sharing the track listing and the artwork.

Promoting the album for Radio 1's Big Weekend in May 2016, Bugg premiered "Bitter Salt" and revealed he performed the majority of the instrumentation. Bugg also confirmed he produced a majority of the album on his own, though Irish producer Jacknife Lee joined Bugg for three tracks.

"Gimme the Love" was featured in Codemasters game, Dirt 4 in 2017.

== Critical reception ==
Professional ratings
Aggregate scores
Source	Rating
Metacritic	59/100
Review scores
Source	Rating
AllMusic	2.5/5 stars
Clash	(8/10)
Drowned in Sound	(4/10)
The Independent	3/5 stars
NME	3/5 stars
Pitchfork	(3.0/10)

On My One has received mixed reviews from the press. At Metacritic, which assigns a normalized rating out of 100 to reviews from mainstream critics, the album received an average score of 59. Pitchfork gave the album 3 out of 10, paying particular attention to the fact that the album was largely self-produced, stating "On My One is precisely the kind of mistake that pop stars make when they think they’re smarter than the system", whilst Drowned in Sound called the album "astonishingly derivative" and "disappointingly uninteresting". Dork criticised the album's lack of focus, accusing it of "awkwardly stumbling from one pseudo-form of a genre to another". Clash Magazine gave a positive review (8/10) stating the album was "unpredictably diverse and unexpectedly personal, this album sees Bugg managing to maintain the relatable style which won him so many fans in the first place" and also praising his ability to try his hand at other genres, stating the gamble "well and truly paid off"; Q Magazine also gave the album 8/10 stating "What binds these seemingly disparate musical elements together are the lyrics". The Independent gave 3/5 concluding that its "not quite as potent as Shangri La, but it constitutes a confident negotiation of the 'difficult third album' hurdle."

== Track listing ==
All tracks are written by Jake Bugg.

No.	Title	Length
1.	"On My One"	2:15
2.	"Gimme the Love"	3:02
3.	"Love, Hope and Misery"	4:00
4.	"The Love We're Hoping For"	3:08
5.	"Put Out the Fire"	2:17
6.	"Never Wanna Dance"	3:31
7.	"Bitter Salt"	3:07
8.	"Ain't No Rhyme"	3:23
9.	"Livin' Up Country"	2:58
10.	"All That"	2:42
11.	"Hold on You"	3:02
Total length:		33:25

== Charts ==
Chart performance for On My One
Chart (2016)	Peak position
Australian Albums (ARIA)	16
Austrian Albums (Ö3 Austria)	17
Belgian Albums (Ultratop Flanders)	19
Belgian Albums (Ultratop Wallonia)	48
Dutch Albums (Album Top 100)	48
French Albums (SNEP)	87
German Albums (Offizielle Top 100)	27
Greek Albums (IFPI)	70
Irish Albums (IRMA)	19
New Zealand Heatseekers Albums (RMNZ)	1
Scottish Albums (Official Charts)	4
Spanish Albums (Promusicae)	98
Swiss Albums (Schweizer Hitparade)	17
UK Albums (Official Charts)	4
UK Album Downloads (Official Charts)	8
