= The Homesman (soundtrack) =

The Homesman (Original Motion Picture Soundtrack)

Film score by Marco Beltrami
- Released: November 18, 2014
- Recorded: 2014
- Genre: Film score
- Length: 45:34
- Label: Varèse Sarabande
- Producer: Marco Beltrami

Marco Beltrami chronology
The Drop (2014)	The Homesman (Original Motion Picture Soundtrack) (2014)	The Woman in Black: Angel of Death (2014)

The Homesman (Original Motion Picture Soundtrack) is the soundtrack to the 2014 film The Homesman directed by Tommy Lee Jones, who also starred in the lead role with Hilary Swank and Meryl Streep. The film's original score was composed by Marco Beltrami, performed by the Hollywood Studio Symphony and released through Varèse Sarabande digitally on November 18, 2014 and physically on December 9.

== Development ==
Marco Beltrami composed the film's score, who previously worked with Jones on The Three Burials of Melquiades Estrada (2005) and The Sunset Limited (2011); he was involved in the project way before the film began production, where Jones told him about the script during pre-production. He developed few ideas when the film began production and had some verse in the script which needed Mary Bee (Swank) to sing that served as her theme. The theme was curated on providing the authenticity to the time period where he wanted to do something that Bee could have song. Despite the difficulties on writing music on set and inspired until watching the final edit which inspired him visually. Jones insisted him to find authentic source of inspiration for the music, as he was open to experimentation and creative work. Writing music for the film's script would refrain using temp tracks and could assemble and fit the specific pieces into the edit and exclude the cue if it did not work with the film.

The mid-19th century was a spare time in American music which had him to develop themes from the folk tunes of the period and orchestrated to reflect the austere nature of the landscape and the characters. He further wanted to evoke the loneliness and desolation of the homesteaders as the characters were driven insane by the life which surrounded them, adding that "the ever-present wind on the plains seemed like a manifestation of that solitude and was a source of inspiration for me"; to achieve that, Beltrami and Buck Sanders constructed a wind piano after exploring multiple ways to capture the particular sound. He recalled that he put up an ordinary piano on the hill by his studio in Malibu whose wires were attached to water tanks 175 feet uphill that resonated with the wind flow which felt like drawing out of the wind's essence. He found it to be very effective and served as the signature sound of the score.

The score was recorded outside his studio, against his norm as recording within the confines of the studio worked against the film. Beltrami set up a small ensemble of strings and percussion outside where the sounds would be dissipated, and the environmental noises provide the right feel. By borrowing sound archivist Tony Schwartz's technique to use natural noise of the environment to build musical compositions where the harmonic elements of the landscape served as the inspiration and used simple pieces of wood as traditional orchestral instruments. Despite the biblical references, Beltrami did not use overtly Christian music but enhanced the film's scope and provided a deeper meaning, but he did not reference religious themes musically other than hymns.

== Critical reception ==
Pete Simons of Synchrotones described that Beltrami "has certainly created a unique and mesmerising soundscape for this film, with a fantastic main theme." James Southall of Movie Wave wrote "It's great to hear a composer as talented as Beltrami be allowed by a literate director to be creative and do his own thing." Glenn Heath Jr. of Little White Lies described it as a "yearning string score". Peter Debruge of Variety reviewed that Beltrami's themes were "hauntingly underscored". Andrew O'Hehir of Salon.com called it as "haunting, unsettling". Ty Burr of The Boston Globe wrote "Marco Beltrami's score breaks out the full battalion of strings."

== Track listing ==
The Homesman (Original Motion Picture Soundtrack) track listing
No.	Title	Length
1.	"The Homesman Main Title"	3:52
2.	"On the Plains"	1:35
3.	"Newborn"	1:31
4.	"Picking Up Arrabella Sours"	1:33
5.	"Sod Buster"	1:32
6.	"Bathtime"	2:53
7.	"Pawnee"	2:13
8.	"Bury Doll"	1:55
9.	"River Crossing"	2:52
10.	"Leaving Home Flashback"	1:06
11.	"Are You Crazy?"	1:46
12.	"Travel Montage"	0:46
13.	"It's Abandoned"	1:53
14.	"Cuddy Lost"	3:13
15.	"Where's Cuddy?"	1:35
16.	"I'll Be Back Directly"	3:03
17.	"Entering Town"	2:21
18.	"Briggs Moves On"	2:00
19.	"Onto the Ferry"	2:10
20.	"The Homesman End Credits"	3:18
21.	"Wind Haiku"	2:27
Total length:		45:34

== Accolades ==
Accolades for The Homesman (Original Motion Picture Soundtrack)
Year	Award	Category	Recipient(s)	Result
2014	World Soundtrack Awards	Soundtrack Composer of the Year	Marco Beltrami	Nominated
2014	International Film Music Critics Association	Film Composer of the Year	Marco Beltrami	Nominated
2014	International Film Music Critics Association	Best Original Score for a Drama Film	Marco Beltrami	Won
