= Alamo (Jake Bugg album) =

Studio album by Jake Bugg
- Released: 13 November 2026
- Length: 38:28
- Labels: Thirty Tigers; Lovebugg
- Producer: Jimmy Hogarth

Jake Bugg chronology
| A Modern Day Distraction (2024) | Alamo (2026) |

Singles from Alamo
- 1. "Never Can Tell" Released: 2 September 2026; 2. "Day by Day" Released: 14 October 2026

Alamo is the seventh studio album by the English singer-songwriter Jake Bugg. It was released on 13 November 2026 via Thirty Tigers and Lovebugg Recording. The album was preceded by two singles: "Never Can Tell" and "Day by Day".

== Background and release ==
Alamo is Bugg's first independent release, and marks his return to his folk-leaning roots, and includes lyricism that describes him overcoming recent hardships. In the album's announcement, Bugg states, "After all the years of touring and making records, it just felt like the right time to look inward. The last couple of years have been tough for me and I've had a lot of struggles. I'm trying to navigate those and figure out where they stem from."

He continues, "Alamo was only going to work if I was going to be honest and be as vulnerable as possible. I've always had a lot of defences and barriers around me. I thought it was time to bring those down." The lead single, "Never Can Tell", was released on 2 September 2026, which includes nods to Bob Dylan and Leonard Cohen, with Bugg in the song exploring how friendships can change after finding success. The album's second single, "Day by Day", was released on 14 October 2026. The album's opening track, "When the Night", became available on streaming platforms on 10 November 2026, three days before the album's release on 13 November 2026.

== Critical reception ==
According to the review aggregator Metacritic, Alamo received "universal acclaim" with a weighted average score of 84 out of 100 based on four critic scores. Matt Collar of AllMusic highlights the "upbeat moments" in "Never Can Tell" and "Trapped in a Cage", but underscores that "it's Bugg's knack for bittersweet lyricism and the last-stand emotionality of Alamo that you'll want to remember." John Moore of Glide Magazine says of the record, "It's a stripped-down, deeply personal record that proves he needs little more than his voice and an acoustic guitar to make an emotional impact."

== Track listing ==
All tracks are written by Jake Kennedy, James Hogarth, and Steve McEwan, except "Cloud in the Sky" (written by Kennedy).

Alamo track listing
| No. | Title | Length |
|---|---|---|
| 1. | "When the Night" | 2:48 |
| 2. | "Never Can Tell" | 2:57 |
| 3. | "Alamo" | 3:30 |
| 4. | "The Life" | 2:24 |
| 5. | "Trapped in a Cage" | 2:37 |
| 6. | "Ten Stories High" | 3:25 |
| 7. | "Tall Poppies" | 3:44 |
| 8. | "Drop in the Water" | 3:57 |
| 9. | "Cloud in the Sky" | 5:52 |
| 10. | "Day by Day" | 2:07 |
| 11. | "Everywhere I Go" | 4:50 |
| Total length: | | 38:28 |

== Personnel ==
These credits are adapted from Tidal.

- Jake Bugg – lead vocals (all tracks), acoustic guitar (tracks 2–11), piano (10), arrangement (11)
- Jimmy Hogarth – bass guitar, production, engineering, mixing (all tracks); electric guitar (1, 2, 5–7, 11), percussion (1, 2, 5, 7, 8, 10), piano (1, 2, 5, 7, 9), acoustic guitar (1, 9), guitars (3); drums (8), slide guitar (8)
- Emre Ramazanoglu – mastering
- Reuben Nixey – drums (1, 2, 5)
- Steve McEwan – acoustic guitar (2–6, 8–11), background vocals (8)
- Sally Herbert – arrangement (11)

== Charts ==
Chart performance for Alamo
| Chart (2026) | Peak position |
|---|---|
| Belgian Albums (Ultratop Flanders) | 196 |
| Belgian Albums (Ultratop Wallonia) | 114 |
| Scottish Albums (Official Charts) | 2 |
| UK Albums (Official Charts) | 8 |
| UK Americana Albums (Official Charts) | 2 |
| UK Independent Albums (Official Charts) | 1 |

== Release history ==
| Region | Release date | Format | Label |
|---|---|---|---|
| Various | 13 November 2026 | LP; CD; cassette; digital download | Thirty Tigers; Lovebugg Recording |
