= All I Need (Jake Bugg song) =

2020 song

Single by Jake Bugg
- Released: 23 October 2020
- Length: 3:36
- Label: Sony Music
- Songwriters: Jake Bugg; Steve Mac
- Producer: Steve Mac

Jake Bugg singles chronology
"Rabbit Hole" (2020)	"All I Need" (2020)

"All I Need" is a song recorded by English musician, singer, and songwriter Jake Bugg. It was released as a digital download and for streaming on 23 October 2020.

== Background ==
The song was written by Jake Bugg and Steve Mac, who also produced the song. Talking about the song, Bugg said, "'All I Need' is about a moment of satisfaction or clarity. A feeling that comes when you are completely engaged in what you are doing, however you arrived there."

== Live performances ==
On 15 January 2021, Bugg performed the song live on The Graham Norton Show.

== Music video ==
A music video to accompany the release of "All I Need" was first released onto YouTube on 29 November 2020.

== Track listing ==
Digital download
No.	Title	Length
1.	"All I Need"	3:36

Digital download
No.	Title	Length
1.	"All I Need" (Rudimental Remix)	3:04

Digital download
No.	Title	Length
1.	"All I Need" (Franky Wah Remix)	3:28

== Personnel ==
Credits adapted from Tidal.

- Steve Mac – Producer, composer, lyricist, keyboards
- Jake Bugg – Composer, lyricist, associated performer, guitar, vocal
- Joy Farrukis – Background Vocal
- Layla Ley – Background Vocal
- Subrina McCalla – Background Vocal
- Steve Pearce – Bass Guitar
- Chris Laws – Drums, engineer
- Bill Zimmerman – Engineer
- Dann Pursey – Engineer, percussion
- John Parricelli – Guitar
- Randy Merrill – Mastering Engineer
- Phil Tan – Mixing Engineer

== Charts ==
Chart (2020–2021)	Peak position
Belgium (Ultratip Bubbling Under Flanders)	18
Scotland Singles (OCC)	86
Switzerland Airplay (Schweizer Hitparade)	91
UK Singles Downloads (OCC)	9

== Certifications ==
Region	Certification	Certified units/sales
United Kingdom (BPI)	Silver	200,000^{‡}
^{‡} Sales+streaming figures based on certification alone.

== Release history ==
Country	Date	Format	Label
Various	23 October 2020	Digital download; streaming	Sony Music
