= Jake Bugg =

English singer-songwriter (born 1994)

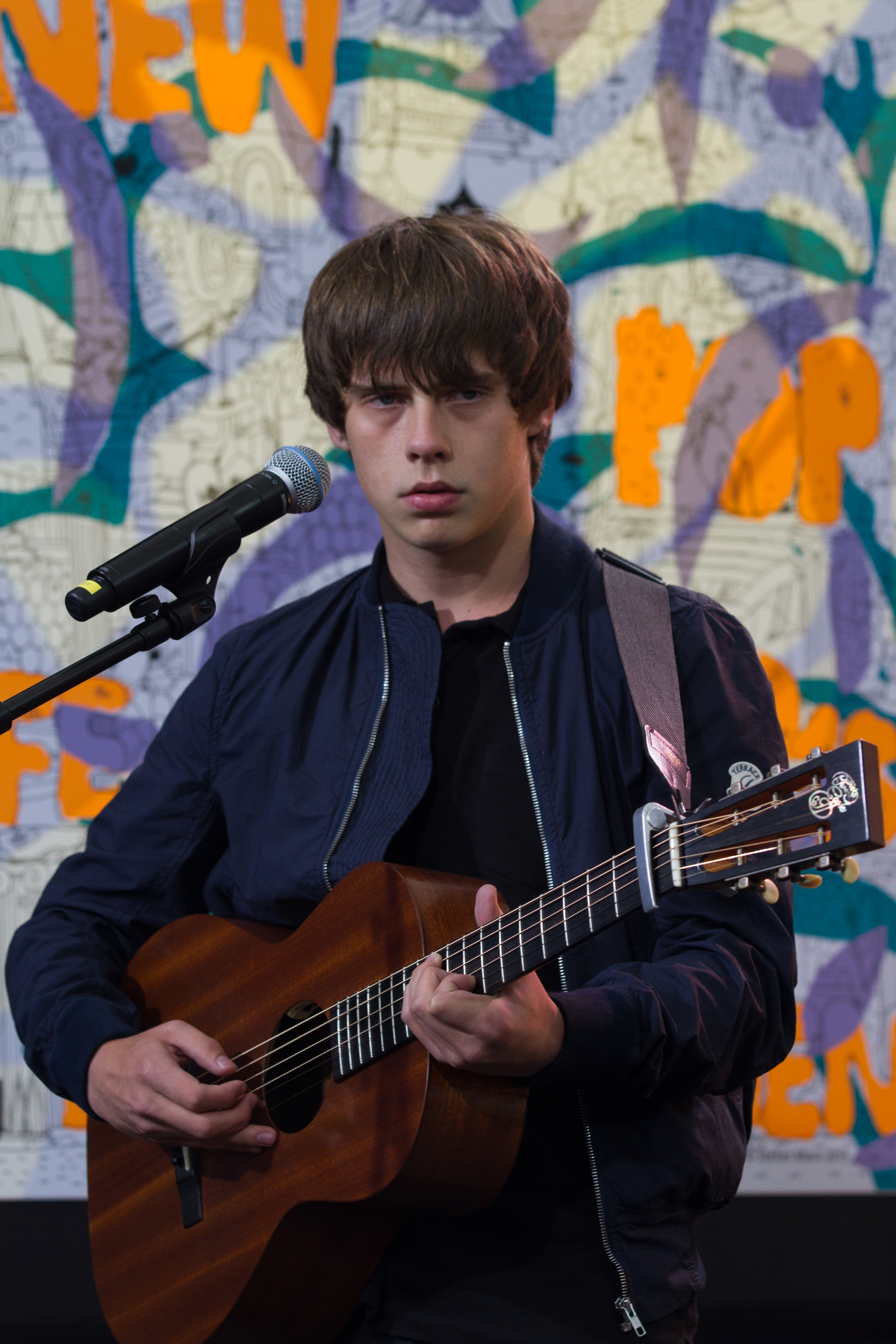
- Bugg performing at the SWR3 New Pop Festival in Baden-Baden, 2013

Background information
- Born: Jake Edwin Charles Kennedy; 28 February 1994 (age 32); Nottingham, England
- Genres: Indie rock; indie folk; Americana; blues rock
- Occupations: Singer-songwriter; musician
- Instruments: Vocals; guitar; piano
- Years active: 2011–present
- Labels: Mercury; RCA; Thirty Tigers
- Website: jakebugg.com

Jake Edwin Charles Kennedy (born 28 February 1994), known professionally as Jake Bugg, is an English singer-songwriter. His self-titled debut album, Jake Bugg, some of which was co-written with songwriter Iain Archer, was released in October 2012 and reached number one on the UK Albums Chart. His second album, Shangri La, was released in November 2013, and his third, largely self-produced album, On My One, in June 2016. His fourth album, Hearts That Strain, a largely acoustic effort produced by Dan Auerbach, was released in September 2017.

After a four-year gap, in August 2021, Bugg released the more pop-influenced fifth album, Saturday Night, Sunday Morning. Three years later, in October 2024, Bugg released his sixth album, A Modern Day Distraction. His seventh and most recent album, Alamo, was released in November 2026.

== Early life ==
Jake Bugg was born Jake Edwin Charles Kennedy in Nottingham to musical parents who separated when he was young. His father, David Bugg, was a nurse, and his mother worked in sales, both parents having previously made recordings. He grew up in the Clifton council estate of Nottingham and started playing guitar at the age of 12 after being introduced to the instrument by his uncle Mark. He attended Farnborough School Technology College in Clifton. He has described a formative musical moment when, aged 12, he heard Don McLean's "Vincent (Starry, Starry Night)" on an episode of The Simpsons. He was enrolled in a music technology course but, by the age of 16, he had dropped out and was writing and performing his own songs.

== Career ==
=== 2011: Beginnings ===
Bugg was selected to perform on the "BBC Introducing" stage at the 2011 Glastonbury Festival at age 16 after submitting material to their website, and subsequently signed to Mercury Records. His songs were then placed on various BBC Radio playlists, with "Country Song" being used in a national TV beer commercial for Greene King IPA.

=== 2012: Jake Bugg ===
Bugg's self-titled debut album was released on 15 October 2012. Talking about Bugg and his debut, Clash hailed the "precocious talent fusing retro folk with blistering contemporary rock riffs". On 21 October 2012 the song "Two Fingers" charted at 28 in the UK while the album reached number one in the UK charts. The album has sold 604,100 copies in the United Kingdom and is the 57th best selling album of the 2010s decade. Bugg's touring band drummer Jack Atherton and bassist Tom "Robbo" Robertson performed on five songs on the album.

On 22 May 2012, Bugg appeared on the BBC music programme Later... with Jools Holland. In August 2012, Bugg was a support act for Noel Gallagher's High Flying Birds at Belsonic Music Festival, Belfast. On 1 October 2012, he performed live on the BBC Radio 6 Music programme Live at Maida Vale.

=== 2013–2014: Shangri La ===
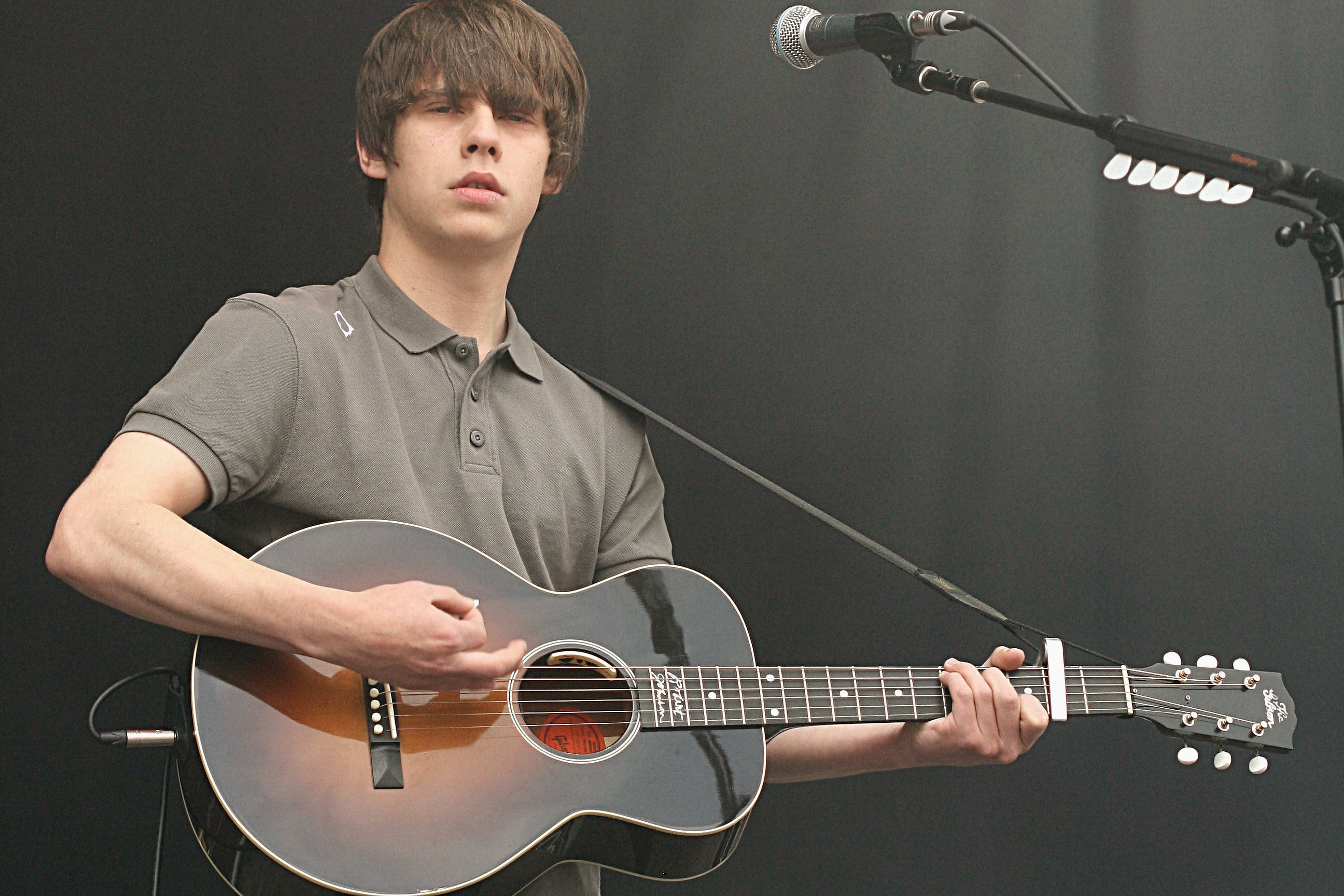
Bugg performing at Rock im Park, June 2013

Bugg had been in Malibu working with Rick Rubin and Iain Archer, and had had some interactions with Chad Smith from the Red Hot Chili Peppers, working on the drums to some of his songs, including the single "Broken". On 8 September 2013, Bugg tweeted, "2nd album done! Hope you're all well!" On 23 September 2013, Bugg announced his new album, Shangri La, along with a new single, "What Doesn't Kill You". Shangri La was released on 18 November 2013. This album is named after the studio Bugg recorded it in. As well as Chad Smith, Shangri La includes Elvis Costello's drummer Pete Thomas. The album generally received positive reviews from the music community. Bugg was one of five nominees for the 2013 Brit Award for "British Breakthrough Act", which was voted on by BBC Radio 1 listeners. The award was won by Ben Howard.

On 28 June, Bugg performed an afternoon set on the Pyramid Stage at the 2013 Glastonbury Festival, making him the first artist that has moved from the BBC Introducing Stage to the Main Pyramid stage in successive years. On 12 July, Bugg played the Radio 1 Stage at T in the Park. On 13 July, he supported the Rolling Stones at Hyde Park in London. On 20 July, Bugg headlined at the Splendour festival in Nottingham. On 2 August, Bugg performed at the Osheaga Festival in the Parc Jean-Drapeau, Montreal, Quebec. On 23–25 August, Bugg performed at the Reading and Leeds Festival on the Radio 1/NME stage. On 13 October, Bugg performed at the Fonda Theatre in Hollywood, California. That same month, he was also at the River Stage at Ottawa Bluesfest and performed at the Paléo Festival near Lake Geneva in Switzerland.

In February 2014, Bugg performed at the Royal Albert Hall in London and was joined on stage by Johnny Marr and Michael Kiwanuka.

On 5 October 2014, at Cardiff, he played for the first time two new songs: "Down the Avenue" and "Hold on You". A new song, "Feel What's Good", was used on the soundtrack of the film The Giver.

Bugg's song "Simple As This" was featured in the film The Fault in Our Stars. The song "Me and You" was featured in the film Dumb and Dumber To.

=== 2016: On My One ===
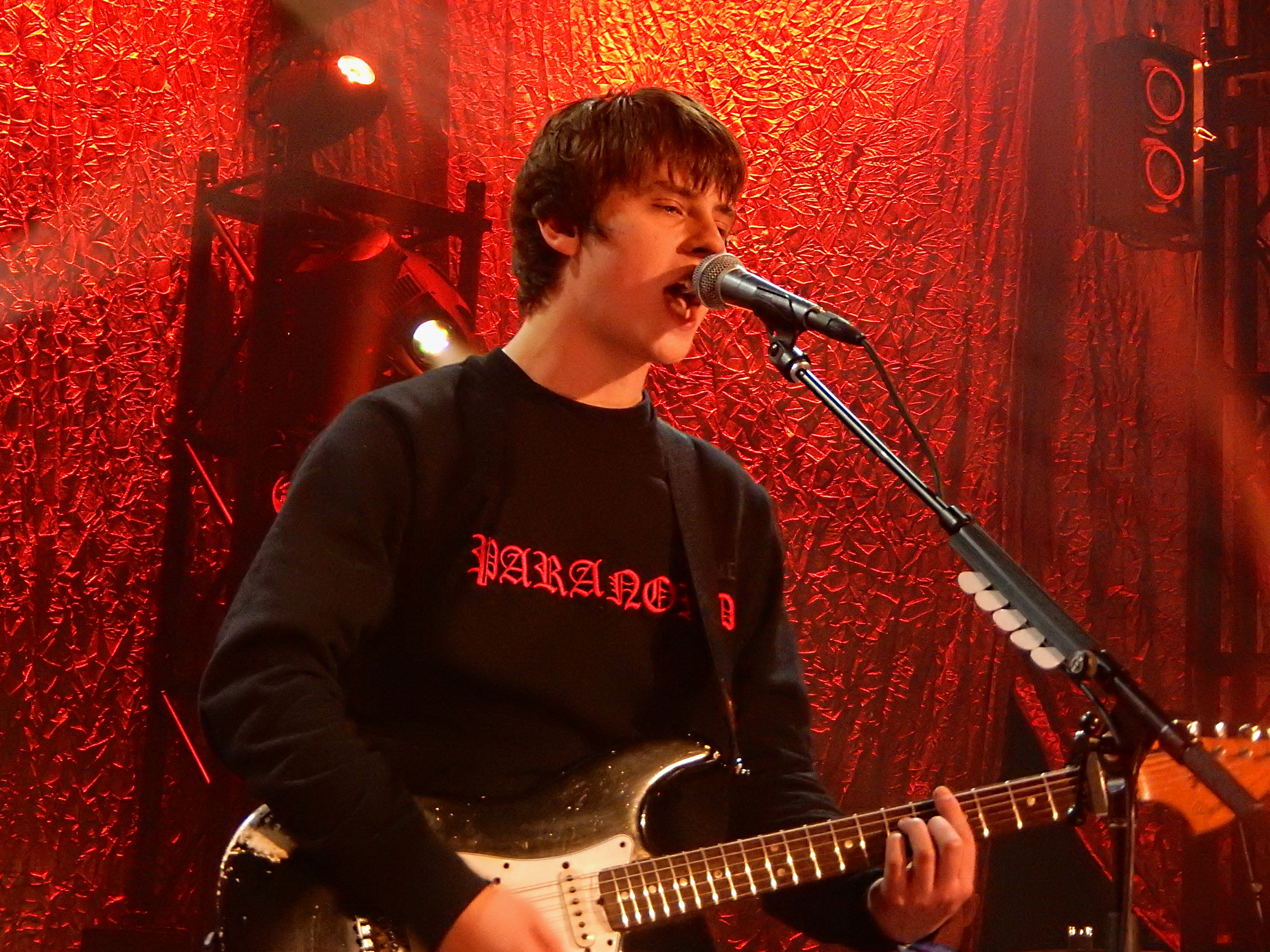
Bugg performing in Brighton, May 2016

Speaking to NME in early 2015, Bugg said that he was working on his third album, of which "the content of the songs was much darker" than earlier work. On the 16 February 2016 he released free of charge a new song: "On My One". On 25 February, his new single "Gimme the Love" debuted on BBC Radio 1. Bugg also talked about the forthcoming album On My One, announcing its release for June. On 26 February, he announced the album would be released on 17 June. He also shared the track list and revealed the artwork. In May 2016, a number of tour dates in London and Nottingham for June were announced. His 2012 single "Trouble Town" was used as the theme for each of the three BBC TV series Happy Valley broadcast in 2014, 2016 and 2023.

=== 2017: Hearts That Strain ===
On 2 August 2017, Bugg's new single "How Soon the Dawn" was played on BBC Radio 1, hosted by Annie Mac. On 4 August, Bugg released the single on all platforms with a music video. He later announced his fourth studio album titled Hearts That Strain. It was released on 1 September 2017. He will embark on an acoustic tour through November to support the new album. Bugg also released a piano-laden song with the American singer Noah Cyrus called "Waiting".

In December 2018, Bugg signed to Sony's RCA label in a bid to relaunch his career.

=== 2021: Saturday Night, Sunday Morning ===
On 26 October 2020, Bugg issued the single "All I Need". The song followed "Rabbit Hole" and "Saviours Of The City", the latter of which was the Nottingham singer-songwriter's first new music of 2020 when it was shared in April. He accompanied the release with a short film.

On 19 March 2021, it was announced that Bugg was due to release his fifth album, Saturday Night, Sunday Morning, in August 2021, featuring previously released singles "All I Need" and "Kiss Like the Sun". The album, his first effort under the Sony RCA label, was expected to be accompanied by a UK tour in Spring 2022.

Bugg then joined Liam Gallagher and John Squire as a special guest on their international tour, which commenced in March 2024 in promotion of their new self-titled album.

Bugg played guitar on the Johnny Blue Skies album Passage du Desir in 2024.

=== 2024: A Modern Day Distraction ===
On 4 October 2024, Bugg released his sixth studio album A Modern Day Distraction under RCA Records. It was originally announced on 17 May 2024 to release on 20 September 2024, pre-order available, but the release date was pushed back for unknown reasons. With hints of rock and pop, this album features lots of guitars and a "lively, spontaneous feel."

Bugg announced the dates of the Modern Day Distraction U.S. tour, with tickets going on sale on July 19. There were four different shows with locations in New York, Illinois, Tennessee, and California, with dates in early to mid October, just days after the album was released.

The lead single of the album, "Zombieland", and its official video were released the same day the album was announced, and was also the first song written on the album.

Bugg said himself that he had started working on his seventh album, weeks before A Modern Day Distraction had come out.

=== 2026: Alamo ===
On 13 November 2026, Bugg released his seventh studio album Alamo under Thirty Tigers and his own label, Lovebugg Recording. The album is Bugg's first independent release, and marks his return to his folk-leaning roots, and includes lyricism that describes him overcoming recent hardships. Alamo is preceded by two singles: "Never Can Tell" and "Day by Day".

== Personal life and sponsorship ==
In April 2013, Bugg was reported to be in a relationship with English model, actress, and singer Cara Delevingne. In 2017, it was reported that Bugg was in a relationship with model Roxy Horner. The couple parted two years later.

In June 2017, Bugg was confirmed as the shirt sponsor of his favourite and local football team, Notts County, taking the November slot in a season-long rotation. In September 2020, the club announced that Bugg would sponsor their away shirt during the 2020–2021 season.

== Discography ==
Studio albums

- Jake Bugg (2012)
- Shangri La (2013)
- On My One (2016)
- Hearts That Strain (2017)
- Saturday Night, Sunday Morning (2021)
- A Modern Day Distraction (2024)
- Alamo (2026)

== Television appearances ==
Year	Television show	Performing	Description
	BBC 2 The Review Show	"Trouble Town"	January 2012
2012	Later... with Jools Holland	"Trouble Town", "Country Song" & "Lightning Bolt"	Series 40, Episode 6
2012	Hootenanny	"Lightning Bolt" & "Two Fingers"	Annual Hootenanny 2012–2013
2013	Conan	"Two Fingers"	17 January 2013
2013	The Ellen DeGeneres Show	"Lightning Bolt"	Series 10, Episode 129
2013	The Graham Norton Show	"Broken"	Series 13, Episode 13
2013	Late Show with David Letterman	"Lightning Bolt"	Series 20, Episode 129
2013	The Tonight Show with Jay Leno	"Lightning Bolt"	Series 21, Episode 68
2013	Conan	"What Doesn't Kill You"	1 October 2013
2013	Later... with Jools Holland	"What Doesn't Kill You", "Slumville Sunrise" & "A Song About Love"	Series 43, Episode 4
2013	The Tonight Show with Jay Leno	"What Doesn't Kill You"	Series 21, Episode 206
2014	The Graham Norton Show	"A Song About Love"	Series 14, Episode 11
2014	The Ellen DeGeneres Show	"A Song About Love"	Series 11, Episode 91
2014	American Idol	"Me and You"	Series 13, Episode 15
2014	The Tonight Show Starring Jimmy Fallon	"Me and You"	14 March 2014
2016	Jimmy Kimmel Live!	"Gimme the Love", "Lightning Bolt"	March 15, 2016
2016	Late Night with Seth Meyers	"Love, Hope and Misery"	June 7, 2016
2016	The Andrew Marr Show	"Love, Hope and Misery"	19 June 2016
2021	The Graham Norton Show	"All I Need"	Series 28, Episode 13

== Awards and nominations ==
Year	Organisation	Award	Nominated	Result
2013	BRIT Awards	British Breakthrough Act	Himself	Nominated
2013	Žebřík Music Awards	Best International Discovery	Himself	Nominated
2013	NME Awards	Best Solo Artist	Himself	Nominated
2013	NME Awards	Best Album	Jake Bugg	Nominated
2013	Ivor Novello Awards	Best Song Musically and Lyrically	"Two Fingers"	Nominated
2013	Q Awards	Best New Act	Himself	Won
2013	Q Awards	Best Solo Artist	Himself	Nominated
2013	Mercury Prize	Album of the Year	Jake Bugg	Nominated
2013	European Festival Awards	Newcomer of the year	Himself	Nominated
2014	BRIT Awards	British Male Solo Artist	Himself	Nominated
2014	NME Awards	Best Solo Artist	Himself	Nominated
2014	Q Awards	Best Solo Artist	Himself	Nominated
2014	Capricho Awards	International Singer	Himself	Nominated
2014	Japan Gold Disc Award	Best Three New Artist	Himself	Won
2015	NME Awards	Best Solo Artist	Himself	Won
2015	Silver Clef Award	Best Male	Himself	Won
