= Why Don't We discography =

Discography

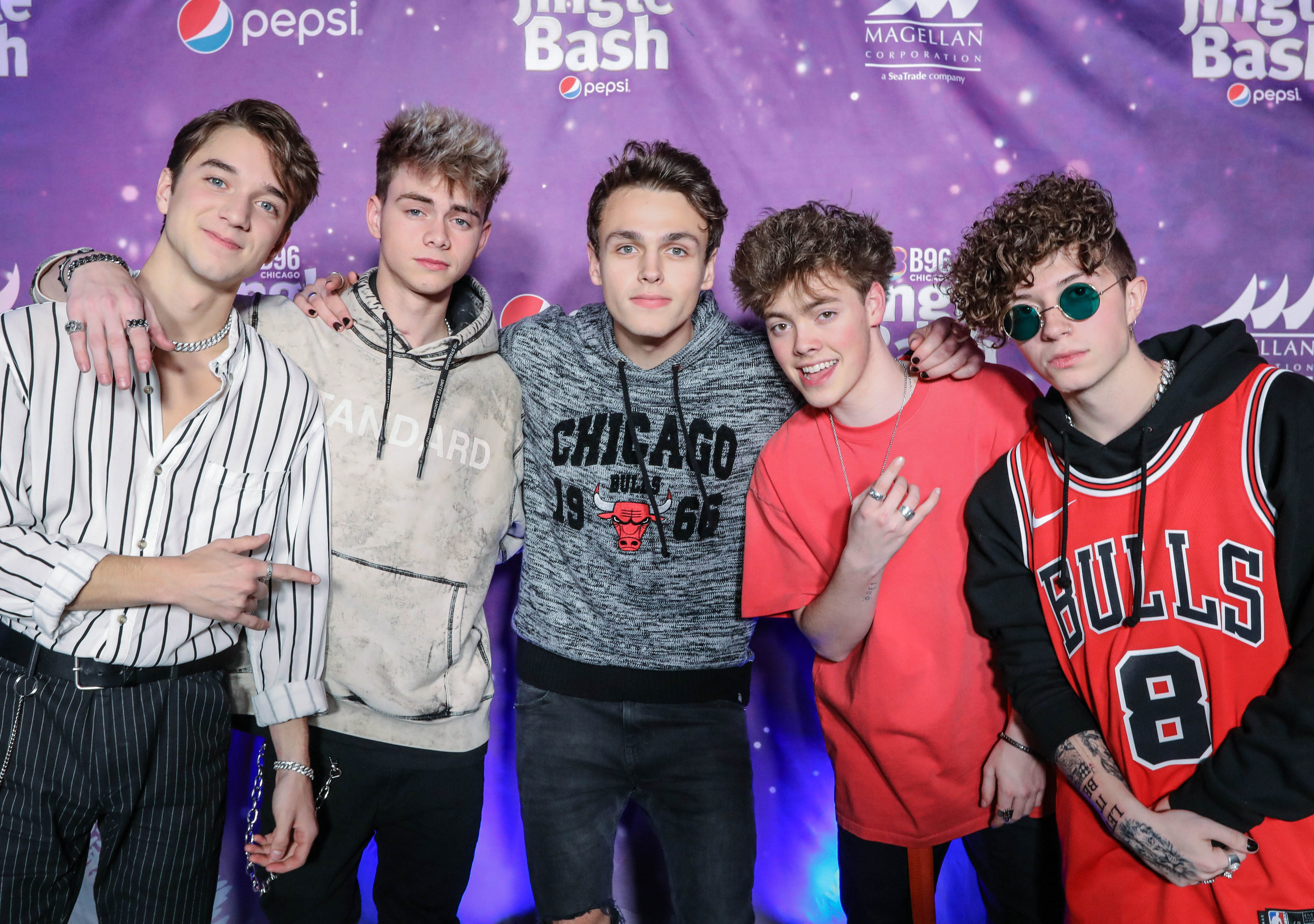
- (From left to right: Seavey, Besson, Marais, Herron, and Avery) Why Don't We at B96 Jingle Bash 2018 in Chicago, Illinois.
- Studio albums: 2
- EPs: 6
- Singles: 26
- Music videos: 30
- Promotional singles: 3

American boy band Why Don't We, which consisted of Zach Herron, Jack Avery, Daniel Seavey, Corbyn Besson, and Jonah Marais, released two studio albums, six extended plays, sixteen music videos, twenty-six singles (including one as featured artist), and three promotional singles.

== Albums ==
List of albums, with selected details and chart positions
Title	Details	Peak chart positions										Sales
Title	Details	US	AUS	BEL (FL)	CAN	IRE	NLD	NOR	NZ	SWI	UK	Sales
8 Letters	Released: August 31, 2018; Label: Atlantic; Formats: CD, digital download	9	10	21	15	12	17	38	—	87	25	US: 37,000; JPN: 1,107
The Good Times and the Bad Ones	Released: January 15, 2021; Label: Atlantic; Formats: CD, digital download, streaming	3	2	18	19	5	16	—	12	10	5	US: 38,000
"—" denotes a recording that did not chart or was not released.

== Extended plays ==
List of extended plays, with selected details, chart positions
Title	Details	Peak chart positions		
Title	Details	US	US Heat.	NZ Heat.
Only the Beginning	Released: November 25, 2016; Label: Signature; Format: Digital download	—	5	—
Something Different	Released: April 21, 2017; Label: Signature; Format: Digital download	—	6	—
Why Don't We Just	Released: June 2, 2017; Label: Signature; Format: Digital download	—	2	—
Invitation	Released: September 26, 2017; Label: Signature; Format: Digital download	113	2	7
A Why Don't We Christmas	Released: November 23, 2017; Label: Signature; Format: Digital download	—	1	—
Spotify Singles	Released: October 24, 2018; Label: Atlantic; Format: Digital download, streaming	—	—	—
"—" denotes releases that did not chart or were not released in that territory.

== Singles ==
=== As lead artist ===
List of singles as lead artist, with selected chart positions, showing year released and album
Title	Year	Peak chart positions									Certifications	Album
Title	Year	US	US Pop	AUS	CAN	MYS	NZ	SGP	SWE	UK	Certifications	Album
"Taking You"	2016	—	—	—	—	—	—	—	—	—		Only the Beginning
"Nobody Gotta Know"	2016	—	—	—	—	—	—	—	—	—		Only the Beginning
"Just to See You Smile"	2016	—	—	—	—	—	—	—	—	—		Only the Beginning
"On My Way"	2016	—	—	—	—	—	—	—	—	—		Only the Beginning
"Perfect"	2016	—	—	—	—	—	—	—	—	—		Only the Beginning
"Free"	2016	—	—	—	—	—	—	—	—	—		Only the Beginning
"You and Me at Christmas"	2016	—	—	—	—	—	—	—	—	—		A Why Don't We Christmas
"Something Different"	2017	— (Note: "Something Different" did not enter the Billboard Hot 100, but peaked at number 22 on the Bubbling Under Hot 100 Singles chart.)	33	—	—	—	—	—	—	—		Something Different
"Tell Me"	2017	—	—	—	—	—	—	—	—	—		Something Different
"Made For"	2017	—	—	—	—	—	—	—	—	—		Something Different
"Why Don't We Just"	2017	—	—	—	—	—	—	—	—	—		Why Don't We Just
"These Girls" (Note: "These Girls" only appears on the Japanese edition of 8 Letters.)	2017	— (Note: "These Girls" did not enter the Billboard Hot 100, but peaked at number four on the Bubbling Under Hot 100 Singles chart.)	—	—	82	—	—	—	—	—		8 Letters
"Trust Fund Baby" (Note: "Trust Fund Baby" appears on the deluxe and Japanese editions of 8 Letters.)	2018	— (Note: "Trust Fund Baby" did not enter the Billboard Hot 100, but peaked at number 20 on the Bubbling Under Hot 100 Singles chart.)	30	—	—	—	—	—	—	—	MC: Gold; RIAA: Gold	8 Letters
"Hooked"	2018	— (Note: "Hooked" did not enter the Billboard Hot 100, but peaked at number 22 on the Bubbling Under Hot 100 Singles chart.)	—	—	—	—	— (Note: "Hooked" did not enter the NZ Top 40 Singles Chart or Hot Singles Chart, but peaked at number eight on the NZ Heatseeker Singles Chart.)	—	—	—	ARIA: Gold; MC: Gold	8 Letters
"Talk"	2018	— (Note: "Talk" did not enter the Billboard Hot 100, but peaked at number 18 on the Bubbling Under Hot 100 Singles chart.)	—	—	—	—	—	—	—	—		8 Letters
"8 Letters"	2018	— (Note: "8 Letters" did not enter the Billboard Hot 100, but peaked at number 14 on the Bubbling Under Hot 100 Singles chart.)	24	—	—	5	—	3	—	—	RIAA: Platinum; MC: Platinum; RMNZ: Gold	8 Letters
"Big Plans"	2019	—	—	—	—	19	—	15	—	—	RIAA: Gold; ARIA: Platinum; MC: Platinum; RMNZ: Gold	Non-album singles
"Cold in LA"	2019	—	—	—	—	—	—	—	—	—		Non-album singles
"I Don't Belong in This Club" (with Macklemore)	2019	—	—	80	—	—	25	—	87	—	RIAA: Gold; RMNZ: Platinum	Non-album singles
"Unbelievable"	2019	—	—	—	—	—	— (Note: "Unbelievable" did not enter the NZ Top 40 Singles Chart, but peaked at number 26 on the NZ Hot Singles Chart.)	—	—	—	MC: Gold; RMNZ: Gold	Non-album singles
"Come to Brazil"	2019	—	—	—	—	—	— (Note: "Come to Brazil" did not enter the NZ Top 40 Singles Chart, but peaked at number 17 on the NZ Hot Singles Chart.)	—	—	—		Non-album singles
"I Still Do"	2019	—	—	— (Note: "I Still Do" did not enter the ARIA Singles Chart, but peaked at number 39 on the ARIA Digital Track Chart.)	—	—	— (Note: "I Still Do" did not enter the NZ Top 40 Singles Chart, but peaked at number 29 on the NZ Hot Singles Chart.)	—	—	—		Non-album singles
"What Am I"	2019	— (Note: "What Am I" did not enter the Billboard Hot 100, but peaked at number 20 on the Bubbling Under Hot 100 Singles chart.)	22	— (Note: "What Am I" did not enter the ARIA Singles Chart, but peaked at number 20 on the ARIA Digital Track Chart.)	—	—	— (Note: "What Am I" did not enter the NZ Top 40 Singles Chart, but peaked at number 14 on the NZ Hot Singles Chart.)	20	—	—	RIAA: Gold; ARIA: Platinum; MC: Platinum; RMNZ: Gold	Non-album singles
"Mad at You"	2019	—	—	—	—	—	— (Note: "Mad at You" did not enter the NZ Top 40 Singles Chart, but peaked at number 40 on the NZ Hot Singles Chart.)	—	—	—		Non-album singles
"With You This Christmas"	2019	—	—	—	—	—	— (Note: "With You This Christmas" did not enter the NZ Top 40 Singles Chart, but peaked at number 16 on the NZ Hot Singles Chart.)	—	—	—		Non-album singles
"Chills"	2019	—	—	—	—	—	— (Note: "Chills" did not enter the NZ Top 40 Singles Chart, but peaked at number 20 on the NZ Hot Singles Chart.)	—	—	—		Non-album singles
"Fallin' (Adrenaline)"	2020	37	22	—	—	—	— (Note: "Fallin' (Adrenaline)" did not enter the NZ Top 40 Singles Chart, but peaked at number 15 on the NZ Hot Singles Chart.)	—	—	—	RIAA: Gold; ARIA: Gold; RMNZ: Platinum	The Good Times and the Bad Ones
"Lotus Inn"	2020	—	—	—	—	—	— (Note: "Lotus Inn" did not enter the NZ Top 40 Singles Chart, but peaked at number 22 on the NZ Hot Singles Chart.)	—	—	—		The Good Times and the Bad Ones
"Slow Down"	2020	—	—	—	—	—	— (Note: "Slow Down" did not enter the NZ Top 40 Singles Chart, but peaked at number 19 on the NZ Hot Singles Chart.)	—	—	—		The Good Times and the Bad Ones
"Love Back"	2021	—	—	—	—	—	— (Note: "Love Back" did not enter the NZ Top 40 Singles Chart, but peaked at number 36 on the NZ Hot Singles Chart.)	—	—	—		Non-album singles
"Mistletoe"	2021	—	—	—	—	—	—	—	—	—		Non-album singles
"Don't Wake Me Up" (with Jonas Blue)	2022	—	—	—	—	—	— (Note: "Don't Wake Me Up" did not enter the NZ Top 40 Singles Chart, but peaked at number 15 on the NZ Hot Singles Chart.)	—	—	79		Together
"Let Me Down Easy (Lie)"	2022	—	—	—	—	—	— (Note: "Let Me Down Easy (Lie)" did not enter the NZ Top 40 Singles Chart, but peaked at number 37 on the NZ Hot Singles Chart.)	—	—	—		Non-album singles
"Just Friends"	2022	—	—	—	—	—	— (Note: "Just Friends" did not enter the NZ Top 40 Singles Chart, but peaked at number 22 on the NZ Hot Singles Chart.)	—	—	—		Non-album singles
"How Do You Love Somebody"	2022	—	—	—	—	—	—	—	—	—		Non-album singles
"—" denotes a recording that did not chart or was not released.

=== As featured artist ===
Title	Year	Peak chart positions		Certifications	Album
Title	Year	US Bub.	AUS	Certifications	Album
"Help Me Help You" (Logan Paul featuring Why Don't We)	2017	5	90	RIAA: Platinum; MC: Gold	Non-album single

=== Promotional singles ===
Title	Year	Album
"The Fall of Jake Paul" (Logan Paul featuring Why Don't We)	2017	Non-album promotional single
"Words I Didn't Say"	2017	Invitation
"Feliz Navidad"	2018	Non-album promotional single
"Don't Change"	2019	UglyDolls

== Other charted songs ==
Title	Year	Peak chart positions	Album
Title	Year	NZ Hot	Album
"Be Myself"	2021	40	The Good Times and the Bad Ones
"Love Song"	2021	36	The Good Times and the Bad Ones
"Grey"	2021	18	The Good Times and the Bad Ones
"Look at Me"	2021	37	The Good Times and the Bad Ones

== Music videos ==
Title	Year	Other artist(s)	Director(s)	Ref
"Taking You"	2016	None	Steven Taylor	
"Nobody Gotta Know"	2017	None	Logan Paul	
"Something Different"	2017	None	Logan Paul	
"Help Me Help You"	2017	Logan Paul	Logan Paul	
"The Fall of Jake Paul"	2017	Logan Paul	Sebastian A. Guerra	
"These Girls"	2017	None	Eli Sokhn & Logan Paul	
"Trust Fund Baby"	2018	None	Jason Koenig	
"Hooked"	2018	None	Eli Sokhn	
"Talk"	2018	None	Eli Sokhn	
"8 Letters"	2018	None	Eli Sokhn	
"Big Plans"	2019	None	Henry Lipatov	
"Cold in LA"	2019	None	David Loeffler & Henry Lipatov	
"I Don't Belong in This Club"	2019	Macklemore	Jason Koenig	
"Don't Change"	2019	None	David Loeffler & Henry Lipatov	
"Unbelievable"	2019	None	David Loeffler & Henry Lipatov	
"What Am I"	2019	None	Andy Hines	
"Chills"	2020	None	Evan Hara	
"Fallin' (Adrenaline)"	2020	None	Isaac Rentz	
"Lotus Inn"	2020	None	Dillon Dowdell	
"Slow Down"	2020	None		
"Love Back"	2021	None	Dillon Dowdell	
"Don't Wake Me Up"	2022	Jonas Blue	Isaac Rentz	
"Let Me Down Easy" (Lie)	2022	None	Antony Muse	
"Just Friends"	2022	None	Antony Muse	
"How Do You Love Somebody"	2022	None	Antony Muse	
