= Eight Letters =

Eight Letters or 8 Letters may refer to:

- 8 Letters, album by Why Don't We
  - "8 Letters", song from the above album
- "Eight Letters", song by Take That from the album Progress
