= 8 Letters (song) =

- Cover for "8 Letters" (Acoustic)

Single by Why Don't We

from the album 8 Letters
- Released: August 19, 2018
- Genre: Pop
- Length: 3:10
- Label: Signature; Atlantic Records
- Songwriters: James Abrahart; Jonny Price; Jordan K. Johnson; Marcus Lomax; Stefan Johnson
- Producer: The Monsters & Strangerz

Why Don't We singles chronology
"Talk" (2018)	"8 Letters" (2018)	"Big Plans" (2019)

Music video
- "8 Letters" on YouTube

"8 Letters" is a song performed by American boy band Why Don't We. The song was released as a digital download on August 19, 2018, by Signature and Atlantic Records as the third single from their eponymous debut studio album 8 Letters. The song peaked at number fourteen on the US Bubbling Under Hot 100 Singles chart. The track samples the drum break from The Detroit Emeralds' song "You're Getting a Little Too Smart"

== Music video ==
A music video to accompany the release of "8 Letters" was first released onto YouTube on August 19, 2018. The video was directed by Éli Sokhn. The video shows the band frozen in time as they reflect on being incapable of opening up their hearts.

== Awards and nominations ==
Year	Ceremony	Award	Result
2019	Teen Choice Awards	Choice Song: Group	Nominated

== Track listing ==
Digital download
No.	Title	Length
1.	"8 Letters" (Acoustic)	3:17

Digital download
No.	Title	Length
1.	"8 Letters" (Nora En Pure Remix)	3:30
2.	"8 Letters" (Party Pupils Remix)	2:51
3.	"8 Letters" (Luca Schreiner Remix)	3:14
4.	"8 Letters" (R3HAB Remix)	2:12

== Personnel ==
Credits adapted from Tidal.

- The Monsters & Strangerz – Producer, programmer, recording
- Jonny Price – Additional Production, writer
- Nejeeb Jones – Assistant Mix Engineer
- James Abrahart – Background Vocals, writer
- Will Quinnell – Mastering Engineer
- Tony Maserati – Mixing Engineer
- R8DIO – Vocal Production
- Corbyn Besson – Vocals
- Daniel Seavey – Vocals
- Jack Avery – Vocals
- Jonah Marais – Vocals
- Zach Herron – Vocals
- Jordan K. Johnson – Writer
- Marcus Lomax – Writer
- Stefan Johnson – Writer

== Charts ==
Chart (2018)	Peak position
Malaysia (RIM)	5
Singapore (RIAS)	3
US Bubbling Under Hot 100 (Billboard)	14
US Pop Airplay (Billboard)	24

== Certifications ==
Region	Certification	Certified units/sales
Canada (Music Canada)	Platinum	80,000^{‡}
New Zealand (RMNZ)	Gold	15,000^{‡}
United States (RIAA)	Platinum	1,000,000^{‡}
^{‡} Sales+streaming figures based on certification alone.

== Release history ==
Region	Date	Format	Label
United States	August 19, 2018	Digital download; streaming	Signature; Atlantic Records
