= 8 Letters Tour =

2019 concert tour by Why Don't We

- Tour by Why Don't We
- Associated album: 8 Letters
- Start date: March 20, 2019
- End date: December 21, 2019
- Legs: 6
- No. of shows: 92

Why Don't We concert chronology
- Invitation Tour (2018); 8 Letters Tour (2019); The Good Times Only Tour (2022)

The 8 Letters Tour was the fourth and final headlining concert tour by American boy band Why Don't We, in support of their first studio album, 8 Letters (2018). The tour began in Phoenix, Arizona at the Comerica Theatre on March 20, 2019, and concluded in Auckland, New Zealand at Spark Arena on November 29, 2019.

== Background and development ==
Following the release of 8 Letters, Why Don't We announced they would embark on their fourth headlining concert tour, following the Taking You Tour, (2017), the Something Different Tour (2017), and the "Invitation Tour" (2018). Dates were first announced for North America in September 2018, with the tour beginning in March and ending in April. In February 2019, the band announced more North American dates, beginning in July and ending in August. In June, dates in Australia and New Zealand were added. Dates for Asia were announced in July.

Eben was announced as the band's opening act for all North American shows as well as the first Asian leg. In June, it was announced he would open on the Oceania leg. Brynn Elliot was an opener for all shows of the first North American leg aside from the Honolulu show. Taylor Grey was announced as an opener for some European shows.

== Setlist ==
This setlist is representative of the show on March 29, 2019, in Sugar Land. It does not represent all the shows from the tour.

1. "Trust Fund Baby"
2. "M.I.A"
3. "Choose"
4. "Hard"
5. "Friends"
6. "In Too Deep"
7. "Nobody Gotta Know"
8. "I Depend on You"
9. "Runner"
10. "Why Don't We Just"
11. "Something Different"
12. "Taste" / "Finesse" / "Lucid Dreams" / "Better Now"
13. "Taking You"
14. "These Girls"
15. "Hooked"
16. "Talk"
17. "8 Letters"
18. "Big Plans"
19. "Cold in LA"
20. "I Don't Belong in This Club"
Notes

Notes

- During the concert in Costa Mesa on July 18, "Come to Brazil" and "Unbelievable" were added to the setlist.
- During the concert in Baltimore on August 5, "I Still Do" was added to the setlist.
- During the concert in Cincinnati on August 25, "What Am I" was added to the setlist.

== Tour dates ==
Date	City	Country	Venue	Opening act
North America
March 20, 2019	Phoenix	United States	Comerica Theatre	EBEN; Brynn Elliot
March 22, 2019	Los Angeles	United States	Microsoft Theatre	EBEN; Brynn Elliot
March 23, 2019	Las Vegas	United States	Pearl Concert Theater	EBEN; Brynn Elliot
March 24, 2019	San Jose	United States	Event Center Arena	EBEN; Brynn Elliot
March 26, 2019	Orem	United States	UCCU Center	EBEN; Brynn Elliot
March 27, 2019	Broomfield	United States	1stBank Center	EBEN; Brynn Elliot
March 29, 2019	Sugar Land	United States	Smart Financial Centre	EBEN; Brynn Elliot
March 30, 2019	Grand Prairie	United States	The Theatre at Grand Prairie	EBEN; Brynn Elliot
April 1, 2019	Orlando	United States	CFE Arena	EBEN; Brynn Elliot
April 2, 2019	Atlanta	United States	Fox Theatre	EBEN; Brynn Elliot
April 4, 2019	Fairfax	United States	EagleBank Arena	EBEN; Brynn Elliot
April 5, 2019	New York City	United States	Radio City Music Hall	EBEN; Brynn Elliot
April 6, 2019	Boston	United States	Agganis Arena	EBEN; Brynn Elliot
April 8, 2019	Laval	Canada	Place Bell	EBEN; Brynn Elliot
April 9, 2019	Toronto	Canada	Coca-Cola Coliseum	EBEN; Brynn Elliot
April 11, 2019	Detroit	United States	Fox Theatre	EBEN; Brynn Elliot
April 12, 2019	Rosemont	United States	Rosemont Theatre	EBEN; Brynn Elliot
April 14, 2019	Saint Paul	United States	Roy Wilkins Auditorium	EBEN; Brynn Elliot
April 17, 2019	Portland	United States	Arlene Schnitzer Concert Hall	EBEN; Brynn Elliot
April 18, 2019	Seattle	United States	WaMu Theater	EBEN; Brynn Elliot
May 18, 2019	Honolulu	United States	The Republik	EBEN
Asia
May 23, 2019	Nagoya	Japan	Zepp Nagoya	EBEN
May 24, 2019	Osaka	Japan	Zepp Bayside	EBEN
May 27, 2019	Tokyo	Japan	Zepp Tokyo	EBEN
May 28, 2019	Tokyo	Japan	Zepp Tokyo	EBEN
North America
June 7, 2019	Saint Paul	United States	Myth Live	EBEN
June 9, 2019	Memphis	United States	Graceland	EBEN
June 14, 2019	Wantagh	United States	Jones Beach Theater	EBEN
June 16, 2019	Mansfield	United States	Xfinity Center	EBEN
June 20, 2019	Buffalo	United States	Canalside	EBEN
June 21, 2019	Indianapolis	United States	Farm Bureau Insurance Lawn	EBEN
June 22, 2019	Rosemont	United States	Allstate Arena	EBEN
June 23, 2019	Milwaukee	United States	The Rave/Eagles Club	EBEN
July 18, 2019	Costa Mesa	United States	Orange County Fair	EBEN
July 19, 2019	San Diego	United States	Cal Coast Credit Union Open Air Theatre	EBEN
July 20, 2019	Las Vegas	United States	Park Theatre	EBEN
July 22, 2019	Paso Robles	United States	California Mid-State Fair	EBEN
July 25, 2019	Kansas City	United States	Starlight Theatre	EBEN
July 26, 2019	Rogers	United States	Walmart Arkansas Music Pavilion	EBEN
July 27, 2019	St. Louis	United States	Fox Theatre	EBEN
July 28, 2019	Nashville	United States	Ascend Amphitheater	EBEN
July 30, 2019	Louisville	United States	The Louisville Palace	EBEN
August 1, 2019	Boca Raton	United States	Mizner Park Amphitheater	EBEN
August 2, 2019	Jacksonville	United States	Daily's Place	EBEN
August 3, 2019	Raleigh	United States	Red Hat Amphitheater	EBEN
August 5, 2019	Baltimore	United States	MECU Pavilion	EBEN
August 6, 2019	Albany	United States	Palace Theatre	EBEN
August 8, 2019	Gilford	United States	Bank of New Hampshire Pavilion	EBEN
August 9, 2019	Uncasville	United States	Mohegan Sun Arena	EBEN
August 10, 2019	Philadelphia	United States	The Met Philadelphia	EBEN
August 11, 2019	Moon	United States	UPMC Events Center	EBEN
August 13, 2019	Springfield	United States	Illinois State Fair	EBEN
August 14, 2019	Lincoln	United States	Pinnacle Bank Arena	EBEN
August 16, 2019	San Antonio	United States	The Kidd Kraddick Morning Show Big Summer Blast	EBEN
August 17, 2019	Tulsa	United States	Back to School Bash	EBEN
August 18, 2019	Park City	United States	Hartman Arena	EBEN
August 20, 2019	Charleston	United States	Family Circle Tennis Center	EBEN
August 21, 2019	Pelham	United States	Oak Mountain Amphitheatre	EBEN
August 23, 2019	Saint Paul	United States	Minnesota State Fair	EBEN
August 25, 2019	Cincinnati	United States	PNC Pavilion at Riverbend	EBEN
August 26, 2019	Grand Rapids	United States	DeVos Performance Hall	EBEN
August 28, 2019	Cleveland	United States	Jacobs Pavilion	EBEN
August 29, 2019	Syracuse	United States	Great New York State Fair	EBEN
August 31, 2019	Allentown	United States	Great Allentown Fair	EBEN
Europe
October 6, 2019	Stockholm	Sweden	Fryshuset	Taylor Grey; EBEN
October 7, 2019	Oslo	Norway	Sentrum Scene	Taylor Grey; EBEN
October 9, 2019	Copenhagen	Denmark	Lille Vega	Taylor Grey; EBEN
October 10, 2019	Hamburg	Germany	Docks	Taylor Grey; EBEN
October 11, 2019	Offenbach	Germany	Stadthalle Offenbach	Taylor Grey; EBEN
October 12, 2019	Dortmund	Germany	Warsteiner Music Hall	Taylor Grey; EBEN
October 14, 2019	Utrecht	Netherlands	TivoliVredenburg	Taylor Grey; EBEN
October 15, 2019	Tilburg	Netherlands	Poppodium Tilburg	Taylor Grey; EBEN
October 16, 2019	Utrecht	Netherlands	TivoliVredenburg	Taylor Grey; EBEN
October 18, 2019	Munich	Germany	Kleine Olympiahalle München	Taylor Grey; EBEN
October 20, 2019	London	England	Eventim Apollo	EBEN; Dennis Coleman
October 21, 2019	Birmingham	England	The Alexandra	EBEN; Dennis Coleman
October 22, 2019	Manchester	England	O2 Apollo Manchester	EBEN; Dennis Coleman
October 23, 2019	Manchester	England	O2 Apollo Manchester	EBEN; Dennis Coleman
October 26, 2019	Birmingham	England	The Alexander	EBEN; Dennis Coleman
October 28, 2019	London	England	Eventim Apollo	EBEN; Dennis Coleman
Asia
November 10, 2019	Seoul	South Korea	YES 24 Live Hall	Halogen Sponsor
November 12, 2019	Beijing	China	Tango	Halogen Sponsor
November 14, 2019	Kuala Lumpur	Malaysia	Plenary Hall, KLCC	Halogen Sponsor
November 16, 2019	Singapore	Singapore	Marina Bay Sands Expo and Convention Center	Halogen Sponsor
November 18, 2019	Quezon City	Philippines	New Frontier Theater	Halogen Sponsor
November 21, 2019	Jakarta	Indonesia	Kota Kasablanka	Halogen Sponsor
Oceania
November 24, 2019	Brisbane	Australia	Fortitude Music Hall	Taylor Grey; EBEN
November 26, 2019	Melbourne	Australia	Margaret Court Arena	Taylor Grey; EBEN
November 28, 2019	Sydney	Australia	Big Top Sydney	Taylor Grey; EBEN
November 29, 2019	Auckland	New Zealand	Spark Arena	Taylor Grey; EBEN
