= Help Me Help You =

Help Me Help You may refer to:

- Jerry Maguire (film), 1996
- Help Me Help You (TV series), 2006
- "Help Me Help You" (song), 2017
- "Help Me Help You", by Coldrain from the album Nonnegative, 2022.
