= What Am I =

2019 song by Why Don't We

Single by Why Don't We
- Released: August 22, 2019
- Recorded: 2019
- Genre: Pop
- Length: 3:04
- Label: Signature; Atlantic Records
- Songwriters: Ammar Malik; Ed Sheeran; Steve Mac
- Producer: Steve Mac

Why Don't We singles chronology
"I Still Do" (2019)	"What Am I" (2019)	"Mad at You" (2019)

"What Am I" is a song performed by American boy band Why Don't We. The song was released as a digital download on August 22, 2019 by Signature and Atlantic Records. The song peaked at number twenty on the US Bubbling Under Hot 100 Singles chart. The song was written by Ammar Malik, Ed Sheeran and Steve Mac, who also produced the song.

== Background ==
The song was co-written by Ed Sheeran, he was also a co-writer on the single "Trust Fund Baby". In August 2019, the band announced the release of the new single of their social media accounts.

== Music video ==
A music video to accompany the release of "What Am I" was first released onto YouTube on August 23, 2019. The video was directed by Andy Hines and shows the band having a celebratory end-of-summer bonfire on the beach.

== Track listing ==
Digital download
No.	Title	Length
1.	"What Am I"	3:04

Digital download
No.	Title	Length
1.	"What Am I" (Live and Unplugged Session)	3:41

Digital download
No.	Title	Length
1.	"What Am I" (Cash Cash Remix)	2:39
2.	"What Am I" (SONDR Remix)	3:00
3.	"What Am I" (Casualkimono Remix)	3:11
4.	"What Am I" (Martin Jensen Remix)	2:33

== Personnel ==
Credits adapted from Tidal.

- Steve Mac – Producer, keyboards, writer
- Chris Laws – Drums, engineer
- Dann Pursey – Engineer
- Duncan Fuller – Engineer
- Mike Horner – Engineer
- Ed Sheeran – Guitar, writer
- Chris Gehringer – Masterer
- Serban Ghenea – Mixer
- John Hanes – Mixing Engineer
- Dave Arch – Strings
- Ammar Malik – Writer
- Corbyn Besson – Vocals
- Daniel Seavey – Vocals
- Jack Avery – Vocals
- Jonah Marais – Vocals
- Zach Herron – Vocals

== Charts ==
Chart (2019)	Peak position
Australia Digital Tracks (ARIA)	20
New Zealand Hot Singles (RMNZ)	14
Singapore (RIAS)	20
US Bubbling Under Hot 100 (Billboard)	20
US Pop Airplay (Billboard)	22

== Certifications ==
Region	Certification	Certified units/sales
Australia (ARIA)	Platinum	70,000^{‡}
Canada (Music Canada)	Platinum	80,000^{‡}
New Zealand (RMNZ)	Gold	15,000^{‡}
United States (RIAA)	Gold	500,000^{‡}
^{‡} Sales+streaming figures based on certification alone.

== Release history ==
Region	Date	Format	Label
United States	August 22, 2019	Digital download; streaming	Signature; Atlantic Records
