= Hooked (Why Don't We song) =

Single by Why Don't We

from the album 8 Letters
- Released: June 7, 2018
- Genre: Pop
- Length: 3:24
- Label: Signature; Atlantic Records
- Songwriter(s): Jacob Manson; Phil Plested
- Producer(s): Jacob Manson

Why Don't We singles chronology
"Trust Fund Baby" (2018)	"Hooked" (2018)	"Talk" (2018)

"Hooked" is a song performed by American boy band Why Don't We. The song was released as a digital download on June 7, 2018 by Signature and Atlantic Records, as the lead single from their debut studio album 8 Letters. The song peaked at number twenty-two on the US Bubbling Under Hot 100 Singles chart.

== Music video ==
A music video to accompany the release of "Hooked" was first released onto YouTube on June 7, 2018. The video was directed by Éli Sokhn. The video depicts the band members in various fantastical dating scenarios (including special agents, video game characters, and giant octopuses).

== Track listing ==
Digital download
No.	Title	Length
1.	"Hooked"	3:24

Digital download
No.	Title	Length
1.	"Hooked" (Borgeous Remix)	3:13

== Personnel ==
Credits adapted from Tidal.

- Jacob Manson – Producer, background vocals, bass, drums, guitar, keyboards, programmer, writer
- Paul Sumpter – Acoustic Guitar
- Phil Plested – Background vocals, writer
- Robin Florent – Engineer
- Scott Desmarais – Engineer
- Chris Galland – Mixing Engineer
- Manny Marroquin – Mixing Engineer
- Louis Bell – Vocal Production
- Corbyn Besson – Vocals
- Daniel Seavey – Vocals
- Jack Avery – Vocals
- Jonah Marais – Vocals
- Zach Herron – Vocals

== Charts ==
Chart (2018)	Peak position
New Zealand Heatseekers (RMNZ)	8
US Bubbling Under Hot 100 Singles (Billboard)	22

== Certifications ==
Region	Certification	Certified units/sales
Australia (ARIA)	Gold	35,000^{‡}
Canada (Music Canada)	Gold	40,000^{‡}
^{‡} Sales+streaming figures based on certification alone.

== Release history ==
Region	Date	Format	Label
United States	June 7, 2018	Digital download; streaming	Signature; Atlantic Records
