= Trust Fund Baby (song) =

Single by Why Don't We

from the album 8 Letters
- Released: February 1, 2018
- Genre: Pop
- Length: 3:04
- Label: Signature; Atlantic
- Songwriters: Ed Sheeran; Fred; Steve Mac
- Producers: Steve Mac; Yates

Why Don't We singles chronology
"These Girls" (2017)	"Trust Fund Baby" (2018)	"Hooked" (2018)

"Trust Fund Baby" is a song by American boy band Why Don't We. The song was released as a digital download on February 1, 2018, by Signature and Atlantic Records, and features on the deluxe edition of their debut studio album 8 Letters. The song peaked at number twenty on the US Bubbling Under Hot 100 Singles chart.

== Background ==
Talking about the song with BuzzFeed, Jack Avery said, "The recording process was fun because it was our first time actually stepping into a big studio after recording from our rooms for our other EPs. We went in and connected with Steve Mac, who was really awesome and humble, got some takes done quickly and now we have this amazing song." Discussing the recording process with co-writer Ed Sheeran, Daniel Seavey said, "Seeing how passionate he still is with all of his success. He could right now be like, 'I'm done' and be good for the rest of his life, but it's not about being good for the rest of his life. It's about the music."

== Music video ==
A music video to accompany the release of "Trust Fund Baby" was first released onto YouTube on March 1, 2018.

== Awards and nominations ==
Year	Ceremony	Award	Result
2018	Teen Choice Awards	Choice Song: Group	Nominated

== Track listing ==
Digital download
No.	Title	Length
1.	"Trust Fund Baby"	3:04

Digital download
No.	Title	Length
1.	"Trust Fund Baby" (Acoustic)	3:09
2.	"Trust Fund Baby" (The White Panda Remix)	3:27

== Personnel ==
Credits adapted from Tidal.

- Steve Mac – Producer, keyboards, writer
- Yates – Producer, keyboards, programmer
- Chris Laws – Additional Drums, engineer
- Ed Sheeran – Background Vocals, writer
- Bill Zimmerman – Engineer
- Dann Pursey – Engineer
- Chris Gehringer – Mastering Engineer
- Phil Tan – Mixing Engineer
- Corbyn Besson – Vocals
- Daniel Seavey – Vocals
- Jack Avery – Vocals
- Jonah Marais – Vocals
- Zach Herron – Vocals
- Fred – Writer

== Charts ==
Chart (2018)	Peak position
US Bubbling Under Hot 100 (Billboard)	20
US Pop Airplay (Billboard)	30

== Certifications ==
Region	Certification	Certified units/sales
Canada (Music Canada)	Gold	40,000^{‡}
United States (RIAA)	Gold	500,000^{‡}
^{‡} Sales+streaming figures based on certification alone.

== Release history ==
Region	Date	Format	Label
United States	February 1, 2018	Digital download; streaming	Signature; Atlantic Records
