= I Don't Belong in This Club =

2019 song by Why Don't We & Macklemore

Single by Why Don't We & Macklemore
- Released: March 20, 2019
- Length: 3:42
- Label: Signature; Atlantic
- Songwriters: Ben Haggerty; Jacob Manson; Max Wolfgang; Zak Abel
- Producer: Jacob Manson

Why Don't We singles chronology
"Cold in LA" (2019)	"I Don't Belong in This Club" (2019)	"Unbelievable" (2019)

Macklemore singles chronology
"These Days" (2018)	"I Don't Belong in This Club" (2019)	"Summer Days" (2019)

"I Don't Belong in This Club" is a song performed by American boy band Why Don't We and American rapper and songwriter Macklemore. The song was released as a digital download on March 20, 2019 by Signature and Atlantic Records. The song was written by Ben Haggerty, Jacob Manson, Max Wolfgang and Zak Abel.

== Music video ==
A music video to accompany the release of "I Don't Belong in This Club" was first released onto YouTube on March 20, 2019. The video was directed by Jason Koenig.

== Track listing ==
Digital download
No.	Title	Length
1.	"I Don't Belong in This Club"	3:42

Digital download
No.	Title	Length
1.	"I Don't Belong in This Club" (Breathe Carolina Remix)	4:22

== Personnel ==
Credits adapted from Tidal.

- Corbyn Besson – vocals
- Daniel Seavey – vocals
- Jack Avery – vocals
- Jonah Marais – vocals
- Ben Haggerty – vocals
- Zach Herron – vocals
- Jacob Manson – bass, drums, keyboard, voice
- Simon Clarke – alto saxophone, baritone saxophone, horn
- Max McElligot – background vocals, bass, guitar, keyboards
- Max Wolfgang – background vocals, bass guitar, guitar, keyboards
- Zak Abel – background vocals, writer
- Jane Oliver – cello
- Rosie Danvers – cello, strings
- Tim Sanders – tenor saxophone
- David Liddell – trombone
- Richard Henry – Trombone
- Ryan Quigley – trumpet
- Emma Owens – viola
- Rebecca Jones – viola
- Alison Dods – violin
- Debbie Widdup – violin
- Gillon Cameron – violin
- Hayley Pomfrett – violin
- Jenny Sacha – violin
- Natalia Bonner – violin
- Patrick Kiernan – violin
- Steve Morris – violin
- Zara Benyounes – violin

== Production ==
- Jacob Manson – producer, engineer
- Adam Lunn – engineer
- Benjamin Rice – engineer, vocal producer
- Nick Taylor – engineer
- Tommy Danvers – engineer, strings
- Chris Gheringer – masterer
- Aaron Mattes – mixer
- Erik Madrid – mixer

== Charts ==
Chart (2019)	Peak position
Australia (ARIA)	80
Canada Digital Songs (Billboard)	36
New Zealand (Recorded Music NZ)	25
Sweden (Sverigetopplistan)	87

== Certifications ==
Region	Certification	Certified units/sales
New Zealand (RMNZ)	Platinum	30,000^{‡}
United States (RIAA)	Gold	500,000^{‡}
^{‡} Sales+streaming figures based on certification alone.

== Release history ==
Region	Date	Format	Label
United States	March 20, 2019	Digital download; streaming	Signature; Atlantic Records
