= Couldn't Be Better =

Song by Kelly Clarkson

from the album UglyDolls: Original Motion Picture Soundtrack
- Genre: Show tune; pop
- Length: 4:16 (Movie version); 3:31 (Pop version)
- Label: Atlantic
- Songwriter(s): Christopher Lennertz; Glenn Slater
- Producer(s): Jesse Shatkin

"Couldn't Be Better" is a song from the 2019 animated musical film UglyDolls, written by Christopher Lennertz and Glenn Slater. The song was performed in its original show-tune "Movie version" in the film by American singer Kelly Clarkson in her vocal role as Moxy, accompanied by select members of the film's cast—Pitbull, Blake Shelton, Wanda Sykes, and Gabriel Iglesias. Lennertz and Slater also wrote a "Pop version" solely recorded by Clarkson that was used in the film's closing credits.

The song, an upbeat number celebrating that life is great and it "couldn't be better", presents the life in the fictional world of Uglyville and one of its citizens, Moxy (played by Clarkson), despite loving her square-peg life in the round-hole town, is curious if there is something beyond the life they usually live. In reception of the song, some critics of the film described it as memorable and well-produced, comparing it to the 2014 film number "Everything Is Awesome" from The Lego Movie, while commercial digital sales of both versions of the song led it to attain a position on the Billboard Kid Digital Songs chart.

== Background and composition ==
Christopher Lennertz was approached by STX Entertainment executive Jason Markey (whom he had previously collaborated with on the 2016 film Bad Moms) to score the film UglyDolls. According to him, the feature film was originally intended to be made as a "fun movie with a single song" by Robert Rodriguez. Asking Glenn Slater to write its lyrics, they co-wrote the song "Couldn't Be Better" as the film's opening number. When Kelly Asbury was hired to replace Rodriguez as the film's director, he remarked of the song, "This song is great; we need to make the whole movie a musical." Upon the selection of the voice actors to cast in the film, Lennertz opted with recording artists. In an interview with Billboard, he remarked, "A lot of times they cast actors who don't sing and then it's really painful. For us, we thought it'd be a great situation if we started with people who had amazing voices." Lennertz first choice to play the lead was Kelly Clarkson, who later sung the most throughout the number.

Lyrically, the song is an upbeat number celebrating that life is great and it "couldn't be better". Derek Smith of Slant Magazine described it as a sugary-sweet pop song about self-acceptance and body positivity. The song was first performed in its show-tune "Movie version" in the film by American singer Kelly Clarkson in her vocal role as Moxy, accompanied by select members of the film's cast—Pitbull, Blake Shelton, Wanda Sykes, and Gabriel Iglesias. In the film, the song introduces the world of Uglyville and its inhabitants, including Moxy (Clarkson), who loves her square-peg life in the round-hole town, but her curiosity about all things leads her to wonder if there is something — anything — on the other side of the mountain that nestles Uglyville. Lennertz and Slater also composed a "Pop version" solely recorded by Clarkson and produced by Jesse Shatkin that was used in the film's closing credits. Inspired by the works of Alan Menken, Lennertz opted to base the entire score of the film from the song.

== Reception ==
Reviewing the film for The Christian Post, editor Leah MarieAnn Klett described the number as "memorable". While The Pop Break's Marisa Carpico wrote that the song was "well-produced (perhaps even over-produced in the way so much music for children can be)". In their review of the film, both Hoai-Tran Bui of /Film and Eric Snider of Crooked Marquee compared it to the 2014 film number "Everything Is Awesome" from The Lego Movie. Following the release of the UglyDolls soundtrack, the combined digital sales of both versions of "Couldn't Be Better" allowed the song to debut on the Billboard Kid Digital Songs chart at number 5 and has spent two weeks on the chart.

== Chart performance ==
Chart (2019)	Peak position
US Kid Digital Songs (Billboard)	5
