= These Girls (song) =

2017 song by Why Don't We

Single by Why Don't We

from the album 8 Letters
- Released: August 30, 2017
- Genre: Pop
- Length: 2:49
- Label: Signature; Atlantic
- Songwriter(s): Davisd Loeffler; John Mitchell; John Monds; Ryan Baharloo; TJ Routon

Why Don't We singles chronology
| "Why Don't We Just" (2017) | "These Girls" (2017) | "Trust Fund Baby" (2018) |

"These Girls" is a song performed by American boy band Why Don't We. The song was released as a digital download on August 30, 2017 by Signature and Atlantic Records. The song was written by Davisd Loeffler, John Mitchell, John Monds, Ryan Baharloo and TJ Routon. The song peaked at number four on the US Bubbling Under Hot 100 Singles chart and number eighty-two on the Canadian Hot 100. It is included on the Japanese edition of the band's debut studio album 8 Letters.

A version of the song remixed by Sagan was released on November 16. An acoustic version of the song was released on December 6.

== Background ==
The song was inspired by the fans Why Don't We met when they toured America during their Something Different Tour. "We’ve been all through the country and were inspired by you", said the band in a post promoting the song.

== Music video ==
A music video to accompany the release of "These Girls" was first released onto YouTube on August 30, 2017. The video was directed by Eli Sokhn and Logan Paul. The video shows the band surrounded by the girls they sing about, and ends with a confetti-showered dance party.

== Awards and nominations ==
| Year | Ceremony | Award | Result |
|---|---|---|---|
| 2018 | Radio Disney Music Awards | Best Song to Lip Sync to | Nominated |

== Track listing ==
Digital download
| No. | Title | Length |
|---|---|---|
| 1. | "These Girls" | 2:49 |

Digital download
| No. | Title | Length |
|---|---|---|
| 1. | "These Girls" (Sagan Remix) | 2:39 |

Digital download
| No. | Title | Length |
|---|---|---|
| 1. | "These Girls" (Acoustic) | 1:44 |

Digital download
| No. | Title | Length |
|---|---|---|
| 1. | "These Girls" | 2:49 |
| 2. | "These Girls" (Acoustic) | 1:44 |
| 3. | "These Girls" (Sagan Remix) | 2:39 |
| Total length: | | 7:12 |

== Personnel ==
Credits adapted from Tidal.

- Corbyn Besson – vocals
- Daniel Seavey – vocals
- Jack Avery – vocals
- Jonah Marais – vocals
- Zach Herron – vocals
- Davisd Loeffler – writer
- John Mitchell – writer
- John Monds – writer
- Ryan Baharloo – writer
- TJ Routon – writer

== Charts ==
Chart performance for "These Girls"
| Chart (2017) | Peak position |
|---|---|
| Canada (Canadian Hot 100) | 82 |
| US Bubbling Under Hot 100 (Billboard) | 4 |

== Release history ==
| Region | Date | Format | Label |
|---|---|---|---|
| Various | August 30, 2017 | Digital download; streaming | Signature; Atlantic Records |
