= Zia Victoria =

American songwriter and musician

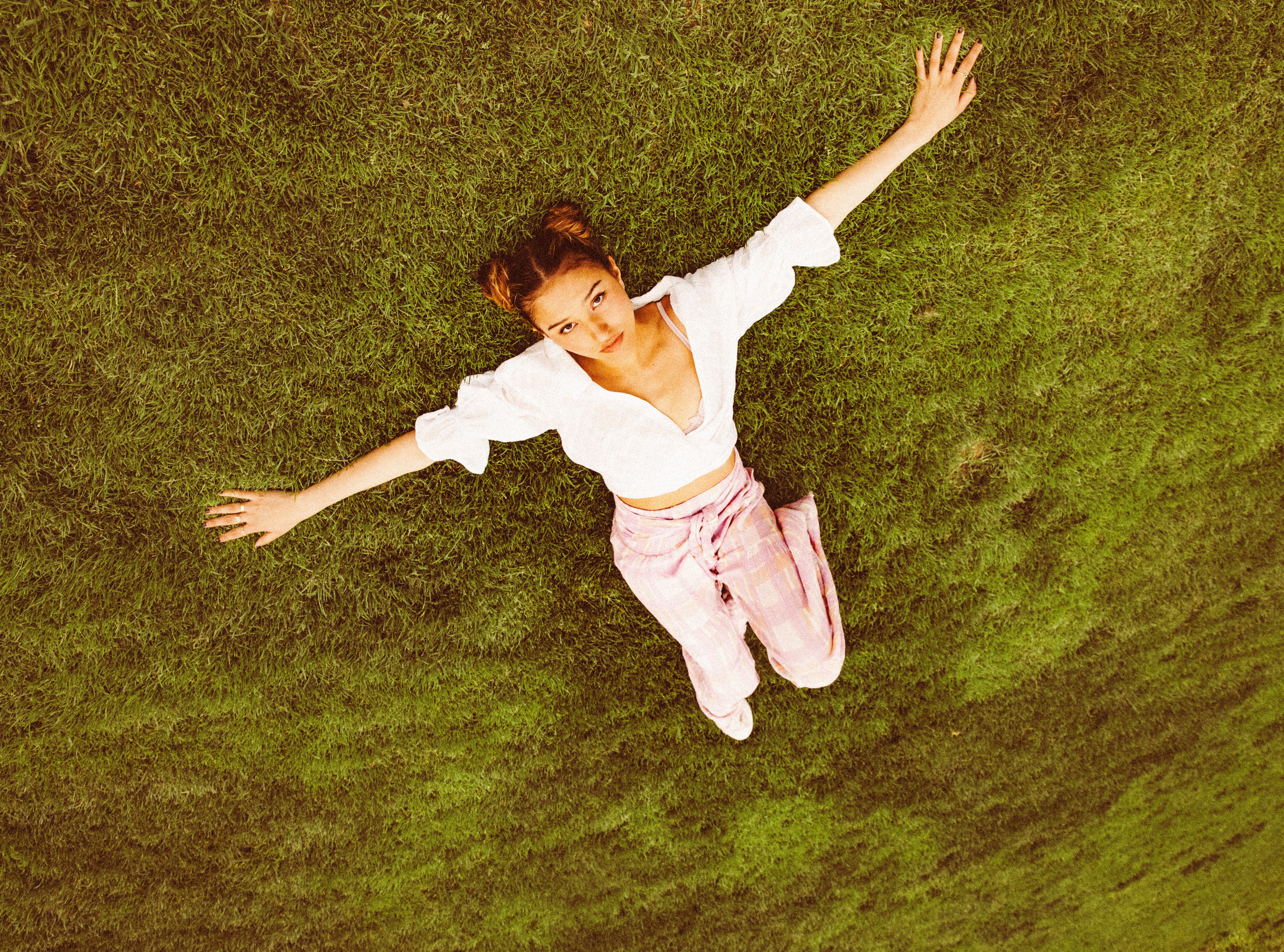
- Zia Victoria, 2021

Background information
- Born: April 18, 2005 (age 21)
- Origin: New York, New York, USA
- Genres: Pop; Folk; rock; alternative
- Occupation: Singer-songwriter
- Instrument: Vocals
- Years active: 2016 – present
- Label: Warner Chappell Music

Zia Victoria Uehling (born 2005) is an American songwriter and musician from New York City. She signed with Warner Chappell Music at the age of 16 and wrote the anthem for Novak Djokovic Foundation at age 11.

== Career ==
Zia Victoria was born on April 18, 2005. At age 11, Zia Victoria performed on The Today Show, where she sang her original song, "Taking Flight." In 2016, she wrote the Novak Djokovic Foundation Anthem, an original song titled, “Do It For Someone Else.”

In 2021, at the age of 16, she signed with Warner Chappell Music.

Zia graduated from the Los Angeles Academy for Artists & Music Production (LAAMP), a collaborative music program for artists, producers, and songwriters, co-founded by the production collective Stargate, known for working with the most influential artists of our time (Beyoncé, Cold Play, Jennifer Hudson, Katy Perry, Ne-Yo, Rihanna, Selena Gomez and more).

While attending LAAMP, she worked on her debut EP, "05 BABY" with Stargate. During these sessions, Zia co-wrote and co-produced 16 songs, including her first single, "Everybody’s Gonna Die!". Her works are featured on Spotify playlists like New Music Friday and Fresh Finds.

In 2022, at age 17, Zia Victoria's cover of Seal’s song "Crazy" caught his attention, and Seal asked Zia to join him on stage for his 2023 summer shows in New York City and Los Angeles. In 2023, at age 18, Zia Victoria joined Seal as the opening act for his fall 2023 Europe tour including performances across the UK and Paris.

== Philanthropy ==
Also, Zia Victoria supports the nonprofit organization Youth Performance Institute (YPI), which provides mentorship and development opportunities for young people from various backgrounds.

In 2023, Zia Victoria released her rendition of one of Joni Mitchell's most acclaimed songs, ‘River,’ with a percentage of sales benefiting Jewel’s #NotAloneChallenge, a social media campaign which reminds people they're not alone and provides free mental health tools.

== Personal life ==
On February 14, 2025, Zia revealed that she was in a relationship with former Why Don't We member and current solo artist Jonah Marais. On January 5, 2026, in a joint Instagram post, the couple announced their engagement.
