= Talk (Why Don't We song) =

Single by Why Don't We

from the album 8 Letters
- Released: July 6, 2018
- Genre: Pop
- Length: 3:10
- Label: Signature; Atlantic Records
- Songwriters: Carl Lehmann; Hayley Gene Penner; Louis Schoorl
- Producer: Louis Schoorl

Why Don't We singles chronology
"Hooked" (2018)	"Talk" (2018)	"8 Letters" (2018)

"Talk" is a song performed by American boy band Why Don't We. The song was released as a digital download on July 6, 2018, by Signature and Atlantic Records as the second single from their debut studio album 8 Letters. The song peaked at number eighteen on the US Bubbling Under Hot 100 Singles chart.

== Music video ==
A music video to accompany the release of "Talk" was first released onto YouTube on July 7, 2018. The video was directed by Éli Sokhn and was filmed across Europe while the band were on the European leg of their Invitation Tour.

== Personnel ==
Credits adapted from Tidal.

- Louis Schoorl – Producer, background vocals, bass, guitar, keyboards, programmer, recorded by, writer
- Celle Lehmann – Background Vocals, guitar
- Why Don't We – Background Vocals
- Chris Gehringer – Mastering Engineer
- Serban Ghenea – Mixing Engineer
- Ariel Chobaz – Recording Engineer
- Corbyn Besson – Vocals
- Daniel Seavey – Vocals
- Jack Avery – Vocals
- Jonah Marais – Vocals
- Zach Herron – Vocals
- Carl Lehmann – Writer
- Hayley Gene Penner – Writer

== Charts ==
Chart (2018)	Peak position
US Bubbling Under Hot 100 (Billboard)	18

== Release history ==
Region	Date	Format	Label
United States	July 6, 2018	Digital download; streaming	Signature; Atlantic Records
