= Big Plans =

Single by Why Don't We
- Released: January 16, 2019
- Recorded: 2018
- Genre: Pop rock
- Length: 2:59
- Label: Signature; Atlantic Records
- Songwriters: Corbyn Besson; Daniel Seavey; Earwulf; Jacob Torrey; James LaVigne; Jonah Marais
- Producer: Earwulf

Why Don't We singles chronology
"8 Letters" (2018)	"Big Plans" (2019)	"Cold in LA" (2019)

Music video
- "Big Plans" on YouTube

"Big Plans" is a song performed by American boy band Why Don't We. The song was released as a digital download on January 16, 2019 by Signature and Atlantic Records. The song was written by Corbyn Besson, Daniel Seavey, Earwulf, Jacob Torrey, James LaVigne and Jonah Marais.

== Music video ==
A music video to accompany the release of "Big Plans" was first released onto YouTube on January 20, 2019. The video was directed by Henry Lipatov.

== Track listing ==
Digital download
No.	Title	Length
1.	"Big Plans"	2:59

== Personnel ==
Credits adapted from Tidal.

- Earwulf – Producer, writer
- Chris Gehringer – Mastering Engineer
- Anders Hvenare – Mixing Engineer
- Andi Inadomi – Production
- Corbyn Besson – Vocals, writer
- Daniel Seavey – Vocals, writer
- Jack Avery – Vocals
- Jonah Marais – Vocals, writer
- Zach Herron – Vocals
- Jacob Torrey – Writer
- James LaVigne – Writer

== Charts ==
Chart (2019)	Peak position
Malaysia (RIM)	19
Singapore (RIAS)	15

== Certifications ==
Region	Certification	Certified units/sales
Australia (ARIA)	Platinum	70,000^{‡}
Canada (Music Canada)	Platinum	80,000^{‡}
New Zealand (RMNZ)	Gold	15,000^{‡}
Singapore (RIAS)	Gold	5,000^{*}
United States (RIAA)	Gold	500,000^{‡}
^{*} Sales figures based on certification alone.^{‡} Sales+streaming figures based on certification alone.

== Release history ==
Region	Date	Format	Label
United States	January 16, 2019	Digital download; streaming	Signature; Atlantic Records
