= Lotus Inn =

2020 single by Why Don't We

Single by Why Don't We

from the album The Good Times and the Bad Ones
- Released: December 12, 2020
- Genre: Pop
- Length: 3:15
- Label: Signature; Atlantic Records
- Songwriters: Daniel Seavey; Jonah Marais
- Producer: Daniel Seavey

Why Don't We singles chronology
"Fallin' (Adrenaline)" (2020)	"Lotus Inn" (2020)	"Slow Down" (2020)

"Lotus Inn" is a song by American boy band Why Don't We. The song was released on December 4, 2020 by Signature and Atlantic Records, as the second single from their second studio album The Good Times and the Bad Ones. A music video to accompany the release of "Lotus Inn" was first released onto YouTube on December 7, 2020.

== Background ==
On December 2, 2020, the band announced the release date of the single across multiple social media platforms.

"'Lotus Inn' is a song we wrote to end our live show with, it has that epic encore feeling. We were inspired by the 'lotus-eaters' in The Odyssey, and a scene from the first Percy Jackson book/movie (The Lightning Thief) where they get stuck in 'The Lotus Hotel and Casino' – indulging in lotus flowers and drinks before they realize a few hours had actually gone on for days. Our lyric 'staying at the Lotus Inn' captures the idea that while partying can be a hell of a time, it can definitely side track you."

— Jonah Marais, Why Don't We release new single, "Lotus Inn", Substream Magazine

== Charts ==
Chart (2020)	Peak position
New Zealand Hot Singles (RMNZ)	22
