= Help Me Help You (song) =

Single by Logan Paul featuring Why Don't We
- Released: May 18, 2017
- Recorded: 2017
- Length: 2:32
- Label: Signature Entertainment
- Songwriter(s): Logan Paul; Daniel Seavey; Zach Herron; Corbyn Besson; Jack Avery; Jonah Marais; Troy "R8DIO" Johnson; Candice Pillay
- Producer(s): Troy "R8DIO" Johnson

Logan Paul singles chronology
"Help Me Help You" (2017)	"The Song of the Summer" (2017)

Why Don't We singles chronology
"Something Different" (2017)	"Help Me Help You" (2017)	"Why Don't We Just" (2017)

Music video
- "Help Me Help You" on YouTube

"Help Me Help You" is a single released by American YouTuber Logan Paul featuring American boy band Why Don't We. It was released on May 18, 2017, alongside a music video on YouTube starring Shay Mitchell.

The song at number 13 on the US Bubbling Under Hot 100 Singles chart, eventually peaking at number five.

== Music video ==
The music video was uploaded on Paul's YouTube account on May 18, 2017.

== Charts ==
Chart (2017)	Peak position
Australia (ARIA)	90
US Bubbling Under Hot 100 (Billboard)	5

== Certifications ==
Region	Certification	Certified units/sales
Canada (Music Canada)	Gold	40,000^{‡}
United States (RIAA)	Platinum	1,000,000^{‡}
^{‡} Sales+streaming figures based on certification alone.

== Release history ==
Region	Date	Format	Label	Ref.
United States	May 18, 2017	Digital download	Signature Entertainment	
