= Teen Choice Award for Choice Music – Single =

Music award

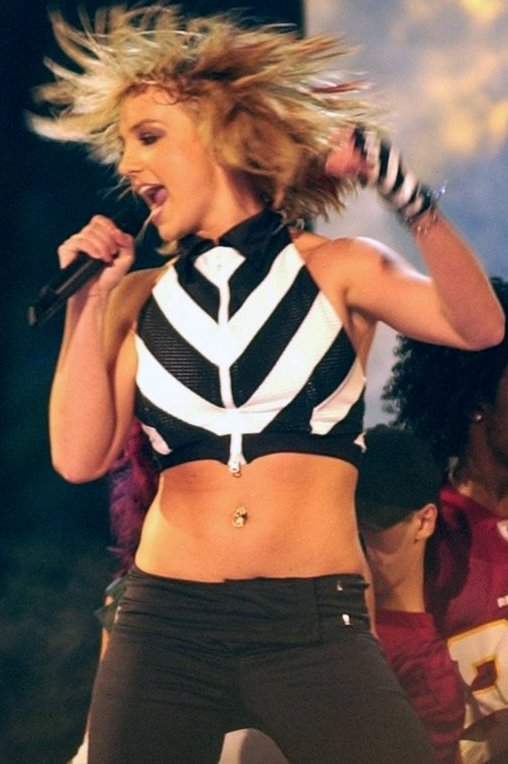
Britney Spears has won this award two times from seven nominations.

The following is a list of Teen Choice Award winners and nominees for Choice Music – Single. This category was split into three categories; Choice Music Single – Male, Choice Music Single – Female and Choice Music Single – Group from 2012 and onward. Britney Spears is the youngest winner in 1999 at the age of 17.

== Winners and nominees ==
=== 1999 ===
Year	Winner	Nominees	Ref.
1999	"...Baby One More Time" – Britney Spears	"Doo Wop (That Thing)" – Lauryn Hill; "Genie in a Bottle" – Christina Aguilera; "I Don't Want to Miss a Thing" – Aerosmith; "I Want It That Way" – Backstreet Boys; "Livin' la Vida Loca" – Ricky Martin; "Man! I Feel Like a Woman!" – Shania Twain; "Wild Wild West" – Will Smith	

=== 2000s ===
Year	Winner	Nominees	Ref.
2000	"Bye Bye Bye" – *NSYNC	"All The Small Things" – Blink 182; "Cowboy" – Kid Rock; "Oops!... I Did It Again" – Britney Spears; "Say My Name" – Destiny's Child; "Show Me the Meaning of Being Lonely" – Backstreet Boys; "Someday" – Sugar Ray; "What a Girl Wants" – Christina Aguilera	
2001	"Pop" – *NSYNC	"All for You" – Janet Jackson; "Angel" – Shaggy featuring Rayvon; "Butterfly" – Crazy Town; "The Call" – Backstreet Boys; "Love Don't Cost a Thing" – Jennifer Lopez; "Stronger" – Britney Spears; "Survivor" – Destiny's Child	
2002	"Girlfriend" – *NSYNC featuring Nelly	"Ain't It Funny" – Jennifer Lopez featuring Ja Rule; "Fallin'" – Alicia Keys; "Hey Baby" – No Doubt; "Get the Party Started" – Pink; "I'm a Slave 4 U" – Britney Spears; "U Don't Have to Call" – Usher; "Whenever, Wherever" – Shakira	
2003	"Sk8er Boi" – Avril Lavigne	"All I Have" – Jennifer Lopez feat LL Cool J; "Beautiful" – Christina Aguilera; "Bump, Bump, Bump" – B2K featuring P. Diddy; "Cry Me a River" – Justin Timberlake; "In da Club" – 50 Cent; "Underneath It All" – No Doubt featuring Lady Saw; "Work It" – Missy Elliott	
2004	"Toxic" – Britney Spears	"Baby Boy" – Beyoncé featuring Sean Paul; "Hey Ya! – OutKast; "I Don't Wanna Know – Mario Winans featuring Enya and P. Diddy; "Milkshake" – Kelis; "My Immortal" – Evanescence; "This Love" – Maroon 5; "Yeah!" – Usher featuring Lil Jon and Ludacris	
2005	"Since U Been Gone" – Kelly Clarkson	"Beautiful Soul" – Jesse McCartney; "Boulevard of Broken Dreams" – Green Day; "Candy Shop" – 50 Cent; "Drop It Like It's Hot" – Snoop Dogg featuring Pharrell; "Hollaback Girl" – Gwen Stefani; "Lonely No More" – Rob Thomas; "She Will Be Loved" – Maroon 5	
2006	"Dance, Dance" – Fall Out Boy	"Hips Don't Lie" – Shakira featuring Wyclef Jean; "SOS" – Rihanna; "Temperature" – Sean Paul; "Walk Away" – Kelly Clarkson; "You're Beautiful" – James Blunt	
2007	"Girlfriend" – Avril Lavigne	"Cupid's Chokehold" – Gym Class Heroes featuring Patrick Stump; "Give it to Me" – Timbaland featuring Nelly Furtado and Justin Timberlake; "The Sweet Escape" – Gwen Stefani featuring Akon; "Umbrella" – Rihanna featuring Jay-Z	
2008	"When You Look Me in the Eyes" – Jonas Brothers	"4 Minutes" – Madonna featuring Justin Timberlake; "Don't Stop the Music" – Rihanna; "See You Again" – Miley Cyrus; "With You" – Chris Brown	
2009	"The Climb" – Miley Cyrus	"Circus" – Britney Spears; "Hot n Cold" – Katy Perry; "My Life Would Suck Without You" – Kelly Clarkson; "Poker Face" – Lady Gaga	

=== 2010s ===
Year	Winner	Nominees	Ref.
2010	"California Gurls" – Katy Perry	"Bad Romance" – Lady Gaga; "Can't Be Tamed" – Miley Cyrus; "Nothin' on You" – B.o.B. featuring Bruno Mars; "Your Love Is My Drug" – Ke$ha	
2011	"Who Says" – Selena Gomez & the Scene	"Born This Way" – Lady Gaga; "Firework" – Katy Perry; "Give Me Everything" – Pitbull featuring Afrojack, Ne-Yo and Nayer; "The Time (Dirty Bit)" – The Black Eyed Peas	
2012	Choice Music Single – Male		
2012	"Boyfriend" – Justin Bieber	"Give Me Everything" – Pitbull featuring Ne-Yo, Afrojack and Nayer; "Good Feeling" – Flo Rida; "It Will Rain" – Bruno Mars; "Take Care" – Drake featuring Rihanna	
2012	Choice Music Single – Female		
2012	"Eyes Open" – Taylor Swift	"Dance Again" – Jennifer Lopez featuring Pitbull; "Part of Me" – Katy Perry; "Set Fire to the Rain" – Adele; "Stronger (What Doesn't Kill You)" – Kelly Clarkson	
2012	Choice Music Single – Group		
2012	"We Are Young" – Fun. featuring Janelle Monáe	"Ass Back Home" – Gym Class Heroes featuring Neon Hitch; "Hit the Lights" – Selena Gomez & the Scene; "Moves Like Jagger" – Maroon 5 featuring Christina Aguilera; "Party Rock Anthem" – LMFAO featuring Lauren Bennett and GoonRock	
2013	Choice Music Single – Male		
2013	"Beauty and a Beat" – Justin Bieber featuring Nicki Minaj	"Blurred Lines" – Robin Thicke featuring Pharrell and T.I.; "Feel This Moment" – Pitbull featuring Christina Aguilera; "Locked Out of Heaven" – Bruno Mars; "Suit & Tie" – Justin Timberlake featuring Jay Z	
2013	Choice Music Single – Female		
2013	"Heart Attack" – Demi Lovato	"Come & Get It" – Selena Gomez; "Cups (Pitch Perfect's 'When I'm Gone')" – Anna Kendrick; "I Knew You Were Trouble" – Taylor Swift; "We Can't Stop" – Miley Cyrus	
2013	Choice Music Single – Group		
2013	"Live While We're Young" – One Direction	"Get Lucky" – Daft Punk featuring Pharrell Williams; "I Love It" – Icona Pop featuring Charli XCX; "Love Somebody" – Maroon 5; "Thrift Shop" – Macklemore & Ryan Lewis featuring Wanz	
2014	Choice Music Single – Male		
2014	"Sing" – Ed Sheeran	"Happy" – Pharrell Williams; "Mmm Yeah" – Austin Mahone featuring Pitbull; "Stay with Me" – Sam Smith; "Talk Dirty" – Jason Derulo featuring 2 Chainz	
2014	Choice Music Single – Female		
2014	"Problem" – Ariana Grande featuring Iggy Azalea	"Dark Horse" – Katy Perry featuring Juicy J; "Fancy" – Iggy Azalea featuring Charli XCX; "Let It Go" – Idina Menzel; "Team" – Lorde	
2014	Choice Music Single – Group		
2014	"Story of My Life" – One Direction	"Boss" – Fifth Harmony; "Me and My Broken Heart" – Rixton; "Rude" – Magic!; "She Looks So Perfect" – 5 Seconds of Summer	
2015	Choice Music Single – Male		
2015	"Thinking Out Loud" – Ed Sheeran	"Jealous" – Nick Jonas; "Lay Me Down" – Sam Smith; "Stitches" – Shawn Mendes; "Uptown Funk" – Mark Ronson featuring Bruno Mars; "Where Are Ü Now – Jack Ü and Justin Bieber	
2015	Choice Music Single – Female		
2015	"One Last Time" – Ariana Grande	"All About That Bass" – Meghan Trainor; "Bang Bang" – Jessie J, Ariana Grande and Nicki Minaj; "Heartbeat Song" – Kelly Clarkson; "Pretty Girls" – Britney Spears and Iggy Azalea; "Shake It Off" – Taylor Swift	
2015	Choice Music Single – Group		
2015	"Steal My Girl" – One Direction	"Centuries" – Fall Out Boy; "Cool Kids" – Echosmith; "Sugar" – Maroon 5; "What I Like About You" – 5 Seconds of Summer; "Worth It" – Fifth Harmony featuring Kid Ink	
2016	Choice Music Single – Male		
2016	"Sorry" – Justin Bieber	"Close" – Nick Jonas featuring Tove Lo; "My House" – Flo Rida; "One Call Away" – Charlie Puth; "Pillowtalk" – Zayn Malik; "Youth" – Troye Sivan	
2016	Choice Music Single – Female		
2016	"Dangerous Woman" – Ariana Grande	"Confident" – Demi Lovato; "Hands to Myself" – Selena Gomez; "Hello" – Adele; "New Romantics" – Taylor Swift; "No" – Meghan Trainor	
2016	Choice Music Single – Group		
2016	"Home" – One Direction	"Cake by the Ocean" – DNCE; "She's Kinda Hot" – 5 Seconds of Summer; "Stressed Out" – Twenty One Pilots; "Wake Up" – The Vamps; "Work from Home" – Fifth Harmony featuring Ty Dolla $ign	
2017	Choice Song: Male Artist		
2017	"Slow Hands" – Niall Horan	"That's What I Like" – Bruno Mars; "Shape of You" – Ed Sheeran; "Sign of the Times" – Harry Styles; "Despacito" – Luis Fonsi & Daddy Yankee featuring Justin Bieber; "Body Like a Back Road" – Sam Hunt	
2017	Choice Song: Female Artist		
2017	"Crying in the Club" – Camila Cabello	"Scars to Your Beautiful" – Alessia Cara; "Most Girls" – Hailee Steinfeld; "Issues" – Julia Michaels; "Malibu" – Miley Cyrus; "Bad Liar" – Selena Gomez	
2017	Choice Song: Group		
2017	"Down" – Fifth Harmony featuring Gucci Mane	"Closer" – The Chainsmokers featuring Halsey; "Guys My Age" – Hey Violet; "Believer" – Imagine Dragons; "Shout Out to My Ex" – Little Mix; "Heathens" – Twenty One Pilots	
2018	Choice Song: Male Artist		
2018	"Perfect" – Ed Sheeran	"Attention – Charlie Puth; "This Is America" – Childish Gambino; "God's Plan" – Drake; "Say Something" – Justin Timberlake featuring Chris Stapleton; "LOVE." – Kendrick Lamar featuring Zacari	
2018	Choice Song: Female Artist		
2018	"Havana" – Camila Cabello featuring Young Thug	"No Tears Left to Cry" – Ariana Grande; "Sorry Not Sorry" – Demi Lovato; "New Rules" – Dua Lipa; "Bad at Love" – Halsey; "Look What You Made Me Do" – Taylor Swift	
2018	Choice Song: Group		
2018	"Youngblood" – 5 Seconds of Summer	"Whatever It Takes" – Imagine Dragons; "Wait" – Maroon 5; "Say Amen (Saturday Night)" – Panic! at the Disco; "Feel It Still" – Portugal. The Man; "Trust Fund Baby" – Why Don't We	
2019	Choice Song: Male Artist		
2019	"Two of Us" – Louis Tomlinson	"Better" – Khalid; "If I Can't Have You" – Shawn Mendes; "Old Town Road" – Lil Nas X; "SICKO MODE" – Travis Scott; "Wow." – Post Malone	
2019	Choice Song: Female Artist		
2019	"Expectations" – Lauren Jauregui	"7 Rings" — Ariana Grande; "Bad Guy" – Billie Eilish; "Me!" — Taylor Swift feat. Brendon Urie; "Never Really Over" – Katy Perry; "Nightmare" – Halsey	
2019	Choice Song: Group		
2019	"Ddu-Du Ddu-Du" – Blackpink	"Bad Liar" – Imagine Dragons; "Easier" – 5 Seconds of Summer; "Hey Look Ma, I Made It" – Panic! at the Disco; "Sucker" – Jonas Brothers; "8 Letters" – Why Don't We	
