= The Good Times and the Bad Ones =

Studio album by Why Don't We
- Released: January 15, 2021
- Recorded: 2020
- Genre: Pop rock
- Length: 32:12
- Label: Signature Entertainment; Atlantic
- Producer: Daniel Seavey; Jaycen Joshua; Travis Barker

Why Don't We chronology
Spotify Singles (2018)	The Good Times and the Bad Ones (2021)

Why Don't We studio album chronology
8 Letters (2018)	The Good Times and the Bad Ones (2021)

Singles from The Good Times and the Bad Ones
- 1. "Fallin' (Adrenaline)" Released: September 29, 2020; 2. "Lotus Inn" Released: December 4, 2020; 3. "Slow Down" Released: December 18, 2020

The Good Times and the Bad Ones is the second and final studio album by American boy band Why Don't We. The album was released on January 15, 2021, by Signature Entertainment & Atlantic Records. The album was supported by three singles: "Fallin' (Adrenaline)", "Lotus Inn" and "Slow Down". The album debuted at number 3 on the Billboard 200, making it the band's most successful album on the chart.

== Singles ==
"Fallin' (Adrenaline)" was released as the lead single from the album on September 29, 2020. The song peaked at number thirty-seven on the US Billboard Hot 100 chart. "Lotus Inn" was released as the second single from the album on December 4, 2020. "Slow Down" was released as the third single from the album on December 18, 2020, it also contains an interpolation from the guitar riff of 1979 By The Smashing Pumpkins.

== Critical reception ==
Sara London of RIFF Magazine gave the album a mixed review, writing that "they've got a long way to go to cultivate a voice of their own" and that "it seems more like they're siphoning the aura of others rather than creating their own" while also adding that "there are five singers and it's difficult to tell one from the other." She ended her review by saying "even though most of the album is hot off the production line at the teenybopper pop factory, there are glints of originality in songs like "For You" and that "for the casual bubblegum pop listener, it'll suffice for a passably amusing album." Writing for Atwood Magazine, Nasya Blackshear felt that the while the album "didn't reinvent the world of pop, it did reinvent Why Don't We" and that "the album is light-hearted and an easy listen making a solid transition from tween to teen/young adult music," although she did feel that "the tracklist order feels a bit up and down."

Matt Collar of AllMusic opined that the album "could use a few more uptempo songs to keep things from sounding samey" but felt that it speaks to the band's "deepening pop maturity."

== Commercial performance ==
The album debuted at number three on the Billboard 200 with 46,000 equivalent album units earned. Of that sum, 38,000 comprise album sales (making it the top-selling album of the week), 7,500 comprise SEA units (equating to 11.34 million on-demand streams of the album's songs) and a little under 500 comprise TEA units.

== Track listing ==
The Good Times and the Bad Ones – Standard edition
No.	Title	Writer(s)	Producer(s)	Length
1.	"Fallin' (Adrenaline)"	Guy-Manuel de Homem-Christo; Corbyn Besson; Cydel Young; Daniel Seavey; Derrick Watkins; Elon Rutberg; Jonah Marais; Kanye West; Malik Jones; Michael Dean; Noah Goldstein; Sakiya Sandifer; Thomas Bangalter; Wasalu Jaco	Daniel Seavey; Jaycen Joshua	3:36
2.	"Slow Down"	Billy Corgan; Besson; Seavey; Marais	Seavey; Joshua	3:08
3.	"Lotus Inn"	Seavey; Marais	Seavey; Joshua	3:15
4.	"Be Myself"	Seavey	Seavey; Joshua	3:33
5.	"Love Song"	Seavey	Seavey; Joshua	2:31
6.	"Grey"	Seavey; Marais	Seavey; Joshua	4:37
7.	"For You"	Besson; Seavey; Marais	Skrillex	3:22
8.	"I'll Be Okay"	Seavey; Marais		3:22
9.	"Look at Me"	Besson; Seavey; Avery; Marais		1:57
10.	"Stay"	Seavey; Marais	Timbaland	2:47
Total length:				32:12

Japanese edition bonus tracks
No.	Title	Writer(s)	Producer(s)	Length
11.	"Fallin' (Adrenaline)" (Goldhouse remix)	Guy-Manuel de Homem-Christo; Besson; Young; Seavey; Watkins; Rutberg; Marais; Kanye West; Jones; Dean; Goldstein; Sandifer; Bangalter; Jaco	Seavey; Joshua	3:46
12.	"Fallin' (Adrenaline)" (live)	Guy-Manuel de Homem-Christo; Besson; Young; Seavey; Watkins; Rutberg; Marais; Kanye West; Jones; Dean; Goldstein; Sandifer; Bangalter; Jaco	Seavey; Joshua	3:38
13.	"Fallin' (Adrenaline)" (acoustic)	Guy-Manuel de Homem-Christo; Besson; Young; Seavey; Watkins; Rutberg; Marais; Kanye West; Jones; Dean; Goldstein; Sandifer; Bangalter; Jaco	Seavey; Joshua	3:36
Total length:				43:12

== Charts ==
Chart performance for The Good Times and the Bad Ones
Chart (2021)	Peak position
Australian Albums (ARIA)	2
Austrian Albums (Ö3 Austria)	6
Belgian Albums (Ultratop Flanders)	18
Canadian Albums (Billboard)	19
Dutch Albums (Album Top 100)	16
German Albums (Offizielle Top 100)	17
Irish Albums (OCC)	5
Lithuanian Albums (AGATA)	36
New Zealand Albums (RMNZ)	12
Portuguese Albums (AFP)	49
Spanish Albums (Promusicae)	88
Swiss Albums (Schweizer Hitparade)	10
UK Albums (OCC)	5
US Billboard 200	3

== Release history ==
Release history for The Good Times and the Bad Ones
Region	Date	Format	Label	Ref.
United States	January 15, 2021	Digital download; streaming; CD; cassette; vinyl	Atlantic	
