= Something Different (Why Don't We song) =

- "Something Different" (Remixes) cover

Single by Why Don't We

from the EP Something Different
- Released: April 21, 2017
- Genre: Pop
- Length: 2:41
- Label: Signature; Atlantic
- Songwriters: Troy "R8DIO" Johnson; Candice Pillay

Why Don't We singles chronology
"You and Me at Christmas" (2016)	"Something Different" (2017)	"Help Me Help You" (2017)

Music video
- "Something Different" on YouTube

"Something Different" is a single by American boy band Why Don't We. It was released on April 21, 2017, and is the lead single from their second EP of the same name.

The song peaked at number 22 on the US Bubbling Under Hot 100 Singles chart.

In 2018, the song was ranked seventieth by Billboard in their compilation of the 100 Greatest Boyband Songs of All Time.

== Music video ==
The music video was uploaded on YouTube on April 27, 2017. It was directed by Logan Paul and has over 50 million views.

== Remixes ==
On September 8, 2017, remixes of the song by producers Boehm, Feenixpawl, and B-Sights were released digitally.

=== Track listing ===
Digital download
No.	Title	Length
1.	"Something Different" (Boehm Remix)	3:18
2.	"Something Different" (Feenixpawl Remix)	3:20
3.	"Something Different" (B-Sights Remix)	4:27
Total length:		11:05

== Charts ==
Chart (2017)	Peak position
US Bubbling Under Hot 100 (Billboard)	22
US Pop Airplay (Billboard)	33

== Release history ==
Region	Date	Format	Label	Ref.
United States	April 21, 2017	Digital download	Signature Entertainment	
United States	August 8, 2017	Contemporary hit radio	Atlantic	
