= Fallin' (Adrenaline) =

2020 single by Why Don't We

Single by Why Don't We

from the album The Good Times and the Bad Ones
- Released: September 29, 2020
- Recorded: 2020
- Genre: Pop rock
- Length: 3:36
- Label: Atlantic
- Songwriters: Guy-Manuel de Homem-Christo; Corbyn Besson; Cydel Young; Daniel Seavey; Derrick Watkins; Elon Rutberg; Jonah Marais; Kanye West; Malik Jones; Michael Dean; Noah Goldstein; Sakiya Sandifer; Thomas Bangalter; Wasalu Jaco
- Producers: Daniel Seavey; Jaycen Joshua

Why Don't We singles chronology
"Chills" (2019)	"Fallin' (Adrenaline)" (2020)	"Lotus Inn" (2020)

Music video
- "Fallin' (Adrenaline)" on YouTube

"Fallin' (Adrenaline)", originally titled "Fallin'", is a song by American boy band Why Don't We. It was released on September 29, 2020, as the lead single from their second studio album The Good Times and the Bad Ones. It was the first song that the band released after their eight-month hiatus that began in early 2020. The song debuted and peaked at number 37 on the US Billboard Hot 100 chart, becoming the band's first and highest entry. The song samples "Black Skinhead" by Kanye West, from his 2013 album, Yeezus.

Aside from the original song, various versions and remixes were later released. A live version, an acoustic version, and remixes by DJs Goldhouse, Vion Konger, James Hype, and Taska Black were released. South Korean boy group AB6IX released a remix of "Fallin' (Adrenaline)" on January 7, 2021.

== Music video ==
The music video was uploaded on September 29, 2020. The visual depicts all five members performing on a drenched stage, sifting through rushing water. The video is reminiscent of action films, with the members singing from a cell tower that is soon to be struck by godzilla, or atop a jacked up car in a junkyard or even floating mid-air. Lastly, the group joins in one of the closing scenes, emulating the 1974 album cover of Queen's Queen II — with band member Avery's arms crossed across his chest, surrounded by his bandmates.

== Track listing ==
Digital download
No.	Title	Length
1.	"Fallin’ (Adrenaline)"	3:36

Digital download
No.	Title	Length
1.	"Fallin’ (Adrenaline)" (GOLDHOUSE Remix)	3:45

Digital download
No.	Title	Length
1.	"Fallin’ (Adrenaline)" (Live)	3:37

Digital download
No.	Title	Length
1.	"Fallin’ (Adrenaline)" (Vion Konger Remix)	3:24

Digital download
No.	Title	Length
1.	"Fallin’ (Adrenaline)" (James Hype Remix)	4:09

Digital download
No.	Title	Length
1.	"Fallin’ (Adrenaline)" (Acoustic)	3:36

Digital download
No.	Title	Length
1.	"Fallin’ (Adrenaline)" (Taska Black Remix)	3:36

Digital download
No.	Title	Length
1.	"Fallin’ (Adrenaline)" (AB6IX Remix)	3:36

== Chart performance ==
"Fallin'" debuted at number 37 on the Billboard Hot 100 on the chart dated October 17, 2020, becoming their first ever entry on the chart.

== Personnel ==
Credits adapted from Tidal.

- Daniel Seavey – Producer, drum programmer, guitar, keyboards, recording engineer, synthesizer, writer, vocalist
- Corbyn Besson – Writer, guitar, vocalist, additional synthesizer
- Jonah Marais – Writer, piano, vocalist, additional synthesizer
- Zach Herron – Writer, guitar, vocalist, additional synthesizer
- Jack Avery – Writer, guitar, vocalist, additional synthesizer
- Jaycen Joshua – Producer, additional keyboards, additional synthesizer, drum programmer, masterer, mixer
- Mike Seaberg – Additional Drum Programmer, additional keyboards, additional synthesizer, mixing engineer, recording engineer
- Brent Pashke – Additional Guitar
- Damon Riggins Jr. – Assistant Mix Engineer
- Jacob Richards – Assistant Mix Engineer
- David Loeffler – Executive Producer
- Jelli Dorman – Recording Engineer
- Kuk Harrell – Recording Engineer, vocal production
- Guy-Manuel de Homem-Christo – Writer
- Cydel Young – Writer
- Derrick Watkins – Writer
- Elon Rutberg – Writer
- Malik Jones – Writer
- Michael Dean – Writer
- Noah Goldstein – Writer
- Sakiya Sandifer – Writer

== Charts ==
=== Weekly charts ===
Weekly chart performance for "Fallin' (Adrenaline)"
Chart (2020–2022)	Peak position
Hungary (Rádiós Top 40)	10
Hungary (Single Top 40)	25
Latvia (EHR Top 40)	9
New Zealand Hot Singles (RMNZ)	15
Scottish Singles Sales (Official Charts)	4
US Billboard Hot 100	37
US Adult Pop Airplay (Billboard)	31
US Pop Airplay (Billboard)	22

=== Year-end charts ===
2021 year-end chart performance for "Fallin' (Adrenaline)"
Chart (2021)	Position
Hungary (Rádiós Top 40)	49

2022 year-end chart performance for "Fallin' (Adrenaline)"
Chart (2022)	Position
Hungary (Rádiós Top 40)	22

2025 year-end chart performance for "Fallin' (Adrenaline)"
Chart (2025)	Position
Hungary (Rádiós Top 40)	92

== Certifications ==
Region	Certification	Certified units/sales
Australia (ARIA)	Gold	35,000^{‡}
New Zealand (RMNZ)	Platinum	30,000^{‡}
United States (RIAA)	Gold	500,000^{‡}
^{‡} Sales+streaming figures based on certification alone.
