= UglyDolls (soundtrack) =

UglyDolls: Original Motion Picture Soundtrack

Soundtrack album by Various artists
- Released: April 26, 2019
- Recorded: 2018
- Studio: STX Films
- Genre: Pop; electropop
- Length: 46:23
- Label: Atlantic
- Producer: Ben Bram; Steven Haigler; Jerry Harrison; Mayer Hawthorne; Scott Hendricks; Jonas Jeberg; Scott Johnson; Jussifer; Christopher Lennertz; Steve Mac; Mag; Marshmello; The Monsters & Strangerz; Davy Nathan; Gil Norton; PTX; Philsmeeze; Schrool; Jesse Shatkin; Stint; Juliana Hatfield; The Crystal Method

Singles from UglyDolls: Original Motion Picture Soundtrack
- 1. "Broken & Beautiful" Released: March 27, 2019

UglyDolls: Original Motion Picture Soundtrack is the soundtrack album to the 2019 STX Entertainment film UglyDolls, released on April 26, 2019, by Atlantic Records. The soundtrack features Kelly Clarkson, Nick Jonas, Janelle Monáe, Bebe Rexha, Blake Shelton, Pentatonix, Anitta, and Why Don't We. Clarkson's track "Broken & Beautiful" was released prior to the album, on March 27, 2019, as the soundtrack's lead single. Anitta's track "Ugly" was also released prior to the album's release.

== Track listing ==
No.	Title	Writer(s)	Producer(s)	Length
1.	"Broken & Beautiful" (Kelly Clarkson)	Alecia Moore; Steve Mac; Johnny McDaid; Marshmello	Mac; Marshmello	3:38
2.	"Couldn't Be Better" (Kelly Clarkson) (Pop Version)	Christopher Lennertz; Glenn Slater	Jesse Shatkin	3:31
3.	"Today's the Day" (Kelly Clarkson)	Lennertz; Slater	Shatkin	0:31
4.	"Couldn't Be Better" (Kelly Clarkson & UglyDolls cast) (Movie Version)	Lennertz; Slater	Shatkin	4:16
5.	"Today's the (Perfect) Day" (UglyDolls cast)	Lennertz; Slater	Lennertz; Juliana Hatfield	1:41
6.	"The Ugly Truth" (Nick Jonas)	Lennertz; Slater	Davy Nathan; Philsmeeze	3:43
7.	"You Make My Dreams" (Pentatonix)	Daryl Hall; John Oates; Sara Allen	PTX; Ben Bram	2:26
8.	"The Uglier Truth" (Nick Jonas)	Lennertz; Slater; Scott Kirkland	The Crystal Method	0:37
9.	"All Dolled Up" (Janelle Monáe featuring Kelly Clarkson)	Lennertz; Slater	Mayer Hawthorne; Nathan; Philsmeeze^{[a]}	3:48
10.	"Unbreakable" (Janelle Monáe & Kelly Clarkson)	Lennertz; Slater; Kirkland; Keith Harrison; Laura Harrison	Shatkin; The Crystal Method	3:24
11.	"The Big Finale" (UglyDolls cast)	Lennertz; Slater	Jerry Harrison	3:31
12.	"Girl in the Mirror" (Bebe Rexha)	Jonas Jeberg; Neil Ormandy; Ingrid Andress	Jeberg; Jussifer	2:38
13.	"Ugly" (Anitta) (English Version)	Jayson DeZuzio; Stefan Johnson; Jordan Johnson; Sizzy Rocket; Sophie Rose Abrams	The Monsters & Strangerz	3:12
14.	"Don't Change" (Why Don't We)	Louis Schoorl; JHart; Marco Borrero; Daniel Seavey; Jonny Price; Corbyn Besson; Jonah Marais	Mag; Schoorl	2:56
15.	"Wallflowers & Weeds" (Blake Shelton)	Jason Gantt; Scott Stepakoff; Ivy Walker; Sophie Walker	Scott Johnson; Scott Hendricks	3:18
16.	"Ugly" (Anitta) (Spanish Version^{[b]})	Jean Rodriguez; DeZuzio; S. Johnson; J. Johnson; Rocket; Abrams	The Monsters & Strangerz	3:13

Notes

- ^a signifies an additional producer
- ^b there is a Portuguese version also performed by Anitta

== Charts ==
Chart (2019)	Peak position
US Billboard 200	182
US Top Album Sales (Billboard)	67
US Kid Albums (Billboard)	1
US Soundtrack Albums (Billboard)	10
