= Why Don't We =

American boy band

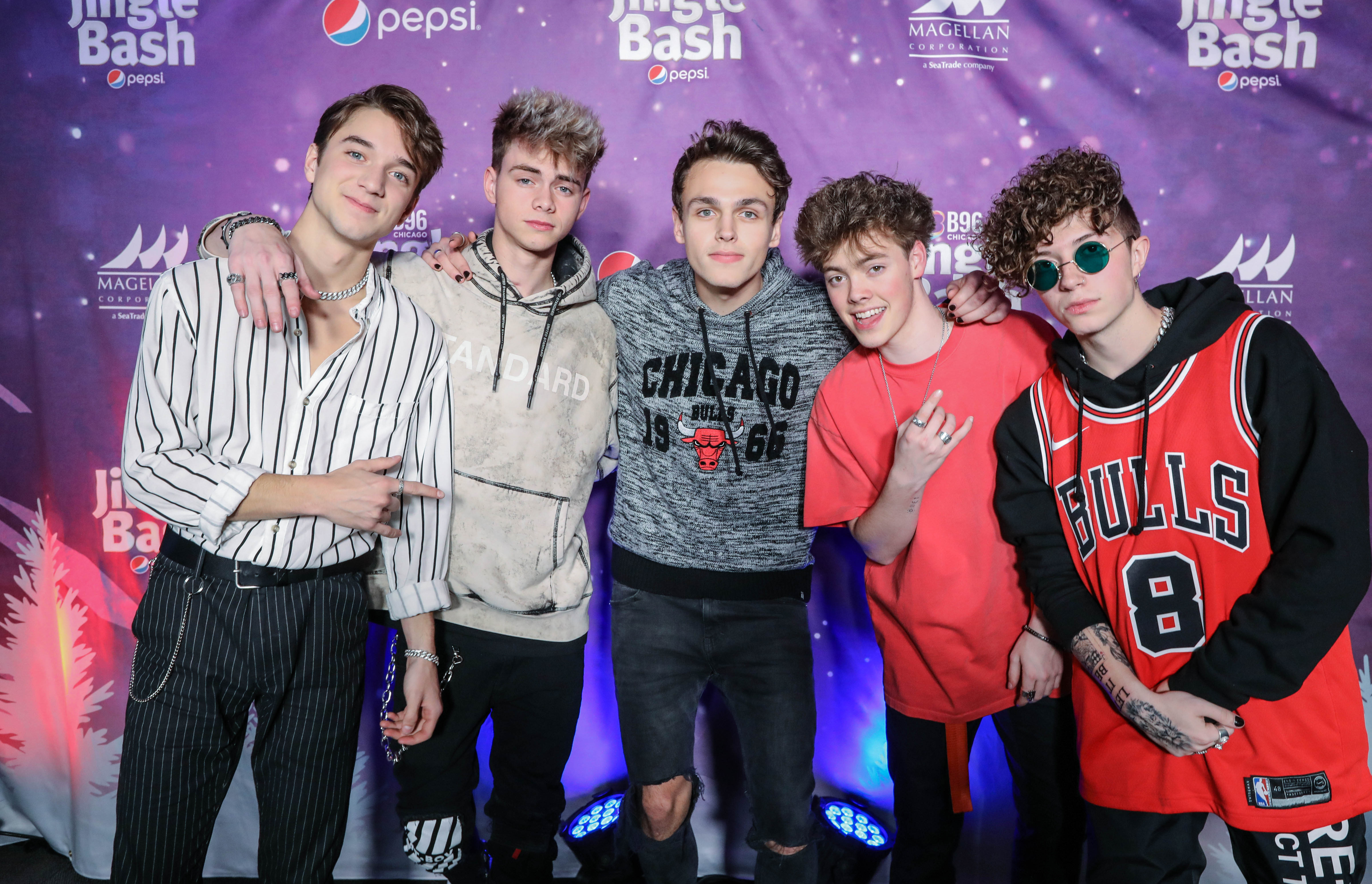
- Why Don't We at the 2018 B96 Jingle Bash in Chicago. From left to right: Daniel Seavey, Corbyn Besson, Jonah Marais, Zach Herron, and Jack Avery.

Background information
- Origin: Los Angeles, California, U.S.
- Genres: Pop; pop rock
- Years active: 2016–2022
- Label: Atlantic
- Past members: Jack Avery; Corbyn Besson; Zach Herron; Jonah Marais; Daniel Seavey

Why Don't We, shortened to wdw, was an American boy band consisting of Jack Avery, Corbyn Besson, Zach Herron, Jonah Marais and Daniel Seavey. They formed in 2016 and released two studio albums and six extended plays. Because of a lawsuit, the group took a hiatus and cancelled their tour in 2022, and eventually lost the rights to the group name in February 2025, marking the official end of the group.

== History ==
=== 2016–2017: Career beginnings ===
The band originally formed on September 27, 2016, after having all met in Los Angeles, California a year prior. On October 20, 2016, the group released their debut single "Taking You", a track from their debut EP, Only the Beginning, which was released on November 25 of the same year. They embarked on their first headlining tour, the "Taking You Tour", the next year. Their second EP, Something Different, was released on April 21, 2017. Following the release of their second EP, they embarked on the "Something Different Tour", their second headlining tour. The group's third EP, Why Don't We Just, was released on June 2, 2017. In September 2017, the band signed with Atlantic Records. That same month, Invitation, their fourth EP, was released. On November 23, 2017, they released their fifth EP, A Why Don't We Christmas. In 2018, in support of the Invitation EP, they headlined the "Invitation Tour". Additionally, the band has appeared in several vlogs of YouTuber Logan Paul.

=== 2018–2019: 8 Letters and 12/12 era ===
On August 31, 2018, they released their first album, 8 Letters. The record debuted at number nine on the US Billboard 200, and was preceded by three singles: "Hooked", "Talk", and "8 Letters". In March 2019, they embarked on the "8 Letters Tour".

Why Don't We released a new song each month (except September) in 2019. On January 16, they released "Big Plans", and a music video was released three days later. The song received a gold certification from the RIAA in April 2020. On Valentine's Day, the group released "Cold In LA", along with a music video two days later. On March 20, 2019, they released the humorous song "I Don't Belong in This Club" featuring American rapper Macklemore. It was certified gold by the RIAA in August 2020. On April 20, the group released "Don't Change", which was featured on the soundtrack album of the animated film UglyDolls. In May, the group unveiled their fifth song of the year, "Unbelievable". In June, they released "Come To Brazil", inspired by fans frequently asking them to visit the country. On July 26, the band released the song "I Still Do". On August 23, they released "What Am I", penned by Ed Sheeran, who previously wrote "Trust Fund Baby". The song was certified gold by the RIAA in June of the following year. On October 25, they released "Mad At You". The following month, the group released the Christmas song "With You This Christmas". On December 30, the group released their eleventh and final song of 2019, "Chills". The group then took a nine-month break shortly after the music video release.

=== 2020–2025: The Good Times and the Bad Ones, lawsuit and dissolution ===
On September 29, 2020, the band released "Fallin' (Adrenaline)", the lead single from their second album, The Good Times and the Bad Ones. It debuted at number 37 on the US Billboard Hot 100 chart, their first ever entry. Their second single from the album, "Lotus Inn", was released on December 4, 2020. They starred in a YouTube documentary titled 30 Days With, which showed the last stages of development and behind the scenes content of their then-upcoming album for 30 days. Their third single from the album, "Slow Down", was released on December 17, 2020. On January 15, 2021, The Good Times and The Bad Ones released. The album was largely self-produced, though it also features the productions of Travis Barker, Skrillex, and Timbaland. The album debuted at number 3 on the Billboard 200 albums chart, making it their highest entry on the chart.

The band released the single "Love Back" on October 6, 2021. The band then released a cover of Justin Bieber's "Mistletoe" in December that same year. In January 2022, they released their next single in collaboration with Jonas Blue: "Don't Wake Me Up", followed by "Let Me Down Easy (Lie)" in April, “Just Friends” on May 13, and “How Do You Love Somebody” on May 31.

The band's North American tour, The Good Times Only Tour, was scheduled to commence in June 2022, but was canceled due to the litigation between Why Don't We manager Randy Phillips and former manager David Loeffler. The band rescheduled the tour with new dates beginning in July. However, on July 6, the band announced that due to ongoing legal battles with their former management, they would be cancelling the tour and taking a hiatus.

After four years of legal battles, a trial was finally held in February 2025. Concluding on February 27, it ended with a mixed verdict. The members (excluding Daniel) would only need to pay a dollar each for breach of contract, but they lost the rights to the Why Don't We name and brand to Signature. With this verdict, the band officially ended.

== Musical influences ==
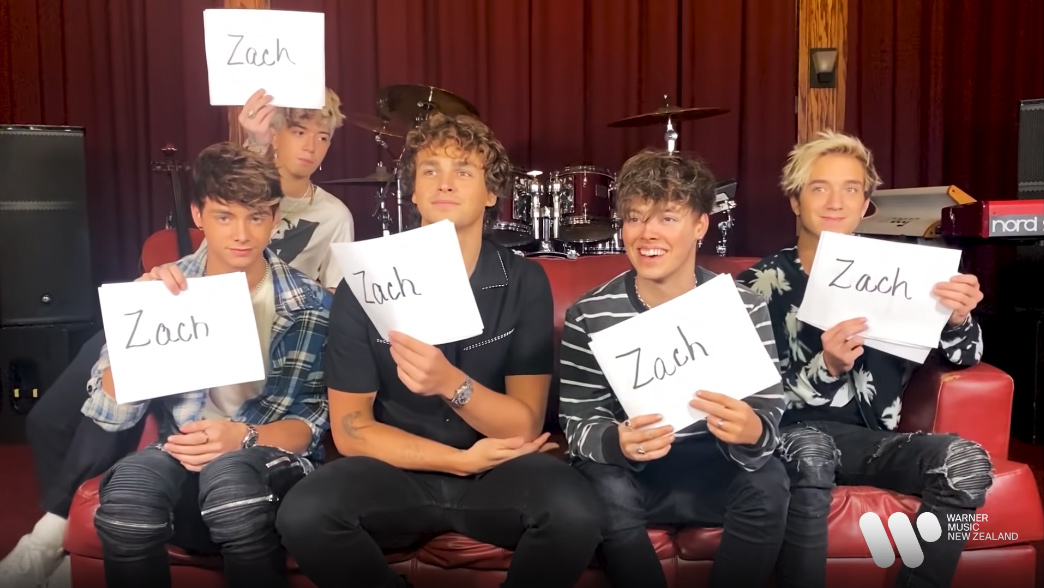
Why Don't We prior to their second album release

The band has cited Justin Bieber as their main musical inspiration, in addition to 5 Seconds of Summer, Boyz II Men, The Beatles, Drake, Ed Sheeran, Childish Gambino, Jon Bellion, Post Malone, Frank Ocean and CNCO.

== Band members ==
=== Jack Robert Avery ===
Jack Robert Avery (born July 1, 1999) was born in Burbank, California, but raised in Susquehanna, Pennsylvania. Avery released a solo single titled "Liar" in 2016 and was part of the meet-and-greet tour "Impact", of which members Zach Herron and Corbyn Besson were also part. He also starred in a short film called Fearless Five. On April 22, 2019, Avery's former girlfriend, Gabriela Gonzalez, gave birth to their daughter. Avery released his first solo song, "Please Don't Go", on June 27, 2025. He then released a second single, titled APHRODITE, on September 12, 2025, followed by Take the Wheel on November 21st, 2025, and XOXOX on February 6th, 2026.

On May 19, 2026, Avery's former partner, Gabriela Lauren Gonzalez (born September 6, 2001), a social media influencer, along with her father, Francisco Gonzalez (born December 23, 1966), and another former boyfriend of Gabriela, Kai Faron Cordrey (born October 13, 1999), were formally charged with conspiring to commit homicide. The allegations pertain to an attempted murder plot orchestrated during a custody dispute over Gonzalez's and Avery's currently seven-year-old daughter, which occurred from 2020 to 2021. Gonzalez is alleged to have recruited her father and Cordrey to engage a hitman via the dark web. Each individual has been charged with one count of attempted murder, conspiracy to commit murder, and solicitation of murder.

=== Corbyn Matthew Besson ===
Corbyn Matthew Besson (born November 25, 1998) was born in Dallas, Texas, but raised in Virginia. Besson went to high school in Centreville, Virginia. Besson's cousins are the Dutch girl group Ogene. Before cofounding Why Don't We, he had a following on YouNow and released a solo single titled "The Only One" to iTunes in 2014. His other acoustic single, "Marathon", was also released on the platform. After Why Don't We went on hiatus, Besson released two singles on his own: "Love Me Better", a song originally recorded and written by Why Don't We, on February 7, 2024, and "Like That" (featuring Armani White) on April 12, 2024. On August 2, 2024, Besson released the song "Panic", a collaboration with Swedish duo NOTD. They released a piano version of the song titled "Panic (After Hours)" on September 13, 2024. Besson released the single "Don't Run" along with a music video on October 2, 2024. On September 9, 2025, Besson announced he would be collaborating on the single "Blink" with K-pop idol and Twice member Tzuyu. On January 16th, 2026, Besson released his debut EP Head First.

=== Zachary Dean Herron ===
Zachary Dean Herron (born May 27, 2001), the youngest member of the group, was raised in Dallas, Texas. Growing up, he sang in the choir. Before Why Don't We, Herron covered songs on YouTube and also produced two singles himself: "Timelapse" and "Why". Herron released his first solo single since Why Don't We went on hiatus, called "Caroline", on July 26, 2024.

=== Jonah Marais Roth Frantzich ===
Jonah Marais (born June 16, 1998), the eldest member of the group, grew up in Stillwater, Minnesota. Before Why Don't We, Marais had a following on YouNow, released an album, When the Daylight's Gone, in 2016, and went on the 2014 DigiTour. Alongside Seavey, Marais co-wrote "I Got You" for Twice in 2024. On June 7, 2024, Marais released two solo songs: "Twisted Lullaby" and "Heaven". On June 28, 2024, Marais released a five-track mixtape titled The Jonah Marais Mixtape. On November 15, 2024, Marais released the song "Slow Motion", a collaboration with American record producer Ryan Lewis. As of 2025, he has released three EPs, with More Than Enough released on May 16, 2025. On January 5, 2026, Jonah announced his engagement to singer-songwriter Zia Victoria.

=== Daniel James Seavey ===
Daniel James Seavey (born April 2, 1999), born in Vancouver, Washington. He grew up in Portland, Oregon. He served as the main producer on the band's second album and can play over 20 instruments by ear. As a child, his father would take him to do street performances on the city's art walks. Seavey competed on season 14 of American Idol and finished in ninth place. He has also released multiple songs on his own, including his newest singles "Bleed on Me", "Can We Pretend That We're Good?", "Runaway" and "I Tried". The songs were featured on his debut EP Dancing in the Dark, released August 11, 2023. Seavey released the single "The Older You Get" on May 9, 2024. The song is the first single from his debut album, "Second Wind". Seavey released the song "Other People" on August 30, 2024. On January 31, 2025, Seavey released "Second Wind", another track from his debut album Second Wind, which was released on March 7, 2025.

== Tours ==
Headlining

- Taking You Tour (2017)
- Something Different Tour (2017)
- Invitation Tour (2018)
- 8 Letters Tour (2019)

Cancelled

- The Good Times Only Tour (2022)

== Discography ==
- 8 Letters (2018)
- The Good Times and the Bad Ones (2021)

== Awards and nominations ==
=== iHeartRadio MMVAs ===
Year	Nominee / work	Award	Result	Ref.
2018	Themselves	Fan Fave New Artist	Nominated	

=== iHeartRadio Music Awards ===
Year	Nominee / work	Award	Result	Ref.
2018	Themselves	Best Boy Band	Nominated	
2019	Limelights	Best Fan Army	Nominated	
2019	Zack Caspary	Favorite Tour Photographer	Nominated	
2020	Limelights	Best Fan Army	Nominated	
2020	Zack Caspary	Favorite Tour Photographer	Won	

=== MTV Europe Music Awards ===
Year	Nominee / work	Award	Result	Ref.
2018	Themselves	Best Push	Nominated	

=== MTV Video Music Awards ===
Year	Nominee / work	Award	Result	Ref.
2018	Themselves	Push Artist of the Year	Nominated	
2019	Themselves	Best Group	Nominated	

=== Nickelodeon Kids' Choice Awards ===
Year	Nominee / work	Award	Result	Ref.
2018	Themselves	Favorite Musical YouTube Creator	Nominated	
2019	Themselves	Favorite Social Music Star	Nominated	

=== Radio Disney Music Awards ===
Year	Nominee / work	Award	Result	Ref.
2018	Themselves	Best New Artist	Nominated	
2018	"These Girls"	Best Song to Lip Sync to	Nominated	

=== Teen Choice Awards ===
Year	Nominee / work	Award	Result	Ref.
2018	Themselves	Choice Music Group	Nominated	
2018	"Trust Fund Baby"	Choice Song: Group	Nominated	
2019	Themselves	Choice Music Group	Won	
2019	Themselves	Choice Summer Group	Nominated	
2019	"8 Letters"	Choice Song: Group	Nominated	
