= 8 Letters =

Studio album by Why Don't We
- Released: August 31, 2018
- Recorded: 2016–2018
- Genre: Pop
- Length: 26:15
- Label: Signature Entertainment: Atlantic; Warner
- Producer: The Monsters and the Strangerz; Louis Schoorl; Mick Schultz; Jonas Jeberg; Cutfather; Jacob Manson; Steve Mac; Borgeous; R3hab

Why Don't We chronology
| A Why Don't We Christmas (2017) | 8 Letters (2018) | Spotify Singles (2018) |

Why Don't We studio album chronology
| 8 Letters (2018) | The Good Times and the Bad Ones (2021) |

Singles from 8 Letters
- 1. "Hooked" Released: June 7, 2018; 2. "Talk" Released: July 6, 2018; 3. "8 Letters" Released: August 19, 2018

8 Letters is the debut full-length studio album by American boy band Why Don't We. The album was released on August 31, 2018, by Signature Entertainment & Atlantic Records in the United States and by Warner Music Group elsewhere. The album was supported by three singles: "Hooked", "Talk" and the title-track "8 Letters".

== Critical reception ==
Chris DeVille of Stereogum described the songs as "sometimes painfully adolescent in terms of subject matter", but praised the album's variety, songwriting, and production "that keeps them from feeling like a relic". Elias Leight of Rolling Stone gave the album a negative review, scoring it 1.5 out of 5 stars, criticizing the short length while stating the band "throws out eight new songs with little to show for it."

== Singles ==
"Hooked" was released as the lead single from the album on June 7, 2018. The song peaked at number twenty-two on the US Bubbling Under Hot 100 Singles chart. "Talk" was released as the second single from the album on July 6, 2018. The song peaked at number eighteen on the US Bubbling Under Hot 100 Singles chart. "8 Letters" was released as the third single from the album on August 19, 2018. The song peaked at number fourteen on the US Bubbling Under Hot 100 Singles chart.

== Chart performance ==
8 Letters was released on August 31, 2018, in the United States and debuted at number nine on the US Billboard 200 with first-week sales of 44,000 album equivalent units of which 37,000 were pure album sales, dated September 15, 2018. The album entered the Canadian Albums Chart at number fifteen. The album debuted at number ten in Australia. On September 7, 2018, the album entered the UK Albums Chart at number twenty-five, before dropping out the chart the following week.

== Track listing ==
8 Letters – Standard edition
| No. | Title | Writer(s) | Producer(s) | Length |
|---|---|---|---|---|
| 1. | "8 Letters" | James Abrahart; Jonny Price; Jordan Johnson; Marcus Lomax; Stefan Johnson | The Monsters and the Strangerz | 3:10 |
| 2. | "Talk" | Carl Lehrmann; Hayley Gene Penner | Louis Schoorl | 3:10 |
| 3. | "Choose" | Why Don't We; Mick Schultz; Hue Strother; Charles Hinshaw | Schultz | 2:53 |
| 4. | "In Too Deep" | Candice Pillay; Ingrid Andress; Troy Johnson; Jonas Jeberg | Jeberg | 3:14 |
| 5. | "Friends" | Daniel Davidsen; Ed Drewett; Iain James; Mich Hansen; Peter Wallevik | Cutfather; PhD | 3:34 |
| 6. | "Hard" | Schultz; Maureen McDonald | Schultz | 3:16 |
| 7. | "Hooked" | Jacob Manson; Philip John Plested | Manson | 3:24 |
| 8. | "Can't You See" | Why Don't We; Schultz; Hinshaw | Schultz | 3:34 |
| Total length: | | | | 26:15 |

8 Letters – Deluxe edition
| No. | Title | Writer(s) | Producer(s) | Length |
|---|---|---|---|---|
| 9. | "Trust Fund Baby" | Ed Sheeran; Fred Gibson | Steve Mac | 3:16 |
| 10. | "Hooked" (Borgeous remix) | Manson; Plested | Manson; Borgeous | 3:13 |
| 11. | "8 Letters" (R3hab remix) | Abrahart; Price; Johnson; Lomax; Johnson | The Monsters and the Strangerz; R3hab | 2:12 |
| Total length: | | | | 34:36 |

Japanese edition bonus tracks
| No. | Title | Writer(s) | Producer(s) | Length |
|---|---|---|---|---|
| 9. | "Trust Fund Baby" | Sheeran; Fred Gibson | Mac | 3:05 |
| 10. | "These Girls" | Manson; Plested | Manson; Borgeous | 2:49 |
| 11. | "Something Different" | Troy "R8DIO" Johnson; Candice Pillay | | 2:42 |
| Total length: | | | | 34:51 |

Japanese limited edition bonus DVD
| No. | Title | Director(s) | Length |
|---|---|---|---|
| 1. | "Trust Fund Baby" (music video) | Jason Koenig |
| 2. | "Hooked" (music video) | Eli Sokhn |
| 3. | "Something Different" (music video) | Logan Paul |
| 4. | "These Girls" (music video) | Eli Sokhn; Paul |
| 5. | "Talk" (music video) | Sokhn |

Notes

- As seen on physical copies, "Can't You See" was originally titled "Falling". It was retitled after the release of their track "Fallin' (Adrenaline)".

== Charts ==
| Chart (2018) | Peak position |
|---|---|
| Australian Albums (ARIA) | 10 |
| Austrian Albums (Ö3 Austria) | 42 |
| Belgian Albums (Ultratop Flanders) | 21 |
| Belgian Albums (Ultratop Wallonia) | 126 |
| Canadian Albums (Billboard) | 15 |
| Dutch Albums (Album Top 100) | 17 |
| Finnish Albums (Suomen virallinen lista) | 38 |
| Irish Albums (OCC) | 12 |
| Italian Albums (FIMI) | 96 |
| Japan Hot Albums (Billboard Japan) | 93 |
| Japanese Albums (Oricon) | 42 |
| Norwegian Albums (VG-lista) | 38 |
| Portuguese Albums (AFP) | 24 |
| Scottish Albums (OCC) | 18 |
| Spanish Albums (PROMUSICAE) | 11 |
| Swiss Albums (Schweizer Hitparade) | 87 |
| UK Albums (OCC) | 25 |
| US Billboard 200 | 9 |
| US Top Album Sales (Billboard) | 3 |

== Certifications ==
| Region | Certification | Certified units/sales |
|---|---|---|
| Singapore (RIAS) | Platinum | 10,000^{*} |
^{*} Sales figures based on certification alone.

== Release history ==
| Region | Date | Format | Label |
|---|---|---|---|
| United States | August 31, 2018 | Digital download; streaming; CD | Atlantic; Warner |
