= Daniel Seavey =

American singer-songwriter (born 1999)

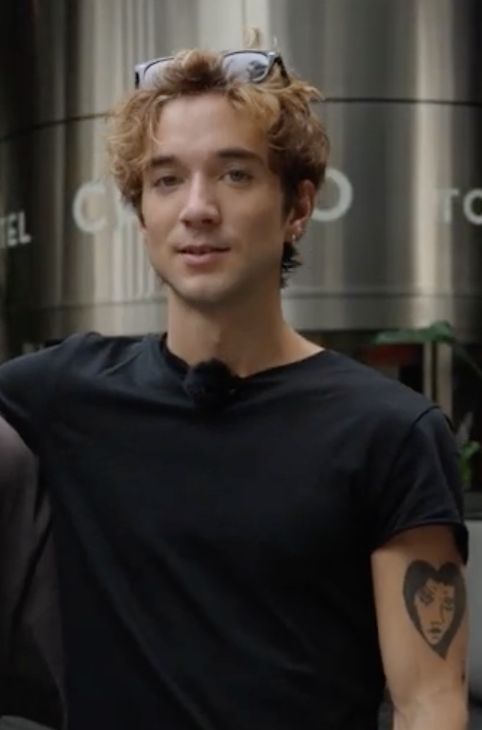
- Seavey in 2024
- Born: Daniel James Seavey; April 2, 1999 (age 27); Vancouver, Washington, U.S.
- Education: Union High School
- Occupations: Singer; songwriter; musician; record producer
- Years active: 2014–present
- Musical career
- Genre: Pop rock
- Instruments: Vocals; guitar; bass; keyboards; drums; cello
- Label: Atlantic
- Formerly of: Why Don't We
- Website: danielseavey.com

Daniel James Seavey (born April 2, 1999) is an American singer-songwriter. He first gained national attention as a contestant on the fourteenth season of American Idol in 2015, where he placed in the Top 9. He later rose to prominence as a founding member of the boy band Why Don't We. The band released five extended plays and two albums, both of which reached the top 10 on the Billboard 200 chart, before going on hiatus in 2022.

Following the group's hiatus, Seavey released his debut single "Can't We Pretend That We're Good" in November 2022. In 2023, he embarked on his first headlining tour Introducing Daniel Seavey and released his debut EP, Dancing in the Dark.

In 2024, Seavey released "The Older You Get", the first single from his forthcoming debut album, Second Wind. He also supported fellow American Idol alum Benson Boone on the European leg of Boone's The Fireworks & Rollerblades World Tour in June 2024 as well as Dean Lewis on Lewis' The Epilogue World Tour in October 2024.

== Early life ==
Daniel James Seavey was born on April 2, 1999 in Vancouver, Washington, the son of Keri Seavey, a religious writer and speaker, and Jeff Seavey, a Christian church pastor. One of four children, Seavey has three siblings: two older brothers, Christian and Tyler, and a younger sister, Anna.

Seavey has been playing music since the age of 4, when he stole his sister's pink toy Barbie piano and played "Twinkle, Twinkle, Little Star" by ear. His parents then bought him every secondhand instrument they could afford including a saxophone, banjo, bass, and drums. By the time he was 10, he could play a number of instruments and was writing and singing original songs. Around this time, inspired by his father's enthusiasm, his interest in performing was sparked. Seavey began playing in talent shows, singing Train's "Hey, Soul Sister", and he and his father started making YouTube videos together and traveling to nearby Portland, Oregon to perform during the First Thursday Art Walks. Seavey would busk using speakers and a keyboard that his father borrowed from their church and his first performance, which was Adele's "Someone Like You", ended up attracting a crowd of over 300 people.

With his busking money, Seavey continued to buy instruments for his bedroom studio, eventually learning to play over 20.

== Career ==
=== 2014–2015: American Idol ===
In September 2014, at the age of 15, Seavey auditioned for the fourteenth season of American Idol in San Francisco, singing renditions of Leonard Cohen's "Hallelujah" and Paula Abdul's "Straight Up" for judges Harry Connick Jr., Jennifer Lopez, and Keith Urban. Seavey advanced to Hollywood week which aired in four parts over two weeks. Contestants participated in three rounds with Seavey performing Ed Sheeran's "Thinking Out Loud" in the acapella round, One Direction's "Story of My Life" in the group round, and Sheeran's "I See Fire" in the solo round. After Hollywood Week, Seavey again performed Abdul's "Straight Up" in the showcase round in front of a live audience at the House of Blues in Los Angeles, California. Seavey then progressed to the semifinals, which were filmed at The Fillmore in Detroit, Michigan, as the youngest Top 24 finalist in Idol history. Seavey was the first 15-year-old finalist since the age of eligibility was lowered in the show's tenth season. He continued to advance through the rounds, ultimately reaching the Top 9 before being eliminated after his performance of Hall & Oates' "You Make My Dreams" on April 1, 2015.

American Idol season 14 performances and results
| Episode | Theme | Song(s) | Original artist(s) | Result |
|---|---|---|---|---|
| Auditions | Auditioner's choice | "Hallelujah" "Straight Up" | Leonard Cohen Paula Abdul | Advanced |
| Hollywood Week (Pt. 1) | Acapella | "Thinking Out Loud" | Ed Sheeran | Advanced |
| Hollywood Week (Pt. 2) | Group performance | "Story of My Life" | One Direction | Advanced |
| Hollywood Week (Pt. 3) | Solo | "I See Fire" | Ed Sheeran | Advanced |
| House of Blues (Top 48) | Contestant's choice | "Straight Up" | Paula Abdul | Advanced |
| Top 24 | Contestant's choice | "I'm Yours" | Jason Mraz | Safe |
| Top 16 | Music of Motown | "How Sweet It Is (To Be Loved by You)" | Marvin Gaye | Safe |
| Top 12 | "Back to the Start" | "Straight Up" | Paula Abdul | Safe |
| Top 11 (week 1) | "Get the Party Started" | "Happy" | Pharrell Williams | Safe |
| Top 11 (week 2) | Songs from the Movies | "Lost Stars" | Adam Levine | Safe |
| Top 9 | Songs from the 1980s | "You Make My Dreams" | Hall & Oates | Eliminated |

=== 2015–2022: Why Don't We ===
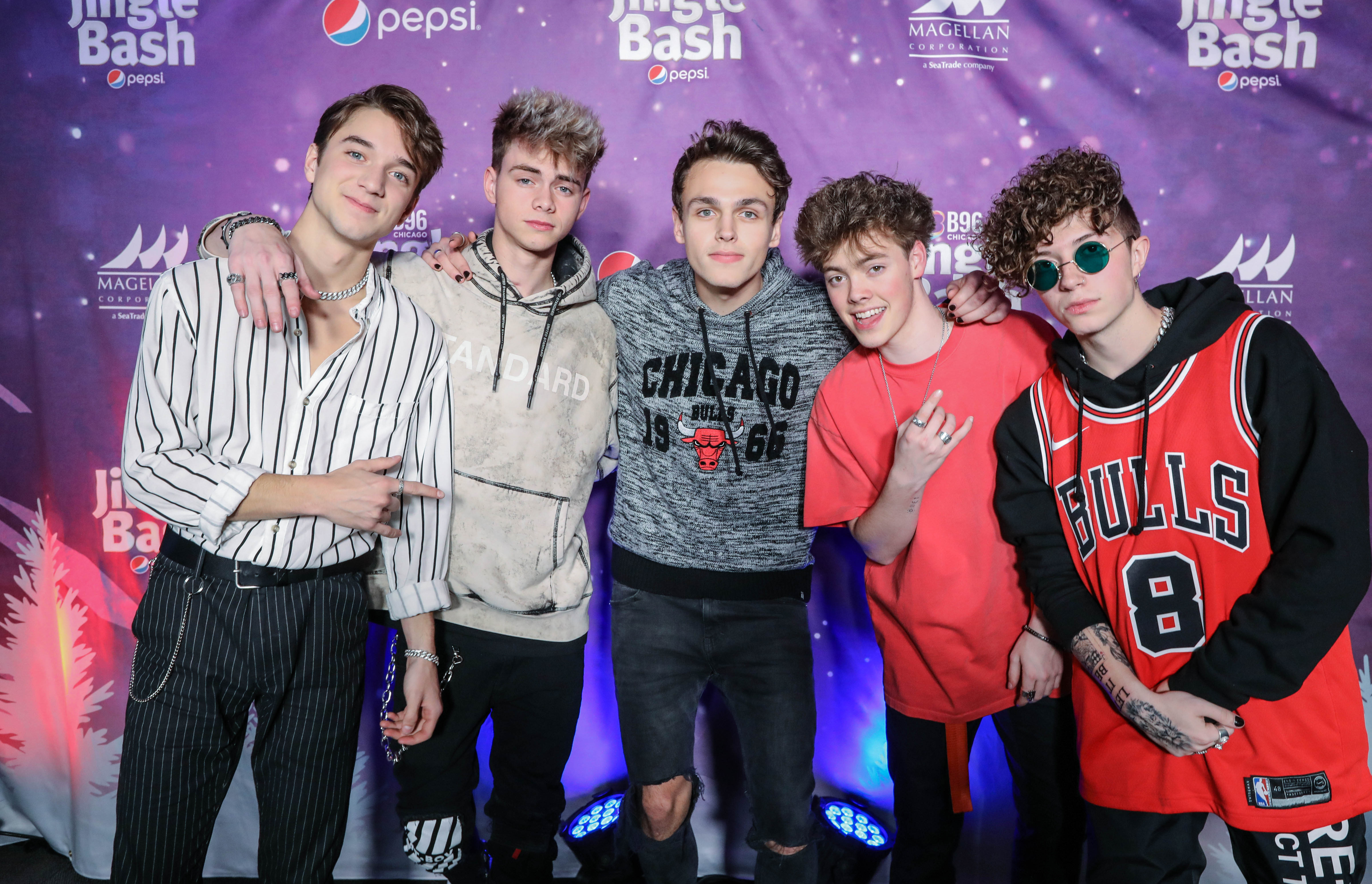
Seavey (left) with Why Don't We at the B96 Pepsi Jingle Bash 2018

Following his elimination from American Idol, Seavey returned to high school where he continued to perform, including a short stint as the opening act for Harry Connick Jr. on his summer 2015 tour, and post covers on his YouTube channel. The following year, Seavey went to Los Angeles to meet Jack Avery, Corbyn Besson, Zach Herron, and Jonah Marais. At the time, all five of them had popular YouTube channels and were releasing songs and performing as solo acts or in groups. On September 27, 2016, the five singers decided to join forces and form the group Why Don't We.

Only a month after forming, on October 20, 2016, the group released their debut single "Taking You" from their debut EP, Only the Beginning, which was released on November 25 of the same year. They embarked on their first headlining tour, the "Taking You Tour", the next year. Their second EP, Something Different, was released on April 21, 2017 which included the song "Made For" which Seavey co-wrote. Additionally, Seavey co-wrote all five songs on the group's third EP, Why Don't We Just, which was released on June 2, 2017 and topped the iTunes Pop Albums Chart following its release. In September 2017, the band signed with Atlantic Records. That same month, Invitation, their fourth EP, was released. On November 23, 2017, they released their fifth EP, A Why Don't We Christmas, which included two tracks co-wrote by Seavey. In 2018, in support of Invitation, they embarked on their third headlining tour the Invitation Tour.

On August 31, 2018, they released their first full-length album, 8 Letters which included two tracks co-wrote by Seavey. The album debuted at number nine on the Billboard 200 and number 25 on the UK Albums Chart. In March 2019, the band embarked on the 92 show 8 Letters Tour. While on tour, the group released a string of singles, many of which Seavey co-wrote. Seavey also earned his first production credits during this time, co-producing the group's singles "Cold in LA" and "Come to Brazil".

The group then took a nine-month break to create their second full-length album The Good Times and the Bad Ones. The album was largely written, recorded and produced by the band with Seavey co-writing, co-producing, and playing a variety of instruments on all 10 of the songs. On September 29, 2020, the band released "Fallin' (Adrenaline)", the lead single from the album. It debuted at number 37 on the US Billboard Hot 100 chart, their first ever entry. On January 15, 2021, The Good Times and The Bad Ones was released. The album debuted at number 3 on the Billboard 200 albums chart, making this their highest entry on the chart.

The band's North American tour, The Good Times Only Tour, was scheduled to commence in June 2022, but was canceled due to litigation between the band, their manager Randy Phillips, and former manager David Loeffler.

On July 6, 2022 the band announced that due to the legal battles with their former management, they would be going on hiatus. Their hiatus would eventually become permanent in February 2025, when the band lost the rights to the Why Don't We name and brand to Signature following a trial that ended with a mixed verdict, marking the official end of the band.

=== 2022–2023: Dancing In The Dark ===
On September 30, 2022, Seavey released his debut solo single "Can We Pretend That We're Good?". "Runaway", his second single, was released shortly after on December 9, 2022. With only two songs out, Seavey embarked on his first solo headlining tour Introducing Daniel Seavey in January 2023. He then released his third single "I Tried" on January 13, 2023 after debuting it on tour.

Seavey then took a six month break from releasing new music due to the ongoing litigation with his former management.

On August 11, 2023, Seavey surprise released his debut solo EP Dancing In The Dark which included his three previously released songs as well as four new tracks. Later that month, Seavey announced the Dancing in the Light tour in support of the EP. The tour was set to begin in October 2023 and make 23 stops across North America.

=== 2024–present: "The Older You Get" and Second Wind ===
In March 2024, Seavey started teasing a new song titled "The Older You Get" on his social media accounts. Before its official release, a trend emerged where fans would use the song to in nostalgic posts about the bands they grew up listening to. On April 23, 2024, Seavey announced that "The Older You Get" would be the first single from his debut album. The song was released two weeks later on May 10, 2024.

In January 2025, Seavey announced his debut album Second Wind as well as the accompanying Second Wind Tour.

== Artistry ==
=== Musical style and influences ===
Seavey's music has been described as pop, pop rock, and rock. The musical style on his debut single was called "a blend of rock, pop, and alternative with enticingly sharp and experimental production" by Billboard and "pop-rock fusion" by Ones To Watch. His debut EP was described as a "futuristic, pop-meets-glam-rock record" and "full of unexpected sounds that take inspiration from artists like Lana Del Rey and Cigarettes After Sex" by Rolling Stone.

Growing up, Seavey was greatly influenced by his parents' eclectic taste in music. His father listened to Christian hard rock bands, such as P.O.D. and Falling Up, and his mom listened to mainly female artists such as Norah Jones, Adele, and Madonna. Due to his father's job as a pastor, Seavey's exposure to secular music was limited until later in life. Eventually, as a junior in high school he heard Drake for the first time and began to listen to artists such as Hozier, The Weeknd, Mac Miller, and Kendrick Lamar. Seavey noted the latter two artists' work as well as Twenty One Pilots as inspiration for his second solo single "Runaway".

Seavey has also cited Ed Sheeran as someone he looks up to for his work ethic, as well as his "songwriting and how he strips everything down to an acoustic guitar". He has also mentioned Justin Bieber as an impactful artist, saying, "I used to get compared to him a lot. We both started out as street performers. I admire that he takes risks and is always pushing his own sound". He has also spoken on learning from Olivia Rodrigo about the "persistent effort to mine for creative ideas".

=== Stage performances ===
As a solo artist, Seavey has toured accompanied by only a drummer, Johannes Gritschacher. Seavey plays a number of instruments on stage, including the electric guitar and cello, in addition to providing vocals. Seavey often uses a loop pedal in his shows to create song arrangements live onstage by layering guitar, bass, keyboards, and vocals. He has cited Ed Sheeran's use of the loop pedal as his inspiration for this component of his performance.

Seavey has been described as an energetic performer whose performances are "dynamic, engaging, and thoroughly entertaining".

== Personal life ==
On November 24, 2022, Seavey confirmed his relationship with Katia Castellano in an Instagram post. Seavey has described Castellano as "The most beautiful girl I know, inside and out. She's an angel. I don't know how I ended up with her but I am very, very thankful."

As of 2016, Seavey lived in Los Angeles, California.

=== Stalking incidents ===
On July 28, 2022, a woman broke into Seavey's home in Los Angeles, California while he was out of town. Seavey's older brother Tyler called the police after spotting the woman on Seavey's security cameras sleeping in his bed, wearing his clothes, playing his instruments, and rummaging through his cabinets. The woman, who had shown up at his gym multiple times prior to this incident, was said to be an obsessed fan of Seavey. In October 2022, Seavey obtained a restraining order to ban the woman from contacting or coming near his home, family, or work for two years.

Despite the restraining order, the woman broke into Seavey's home again on December 18, 2022. The woman entered his bedroom and attempted to kiss him, forcing Seavey to physically remove her from his home and call the police. The woman was subsequently arrested for trespassing and violating the restraining order. Seavey did not press new charges against the woman.

== Discography ==
=== Studio albums ===
| Title | Details | Peak chart positions |
| Title | Details | AUS |
|---|---|---|
| Second Wind | Released: March 7, 2025; Label: Atlantic; Format: Digital download, streaming, vinyl, CD | 7 |

=== Extended plays ===
| Title | Details |
|---|---|
| Dancing in the Dark | Released: August 11, 2023; Label: Atlantic; Format: Digital download, streaming, vinyl, CD |

=== Singles ===
==== As lead artist ====
| Title | Year | Peak chart positions | Album |
| Title | Year | NZ Hot | Album |
|---|---|---|---|
| "Can We Pretend That We're Good" | 2022 | — | Dancing in the Dark |
| "Runaway" | 2022 | — | Dancing in the Dark |
| "I Tried" | 2023 | — | Dancing in the Dark |
| "Fall into You" | 2023 | — | Dancing in the Dark |
| "The Older You Get" | 2024 | — | Second Wind |
| "Other People" | 2024 | — | Second Wind |
| "Gateway Drug" | 2024 | — | Second Wind |
| "If I Ever Get to Heaven" | 2024 | — | Second Wind |
| "Second Wind" | 2025 | — | Second Wind |
| "Eden" | 2025 | — | Second Wind (Deluxe) |
| "Blame It On You" | 2025 | 35 | Non-album singles |
| "Time to Time (Annie)" | 2026 | — | Non-album singles |
| "Love's a Gun" | 2026 | — | Non-album singles |
| "Dream Crusher" | 2026 | — | Non-album singles |

==== Promotional singles ====
| Title | Year | Album |
|---|---|---|
| "Fix You" (with Dean Lewis) | 2024 | Non-album promotional single |

=== Other appearances ===
| Title | Year | Album |
|---|---|---|
| "Pray for Me" (Destiny Rogers featuring Daniel Seavey) | 2024 | Still Your Girl |

=== Music videos ===
| Title | Year | Director(s) |
|---|---|---|
| "Can We Pretend That We're Good" | 2022 | Evan Hara |
| "Runaway" | 2022 | Éli Sokhn |
| "The Older You Get" | 2024 | Miles Murphy |
| "Gateway Drug" | 2024 | Ian Lipton |
| "Second Wind" | 2025 | Austin Simkins |

=== Songwriting credits ===
List of credited work on songs for other artists, showing song title, year released, artist, album, and credits
| Title | Year | Artist | Album | Credits |
|---|---|---|---|---|
| "Made For" | 2016 | Why Don't We | Something Different | Songwriter |
| "Why Don't We Just" | 2017 | Why Don't We | Why Don't We Just | Songwriter |
| "All My Love" | 2017 | Why Don't We | Why Don't We Just | Songwriter |
| "I Depend on You" | 2017 | Why Don't We | Why Don't We Just | Songwriter |
| "Runner" | 2017 | Why Don't We | Why Don't We Just | Songwriter |
| "We the Party" | 2017 | Why Don't We | Why Don't We Just | Songwriter |
| "Hey Good Lookin" | 2017 | Why Don't We | A Why Don't We Christmas | Songwriter |
| "You and Me at Christmas" | 2017 | Why Don't We | A Why Don't We Christmas | Songwriter |
| "Help Me Help You" (featuring Why Don't We) | 2017 | Logan Paul | Non-album single | Songwriter |
| "Choose" | 2018 | Why Don't We | 8 Letters | Songwriter |
| "Can't You See" | 2018 | Why Don't We | 8 Letters | Songwriter |
| "Big Plans" | 2019 | Why Don't We | Non-album singles | Songwriter |
| "Cold in LA" | 2019 | Why Don't We | Non-album singles | Songwriter, producer |
| "Come to Brazil" | 2019 | Why Don't We | Non-album singles | Songwriter, producer |
| "With You This Christmas" | 2019 | Why Don't We | Non-album singles | Songwriter |
| "Chills" | 2019 | Why Don't We | Non-album singles | Songwriter |
| "Untitled Love Song" | 2019 | Henry | Non-album singles | Songwriter |
| "Don't Change" | 2019 | Why Don't We | UglyDolls (Original Motion Picture Soundtrack) | Songwriter, cello |
| "Who" (featuring BTS) | 2020 | Lauv | ~how i'm feeling~ | Songwriter |
| "Fallin' (Adrenaline)" | 2021 | Why Don't We | The Good Times and the Bad Ones | Songwriter, producer, recording engineer, keyboards, synthesizer, guitar, programming |
| "Slow Down" | 2021 | Why Don't We | The Good Times and the Bad Ones | Songwriter, producer, recording engineer, keyboards, synthesizer, guitar, bass |
| "Lotus Inn" | 2021 | Why Don't We | The Good Times and the Bad Ones | Songwriter, producer, recording engineer, keyboards, synthesizer, guitar, programming |
| "Be Myself" | 2021 | Why Don't We | The Good Times and the Bad Ones | Songwriter, producer, recording engineer, keyboards, synthesizer, guitar, programming |
| "Love Song" | 2021 | Why Don't We | The Good Times and the Bad Ones | Songwriter, producer, recording engineer, keyboards, synthesizer, guitar, programming |
| "Grey" | 2021 | Why Don't We | The Good Times and the Bad Ones | Songwriter, producer, recording engineer, keyboards, synthesizer, piano |
| "For You" | 2021 | Why Don't We | The Good Times and the Bad Ones | Songwriter, producer, recording engineer, keyboards, synthesizer, guitar, programming |
| "I'll Be Okay" | 2021 | Why Don't We | The Good Times and the Bad Ones | Songwriter, producer, recording engineer, keyboards, synthesizer, programming |
| "Look at Me" | 2021 | Why Don't We | The Good Times and the Bad Ones | Songwriter, producer, recording engineer, keyboards, synthesizer, guitar |
| "Stay" | 2021 | Why Don't We | The Good Times and the Bad Ones | Songwriter, producer, recording engineer, keyboards, synthesizer, guitar, programming |
| "Love Back" | 2021 | Why Don't We | Non-album singles | Songwriter, additional producer |
| "Don't Wake Me Up" (with Jonas Blue) | 2022 | Why Don't We | Non-album singles | Songwriter |
| "Let Me Down Easy (Lie)" | 2022 | Why Don't We | Non-album singles | Songwriter |
| "Just Friends" | 2022 | Why Don't We | Non-album singles | Songwriter |
| "How Do You Love Somebody" | 2022 | Why Don't We | Non-album singles | Songwriter |
| "My City" (with 24kGoldn & Kane Brown) | 2023 | G Herbo | Fast X (Original Motion Picture Soundtrack) | Songwriter |
| "I Got You" | 2024 | Twice | With You-th | Songwriter |
| "Love Me Better" | 2024 | Corbyn Besson | Non-album single | Songwriter |
| "Can't Stop" | 2025 | Tomorrow X Together | Starkissed | Songwriter, producer |

== Tours ==
Headlining

- Introducing Daniel Seavey (2023)
- Second Wind Tour (2025)

Supporting

- Harry Connick, Jr. – Summer Concert Tour (2015)
- Benson Boone – The Fireworks & Rollerblades World Tour (2024)
- Dean Lewis – The Epilogue World Tour (2024)
- Charlie Puth – Whatever's Clever! World Tour (2026)
