= All Fired Up! (tour) =

2011 concert tour by the Saturdays

- Tour by The Saturdays
- Associated album: On Your Radar
- Start date: 2 December 2011
- End date: 19 December 2011
- No. of shows: 13 in Europe

The Saturdays concert chronology
- Headlines Tour (2011); All Fired Up! Live (2011); Greatest Hits Live! (2014)

All Fired Up! was the third headlining concert tour by English-Irish girl group the Saturdays. It was their first tour of arenas and spanned early/mid December 2011. The tour began on 2 December in Bournemouth at the Windsor Hall and ended on 19 December at the O2 Dublin.

== Background ==
Whilst on The Headlines Tour in early 2011 the group revealed that they would be touring again later in the year. The tour dates were announced on the group's official website in June 2011 and originally consisted of twelve shows across the United Kingdom, consisting of a show for the Jingle Bell Ball. It was later announced that the tour was to travel to Belfast and Dublin taking the total number of dates to thirteen.

"I am overwhelmed by all of your wonderfully positive and kind well wishes. Thank you all soooo much. So much love, but just to reassure all Saturdays fans its all systems go and I will be remaining fully committed to the band and our Tour in December."

— Una Healy on tour after pregnancy announcement."

When speaking about the tour the group have mentioned that they would like to "fly" as it is one of their dreams. Rochelle Wiseman said "The thought that we are about to take on arenas sends a shiver down my spine, it's everything we've ever dreamed of as a band – and we know the end of the year is going to come around so fast. Playing an arena is a terrifying, but most exciting thought!" When the band spoke to Female First about the tour they said they want it to be their best tour yet and that there will be "lots of costume changes, sparkles and dancers". They said "It's an arena tour so we're forced to go all out for a big production." Mollie King said that fans should expect a lot of bright colours and brightly coloured blocks for the production. Una Healy said about the tour; "Well the tour is not until December but we’ve been busy auditioning dancers and we’re planning to discuss choreography in the next few weeks. We’re really busy with the album at the moment and that's due out in November so it's a busy time and we’re just trying to fit it all in."

The revelation of Una Healy's pregnancy in September 2011 meant fans began to question whether she would still appear on the tour. Healy, however, has confirmed that she will remain fully committed to the band, including the tour. Mollie King also revealed; "Una is so determined to do the tour – there is no way she’d want to drop out. She might want a few extra hours' sleep but people will have come to see the five of us and we are going to give them the best show possible." According to the band they will be introducing out the new album on the tour so all songs will be fresh, however they did say they will perform their old classics for the fans. They also said that they intend to have loads of dancers throughout the tour, loads of visuals and they said they will be getting involved in all the creative meetings and making sure they are styled up as a unit.

== Critical reception ==
All Fired Up Tour gained positive reviews. Daily Echo said; The vocals are strong, the harmonies tight, and the choreography slick and raunchy. Costumes are vibrant and colourful, lighting is dramatically effective, and the overhead projections imaginative. Superb use is made of stage equipment, with the girls magically appearing from trapdoors and the dancers tumbling into pits. Most of the numbers are stonkin' thumpers with the pounding "I Feel Alive" and the hooky "Just Can't Get Enough" outstanding, yet the occasional ballad works well, particularly "Wish I Didn't Know" and the quirky "Issues" with its edgy lyric: "...can’t decide if I should slap you or kiss you". The theatrical finale featured the girls popping out of Christmas present boxes in Santa coats to croon an almost jazzy version of "Winter Wonderland". The encore was their current single "My Heart Takes Over" as the stage slowly rotated and the snow gently fell. Performing to a packed-out arena, the Saturdays belted out a range of their hits from their four albums with a few added extras for their All Fired Up tour.

== Tickets ==
A limited number of VIP tickets were released for each venue. The £100 package included a meet and greet with the girls, a premium ticket in the front row of the venue, plus other bits and pieces to complete the VIP experience. The rest of the tickets are priced at £29–38 depending on their proximity to the stage and what website you visit. Various competitions on radio stations and websites also gave away free tickets to all the venues.

== Concert synopsis ==
The show began with a video introduction, which sees the girls as office secretaries, based on the fashions of the 1950s. Once the video finishes, the curtain drops and the audience is allowed to see the girls suspended above the stage, in a cage, imitating a grille lift. For the opening, they wear a colorful bras, white shirt and a diamante-festooned high-waisted black skirt, to imitate an office worker. Once the cage lowers to the stage, "Notorious" begins. Continuing with the office theme, "Work" is performed, with choreography mostly made on chairs, with their suited-up dancers. After the brief introductions to the audience, the dancers rip off the secretary dresses, revealing black, red and pink colored leotards. This happens at the breakdown intro to"Get Ready, Get Set". Old fashioned girdle microphone stands rise onto the stage before the girls sing 2009's "Forever Is Over", continuing with "Wish I Didn't Know". After the song, the girls exit the stage.

Whilst costume changing, the dancers are introduced. They individually show what they can do, as their names appear on the big screen. This happens to an instrumental opening of track "Faster", before the Saturdays return to the stage to perform the song, popping through the stage. They wear disheveled colorful, golden-chested dresses, with hoods and mirrored sunglasses. "Ego" continues the show, followed by "Do What You Want With Me". Due to performing heavy choreography, that she would not be able to do as for being pregnant, member Una Healy takes a break, whilst the remaining four members perform the song. Una Healy returns to the stage and the show moves on with the "Way You Watch Me". The shows second act carries on with "Issues", which sees Mollie King and Una Healy sat on the stairs on the right hand side of the stage, Rochelle Wiseman and Vanessa White on the left, and Frankie Sandford sat above the doors in the middle back of the stage. The section then finishes with "Just Can't Get Enough" with an extended outro.

Section 3 begins with a video introduction of the Wideboys remix of "Up". The group are then raised onto the stage on a single lift and perform the song wearing silver and jet dresses, shining with a huge array of sequins and diamonds. "If This Is Love" is performed as a mash up with the Maroon 5 and Christina Aguilera's hit single "Moves like Jagger". They then perform the song "For Myself", before the doors shut in front of them. An extended intro of "Last Call" is played, before the girls rise back on stage on a white chaise longue, still in their silver theme, and perform the rest of the song. White fabrics then drop down onto the stage, and they perform 2010's "Missing You". During the song, they imitate the 2011 "All Fired Up" single cover. "Promise Me", which, each night, they would dedicate to a different person in the crowd, continues the set, before "All Fired Up" finishes with a Fake Ending.

After a short pause, the dancers rise onto the stage wearing Santa trousers, topless and holding small presents. After a video interlude shows the girls at a younger age on Christmas. They then appear on stage in bigger presents wearing Santa coats with hoods. They then perform "Winter Wonderland", a traditional winter song they previously performed in Live Lounge in 2009. "My Heart Takes Over" sees the girls at the end of catwalk as snow falls around them in huge arenas such as Wembley Arena and Manchester Arena. They then take off the coats to reveal coloured shorts and white tops, and they sing "Higher" as the last song of the show. They exit through the stage lifts at the end of the song. The On Your Radar album cover appears on the big screen as this happens.

== Support acts ==
- Oh My! (4 songs)
- Daniela Brooker (5 songs)
- NVS (4 songs) www.nvsofficial.com

== Setlist ==
(Costume: Office Secretary dresses)

1. "Notorious"
2. "Work"

(Costume: Red, Black, Pink Coloured Leotards)

3. "Get Ready Get Set"
4. "Forever Is Over"
5. "Wish I Didn't Know"

(Costume: Multi Coloured Dresses With Hoods)

6. "Faster"
7. "Ego
8. "Do What You Want With Me" (as sexual choreography is used, Una Healy takes a break due to being pregnant and does not perform this song)
9. "The Way You Watch Me"
10. "Issues"
11. "Just Can't Get Enough"

(Costume: Silver Dresses)

12. "Up (Wideboys Edit)" (with Video Introduction)
13. "If This Is Love"/"Moves Like Jagger" (Maroon 5 cover)
14. "For Myself"
15. "Last Call"
16. "Missing You"
17. "Promise Me"
18. "All Fired Up"

(Costume: Santa Overcoats)

19. "Winter Wonderland"
20. "My Heart Takes Over"

(Costume: Shorts, White Tops)

21. "Higher"

== Tour dates ==
Date	City	Country	Venue
2 December 2011	Bournemouth	England	Windsor Hall
3 December 2011	Liverpool	England	Echo Arena Liverpool
5 December 2011	Cardiff	Wales	Motorpoint Arena Cardiff
6 December 2011	Brighton	England	Brighton Centre
8 December 2011	Birmingham	England	LG Arena
9 December 2011	Manchester	England	Manchester Evening News Arena
10 December 2011	Newcastle	England	Metro Radio Arena
12 December 2011	Nottingham	England	Capital FM Arena
13 December 2011	Glasgow	Scotland	Scottish Exhibition Hall 4
15 December 2011	Sheffield	England	Motorpoint Arena Sheffield
16 December 2011	London	England	Wembley Arena
18 December 2011	Belfast	Northern Ireland	Odyssey Arena
19 December 2011	Dublin	Ireland	O_{2} Dublin
