= On Your Radar =

Studio album by the Saturdays
- Released: 21 November 2011
- Recorded: August 2010 – September 2011
- Genres: Pop; dance-pop; electropop
- Length: 50:37
- Labels: Polydor; Fascination
- Producers: The Alias; Lucas Secon; Tracklacers; Steve Mac; Xenomania; Carl Falk; Rami Yacoub; Charlie Holmes

The Saturdays chronology
Headlines! (2010)	On Your Radar (2011)	Chasing the Saturdays (2013)

Singles from On Your Radar
- 1. "Notorious" Released: 20 May 2011; 2. "All Fired Up" Released: 4 September 2011; 3. "My Heart Takes Over" Released: 11 November 2011

On Your Radar is the third studio album by British–Irish girl group the Saturdays. It was released 21 November 2011 under Fascination Records. The album was recorded in London, New York City, Oslo and Stockholm. The group was more involved in the creative process of the album than with their previous works, being credited as co-writers on seven of the fourteen tracks. Steve Mac, who had been instrumental in the production of the band's previous albums, served as a producer on the album, with additional producers and songwriters also being included in the making of the record, including Lucas Secon, Taio Cruz, Labrinth, Tracklacers, Space Cowboy, Brian Higgins and Lucie Silvas.

On Your Radar was supported by its lead single "Notorious", which was released on 22 May 2011, and peaked at eight on the UK Singles Chart. Two further singles were released; "All Fired Up", which received positive reviews, and "My Heart Takes Over". To promote the album, the group performed on So You Think You Can Dance, with the group also embarking on their third headlining concert tour, the All Fired Up Tour.

== Background and development ==
The Saturdays' EP Headlines! (2010) served as a bridge between their 2009 album Wordshaker and their then-upcoming album. The band desired to take risks, with group member Mollie King declared their new sound as "dance floor music" during the recording process." When talking about the album's lead single "Notorious", group member Una Healy said that dance music is massive at the moment so it's a dance track, but it also has something unique behind it. Got this drop-out chorus where it's just the beat and you can only hear our voices – there aren't many tracks like that, so it's a bit different." Where in an interview with group member Vanessa White, she said their new music would be a lot "sexier" and "definitely a different sound" while also saying their sound is more R&B. White also said that the band have "grown as artists" since their first album Chasing Lights (2008).

Rochelle Humes, during the Headlines Tour in February 2011, confirmed that the band would be working with record producer Labrinth in the hope that he would write and produce a smash hit as he did with English rapper Tinie Tempah. The band also chose to work with Alphabeat and Taio Cruz. Space Cowboy, who co-produced Lady Gaga's "Just Dance" and "Poker Face", was also working on the upcoming album. On Twitter, it was revealed that Carl Falk and Rami Yacoub had been working in the studio with the band and recorded the album track "White Lies". Digital Spy reported that the band were working with Xenomania's Brian Higgins. The group also revealed that they have been in the studio "writing loads", but we're also going to go somewhere quite remote for a week and just work on loads of songs together". The band had written songs in studio and remote environments, and sometimes spent entire days writing lyrics. The group had written eight of the songs recorded as of May 2011. They stressed that they wanted to record as many songs as they could to make sure they give the album the best chance of becoming a commercial success and making it the best album to-date. The band confirmed that this album will be their first to be released globally as they are planning to break the European music market.

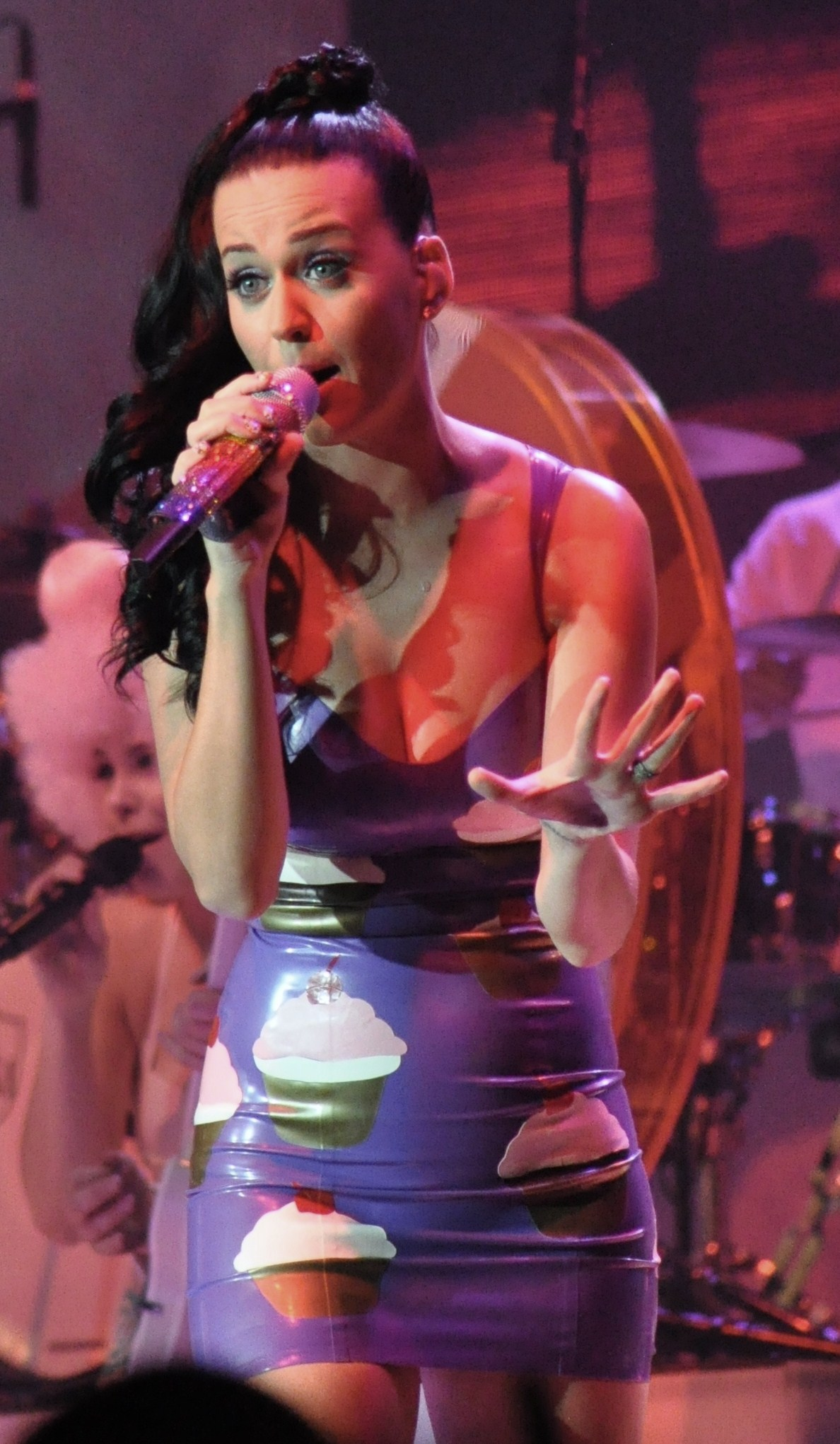
Katy Perry is one of the artists the band took influences from on the album.

Chipmunk was later revealed to be working with the band on the album, later revealing that he would feature on a remix of "Notorious". It was also reported that the group had begun working with Miranda Cooper, who had previously worked with Kylie Minogue, MNEK, and Tracklacers. The band stated that a lot of the songs are about love. White said that "All Fired Up" is definitely the "dancingest song" we've ever made and it's the "danciest" track on the album too, but there are lots of different styles on the album. She also said that the band had pretty much finished the album in September 2011.

== Artwork and titling ==
The album cover features the band from shoulders up, with a white and grey background. In an interview with Capital FM about the new album's artwork, the group stated "We can't tell you [the name] yet, but we just made the final approval of our album cover. You won't know what to expect because its so different. We are all naked for a start!" The group chose to go naked for the album cover due to "feeling exposed" as having written the majority of the album themselves, stating it will be a lot more personal than the previous three albums. It was confirmed on 29 September 2011 that the album would be titled On Your Radar, a lyric taken from the album's second single "All Fired Up". They also revealed that the artwork for the album would be released a week from 29 September 2011. The album cover was taken by Elisabeth Hoff. The band's logo is designed by a design studio titled Zip, which is featured on the album cover's image above the band.

== Composition and recording ==
"Our new album's going to be a lot sexier than our old one, it's definitely a different sound, we're really excited about it, We've all grown up a bit now and that shows. It's also a lot more R&B than anything we've done before, it's a very cool. Every time I think about the new single Notorious it makes me want to dance."

— Vanessa White

The album's lead single, "Notorious" is produced by Steve Mac has been described as "Black Eyed Peas-esque" saying their new music sounds like something The Black Eyed Peas or Rihanna would release. The band described the song's lyrics as "playful" with a "drop-out chorus" Wonderland magazine asked the band to describe their new music in five words. They responded with "current", "fun", "naughty", "girly" and "dancy" When Wonderland questioned the band asking if the whole album would be like "Notorious". Vanessa White said that the album was a work in progress. She said they want a massive bunch of songs to pick from and they'll get the best ones from that. Where Una Healy stated, "I think every artist needs to, sort of, reinvent themselves and we don't want any track to sound like it could have been on our previous albums. It's going to be a step up from the last album but we'll keep it The Saturdays-esque." Rochelle Humes said that "Notorious" does not influence the album's sound. She said that there are many different styles on the album, and they have records a fair few ballads. She went on to say that the new album will not have the same kind of feel to the previous albums. The band said that there is not a specific sound that is influencing the band. They said they like to into the studio and pick a beat and they build up the track from that moment on. They went on to say they've not thought about influencing on other artists songs as they want them to be all original. Mollie King said that the band get into twos or threes to write lyrics, she said although the band spend a lot of time together they also still have their five separate lives and yet they have so much to talk about, which means they never run out on lyrics as there are "so many dramas" going on around them, as she said "we're five girls after all". While in an interview with Sugarscape the band confirmed that they want the whole album to be "fresh" and have a completely different sound from their previous albums, so it does not sound like the band are releasing the same type of music. They also said that the music would be "current" meaning they will release music which the public are interested in at the moment. However, they did say there would be some type of their "original sound" on the album as they want to "make everyone welcome" on the album.

"Dance music is massive at the moment so it's a dance track [Notorious], but it also has something unique behind it. It's got this drop-out chorus where it's just the beat and you can only hear our voices – there aren't many tracks like that, so it's a bit different."

— Una Healy

It was confirmed that the band been recording at Dean Street Studios, London. and Tracklacers studios in Kent. The sound of the album will have a more edgier and dancing sound from the band. However, the band said that whey will still have their pop edge, but "this time around" they have taken the album through a bit of a more dancey route. They also went on to say that they want their music to reflect on their live shows, saying they want their concerts to be like "one big giant party" making the show and their music fun for everyone. They late said that the best night you could have out was at their December tour due to their music being "bigger and better" than before. According to Mollie King on the band's official website the band's influences are coming from Britney Spears' dance-pop style, Adele and John Mayer's pop rock style, where taking a dancier style to Rihanna and Katy Perry's style. The band stated their newest music is "definitely more clubbier" than their previous material. They said that the lyrics has a "lot of man-bashing" singing about how girls are better than boys, then calling themselves feisty on the album. They went on to say that the album sound is not a "typical girlband sound", they also said "the great thing about pop music you get to try lots of different music". The band said that the album tracks which they have recorded so far [June 2011] sounds great and different. They are writing a lot at the moment as they want the album to be bigger and better. "All Fired Up" track was labelled as the band as a "floor filler" "All Fired Up" was explained as think "Ibiza closing party meets Miami poolside rave – the girls continue to blow us away as their signature pop vocals are played over a synth dance beat creating this anthemic dance banger." It was revealed by the band that Travie McCoy would feature a guest rap on the album.

== Music and lyrics ==
"This album is particulary [sic] special for me and the girls. It's really personal because we've wrriten half of the album ourselves, and our experiences so we relate to the new album a lot, which we really love.

— Mollie King

The album lead single with the track "Notorious" and the track has been compared to artists Rihanna, The Black Eyed Peas and Kelis, featuring a "drop-out chorus" where it's just the beat and you can only hear our voices – there aren't many tracks like that, so it's a bit different." The second single from the album "All Fired Up" is a dance-pop song and has gathered comparisons to artists Lady Gaga and David Guetta. The Saturdays revealed that they recorded a dance track due to the dance music being "huge at the moment". The band explained "All Fired Up" by saying, "Ibiza closing party meets Miami poolside rave – the girls continue to blow us away as their signature pop vocals are played over a synth dance beat creating this anthemic dance banger." Critics also wrote, "Vanessa [White] demands in a hazy and heavily synthesised fashion on the intro of 'All Fired Up'." "Their fun, girlish vibe and unabashed pop sensibility has been traded for a cookie-cutter electro-pop sound." The album has got more dance tracks on like singles "Notorious" and "All Fired Up" but the band did stress that the whole album is not like that. They went on to say that they've got some classic "The Saturdays's tracks" on the album, and the album will feature a few ballads which the band intended to welcome everyone on the album.

According to the band, the lyrics that they have written have taken big inspiration from the relationships they are in and their past relationships. Una Healy said "I dig into the past for inspiration and remember all the bad boyfriends I had and all the crap things they did to me." Emeli Sandé said that she wrote a track for the band which was very dark and a strong ballad. She said that the lyrics are dark and very honest. The band admitted that they had focused on a particular sound after some of their favourite artists released that type of music. Rochelle Humes said that "Someone Like You" by Adele and "She Makes Me Wanna" by JLS and Dev was a big influence in what they wanted their records to sound like. They later confessed that they wished they recorded "Lick Ya Down" by Cover Drive. The band revealed that there are lot of tearjerkers on the album. Madonna was a big inspiration for the album. Jay-Z had a lot of inspiration for the album also.

The Saturdays "Notorious"
The Saturdays dance/R&B song.

This All Fired Up is definitely the dancingist song we've ever made and it's the danciest track on the album too but there are lots of different styles on the album. We understand that dance music is very big at the moment and when you're a pop act you can venture into differ rent genres. We've done al sorts in the past, Forever Is Over was pop-rock almost and there are lots of ballads on the new album too.

Recording "The Way You Watch Me" the band heard the track which Travie McCoy sent to them. The band said as soon as they heard the song they fell in love with it, describing the song as "flirty", "fun" and "playful". Mollie King said the song is a "roadtrip" song which people would like to listen to it in a car. Although the band recorded the collaboration with McCoy the band didn't actually meet him. The lyrics of "Faster" have been labelled as "romantic" by the band but with and Uptempo dance beat track. It is a dance with a pop edge. "For Myself" is a track the band co-wrote with Viktoria Hansen, the song is about a turbulent relationship and no matter what you argue a lot. The band said that "White Lies" linked them back to their first studio album, Chasing Lights (2008). "Wish I Didn't Know" is a pop ballad The background of the song is about your ex, who you still love being with someone else. "My Heart Takes Over" is a "sad song" according to the band. They said that the song pulls on your heart strings. "Get Ready, Get Set" was defined by the band as a "feel good uptempo song" The band wrote the song, they said when they were writing the lyrics they were trying to be "steamy" which was "embarrassing" for them. "Do What You Want With Me" was written by Jaz Rogers and Bryn Christopher. Vanessa White said when she first recorded the song "she wasn't feeling it". The song has a lot of different elements and took a long time to get it right. The song also is a Dubstep song and the band said it was the "coolest" song on the album. "Last Call" is Frankie Sandford's favourite song on the album, she explained the song as a "heart melt ballad". The song was written by Charlie Holmes and Lucie Silvas. The song is about love and the band said the lyrics hit you straight away. And the song is the most personal song to everyone, the band and the songwriters. "Move on U" was written by the band themselves and they wanted the lyrics to be "Sexy" and "Flirtatious". They also said that the song is a "little rude". "Move on U" is also an uptempo track and according but it has the sing-along element to it. "Promise Me" is about a boys who promises stuff, but do not stick to their promises. They defined the song as "very party". "I Say Ok" is a Tongue-in-cheek song. The lyrics of the song are quite basic so everyone knows what the song is about. They said the song is the most pop song on the album.

== Marketing and promotion ==
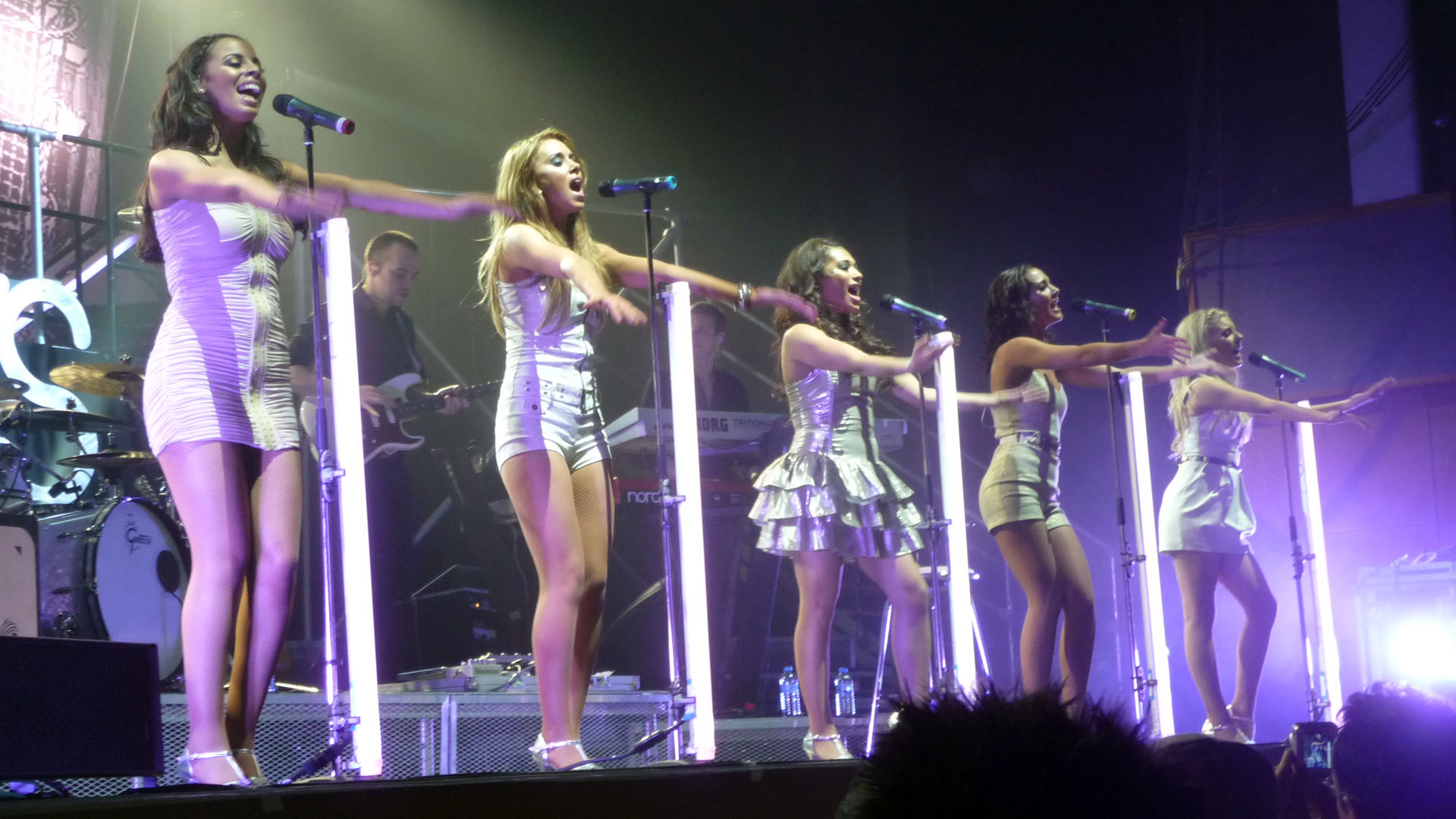
The Saturdays performed at several festivals over the summer of 2011.

Upon the release of the lead single from the album, the band began to promote their single by teasing fans with "lyric teasers" revealing a lyric from the song everyday until it was released, they also began to release snipped clips of the music video for the single to large fans. They began to post comments on Twitter posting, "Who's Notorious?" or using "#imnotorious" The band appeared on reality TV show, So You Think You Can Dance: The Results Show, where the band performed their new single to help boost the awareness of the new single and upcoming album. The group also released a clothing line with high street store Miss Selfridge, with the t-shirts featuring lyrics from "Notorious" and the group's previously released single "Higher", with the t-shirts being designed by the group themselves. It was confirmed that the band would in fact perform at the Enjoy Summer Festival 2011 in Wales. Via the band's official website, they started a competition "Reveal Your Notorious Side!" which fans would enter the competition by telling the band about your most notorious moments. Asking if you're friends classed you as the cheeky-one, the feisty one or the naughty one. The winner of the competition would get the chance to meet the band and "win some fantastic prizes". The band flew to Norway and Germany to promote their upcoming single and album. Upon the release of "Notorious" the band's reality TV show, The Saturdays: What Goes on Tour aired in late May 2011 showing behind the scenes. Una Healy said they wanted their fans to see how it is on tour and what their friendship is like in the band and how they never have argument and they have good banter. The Saturdays also appeared on Great British Hairdresser on Channel 4.

The Saturdays began to promote their album by appearing on talks shows including The Graham Norton Show talking about their album, singles and tour. They also featured a performance on Lorraine, to promote their single "Notorious". They appeared on morning talk and news show, Daybreak, where the band spoke about their upcoming tour and album. They performed "Notorious" on T4 and Friday Download. The Saturdays also confirmed that they would be appearing at a number of Summer Festivals. They first appeared at theme park, Alton Towers at the Alton Towers Live Concerts, where they performed a number of their hits. Due to the band releasing their single, "Notorious" they appeared at the Live Lounge performing a cover of Aloe Blacc's hit single "I Need a Dollar". They were confirmed to be appearing at T4 on the Beach for their third time. As well as appearing at Towneley Festival. During their promotional tour, the band appeared at Glamour Awards where the band won Band of the Year. It was also confirmed by the band that they would, in fact, be performing at the V Festival. They also confirmed themselves to be performing at T in the Park It was later announced that the band would become ambassadors for Nintendo 3DS game, Nintendogs + Cats, which the band recorded a number of TV adverts to promote. It was confirmed by Una Healy herself that she was pregnant with her first child to rugby star, Ben Foden.

== Release ==
On Your Radar was released on 18 November 2011 in Australia and Ireland, while being released on 21 November 2011 in Germany and the United Kingdom.

=== Singles ===
The album's lead single was confirmed to be "Notorious". The track was produced by Steve Mac and written by himself and Ina Wroldsen whom the pair have previously work together on a number of singles for the band including "Ego". The single premiered on Chris Moyles's breakfast show on 20 May 2011 on BBC Radio 1. The song has been described as "big" and that it was "quite amazing" and often getting comparison to music by The Black Eyed Peas, Kelis and Rihanna. Music Entertainment said, The Saturdays are back and they are bringing a tougher, edgier sound." The band flew out to Los Angeles to film the music video for "Notorious" According to the band, they took the music video influences outline from TV series, Ugly Betty. The single was officially released on 22 May 2011, a week later it entered the UK Singles Charts at number-eight, becoming the band's ninth top ten hit on the UK Singles Chart. It also entered the Irish Singles Charts at number nineteen. The official remix of the song was revealed to feature guest vocals from Chipmunk.

"All Fired Up" was confirmed to be the second single from the album after the band announced their first arena tour. The single was released on 4 September 2011. Although the song sold more copies in its first three days of release than any of their previous singles, it only managed to chart at number three on the UK Singles Chart. A third single was confirmed to be released before the album and would be a ballad. It was confirmed on 28 September 2011, that "My Heart Takes Over" would be the third single released from the album. It received its first radio airplay on 29 September 2011 on The Chris Moyles Show, and a video was shot in Iceland. Capital FM reported that "The Way You Watch Me" was being lined up as a fourth single, however the group moved on to a new album era with the release of a brand new song "30 Days" in May 2012, which would precede their fourth album Living for the Weekend (2013).

=== Tour ===
While performing on their Headlines Tour in early 2011, The Saturdays confirmed that they would in fact be touring again later in the year. The band revealed the tour dates for December 2011 in June 2011 via the band's official website and originally consisted of eleven shows across the UK. It was later announced that the tour was to travel to Belfast and Dublin taking the total number of dates to thirteen. They said "It's an arena tour so we're forced to go all out for a big production." Mollie King said that fans should expect a lot of bright colours and brightly coloured blocks for the production. Una Healy said about the tour; "Well the tour is not until December but we've been busy auditioning dancers and we're planning to discuss choreography in the next few weeks. We're really busy with the album at the moment and that's due out in November so it's a busy time and we're just trying to fit it all in."

== Reception ==
=== Critical response ===
Professional ratings
Review scores
Source	Rating
4Music	(4/5)
AllMusic	2.5/5 stars
BBC Music	(mixed)
Cosmopolitan	(positive)
Daily Express	(2/5)
Digital Spy	3/5 stars
The Independent	1/5 stars
The Observer	2/5 stars
Virgin Media	3/5 stars

On Your Radar has garnered mixed reviews, with many reviewers criticising its lack of identity and individuality. AllMusic's Jon O'Brien wrote that the album "is make-or-break time", while noticing that the girls' "robotic vocals are occasionally capable of emotion." Hermione Hoby of The Observer found the Saturdays "perennially short on tunes and heavy on lipgloss" and stated that "they've professed to heading in a "clubbier" direction, which sadly means lots of boring bangers that are more filler than floor-filling." Simon Gage of the Daily Express wrote that "there is not an original thought or sound on this collection", but noted that "whatever The Saturdays' real input into this new album, it doesn't seem to have damaged the brand too much." Stephen Moore of the Islington Gazette wrote that "half the album is thrill-free filler and dodgy attempts at heartfelt slowies, but the rest is passably poppy at least." Matthew Horton of Virgin Media called it "unremarkable" and noticed that "the major issue is an off-the-peg production sheen that lumps On Your Radar with any old pop-rave album on the market right now." However, he praised the songs produced by Xenomania and Steve Mac and labelled the song "Do What You Want With Me" as "the big standout [...], which peaks, dips and soars through glacial chords and shows a bit of endeavour."

Lewis Corner of Digital Spy complimented "the girls' newfound enthusiasm for slipping on a pair of Louboutins and hitting the dancefloor" while praising the singles "Notorious" and "All Fired Up", but felt that "their initial energy soon starts to wane at the back-end" and concluded by saying that "the result is a jumble sale of hits and misses which, unfortunately, sees the girls' identity slip steadily off the radar." Mike Diver of BBC Music called the album "as much of a nuisance as a neighbour's car alarm blaring away at 3 am" and described it as "an unforgiving listen which aims to attract the nightclubbing crowd at the expense of its central performers' more appealing comfort zones." However, he highlighted the ballads "Wish I Didn't Know" and "Last Call" as the standout tracks. Andy Gill from The Independent described On Your Radar as "an album that seeks not to separate itself from the herd, but to bury itself so deeply in its midst as to be virtually invisible" and felt that "the rote expressions of devotion, (frankly risible) and regret are organised into a vacillating cycle of submission and reproach that offers scant opportunities for imaginative connection."

A more favourable review came from Sarah Kwong from Cosmopolitan who noted that "the girl group have taken their feisty, finger-snapping lyrics and given them harder, cooler beats" and David Griffiths of 4Music who noticed that "The Saturdays continue to go from strength to strength" and praised the "hooky chorus and slamming beats" of the song "White Lies", which he described as "the best of the bunch". The reviewer from Newsround praised the album's abundance of "stomping electro anthems [...] to wave your arms/sing along/shake your body to" and felt that it "certainly doesn't disappoint".

=== Commercial performance ===
On Your Radar debuted at number forty-three in the Irish Albums Chart, a major drop from their previous release, Headlines!, which reached number ten. While all previous albums peaked within the Top 10 in the United Kingdom, On Your Radar charted at number 23 with sales of 18,044 units.

== Track listing ==
No.	Title	Writer(s)	Producer(s)	Length
1.	"All Fired Up"	Brian Higgins; Timothy "The Dealer" Deal; Matthew Gray; Nicholas Dresti; Uzoechi Emenike; Annie Yuill; Miranda Cooper; Eliza Dodd-Noble; Jason Resch	Xenomania	3:13
2.	"Notorious"	Ina Wroldsen; Steve Mac	Mac	3:12
3.	"Faster"	Wroldsen; Mac	Mac	3:54
4.	"My Heart Takes Over"	Wroldsen; Mac	Mac	4:06
5.	"Get Ready, Get Set"	Una Healy; Mollie King; Frankie Sandford; Rochelle Humes; Vanessa White; Higgins; Cooper; Dresti; MNEK; Tim Deal; Gray	Xenomania	3:28
6.	"The Way You Watch Me" (featuring Travie McCoy)	Tanya Lacey; Lucas Secon; Carsten Mortensen	Lucas Secon	3:29
7.	"For Myself"	Healy; King; Sandford; Humes; White; David Eriksen; Viktoria Hansen; Thomas Eriksen	David Eriksen	3:24
8.	"Do What You Want with Me"	Jarrad Rogers; Bryn Christopher	Rogers	3:37
9.	"Promise Me"	Healy; King; Sandford; Humes; White; Steve Daly; Jon Keep; Ali Tennant	Tracklacers	3:22
10.	"Wish I Didn't Know"	Healy; King; Sandford; Humes; White; Daly; Keep; Tennant	Charlie Holmes	3:42
11.	"White Lies"	Wroldsen; Carl Falk; Rami Yacoub	Falk; Yacoub	4:02
12.	"Last Call"	Healy; Holmes; Lucie Silvas	Holmes	3:57
13.	"I Say OK"	Healy; King; Sandford; Humes; White; David Eriksen; Nina Woodford	David Eriksen	3:47
14.	"Move on U"	Healy; King; Sandford; Humes; White; The Alias	The Alias	3:24

Digital edition
No.	Title	Length
4.	"My Heart Takes Over" (Radio edit)	3:44

iTunes Store bonus content
No.	Title	Length
4.	"My Heart Takes Over" (Radio edit)	3:44
15.	"On Your Radar – The Making of the Album" (Video)
16.	"Notorious" (Music video)	3:12
17.	"All Fired Up" (Music video)	3:13
18.	"My Heart Takes Over" (Music video)	3:44

- Note: Tracks 13 and 14 are labelled as United Kingdom bonus tracks on the physical release, but are on all editions worldwide.

== Credits ==
On Your Radar was recorded from August 2010 until September 2011, and released under the record license to Fascination Records a sub-label of Polydor Records.

=== Personnel ===
- Mollie King- Vocals
- Una Healy- Vocals
- Frankie Sandford- Vocals
- Vanessa White- Vocals
- Rochelle Humes- Vocals
- Fredrik Anderson – rhythm arrangement, keyboards, programming
- Dick Beetham – mastering
- Louis Biancaniello – producer, audio mixing, keyboards, programming
- Arnthor Birgisson – producer, vocal arranger
- Barry Blue – guitar
- Griffin Boice – producer, audio mixing, programming
- James Bourne – guitar
- RaVaughn Brown – additional vocals
- Chippe Carlson – rhythm arrangement, keyboards, programming
- Richard Edgeler – assistant audio mixing
- Serban Gheana – audio mixing
- Choukri Gustmann – engineer
- John Hanes – engineer
- Lukas Hilbert – producer
- Charlie Holmes – producer, guitar, keyboards, bass, drums, percussion
- Ash Howes – audio mixing
- David Kreuger – producer, vocal arranger, rhythm arrangement, keyboards, programming
- Kevin Verchel – additional vocals, vocal arranger
- Paul Lamalfa – assistant recording engineer
- Chris Laws – engineer, Pro Tools, programming
- Steve Mac – producer, keyboard, vocal arranger, songwriter
- Per Magnusson – producer, vocal arranger, rhythm arrangement, keyboards, programming
- Esbjörn Öhrwall – guitars
- Daniel Pursey – engineer, drums, percussion
- James Reynolds – audio mixing, additional production, synths
- Tim Roberts – assistant engineer, assistant audio mixer
- Ben Robbins – recording
- Ben Roulston – engineer
- Finlay Dow-Smith (Starsmith) – additional producer, remixer
- Toby Scott – engineer
- Mintman – Bass, Guitars, Drums, Keyboards
- Matt Gray – engineer
- Sam Watters – producer, audio mixing
- Brio Taliaferro – additional producer, audio mixing
- Jeremy Wheatley – additional producer, audio mixing
- Ina Wroldsen – additional vocals, vocal arranger, songwriter
- Chris Young – vocal producer

=== Recording locations ===
Norway

- Eccentric Studios (Oslo)

Sweden

- Kinglet Studios (Stockholm)

United Kingdom

- Universal Studio (London)
- Rokstone Studios (London)
- Dean Street Studios (London)
- NTC Studios (London)
- Rockin' Horse Studios (London)
- Twenty One Studios (London)
- Big Sky (London)
- Cell 1 (London)
- Chestnut Studios (London)
- Wendyhouse Production (London)
- Mintman Studios
- Music Box
- Mux Music Studios
- Weyside Studios

United States

- Electracraft Studio (New York City)

== Charts and certifications ==
=== Charts ===
Chart (2011)	Peak position
Irish Albums Chart	43
Scottish Albums Chart	21
UK Albums Chart	23

=== Certifications ===
Country	Provider	Certification
United Kingdom	BPI	Silver

== Release history ==
Region	Date	Format	Label
Australia	18 November 2011	Digital download	Polydor
Ireland	18 November 2011	CD, digital download, limited deluxe edition	Polydor
United Kingdom	21 November 2011	CD, digital download, limited deluxe edition	Polydor
