= All Fired Up (The Saturdays song) =

2011 single by the Saturdays

Single by The Saturdays

from the album On Your Radar
- B-side: "Ladykiller"
- Released: 4 September 2011
- Recorded: 2011
- Studio: Abbey Road (London)
- Genre: Dance-pop; electropop; electroclash
- Length: 3:14
- Label: Polydor
- Songwriters: Tim Deal; Brian Higgins; Matt Gray; Annie Yuill; Nick Dresti; Miranda Cooper
- Producers: Xenomania; MNEK

The Saturdays singles chronology
| "Notorious" (2011) | "All Fired Up" (2011) | "My Heart Takes Over" (2011) |

Music video
- "All Fired Up" on YouTube

Professional ratings
Review scores
| Source | Rating |
|---|---|
| Digital Spy | 4/5 stars |

"All Fired Up" is a song by British-Irish girl group The Saturdays, released as the second single from their third studio album, On Your Radar (2011). The single was released on 4 September 2011 by Polydor Records. The song was written by Tim Deal, Brian Higgins, Matt Gray, Annie Yuill, Miranda Cooper, MNEK and Space Cowboy. The song was also produced by Xenomania, and was recorded at Xenomania. Described by critics as an "anthemic dance banger", the electropop song was inspired by the music of Rihanna and Britney Spears, and was noted for its "synth dance beat". The track received its first airplay on BBC Radio 1 on 22 July 2011, when Scott Mills aired it on his Ready for the Weekend. The remix EP was released with five different remixes.

"All Fired Up" received positive reviews from critics, with many commending the song's "girlish vibe and unabashed pop sensibility". The song was performed live on television for the first time on Tonight's the Night. Before the release of the single the music video for "All Fired Up" was released on 10 August 2011. The music video was originally due to be released on 9 August 2011 at 10:30 am on the band's official website; however due to technical issues it was uploaded a day late. According to the band, the music video is a lot more fashion-based and a lot more graphic-y as they said they wanted something different due to all their previous music videos having a storyline to them; this one is just a lot more fashion. Within the digital download EP the band released a cover of "I Need a Dollar" by Aloe Blacc.

"All Fired Up" received commercial success after it charted at number-six on the Irish Singles Chart, becoming the band's fifth top ten single in Ireland. The single also found success in the United Kingdom after it charted at number-three on the UK singles chart behind Maroon 5 and Christina Aguilera's "Moves like Jagger" and Pixie Lott's "All About Tonight". The single became the band's tenth top ten single in the UK of eleven singles released. The single also had identical chart success as the band's 2010 single "Missing You", charting at number three and six in the UK and Ireland simultaneously.

== Background and composition ==
"We can't wait! It's the most dancey track we've done so far, so it's really exciting for us. It's something really different. We can't wait."

—The Saturdays on "All Fired Up"

"All Fired Up" was written by Brian Higgins, Tim Deal, Matt Gray, Annie Yuill, MNEK and Miranda Cooper and was produced by Brian Higgins and Xenomania. The song was recorded in 2011 after the band said they wanted to try some music which was a lot more "sexier" and "definitely a different sound". The band revealed that a lot of the songs on the album (including "All Fired Up") are about love which the inspiration of the songs came from their celebrity boyfriends; David Gandy [Mollie King], Wayne Bridge [Frankie Sandford], Marvin Humes [Rochelle Wiseman], and Ben Foden [Una Healy]. However, Vanessa who is the only single one drew inspiration as she loved to party and the song is a very party song. However, the band did point that they were singing about how girls are better than boys, then calling themselves feisty on the album.

"All Fired Up"

"All Fired Up" is an electroclash and dance-pop track and the second single released from the band's upcoming third studio album. It was confirmed that Space Cowboy would be working on their newest album, however it was also confirmed that the band were working with Xenomania's Brian Higgins. The band confirmed that they wanted Space Cowboy to get involved in the album after he led Lady Gaga to huge success whom we worked with on tracks ("Just Dance" and "Poker Face"). The band wanted to work with MNEK after he produced a lot of Tinie Tempah's smash hits, and they are big fans of his music. When the band was asked to explain the single they said; "All Fired Up" was explained as think "Ibiza closing party meets Miami poolside rave – the girls continue to blow us away as their signature pop vocals are played over a synth dance beat creating this anthemic dance banger." The band labelled the track as their "floor filler". The song was speculated as the second single from the band's album, due to the band announcing the All Fired Up Tour a few months before they revealed the "All Fired Up" as the second single. The band shared their confidence with releasing the track due to them saying "Dance music is huge right now" however, they said they could on judge the reaction from Twitter and when the band have performed the song and the song has been requested a lot on the radio. The band confirmed that "All Fired Up" would be a "departure from dance music" as they said "It won't be any more dancey than "All Fired Up", that's as dancey as we'll get now. Our next single will be something along the lines of a ballad. There are a couple of ballads on the album." They went on to say if they made it any more dancey the song would be "too hardcore" The band revealed that Britney Spears and Rihanna's dance-pop style influenced the band to want to record a dance track. They said that the song is "definitely more clubbier" than their previous material. The band said releasing dance tracks is not means that they do not just have a "typical girl band sound", they also said "the great thing about pop music you get to try lots of different music". The track receive its first ever airplay on BBC Radio 1 on 22 July 2011, when Scott Mills airs it on his 'Ready for the Weekend' show between 6-7pm. In an interview, Una Healy said; "This is [All Fired Up] definitely the danciest song we've ever made and it's the danciest track on the album too but there are lots of different styles on the album. We understand that dance music is very big at the moment and when you're a pop act you can venture into different genres."

== Release ==
"All Fired Up" was confirmed to be the second single from the Saturdays' then-upcoming third studio album, in which it would feature. The band confirmed that the release of the song would be a departure from dance music from their album. The track was first revealed almost two months before its release after Scott Mills premiered the song on his BBC Radio 1 show Ready For the Weekend on 22 July 2011. The song was accepted onto all A lists at Radio stations and became one of the most requested songs to play. The digital download release was on 4 September 2011; if customers you pre-ordered the single you would get an exclusive track of the band performing "I Need a Dollar" by Aloe Blacc from the album, Good Things. The single was released with b-side "Ladykiller" which was written by the band members themselves [Mollie, Frankie, Vanessa, Una and Rochelle] and was co-produced by the Saturdays and the Alias. The karaoke version of "All Fired Up" was released in the digital download package. Upon the release there was a digital remixes EP which featured remixes of "All Fired Up" by a number of DJs; two from The Alias, Space Cowboy and Tom Staar which was made available from 2 September 2011. The CD single was made available to be from stores from 5 September 2011. On the CD single featured "All Fired Up", the b-side "Ladykiller" and a behind the scene footage from the music video of the single.

The band decided to release "All Fired Up" with radio airplay and the music video weeks before release, after they released "Notorious" without any radio airplay or the music video being released until two days before the actual release of the single. The decision of giving "All Fired Up" more airplay and promotion before the release came about after "Notorious" only charted at number-eight on the UK singles chart and number nineteen on the Irish Singles Chart. "All Fired Up" was speculated the second single from the band's third studio album after they announced that the tour would be titled All Fired Up Tour the band later confirmed that the single would be in fact "All Fired Up". It was later announced that the band would become ambassadors for Nintendo 3DS game, Nintendogs + Cats; which the band recorded a number of TV adverts to promote; and "All Fired Up" is played in the background of the advert.

== Critical reception ==
Digital Spy said: "Blow my mind, DJ, blow my mind," the Saturdays member Vanessa [White] demands in a hazy and heavily synthesised fashion on the intro of the new the Saturdays single. Opening with what feels as if we've caught her in the middle of a boozy night out, it not only makes a change from her usual ad-libbing duties, but marks a sizeable shift for a group whose image relied on being squeaky clean... until now, that is. We make the party super naughty," Rochelle [Wiseman] teases before strutting her stuff on the bar, while serial good-girl Mollie [King] unleashes her inner animal as she chants "getcha claws out" over a thumping Xenomania-helmed beat. Meanwhile, Frankie [Sandford] finds herself on "the edge of desire" in a quiet corner with her fella and Una [Healy] urges hers not to forget her anytime soon. Given the result is handbag house-pop at its very best, we can't see that being much of a problem." Overall, Digital Spy decided upon the reward the band a four out of 5 stars. Gigulate said; "Their fun, girlish vibe and unabashed pop sensibility has been traded for a cookie-cutter electro-pop sound."

UK Stand Up praised the song after they said not only is the song different music from what the band are normally creating, and they like to see them taking risks. They went on to say that not only will current fans love "All Fired Up" but will "open doors" to new fans for the band and new paths will be available to walk down for "new generation fans". They also said they were happy to see the band are taking new steps and moving away from the pop music. They finally said "This mature sound is very upbeat and guaranteed to have you on your feet within seconds".

Not all reviews were positive for "All Fired Up", Grant Howitt from FHM said; "It's about having a good old dance. Fair enough. It's a fine topic for a pop song, being as it is number three on a list of three possible pop topics ("I fancy you, which is a good thing" and "You don't fancy me, which is a bad thing" are the other two), and we can imagine having a good old boogie to it ourselves. After a few, obviously, it's not something we'd go into sober." However, Cool FM said the girls continue to blow them away as their signature pop vocals are played over a synth dance beat creating this anthemic dance banger. OK! Magazine said they loved "All Fired Up" and that ever since they first heard the track, they could not get the song out of their heads.

== Commercial reception ==
" It's pretty close and we'd love to get that number one but I've got a feeling Pixie Lott might get it. She's our biggest rival but she's also a friend. She's here tonight so I'm sure we'll wish her luck over a glass of bubbly"

—The Saturdays talk about the pre-chart nerves

When asked about the single, the band said, "Well "Notorious" did fantastically well and we'd be delighted to get into the top ten again. "All Fired Up" has had fantastic feedback from the fans on Facebook and Twitter so we're confident but at the same time we'd never say that if it doesn't get to number one then it's not a hit because we have lots of songs that's people love that didn't get to the top." According to the midweek charts at the time, Lott was due to debut at number one on Sunday with "All About Tonight", however; it was then said that the Saturdays could take over as they are only 1,000 copies behind Lott. It was later announced that Lott was up 1,200 more than the band. Upon its release, the single entered the Irish Singles Charts at number-six becoming the band's fifth top ten hit in Ireland. However, it was upon the announcement that Lott has topped the chart it was confirmed "All Fired Up" had debuted at number-three on the official charts; behind Maroon 5 and Christina Aguilera's "Moves like Jagger" who remained at number-two and Pixie Lott at number one.

== Music video ==
=== Background and release ===
The Saturdays in the music video for "All Fired Up"

The video for the single was shot on 28 July 2011. The video was set to premiere on 9 August 2011 at 10:30am. An official teaser clip was released prior to the premiere. On the band's official site, there was a countdown clock, counting down to the premiere. However, due to technical issues, the premiere was initially set postponed until 11:00am and later until 11:30am. Eventually it was confirmed on the group's official Facebook page that the video premiere would take place on 10 August 2011 instead. The band said; We wanted this one [music video] to be kinda graphic-y and more fashion-based, which I think it is. It's different for us, because it hasn't got a storyline, which a lot of our videos have done. Like, "Ego" we were super heroes, "Notorious" we were secretaries. It's more...perhaps cooler, this one. It's just different for us.

=== Synopsis and plot ===
During the opening scene of "All Fired Up" music video is puddles of water with a reflection of lights on them, as the clip changes it shows Vanessa White standing with one hand on her hip singing "Blow my mind, DJ blow my mind, come on" then Frankie Sandford and Mollie King appear from behind White, and later a view from above them you see Rochelle Wiseman and Una Healy. As the song begins to kick in, the band start to do a simple dance routine wearing black leather dresses and shoes, with a veil attached. As the chorus begins the band members are seen at different scenes, in a different room by themselves singing the chorus. There are also scenes where women in black body catsuits (with just their hair out of the suits) are dancing in the puddles of water. Throughout the video the band are seen wearing fashionable outfits, in the middle of the chorus; all the band members are seen standing in a circle wearing neutral colour dresses posing, not moving, where the platform they are standing on is turning. They are often seen whipping their hair at "blow my mind" as a symbol of them getting their minds/heads blow off. As the video is beginning to follow out the girls are seen crouching down with their fists up doing a simple dance. As Healy's last part of the video/song she is singing "keep me on your radar" and the girls have their hands to their head as if they are looking for someone. As its ending it shows all the images of the members posing at different points.

=== Reception ===
OK! Magazine said: Well now the Saturdays' brand new video for "All Fired Up" has landed on our desks and we're finding it hard to continue the rest of our day after experiencing horrid flashbacks of the girls looking fitter than we'll ever be. The magazine went on to say that plus the band are looking ever so glamorous for what appears to be just flooding an empty (and very posh) parking lot. They went on to says that "the girls wow in a series of ensembles and seem switch from black and white silver to gold outfits just by flipping their hair."

== Live performances and promotion ==
The Saturdays debuted the track first at the Audley End Picnic Concert and on Tonight's the Night for the song's first televised performance. They then performed the track at V Festival. They also performed the song at a number of other festivals which they appeared in around the country. To help promote the single, they appeared on This Morning where they sang the song live. Due to the group's third headlining tour being titled All Fired Up Tour, "All Fired Up" appeared in the setlist for the tour. The Saturdays performed live on Something for the Weekend on BBC2. The group went to discuss the song live on air on The Vodafone Big Top 40, and they were also available to chat on Capital Breakfast on 5 September 2011.

== Formats and track listings ==
CD single

1. "All Fired Up" – 3:15
2. "All Fired Up" (music video) – 3:23
3. "All Fired Up" (behind the scenes video)

Maxi-single

1. "All Fired Up" (extended mix) – 6:05
2. "Ladykiller" – 3:22
3. "All Fired Up" (The Alias club mix) – 6:06
4. "All Fired Up" (Tom Staar club mix) – 6:07

Vinyl

1. "All Fired Up" (The Alias radio edit) – 2:54
2. "All Fired Up" (Space Cowboy remix) – 4:59

Digital UK single

1. "All Fired Up" – 3:14
2. "All Fired Up" (karaoke version) – 3:12
3. "Ladykiller" – 3:20
4. "I Need a Dollar / Buzzin'" (iTunes pre-order only)

Digital remix EP

1. "All Fired Up" (extended mix) – 6:05
2. "All Fired Up" (Alias radio edit) – 2:53
3. "All Fired Up" (Space Cowboy remix) – 4:59
4. "All Fired Up" (Tom Staar club mix) – 6:07
5. "All Fired Up" (The Alias club mix) – 6:06

Revamped version

1. "All Fired Up" – 3:14
2. "Ladykiller" – 3:20
3. "I Need a Dollar" (Radio 1 Live Lounge) – 3:28
4. "All Fired Up" (extended mix) – 6:05
5. "All Fired Up" (The Alias radio edit) – 2:53
6. "All Fired Up" (Space Cowboy remix) – 4:59
7. "All Fired Up" (Cutmore Killa radio edit) – 3:30
8. "All Fired Up" (The Alias club mix) – 6:06
9. "All Fired Up" (Tom Staar club mix) – 6:07
10. "All Fired Up" (karaoke version) – 3:12

== Credits and personnel ==
"All Fired Up" was recorded at Abbey Road Studios, London.

- Brian Higgins – vocals recorder, producer, writer
- Miranda Cooper – writer
- Space Cowboy – writer, producer
- The Saturdays – vocals
- Kevin Verchel – additional vocals
- Uzoechi "MNEK" Emenike – writer
- Annie Yuill – writer, programming
- Matt Gray – recorder, writer
- Tim Deal – programming, writer

== Charts ==
=== Weekly charts ===
Weekly chart performance for "All Fired Up"
| Chart (2011) | Peak position |
|---|---|
| Euro Digital Song Sales (Billboard) | 4 |
| Ireland (IRMA) | 6 |
| Scotland Singles (OCC) | 3 |
| UK Singles (OCC) | 3 |

=== Year-end charts ===
Year-end chart performance for "All Fired Up"
| Chart (2011) | Position |
|---|---|
| UK Singles (OCC) | 115 |

== Certifications ==
Certifications for "All Fired Up"
| Region | Certification | Certified units/sales |
|---|---|---|
| United Kingdom (BPI) | Gold | 400,000^{‡} |
^{‡} Sales+streaming figures based on certification alone.

== Release and radio history ==
List of release dates, record label and format details
| Country | Date | Format | Label |
|---|---|---|---|
| United Kingdom | 22 July 2011 | Radio airplay | Polydor Records |
| Ireland | 4 September 2011 | Digital download | Polydor Records |
| United Kingdom | 4 September 2011 | Digital download | Polydor Records |
| United Kingdom | 5 September 2011 | CD single; CD maxi | Polydor Records |

== See also ==
- List of UK top-ten singles in 2011
