= Notorious (The Saturdays song) =

2011 single by The Saturdays

Single by The Saturdays

from the album On Your Radar
- B-side: "Not That Kinda Girl"
- Released: 20 May 2011
- Recorded: 2010–11
- Genre: Dance-pop
- Length: 3:11
- Label: Polydor
- Songwriters: Ina Wroldsen; Steve Mac
- Producer: Steve Mac

The Saturdays singles chronology
"Higher" (2010)	"Notorious" (2011)	"All Fired Up" (2011)

Music video
- "Notorious" on YouTube

Professional ratings
Review scores
Source	Rating
Digital Spy	4/5 stars

"Notorious" is a song by British-Irish girl group The Saturdays, released as the lead single from their third studio album, On Your Radar. The song was written by Ina Wroldsen and Steve Mac, who also produced the song. The single was released digitally on 22 May 2011. "Notorious" was recorded in 2011 after the band were looking for a new sound to release in their third album. According to the lyrics in the song the band are loving life, they like to go out and enjoy themselves however they work hard and they all have a bad and naughty side to them. The lyrics of the song has been described as "playful". Vanessa White said the song was a more "grown up" approach to the music they have released before. The group performed the song live for the first time on So You Think You Can Dance and the song received its first radio airplay on The Chris Moyles Show.

"Notorious" received mainly positive reviews from critics. It gained comparisons to the Black Eyed Peas, Rihanna and Kelis. Some critics labelled the song as "quite amazing" and "big" and "a bit Black Eyed Peas-esque". It song was also praised for the big production of the song. Aled Jones described the song as "unexpected" from the group. It has also been said that the all-girl group are bringing a tougher, edgier sound. Yahoo! Music questioned the song if it was enough, stating; "a bad girl", short skirts, nice hair, rave breakdown - but is it enough?".

The single's release was accompanied by a music video, which was filmed in Los Angeles; and the final version of the video premiered on both the band's official website and ITV2 at 8:30am on 19 May 2011. The music video has been described as "sexy secretary look as they knuckle down to a day's work at the office" and "The lift handily opens out into a dance floor where they strut their stuff in front of some appreciative men." However; the music video has been compared to Boots pharmacy advert but "with a better song". In the music video, the band had number of different clothing changing where they went for the secretary look and then later changed into stylish clothes for the clubbing scene. They also released 20 second teasers of the video until the full video was broadcast. Also, before the release of the song, each member released "lyric teasers" where they would release lyrics of the song each day.

== Background and composition ==
"Notorious" is a dance-pop and R&B song. In late 2010; after the release of their previous single, "Higher" the band originally announced that they would be heading back into the recording studio in 2011 in order to record their third studio album. In March 2011, the song's producer Steve Mac confirmed that he had finished the single and it was almost ready for release. He revealed that the single was "different" from their past hit singles, despite being written and produced by the same song-writers. "Notorious" was released as the lead single from their third studio album, after they announced Headlines! would only be an extended play and according to their record label, the CD would "act as a bridge" between last studio album Wordshaker (2009) and their upcoming third full one in 2011.

"Notorious"

Mollie King stated that the song is about when you step on the dance floor you turn into a completely different person, which you turn into a bad girl. Una spoke; "Dance music is massive at the moment so it's a dance track, but it also has something unique behind it. It's got this drop-out chorus where it's just the beat and you can only hear our voices - there aren't many tracks like that, so it's a bit different." The band were asked by Wonderland what they were 'Notorious' for and they replied with "We are notorious for making good music, hopefully." Where Una said she wanted to make live shows notorious.

The band began to tease fans with details for the single. The first teasers were released week beginning 2 May 2011, where the girls released "lyric teasers" each day the band would release an image of one of the members holding a piece of paper with some lyrics on. The following week, behind the scenes images of the music video were released. The band officially announced their single on their official website stating the song would be released on 22 May 2011. Vanessa White told Heat World that "Notorious" was more grown up to what the band had already released which their whole album would be more "grown up". She also stated that the music is a lot sexier and more exciting than it used to be. She stated; "Our new album's going to be a lot sexier than our old one, it's definitely a different sound, we're really excited about it, We've all grown up a bit now and that shows. It's also a lot more R&B than anything we've done before, it's a very cool. Every time I think about the new single Notorious it makes me want to dance."

Speaking to the band; they confirmed that "Notorious" will be released all around Europe. Although the band confirmed that the single will not be released on physically until 27 June; they will not be doing as much promotion until the single is released on CD single.

== Reception ==
=== Critical reception ===
"Notorious" received mostly positive reviews from critics. Many blogs were praising the song. PopJustice said the song was "big" and that it was "quite amazing". It's a bit Black Eyed Peas-esque, feels a tiny bit like Kelis and Rihanna, and has a strong, propulsive energy that builds throughout the tune". Digital Spy stated; "I'm a big boss, I'm a gangster, On the dance floor" Mollie King announces on the squeaky, Auto-Tuned intro, before dropping a high-wired, club-pumping beat the Black Eyed Peas would cock a snook at. "I'm a bad girl, I'm notorious" insists Rochelle Wiseman, while a storm of synths, strings and techno beeps brews behind them. The result isn't quite as instant as the lyrics would suggest, but there's no doubting they talk a good game. Giving the song a four out of five stars. Music Entertainment said, "The Saturdays are back and they are bringing a tougher, edgier sound." Radio presenter Aled Jones took to Twitter and tweeted, "Just heard the new songs from The Saturdays and Black Eyed Peas :) didn't expect The Saturdays song to sound like it did!"

Yahoo! Music stated The Saturdays are pulling out all the big guns - talk of being "a bad girl", short skirts, nice hair, rave breakdown - but is it enough? The five-piece will truly be notorious if they don't take the crown when their rivals have been on the canvas for so long. Heat World said the band turn "transform" into sexy secretaries into sexy clubbers and they're nearly giving Britney [Spears] a run for her money.

=== Chart performance ===
"Notorious" was released without any promotion; it was released exclusive for digital downloads and the single found itself charting on the Irish Singles Charts, where it debuted at number nineteen becoming the band's eighth top 20 single in Ireland. On 29 May 2011, "Notorious" entered the UK top 10 on the UK Singles Charts at number eight, becoming the band's ninth top 10 hit there with only ten singles (to-date) released. The single spent but one week within the top 10, falling 13 places to number 21 on its second week; the biggest faller in the top 40 for the chart week ending 6 June. The single also charted on the Scottish Singles Chart where it charted at number-eight as well. The single also made an appearance on the UK Download Chart; which also charted at number-eight. The single appeared on South Korean music chart 'Gaon' charting at 164, despite the single not being released in Asia.

== Music video ==
=== Background and release ===
The girls confirmed they shot the video in April 2011 in Los Angeles; where the band's previous music video for "Higher" was filmed. The Saturdays confirmed that their music video for "Notorious" will be released on their website on 19 May at 8.30am. Before the release of the music video, the band released 20 seconds clips of each members part in the music video. The music video was directed by "Syndrome". The music video was officially released on 19 May 2011. According to the band, they took the music video outline from TV series, Ugly Betty.

=== Synopsis ===
The music video begins with the Dutch city hall called 'the Ice palace'. It is situated in the centre of The Hague. The rest is a set, not the interior of the Ice palace. The scene changes to an elevator, where the band are standing inside of it with the "Notorious" playing in the background, before the actual intro to the song begins. It then changes shots to the band standing in a lift wearing smart, secretary-type clothing, in a theme of red, white and black. Rochelle then presses the button 5 to take them to the 5th floor. As the elevator doors close the music starts; and Mollie starts singing the intro (the first of any Saturdays' singles to possess one) while the other members of the band behind her begin to brush themselves down before they go into the office. The scene is shot in a stop-motion retrospect. They then move into a large, white office, which is suggested to be their place of employment. The office is furnished in decadent colors, perhaps based on the offices of Mode Magazine, as the band, themselves, cited Ugly Betty as a reference for the video treatment. There, they sit at desks and immediately begin work, with the members revealing their boredom with the remedial work of stamping pieces of coloured paper with the words 'Notorious' and 'The Saturdays'. It appears Vanessa and Rochelle are the telephone carers - they sing their verses into the receivers - while Una remains fixed to a laptop for the duration. Rochelle begins the opening verse, followed by Vanessa, whose shots are stuttered to fit the beat. They then leave their desks and get back into the elevator then in time for the bridge/chorus. Rochelle presses the button 15 to take them to the 15th floor. Whilst going up in the elevator the band begin to primp, letting hair come down and clothes come off, and get changed into designer wear and proceed to apply Barry M' lip-gloss and mascara. At the beginning of the second verse, the elevator opens and Una proceeds with her verse, while shots reveal that the girls have arrived at a crowded nightclub. Following a dramatic strut, the girls join the dance floor, and usher on the second bridge. The camera zooms in on the DJ spinning a vinyl record of "Notorious". The club features break dancers and champagne, as well as LED lights, white chaises and modern art spreads. The video shows the five girls dancing at the front of their fellow club-goers, with an emphasis on each girl for the second bridge and chorus, and Frankie Sandford during her middle-eight. Through the ending of the song, where the chorus is in a continuous pitch-medley and joined - the first time - by the beat, the band dances in a hectic fashion, and the screen is often split into different angles, creating a sense of energy. The focus is switched, primarily, to Mollie King as the beat drops again once more, as she brings the chorus to a close with a reiteration of her opening intro. The screen then closes with the word Notorious on screen - the first of any of the band's videos to do this.

=== Reception ===
The Saturdays go for a sexy secretary look as they knuckle down to a day's work at the office. But they're soon letting their hair down and whipping out their lip gloss in a lift as they head out for a night on the town. The lift handily opens out into a dance floor where they strut their stuff in front of some appreciative men. They try to inject some sauce and attitude and warble about being 'gangsters' but really like the video shows they're just office girls pretending to be bad.

— Metro talking about The Saturdays' Notorious

PopDash stated the band teased us for the music video all week and seeing them partying in the club as well as they're secretaries scene waiting to clock off for the day; they stated it was a bit like the Boots advert but with a better song on it.

== Promotion ==
The single was premiered on Chris Moyles's breakfast show on 20 May 2011 on BBC Radio 1. On Sunday 22 May 2011 the song was released for digital download in the UK, although it was released in Ireland 20 May 2011. The Saturdays took to the stage of So You Think You Can Dance Live Results Show, where they performed the song for the very first time. The Saturdays performed at Parc y Scarlets for the Enjoy Summer Festival 2011 in Wales. Including various gigs across the United Kingdom including the Alton Towers and the Portrush Ultimate Beach Party. The girls promoted the single on Radio 1 Live Lounge on 21 June, also covering a mash up of "I Need a Dollar" and "Buzzin'" by Aloe Blacc and Mann. They were also the special musical guest on The Graham Norton Show on 24 June. The Saturdays then took the stage and performed on T4 the following day.

== Formats and track listings ==
Digital single

(Release 22 May 2011)

1. "Notorious" - 3:11
2. "Notorious" (Karaoke Version) - 3:15
3. "Higher" (Live from the Headlines! Tour) (iTunes Pre-order only) - 5:07

CD single

(Release 20 June 2011)

1. "Notorious" - 3:11
2. "Not That Kinda Girl" - 3:09

iTunes Remixes EP

(Release 19 June 2011)

1. "Notorious" (Chuckie Extended Remix) - 4:03
2. "Notorious" (Almighty Remix) - 6:10
3. "Notorious" (JRMX Club Mix) - 6:22
4. "Notorious" (Chuckie Remix Radio Edit) - 3:18
5. "Notorious" (Almighty Remix Radio Edit) - 3:31

iTunes Chipmunk Remix

(Release 26 June 2011)

1. "Notorious" (Chipmunk Remix) - 3:28

iTunes Single

(Release 26 June 2011)

1. "Notorious" (Jorg Schmid Radio Edit) - 3:26
2. "Not That Kinda Girl" - 3:09

Beatport Single

(Release 30 June 2011)

1. "Notorious" (Chuckie Dirty Dutch Club Mix) - 6:31
2. "Notorious" (Chuckie Dirty Dutch Dub) - 6:31

Revamped Version

(Release 20 May 2011)

1. "Notorious" - 3:11
2. "Not That Kinda Girl" - 3:09
3. "Notorious" (Chuckie Remix Radio Edit) - 3:18
4. "Notorious" (Jorg Schmid Radio Edit) - 3:26
5. "Notorious" (Almighty Remix Radio Edit) - 3:31
6. "Notorious" (JRMX Radio Edit) - 3:35
7. "Notorious" (feat. Chipmunk) [Chipmunk Remix] - 3:28
8. "Notorious" (Chuckie Extended Remix) - 4:03
9. "Notorious" (Almighty Remix) - 6:10
10. "Notorious" (JRMX Club Mix) - 6:22
11. "Notorious" (Karaoke Version) - 3:15

== Charts and certifications ==
=== Weekly charts ===
Chart (2011)	Peak position
Ireland (IRMA)	19
Romania (Romanian Top 100)	71
Scottish Singles Sales (Official Charts)	8
South Korea (GIC)	164
UK Singles (Official Charts)	8

=== Year-end charts ===
Year-end chart performance for "Notorious"
Chart (2011)	Position
UK Singles (OCC)	123

=== Certifications ===
Region	Certification	Certified units/sales
United Kingdom (BPI)	Silver	200,000^{‡}
^{‡} Sales+streaming figures based on certification alone.

== Personnel ==
"Notorious" was recorded at Dean Street Studios, London.

- Songwriters – Steve Mac, Ina Wroldsen
- producer – Steve Mac
- audio mixer – Ash Howes
- mastering engineer – Dick Beetham
- recording engineer – Ben Robbins
- vocal arrangement – Steve, Ina Wroldsen
- lead vocals – The Saturdays
- background vocals – Ina Wroldsen, Kevin Verchel

== Release history ==
List of release dates, record label and format details
Country	Date	Format	Label
Ireland	20 May 2011	Digital download	Polydor Records
United Kingdom	22 May 2011	Digital download	Fascination Records
Australia	22 May 2011	Digital download	Universal Music
Belgium	22 May 2011	Digital download	Universal Music
Denmark	22 May 2011	Digital download	Universal Music
Italy	22 May 2011	Digital download	Universal Music
Germany	31 May 2011	Digital download	Universal Music
