= The Lords of Salem (soundtrack) =

The Lords of Salem (Original Motion Picture Soundtrack)

Soundtrack album by John 5, Griffin Boice and various artists
- Released: April 16, 2013
- Length: 43:34
- Label: UMe
- Producer: Griffin Boice

The Lords of Salem (Original Motion Picture Soundtrack) is the soundtrack to the 2013 film of the same name directed by Rob Zombie. It was released through UMe on April 16, 2013, and featured licensed music as heard in the film, alongside original score composed by John 5 and Griffin Boice.

== Development ==
In October 2012, Zombie stated that he had roped in guitarist John 5 to compose the score while Griffin Boice served as the co-composer and music producer. Upon his involvement, John recalled on Zombie providing direction on how the sounds would be directed and was very primitive. John would use a violin bow across an acoustic guitar or other odd musical instruments, while also accompanying bassoons, French horns and other instruments for part of the score, which was "very unorthodox [...] but it really was a lot of fun". While John considered the workload to be challenging, he was satisfied by the final product, that turned out "amazing". Expressing his likeness to do unusual stuffs, by providing the "old high-school" formula, John opined on much of the cues were not in a certain time signature or key signature which was different from few of his musical works. John wanted the theme to be simple like Jaws (1975) or Halloween (1978), so that it could be easy to remember. He and Boice would receive visuals of one or few scenes and write the score citing those references. He also wanted to create "material that wouldn't distract audiences but also wouldn't be easily forgotten".

The 1967 song "All Tomorrow's Parties" from their eponymous album under the collaboration of the Velvet Underground and Nico, was featured in the film with Zombie describing it as the central song. He said, "Every RZ movie has at least one song that gets stuck in your head and changes the way you will forever hear the song". The soundtrack further accompanied several songs as heard in the film, which includes works from Bruce Springsteen, Rick James, Lou Reed, the Velvet Underground amongst others. Although not in the album, the film makes prominent use of Wolfgang Amadeus Mozart's Requiem and Johann Sebastian Bach's Sei gegrüsset, Jesu gütig, BWV 768.

== Release ==
The Lords of Salem's soundtrack was released by UMe on April 16, 2013. In April 2021, it was announced that the soundtrack would be released in vinyl LP through Waxwork Records. The album is pressed to 180-gram blood red and blue butterfly effect vinyl with white splatter a.k.a. "satan rite" with liner notes from Zombie, original artwork from Robert Sammelin, a 12 inch 16-pack booklet with unreleased photography from Zombie's personal archives, art print on heavyweight paper, printed inner sleeves and tip-on gatefold jackets with satin coating. The package also accompanied with a bonus live from the film the fictional black metal band Leviathan the Fleeing Serpent's vocalist Count Gorgan, called Corpse Eater: Satanic Misery Live for the Dead, which is pressed to the b-side of the 180-gram black vinyl.

== Track listing ==
No.	Title	Writer(s)	Performer	Length
1.	"Open Wide the Gates"		Meg Foster	0:29
2.	"The Curse of Margaret Morgan"	John 5; Griffin Boice		1:59
3.	"Blinded by the Light"	Bruce Springsteen	Manfred Mann's Earth Band	3:47
4.	"No Person in Number Five"		Judy Geeson; Sheri Moon Zombie	0:15
5.	"A Special Child"	John 5; Griffin Boice		2:25
6.	"Our Philosophy"		Torsten Voges	0:18
7.	"Crushing the Ritual"	Rob Zombie; John 5	Leviathan the Fleeing Serpent	3:53
8.	"Give It to Me Baby"	Rick James		4:08
9.	"Ladies Choice"		Jeff Phillips; Ken Foree; Sheri Moon Zombie	0:12
10.	"The Spirit of Radio"	Neil Peart; Geddy Lee; Alex Lifeson	Rush	4:56
11.	"Smash or Trash"		Sheri Moon Zombie; Ken Foree; Jeff Phillips	0:20
12.	"The Lords Theme"	John 5; Griffin Boice		0:49
13.	"Salem Rocks"		Sheri Moon Zombie; Ken Foree; Jeff Phillips	0:25
14.	"Venus in Furs"	Lou Reed	The Velvet Underground	5:09
15.	"Three Sisters"	John 5; Griffin Boice		2:06
16.	"You Know What I Think?"		Judy Geeson; Bruce Davison	0:21
17.	"I'll Always Know"	John 5; Griffin Boice		2:38
18.	"Apartment Five"	John 5; Griffin Boice		1:30
19.	"Lord Hear Us"		Judy Geeson; Patricia Quinn; Dee Wallace	0:35
20.	"All Tomorrow's Parties"	Lou Reed	The Velvet Underground; Nico	5:57
21.	"WIQZ News"		Donald Felix	1:22

== Reception ==
James Christopher Monger of AllMusic wrote "The resulting soundtrack, also features a handful of non-score tracks, including "Blinded by the Light" (Manfred Mann's Earth Band), "Give It to Me Baby" (Rick James), "The Spirit of Radio" (Rush), and "All Tomorrow's Parties" (the Velvet Underground & Nico), the latter of which serves as the film's musical centerpiece." Nick Schager of Slant Magazine wrote "there's nonetheless plenty of death-metal verve to the proceedings, scored by Zombie's bandmate John 5, along with Griffin Boice, to a mixture of skuzzy bass tones and a sparse piano theme." Rob Hunter of Film School Rejects wrote "the score by Griffin Boice and John 5 maintains a strong and deep base feel that sets an unsettling tone early on".

Eric Walkuski of JoBlo.com wrote "Zombie also uses his considerable musical expertise to craft another killer soundtrack, with original themes by John 5 complemented by tracks by Velvet Underground and Rush. It's a very effective score, supplementing the appropriately melancholy cinematography by Brandon Trost and Zombie's multiple references (direct or otherwise) to The Shining, The Exorcist and yes, Rosemary's Baby, not to mention numerous satanic-themed British horror flicks from the 60s and 70s." Regarding the music, Rob Nelson of Variety wrote "Zombie, having proven himself a connoisseur of gloomy '60s and '70s pop rock, here delivers another killer playlist, although his pick of the Velvet Underground's "Venus in Furs" seems a touch obvious."

== Accolades ==
Year	Award	Category	Recipient(s)	Result	Ref.
2013	Fright Meter Awards	Best Score	John 5	Won	
2014	Fangoria Chainsaw Awards	Best Score	John 5, Griffin Boice	Write-in	
