= Griffin Boice =

- Origin: Rexburg, Idaho, United States
- Genres: Pop, Rock, Hip hop, Film Music, Electro, Country
- Instruments: Guitar, Upright Bass, Electric Bass, Piano, Drums

Griffin Boice, is an American multi-platinum record producer, mixer, songwriter, and composer.

Born and raised in Rexburg, Idaho, Griffin grew up playing the double bass for 10 years in the symphony orchestra. Griffin was trained in the recording studio by Grammy nominated recording engineer Trent Walker. Moving to Los Angeles in 2008, he signed a music publishing deal with EMI/Sony as a producer / songwriter. Griffin has done software beta testing as well as co-creating sample libraries for virtual software instruments for Slate Digital.

Griffin has composed scores for feature films as well as music for advertisements, TV, and movie trailers.

Griffin Boice is the founder and creator of Puretone, a sonic meditation experience.

Griffin has worked with Black Eyed Peas, Wiz Khalifa, Rob Zombie, Hollywood Undead, John 5, The Saturdays, Leighton Meester, Christina Milian, Gavin Rossdale, Lucas Vidal, Clever aka Who Is Clever, Cassadee Pope, Aloe Blacc, Mat Musto aka Blackbear, Krayzie Bone, Bebe Winans, Frankie J, Paradiso Girls

== Discography ==
| Year | Artist | Album | Track |
|---|---|---|---|
| 2010 | Frankie J | | Crush |
| 2010 | Paradiso Girls | | Love Is All I Need |
| 2010 | Paradiso Girls | | Empty Frames |
| 2010 | The Saturdays | Headlines! | Puppet |
| 2010 | Black Eyed Peas | The Beginning | Someday |
| 2011 | Hollywood Undead | American Tragedy | Apologize |
| 2011 | Hollywood Undead | American Tragedy | Bullet |
| 2011 | Hollywood Undead | American Tragedy | Comin' in Hot |
| 2011 | Hollywood Undead | American Tragedy | S.C.A.V.A |
| 2011 | Hollywood Undead | American Tragedy | I Don't Wanna Die |
| 2011 | Hollywood Undead | American Tragedy | Tendencies |
| 2012 | It Boys! | Introduction | Shy |
| 2012 | It Boys! | Introduction | Right One |
| 2012 | Rob Zombie | Mondo Sex Head | Mars Needs Women (Griffin Boice Remix) |
| 2013 | Hollywood Undead | Notes from the Underground | "Another Way Out" |
| 2013 | Hollywood Undead | Notes from the Underground | "Believe" |
| 2013 | Hollywood Undead | Notes from the Underground | "Dead Bite" |
| 2013 | Hollywood Undead | Notes from the Underground | "From the Ground" |
| 2013 | Hollywood Undead | Notes from the Underground | "Kill Everyone" |
| 2013 | Hollywood Undead | Notes from the Underground | "Lion" |
| 2013 | Hollywood Undead | Notes from the Underground | "Medicine" |
| 2013 | Hollywood Undead | Notes from the Underground | "New Day" |
| 2013 | Hollywood Undead | Notes from the Underground | "One More Bottle" |
| 2013 | Hollywood Undead | Notes from the Underground | "Rain" |
| 2013 | Hollywood Undead | Notes from the Underground | "Up in Smoke" |
| 2013 | Hollywood Undead | Notes from the Underground | "Another Way Out (REMIX)" |
| 2015 | Hollywood Undead | Day of the Dead | "Take Me Home" |
| 2015 | Hollywood Undead | Day of the Dead | "Does Everybody in the World Have to Die" |
| 2015 | Hollywood Undead | Day of the Dead | "Party by Myself" |
| 2015 | Hollywood Undead | Day of the Dead | "Save Me" |
| 2015 | Hollywood Undead | Day of the Dead | "Guzzle, Guzzle" |
| 2015 | Hollywood Undead | Day of the Dead | "I'll Be There" |
| 2015 | Hollywood Undead | Day of the Dead | "Ghost" |
| 2015 | Hollywood Undead | Day of the Dead | "Sing" |
| 2017 | Hollywood Undead | Five | "Pray (Put 'Em in the Dirt)" |
| 2018 | Hollywood Undead | Psalms EP | "Gotta Let Go" |
| 2018 | Hollywood Undead | Psalms EP | "Another Level" |
| 2018 | Hollywood Undead | Psalms EP | "Something To Believe" |

== Film, tv, and trailer ==
| Year | Film | Directed by | Notes |
|---|---|---|---|
| 2012 | The Lords of Salem | Rob Zombie | Soundtrack/Score with John 5 |
| 2017 | 12 strong trailer | Trailer Music | Vocal producer - "Can you hear me knocking (the Rolling Stones) cover |
| 2018 | Trolls tv series | Dreamworks | composer "Sunshine all the time", "We are the trolls", "Glitter troll of the year" |
| 2018 | skyscraper trailer ft the rock | Super Bowl campaign | composer - Tom Petty "I Won't Back Down" (Tom Petty) cover ft JDM |
| 2018 | the best day of my life | Fernando González Molina | soundtrack / score with Lucas Vidal |
| 2019 | The Art Of Racing In The Rain | Trailer Music | composer "Pangaea" |
