= Tracklacers =

2010–2013 British music production and songwriting team

- Genres: Pop, Rock, Electronic dance music
- Years active: 2010, 2012–present
- Labels: Tracklacers
- Members: Steve Daly; Jon Keep
- Website: tracklacers.com

Tracklacers was a British music production and songwriting team consisting of Jon Keep and Steve Daly. Collaborations include Christina Aguilera, Pink, Lana Del Rey, The Saturdays, Afrojack, and Danja. The team was based in London and Los Angeles.

== History ==
=== Formation and early works ===
Jon Keep and Steve Daly signed and developed the British boy band JLS originally known as UFO through their label New Track City, before the band's The X Factor debut.

Following a name change during The X Factor auditions, UFO took on the name JLS (Jack the Lad Swing).

Steve Daly was a young singer-songwriter, buying his first guitar at the age of 12. At the age of 15, he joined the BRIT School to study performing arts, music production, and engineering. With a chance meeting in 2002, through a mutual friend Glenn Maher, he met Jon Keep outside a British pub and Tracklacers was born. Jon Keep began writing songs at the age of 8 but spent most of his teens focused on drama. At the age of 22, he began producing songs from his bedroom. In 2007, Tracklacers opened New Track City Studios.

=== 2011-present ===
Tracklacers worked with Christina Aguilera on her album Lotus, producing the song "Army of Me" which she performed at the 2012 American Music Awards.

Tracklacers are nominated for a Grammy Award for their work with Pink on her sixth studio album, The Truth About Love, producing the song "Where Did The Beat Go" with Billy Mann. The album was Pink's first number 1 on the Billboard 200 chart.

In 2012, the pair produced a comeback/spoof song for actor James Corden's wedding re-uniting his former boy band 'INsatiable', featuring One Direction, Sir Paul McCartney, Snow Patrol, Chris Martin, Olly Murs, JLS, Robbie Williams, Rizzle Kicks, and Gary Barlow.

The duo produced and co-wrote two songs ("Wish I Didn't Know" and "Promise Me") on The Saturdays' third studio album On Your Radar. They also produced "Spender" for UK rapper Smiler ft Lana Del Rey. Released in June, it was named by BBC Radio 1's Zane Lowe as the "Hottest record in the world".

According to sources, the group has had no credits since 2012 and has not been active since 2013 on social media, suggesting the group may be on hiatus or disbanded completely.
