= My Heart Takes Over =

Single by The Saturdays

from the album On Your Radar
- B-side: "So Stupid"
- Released: 11 November 2011
- Recorded: 2010
- Genre: Pop
- Length: 4:06; 3:44 (radio edit)
- Label: Polydor
- Songwriters: Ina Wroldsen; Steve Mac
- Producer: Steve Mac

The Saturdays singles chronology
"All Fired Up" (2011)	"My Heart Takes Over" (2011)	"30 Days" (2012)

Music video
- "My Heart Takes Over" on YouTube

Professional ratings
Review scores
Source	Rating
Digital Spy	4/5 stars

"My Heart Takes Over" is the third and final single released from British-Irish girl group The Saturdays' third studio album On Your Radar (2011). The song was written by Ina Wroldsen and Steve Mac and produced by Mac. The single was released on 11 November 2011 in Ireland and on 13 November 2011 in the UK by Polydor Records. The single is their twelfth overall single released to date. It debuted and peaked at number 15 in the UK Singles Chart on 20 November 2011. This became their first single to not sell over 100,000 copies.

== Promotion and live performances ==
There was less promotion for this single, than previous, due to Una Healy being pregnant at the time, and with tour rehearsals for the "All Fired Up Tour" taking place throughout November. However, on 1 November 2011, the band performed the track in the center of Oxford Street during the Christmas Lights switch-on. Following this, on 18 November 2011 The Saturdays performed the song at the Children in Need event, as well as on Loose Women and Daybreak the following week.

The band also performed the track during the "All Fired Up Tour" which took place throughout December. The tour was used as a key source of promotion for the song, and the album, On Your Radar. On tour, the band performed the song in female Santa Claus outfit, whilst filling the arenas, such as Wembley Arena with snow.

== Music video ==
The Saturdays in the music video for "My Heart Takes Over" (2011)

The girls flew over to Iceland on 30 September 2011 to shoot the music video for the song, which was directed by Elisha Smith-Leverock. A 57-second teaser was released onto YouTube on 10 October 2011, and finally the full video premiered on Vevo on 11 October 2011. The radio edit of the song was used in the video.

== Formats and track listings ==
CD single

1. "My Heart Takes Over" (radio edit) – 3:44
2. "So Stupid" – 3:22

UK digital single

1. "My Heart Takes Over" (radio edit) – 3:44
2. "My Heart Takes Over" (karaoke version) – 4:08
3. "So Stupid" – 3:22
4. "My Heart Takes Over" (Rokstone Mix) – 3:55
5. "My Heart Takes Over" (Ambient Mix) (iTunes pre-order only) – 4:04

Digital Radio Remixes EP

1. "My Heart Takes Over" – 4:06
2. "My Heart Takes Over" (Digital Dog Radio Edit) – 3:31
3. "My Heart Takes Over" (Soulseekerz Radio Edit) – 3:34
4. "My Heart Takes Over" (Richard Dinsdale Radio Edit) – 2:46
5. "My Heart Takes Over" (High Level Radio Edit) – 3:51
6. "My Heart Takes Over" (Oxford Hustlers Radio Edit) – 3:37
7. "My Heart Takes Over" (Steve More Radio Edit) – 4:20

Digital Club Remixes

1. "My Heart Takes Over" (Digital Dog Club Edit) – 6:37
2. "My Heart Takes Over" (Soulseekerz Club Edit) – 6:39
3. "My Heart Takes Over" (Richard Dinsdale Club Edit) – 6:45
4. "My Heart Takes Over" (High Level Club Edit) – 7:38
5. "My Heart Takes Over" (Oxford Hustlers Club Edit) – 6:44
6. "My Heart Takes Over" (Steve More Club Edit) – 6:51

Revamped Version

1. "My Heart Takes Over" (Radio Edit) – 3:44
2. "So Stupid" – 3:22
3. "My Heart Takes Over" (Rokstone Mix) – 3:55
4. "My Heart Takes Over" (Ambient Mix) – 4:04
5. "My Heart Takes Over" (Digital Dog Radio Edit) – 3:31
6. "My Heart Takes Over" (Soulseekerz Radio Edit) – 3:34
7. "My Heart Takes Over" (Richard Dinsdale Radio Edit) – 2:46
8. "My Heart Takes Over" (High Level Radio Edit) – 3:51
9. "My Heart Takes Over" (Oxford Hustlers Radio Edit) – 3:37
10. "My Heart Takes Over" (Steve More Radio Edit) – 4:20
11. "My Heart Takes Over" (Karaoke Version) – 4:08

== Chart performance ==
Chart (2011)	Peak position
Ireland (IRMA)	31
Scottish Singles Sales (Official Charts)	8
UK Singles (Official Charts)	15

== Release history ==
Region	Date	Format	Label
Ireland	11 November 2011	CD, Digital Download	Polydor Records
United Kingdom	13 November 2011	CD, Digital Download	Polydor Records
