= Notes from the Underground (Hollywood Undead album) =

Studio album by Hollywood Undead
- Released: January 8, 2013
- Recorded: December 2011 – September 2012
- Studio: The Beat Suite, Hollywood; Killingsworth Recording Company, LA; NRG Recording Studios, LA
- Genre: Rap rock; rap metal; alternative hip hop; alternative rock; rapcore
- Length: 40:27
- Label: A&M Octone
- Producer: Griffin Boice; Danny Lohner; S*A*M & Sluggo; Jorel "J-Dog" Decker

Hollywood Undead studio album chronology
American Tragedy (2011)	Notes from the Underground (2013)	Day of the Dead (2015)

Singles from Notes from the Underground
- 1. "We Are" Released: October 29, 2012; 2. "Dead Bite" Released: February 3, 2013; 3. "Another Way Out" Released: November 4, 2013

Notes from the Underground is the third studio album by American rap rock band Hollywood Undead. Originally set to release in Summer 2012, Notes from the Underground was released on January 8, 2013 in the United States and Canada. The album charted at No. 2 on the Billboard 200 with over 53,000 copies sold in its first week, making it their highest charting album to date, despite its predecessor American Tragedy selling around 67,000 copies in its first week. The album has spawned a generally positive reception.

== Background ==
Following extensive touring throughout 2011 to promote their second studio album, American Tragedy, and their first remix album, American Tragedy Redux, Charlie Scene announced plans to begin a third studio album in late November 2011. The announcement came after the conclusion of the band's World War III Tour with Asking Alexandria. Charlie Scene stated that the band will begin writing and recording demos while on the Buried Alive Tour with Avenged Sevenfold and begin recording once the tour concludes in December 2011. He also stated the album will sound more similar to Swan Songs than American Tragedy. Commenting on the difference in recording this time around, he stated, "I would say that this time the label gave us full creative control. I think it's going to be more like 'Swan Songs' than 'American Tragedy.' It'll be a mixture of both; I mean, we all grow as artists, we get older, and we've been doing it a long time so I think it'll be more like 'Swan Songs' and I think the fans are gonna like it a lot. It has been reported that member Charlie Scene sings the chorus instead of lead singer, Danny, in a song featured on the album titled 'Rain' with himself and Johnny 3 Tears taking control of the rapping.

In an interview with Keven Skinner of The Daily Blam, Charlie Scene revealed more information about the album's details. He revealed that there may be collaborations with guest artists on the album. "[Collaborations] would be awesome. I think it's bad to do [them] on your first couple records, to ask people on, but I think that the third record is kind of the point where maybe you can have somebody featured. I think it would be really cool to have someone else sing a chorus on one of our songs or do a verse." When asked about the masks, he replied that they will be upgrading their masks for the next album as well, as they did with the previous two albums. Charlie Scene also explained that the third album will be released much sooner than American Tragedy was, and predicts it will be released by the summer of 2012. "We have a bunch of songs written and we're writing more on the road. We brought some studio equipment with us so we've been able to work on stuff while we're touring. After this tour and we're back home, we'll be able to work with producers that we want to work with and dial all the stuff in that we have – skeletons of songs. We have some really good stuff that we're excited to work on for sure. One thing that we definitely don't want to do is take as long as it took for us to do 'American Tragedy' so there will definitely be a third record out next year and we're hoping for at the latest – summer." He also explained that the album will sound more like Swan Songs did, in the lines of it having more party tracks than American Tragedy did.

Artistdirect named the band's upcoming album as one of the most anticipated albums of 2012, along with other bands such as Linkin Park, Metallica, Black Sabbath, and others. The band revealed that Griffin Boice and Danny Lohner, who worked with the band on their previous albums, have returned to produce the upcoming third album. They also revealed that they will be upgrading their masks again, like they did prior to the release of their second album, American Tragedy.

During 2012, the band is scheduled to play in a series of music festivals, including Epicenter 2012, Summerfest, Aftershock, Rock Fest, and others, joining bands such as Stone Temple Pilots, Escape the Fate, Deftones, and more.

On October 19, they released the track "Dead Bite" from the album for a free download, along with a lyric video to it and announcement for the upcoming album's first single. On October 29, the lead single "We Are" was released along with the album title, named "Notes from the Underground". In a new interview with J-Dog and Da Kurlzz, they explained how the new album reminds them of the roots of Hollywood Undead, how when they first started recording how much fun they had doing without the label telling them what to do, he explained this record will be more like Swan Songs than American Tragedy. He also revealed the album will be released on January 8, 2013.

== Release and promotion ==
On December 11, the band announced that they will embark on a headlining tour titled "The Underground Tour", to promote Notes from the Underground. Tour dates range from January 8, 2013, to January 23, starting in Hollywood, California. A video was released in promotion of the upcoming tour.

On October 29, 2012, the first official single from Notes from the Underground, titled "We Are", was released on iTunes, along with a lyric video on the band's official YouTube channel. The song reached No. 33 on the Top Rock Songs chart. Johnny 3 Tears commented on the song saying, "The song is about collective resistance. It's the silent majority, but we’re using Los Angeles as the backdrop. Every time we work with Danny Lohner (producer), he takes our music to the next level. Think of it as an ode to our misled youth." A music video for "We Are" was released on December 11, which was directed by Slipknot member, Clown (Shawn Crahan). Da Kurlzz commented on their work with Clown, saying, "We are very excited to be working with someone that thinks as progressively about their art as we do. Clown is a great director, and together we are going to deliver something truly memorable.". USA Today described "We Are", "the horror-loving rap-rock outfit Hollywood Undead previews January's Notes From the Underground with We Are, an anthem for disenfranchised youth. A brutally captivating chorus wraps desolation and desperation into the lyrics 'We are made from broken parts ... we are broken from the start.' It's self-destructive and cathartic." The 3rd single and 3rd song off of "Notes From The Underground's" "Another Way Out" was the official theme song for WWE's pay-per-view event Payback on June 16, 2013. The music video for "Dead Bite" was released on August 20, 2013. Much of the music on this album remains rooted in hip-hop.

== Critical reception ==
Professional ratings
Review scores
Source	Rating
AllMusic	2/5 stars
aNewRisingMusic	3.5/5 stars
Artistdirect	5/5 stars
Bloody Disgusting	4/5 stars
Loudwire	3.5/5 stars
Newsday	C+

Notes from the Underground received generally positive reviews from music critics.

Rick Florino of Artistdirect gave Notes from the Underground 5 out of 5 stars, noting that it is the best album of 2013 and best album Hollywood Undead has done to date, describing that the album "practically bubbles over with intoxicating, invigorating, and infectious energy." He uses "Dead Bite" as an example, and described it as being between "an industrial grind and some of the funniest Charlie Scene lines yet". Commenting on the track "From the Ground", he describes it as the band's "heaviest cut ever" and "a testament to J-Dog's potent and powerful take on metal.", while pointing out "Rain" and "Outside" as the darker tracks on the record.

== Commercial performance ==
The album sold around 53,000 copies in its first week, peaking at number 2 on the Billboard 200. The album also reached No. 1 on the Billboard Canadian charts.

As of 2015, the album has sold more than 157,000 copies in the United States.

== Track listing ==
The album's track listing was announced on December 1, 2012 by Loudwire.

Standard Edition
No.	Title	Writer(s)	Producer	Length
1.	"Dead Bite"	Griffin Boice, Matthew Busek, Jorel Decker, Daniel Murillo, George Ragan, Jordon Terrell	Boice	3:38
2.	"From the Ground"	Boice, Busek, Decker, Murillo	Boice	3:45
3.	"Another Way Out"	Dylan Alvarez, Boice, Busek, Murillo, Terrell	Boice	2:47
4.	"Lion"	Boice, Murillo, Ragan	Boice	3:54
5.	"We Are"	Decker, Murillo, Danny Lohner, Ragan	Lohner	4:34
6.	"Pigskin"	Alvarez, Busek, Sam Hollander, Dave Katz, Murillo, Steve Shebby, Terrell	Hollander, Shebby	2:41
7.	"Rain"	Boice, Ragan, Terrell	Boice	3:41
8.	"Kill Everyone"	Boice, Murillo, Terrell	Boice	2:52
9.	"Believe"	Boice, Decker, Murillo, Ragan	Boice	4:14
10.	"Up in Smoke"	Alvarez, Boice, Decker, Murillo, Terrell	Boice	3:38
11.	"Outside"	Busek, Decker, Murillo, Ragan	Decker	4:43
Total length:				40:27

Unabridged Edition
No.	Title	Writer(s)	Producer	Length
12.	"Medicine"	Alvarez, Boice, Decker, Murillo, Ragan, Terrell	Boice	3:26
13.	"One More Bottle"	Alvarez, Boice, Murillo, Ragan, Terrell	Boice	3:40
14.	"Delish"	Alvarez, Busek, Decker, Murillo	Boice	3:07
Total length:				50:40

iTunes Bonus Track
No.	Title	Writer(s)	Producer	Length
15.	"I Am"	Decker, Murillo, Ragan, Terrell		3:23
Total length:				54:03

Best Buy Bonus Tracks
No.	Title	Writer(s)	Producer	Length
15.	"New Day"	Boice, Decker, Murillo, Ragan	Boice	3:50
16.	"We Are" (J-Dog and Killtron remix)	Decker, Lohner, Murillo, Ragan		4:36
17.	"Another Way Out" (Griffin Boice remix)	Boice, Alvarez, Busek, Murillo, Terrell		3:07
Total length:				62:15

Japanese Edition
No.	Title	Writer(s)	Producer	Length
15.	"New Day"	Boice, Decker, Murillo, Ragan	Boice	3:50
16.	"We Are" (J-Dog and Killtron remix)	Decker, Lohner, Murillo, Ragan		4:36
17.	"Another Way Out" (Griffin Boice remix)	Alvarez, Boice, Busek, Murillo, Terrell		3:07
18.	"I Am"	Decker, Murillo, Ragan, Terrell		3:23
Total length:				65:38

== Personnel ==
Credits adapted from AllMusic.

Hollywood Undead

- Daniel "Danny" Murillo – lead vocals, keyboards, guitars, bass, soundboards
- Jordon "Charlie Scene" Terrell – rap vocals, co-lead vocals, guitars
- Jorel "J-Dog" Decker – rap and unclean vocals, guitars, bass guitar, keyboards, synth, programming, producer
- George "Johnny 3 Tears" Ragan – rap vocals, bass guitar
- Dylan "Funny Man" Alvarez – rap vocals, soundboard, mixers
- Matthew "Da Kurlzz" Busek – hype vocals, drums, percussion

Additional musicians

- Daren Pfeifer – live drums and percussion
- John "John 5" Lowery – guitars

Production

- Griffin Boice – producer, engineer, mixing, programming, additional backing vocals on "Dead Bite" and various instruments
- Danny Lohner – producer
- S*A*M & Sluggo – producer

== Charts ==
=== Weekly charts ===
Chart (2013)	Peak position
Canadian Albums (Billboard)	1
Scottish Albums (OCC)	95
UK Albums (OCC)	99
UK Album Downloads (OCC)	70
UK Rock & Metal Albums (OCC)	7
US Billboard 200	2
US Top Alternative Albums (Billboard)	1
US Top Rock Albums (Billboard)	1
US Top Hard Rock Albums (Billboard)	1

=== Year-end charts ===
Chart (2013)	Position
US Top Rock Albums (Billboard)	70
