= Headlines! =

2010 extended play by The Saturdays

EP / Compilation album by the Saturdays
- Released: 13 August 2010
- Recorded: 2009–2010; California, Gothenburg, London
- Genres: Pop; dance-pop; electropop
- Length: 28:22
- Labels: Fascination; Geffen
- Producers: Louis Biancaniello; Arnthor Birgisson; Griffin Boice; Lukas Hilbert; Charlie Holmes; David Kreuger; Steve Mac; Per Magnusson; James Reynolds; Starsmith; Brio Taliaferro; Sam Watters; Jeremy Wheatley

The Saturdays chronology
Wordshaker (2009)	Headlines! (2010)	On Your Radar (2011)

Singles from Headlines!
- 1. "Missing You" Released: 5 August 2010; 2. "Higher" Released: 28 October 2010

Headlines! is the debut extended play (EP) by British-Irish girl group the Saturdays. It was released in Ireland on 13 August 2010 and in the United Kingdom on 16 August by Fascination Records. The EP includes the previously released singles "Forever Is Over" and "Ego" as well as a remix of album track "One Shot" from their previous album Wordshaker (2009) and five new songs. The album was preceded by the release of the lead single "Missing You" on 5 August 2010. It became the group's seventh top-ten hit when it peaked at number three in the UK and number six in Ireland.

Upon its release, the EP received mixed reception from critics, who were undecided about the new direction for the group but agreed on the need for more consistency. Commercially, Headlines! debuted in the UK at number three and number ten in Ireland, becoming their highest-charting album to date and following the success of "Missing You". The second single, "Higher", was released on 28 October 2010 after it was remixed featuring American rapper Flo Rida. The EP was re-issued on 8 November 2010 to include the tracks "Deeper", "Lose Control" and "Here Standing", which all previously appeared on Wordshaker.

== Background and development ==
The Saturdays never intended to release any material in 2010, as confirmed by Vanessa White in an interview with BBC News. "We weren't really supposed to be releasing anything til next year but we couldn't wait, so we decided to do a mini-album instead." It was something which both the label and group agreed to. Group member Rochelle Humes explained in an interview with Digital Spy:

"We finished [Wordshaker] and we'd come across some songs that we were really excited about. The songs that we had found were so current, and we'd written a couple of songs ourselves, [so] we wanted to just get everything out now."

With regards to recording for the new album the group revealed that they worked with previous collaborators Steve Mac and Ina Wroldsen as well as some new producers. The group would also go on to explain exactly what a mini-album was, "a normal album would maybe consist of 12 or 13 tracks, but here we have eight. It'll be cheaper for the fans – and then hopefully we'll finish the other songs and put something else out later."

The Mini-LP includes the song "Died in Your Eyes", a cover of a song featured on Kristinia DeBarge's 2009 album Exposed. Though Ryan Love from entertainment website Digital Spy, said that only a few people will realise that "Died in Your Eyes" is a cover, "it's a shame that one of Headlines!' five new songs turns out to be second-hand". Another member of the group, Una Healy confirmed that the song "Higher", which has been performed by the group several times during festivals over the summer, would be one of the songs on the EP. Meanwhile, Humes would tip "Higher" to be the second single from the album whilst Mollie King told 'Digital Spy' "We're definitely having another single from the album after 'Missing You' and probably another after that if all goes well".

== Critical reception ==
Professional ratings
Review scores
Source	Rating
BBC Music	(mixed)
Daily Express	(mixed)
Daily Mirror	(3/4)
Daily Star	(positive)
Digital Spy	4/5 stars
MusicOMH	2.5/5 stars
NME	(5/10)
OK!	(3/5)
Virgin Media	3/5 stars
Yahoo Music	(5/10)

The album has generated generally mixed reviews from music critics. Ryan Love of Digital Spy gave Headlines! a positive review saying it "falls a little short of pop gold status" and that its "positives certainly outweigh the negatives", and concluded by stating that it "offers a tantalising glimpse of what to expect from the group's next album proper." Gavin Martin of The Mirror called Headlines! the "CD of the week", awarding it three out of four. He felt that the Saturdays "assert a more serious side of their personality" and noticed that although Headlines! is not "a cover story, [...] it will keep things ticking over nicely for them." Sarah-Louise James of Daily Star said that the album "packs a pop punch" and complimented the "sheer swooning, girly drama of Died in Your Eyes", as well as the songs "Higher" and "Puppet". OK! magazine praised the songs "Missing You" and "Higher" and noticed that the band has developed "a feisty edge", and concluded by calling the album "short but sweet". Ian Gittins of Virgin Media gave the album three out of five stars, however he called it "opportunist" and felt that it "reeks of desperation", but stated that it implies "the Saturdays' best times are ahead of them".

Luke Winkie of MusicOMH gave the album a mixed review. He said that the group's "charm doesn't translate well over the weight of a full album's listen" and criticized the lack of strong material saying that "there isn't enough to these songs to merit more than a cursory scan" and that the group "hit the same safe notes, and stick to the same safe themes for all 30 minutes of the album." Fraser McAlpine of BBC Music criticized the band for mixing "cast-off recordings with previously released album tracks and present[ing] it as a new mini-album" and felt that the Saturdays are "in some kind of decline". He said "what you get for your money are two potential future hits, four songs you probably already own, one slightly mad album track – Puppet – and a solid-gold clunker" and noticed that it is not "a mini-album, it's a double A-side, or an EP at best." Simon Gage of the Daily Express said that although the album is "not exactly bad", it sounds "much like everything else out there" and "in the parlance of the kids it’s aimed at, a bit "whatever"". Jaime Gill of Yahoo Music complimented the songs "Higher" and "Puppet", but said that "if the intention is to whip up a storm of excitement, [...] then it's a case of mission unaccomplished". Hazel Sheffield of NME called the album "a summer hatchet-job" and although she praised the single "Missing You", she felt that "the rest is filler in Rihanna's slipstream" and awarded the album five out of ten.

== Promotion and singles ==
It was preceded by the release of "Missing You", an electropop song incorporating elements of trance and synthpop which was released as the lead single on 9 August 2010. It features autotuned vocals. The Saturdays have performed the single at T4 on the Beach 2010, where member of the band, Mollie King was absent from the performance, after a horsefly bite left her on crutches and thus unable to perform. King was absent from a number of other performances The Saturdays performed to promote the single. On 1 August 2010, all of the members of The Saturdays performed on Alan Carr: Chatty Man and they were interviewed on GMTV three days later. On Friday 5 August 2010 the song debuted on the Irish Singles Chart at number forty-two. On 10 August 2010 the group appeared at the Habbo Hotel, London for a 'Meet and Greet' session in promotion of "Missing You". It has so far reached #3 on the UK Singles Charts becoming their 5th top 5, and 3rd top 3 single, and it has so far peaked at #6 in the Irish charts, equalling their best back in 2009 with "Just Can't Get Enough". The group's next single "Higher" was released digitally on 31 October 2010 and physically 1 November 2010. Fascination Records announced on 8 October 2010, via the group's official website, that an expanded version of the mini album would be released on 8 November 2010. The new version will feature three further songs from Wordshaker, including: "Here Standing", "Lose Control" and "Deeper" as well as the remixed version of "Higher" featuring Flo Rida.

== Track listing ==
No.	Title	Writer(s)	Producer(s)	Length
1.	"Missing You"	Lukas Hilbert; Alexander Kronlund	Hilbert; James F. Reynolds (add.)	3:41
2.	"Ego"	Steve Mac; Ina Wroldsen	Mac	2:59
3.	"Higher"	Arnthor Birgisson; Wroldsen	Arnthor	3:27
4.	"Forever Is Over" (Radio Edit)	Samuel Watters; Louis Biancaniello; James Bourne	Biancaniello; Watters	3:22
5.	"Died in Your Eyes"	Pamela Sheyne; Rune Westberg; Dean Inflo 1st Josiah	Charlie Holmes; Inflo 1st (vocal)	4:01
6.	"Karma"	Mac; Wroldsen	Mac	3:40
7.	"Puppet"	Brittany Burton; Griffin Boice; Claudia Mills	Boice; Chris Young (vocal)	3:42
8.	"One Shot" (Starsmith Mix)	Wroldsen; Per Magnusson; David Kreuger	Magnusson; Kreuger; Starsmith (add.); Jeremy Wheatley (add.); Brio Taliaferro (add.)	3:31
Total length:				28:22

iTunes Store pre-order bonus content
No.	Title	Length
9.	"Forever Is Over" (Orange Monkey Acoustic version)	3:51
10.	"Ego" (Radio 1 Live Lounge Acoustic version)	3:15
11.	"Forever Is Over" (Music video)	3:31
12.	"Ego" (Music video)	3:08
13.	"Missing You" (Music video)	3:50

Expanded edition bonus tracks
No.	Title	Writer(s)	Producer(s)	Length
9.	"Here Standing"	Jordan Omley; Michael Mani, Nina Woodford	Omley; Mani	3:36
10.	"Lose Control"	Jörgen Elofsson; Pär Westerlund	Elofsson; Westerlund	3:19
11.	"Deeper"	Una Healy; Mollie King; Frankie Sandford; Vanessa White; Rochelle Wiseman; Wroldsen	Justin Trugman; Oliver Goldstein	4:05
12.	"Higher" (featuring Flo Rida)	Birgisson; Wroldsen; Tramar Dillard	Arnthor Birgisson	3:21

== Credits ==
Headlines! was recorded from 2009 to 2010, promoted by Fascination Records, under license to Geffen Records, for Polydor Records.

=== Personnel ===
- Fredrik Anderson – rhythm arrangement, keyboards, programming
- Dick Beetham – mastering
- Louis Biancaniello – producer, audio mixing, keyboards, programming
- Arnthor Birgisson – producer, vocal arranger
- Barry Blue – guitar
- Griffin Boice – producer, audio mixing, programming
- James Bourne – guitar
- RaVaughn Brown – additional vocals
- Chippe Carlson – rhythm arrangement, keyboards, programming
- Richard Edgeler – assistant audio mixing
- Serban Gheana – audio mixing
- Choukri Gustmann – engineer
- John Hanes – engineer
- Lukas Hilbert – producer
- Charlie Holmes – producer, guitar, keyboards, bass, drums, percussion
- Ash Howes – audio mixing
- David Kreuger – producer, vocal arranger, rhythm arrangement, keyboards, programming
- Paul Lamalfa – assistant recording engineer
- Chris Laws – engineer, Pro Tools, programming
- Steve Mac – producer, keyboard, vocal arranger
- Per Magnusson – producer, vocal arranger, rhythm arrangement, keyboards, programming
- Esbjörn Öhrwall – guitars
- Daniel Pursey – engineer, drums, percussion
- James Reynolds – audio mixing, additional production, synths
- Tim Roberts – assistant engineer, assistant audio mixer
- Ben Robbins – recording
- Ben Roulston – engineer
- Finlay Dow-Smith (Starsmith) – additional producer, remixer
- Fred Vessey – engineer
- Sam Watters – producer, audio mixing
- Brio Taliaferro – additional producer, audio mixing
- Jeremy Wheatley – additional producer, audio mixing
- Ina Wroldsen – additional vocals, vocal arranger
- Chris Young – vocal producer

=== Recording locations ===
Sweden

- Fishhead Studio (Gothenburg)

United States

- Homesite 13 (Novato, California)
- Henson Recording Studios (Hollywood, California)
- The Beat Suite, (Los Angeles, California)

United Kingdom

- Universal Studio (London)
- Rokstone Studios (London)
- Dean Street Studios (London)
- Rockin' Horse Studios (London)
- Twenty One Studios (London)

== Charts and certifications ==
=== Weekly charts ===
Chart (2010)	Peak position
European Top 100 Albums	10
Irish Albums (IRMA)	10
Scottish Albums (Official Charts)	4
UK Albums (Official Charts)	3

=== Year-end charts ===
Chart (2010)	Position
UK Albums (OCC)	93

=== Certifications ===
Country	Provider	Certification
United Kingdom	BPI	Gold

== Release history ==
List of release dates, record label and format details
Country	Date	Format	Label	Edition
Ireland	13 August 2010	Digital download,	Polydor, Fascination	Standard
United Kingdom	16 August 2010	CD, digital download,	Polydor, Fascination	Standard
United Kingdom	8 November 2010	CD, digital download,	Polydor, Fascination	Expanded
