= Missing You (The Saturdays song) =

2010 single by the Saturdays

Single by The Saturdays

from the EP Headlines!
- B-side: "Ready to Rise"
- Released: 5 August 2010 (Ireland) 8 August 2010 (UK)
- Recorded: 2010
- Genre: Electropop, Synth-pop
- Length: 3:42
- Label: Fascination
- Songwriters: Lukas Hilbert, Alexander Kronlund
- Producer: Lukas Hilbert

The Saturdays singles chronology
"Ego" (2009)	"Missing You" (2010)	"Higher" (2010)

Music video
- "Missing You" on YouTube

"Missing You" is a song by British-Irish girl group The Saturdays from their debut extended play, Headlines!. Written by Alexander Kronlund and Lukas Hilbert with production from Hilbert and James Reynolds, the song was released as the EP's lead single on 5 August 2010 in Ireland and on 8 August 2010 in the UK as a digital download; it was also released as a CD single a day after its UK release. It is an electropop and synth-pop song whose lyrics centre on being in a relationship where the passion has died, but still being addicted to the love that used to exist. The group described the song as "an updated version of their sound" and was fun to record and experiment with. "Missing You" is more out-there than that rest of "Headlines!".

The single received negative reviews from music critics, who criticised the auto-tuned vocals and the song's production, which lacked energy. An accompanying music video features scenes of the group dancing on a beach in Málaga, Spain. It peaked at number six on the Irish Singles Chart and number three on the UK Singles Chart, beaten by Flo Rida's "Club Can't Handle Me" featuring David Guetta and Eminem's "Love the Way You Lie" featuring Rihanna. It was the second time that the group had lost out to Flo Rida in chart battle although it is their fourth top-ten entry in Ireland and seventh in the UK. The official remix features British grime artist Professor Green.

== Composition ==
The Saturdays "Missing You"
"Missing You" is an electro song that has elements of trance.

"Missing You" is an electro song incorporating elements of trance. It was written by Lukas Hilbert and Alexander Kronlund. According to the group "it's about being in a relationship where the passion has gone – so you're missing that spark. It's quite deep, actually, for a pop song." The critics also agreed, calling the lyrics "surprisingly dark". It has also been described as "experimental" and an "updated version" of their previous sound. The production was described as "pretty" but "limp" as the "melody is traded for a random 'miss, missing you' refrain". Some of the group also make use of Auto-Tune on their vocals, mainly Frankie Sandford, whilst Mollie King uses the natural croak in her voice and Vanessa White's vocals had a nasal tone. White sings lead vocals on the first chorus, Healy sings lead vocals on the second chorus and Wiseman sings lead vocals on the third and final chorus.

== Critical reception ==
"Missing You" received generally negative reviews from music critics. Tony Falls of Virgin Media was highly critical of the song, awarding it zero out of ten. "Never have a group got by with so little a contribution to music, but so big a contribution to rolling back feminist progress. 'Missing You' sounds like an album track. Not something you’d hear as a comeback track that would uplift your lost consciousness about the girls’ disappearance. The idea of shooting the video in Spain for this type of song is a nice choice, but Frankie is overly tanned. Please kill me. A vacuous set of reviews for a vacuous group of girls."

Fraser McAlpine gave the song a mixed review, awarding it three out of five stars. He pointed out that fans of the group would be divided on the song. "Something hidden deep in the song's DNA is engagingly bad, or worryingly good, and it's got everyone's quality alarms jangling like a wind-chime in a hurricane ... [There is a moment of] appreciation for the bit where they sing "begging to get back together" ... It's slow, moody, ponderous, a little bit boring at times, but when it gets to that bit, it's ... the good bit." He also called the song a "grower" Nick Levine of Digital Spy gave the song a positive review saying, "'Missing You' is a post-break-up song with a modishly rave-tinged production... and after a few spins the chorus wiggles into your brain like a tapeworm that missed the turning marked 'digestive tract' ... The charts? Sorted. Your hearts? Well, that's a matter of personal preference of course, but, the odd rocky patch excepted, they've had ours since 'Up'."

== Chart performance ==
Upon digital release the single debuted in Ireland at number forty-two. Then upon CD release, "Missing You" became the group's fourth top-ten entry by peaking at number six. It is the group's joint-best charting single in Ireland and the second single to chart at number six, after "Just Can't Get Enough" reached the same position back in March 2009. On 14 August 2010, the single debuted in Scotland at number two. Then a day later, "Missing You" debuted at number three on the UK Singles Chart, despite being tipped to take the number one spot according to mid week figures. It was beaten by "Club Can't Handle Me" by Flo Rida featuring David Guetta and "Love the Way You Lie" by Eminem featuring Rihanna, which respectively took the number one and number two positions. It also entered the UK Download Chart at number three. It is the second single by the group to be beaten by Flo Rida in a battle for the number one chart position although, it is their seventh top-ten UK entry.

== Music video ==
=== Background and synopsis ===
The music video for "Missing You" was filmed in late May 2010, in Málaga, Spain and was directed by Chris Cottam. It premiered 26 June on the group's official website. Of the video shoot, the group said "Every time we'd turned round, our dresses would get stuck to our legs! That was a nightmare. It was either that or slipping over."

One frame of the video for "Missing You" where the Saturdays are seen in Summer maxi dresses, dancing on the beach in Málaga.

The video begins with footage of Frankie Sandford sitting in a tree; Mollie King is show riding a bike along a dustry road; while Vanessa White is leaning against the walls of a crumbling building; the camera flies past Rochelle Wiseman, who stands on the beach by the water's edge and Una Healy drives a convertible car along a dusty road. As the chorus plays for the first time, the cameras follow the girls as they respectively walk around their surroundings, bar Sandford who remains in the tree and White who does not move from her spot. In the verse following, King is sitting by the road side with her bike and Wiseman is seen sitting on the rocks near the water's edge. Then as the chorus breaks for the second time the girls are seen dancing a choreographed routine on a sandy beach. Each is wearing a flowing maxi dress (see image alongside).

The song's bridge mainly focusses on footage of the girls at a beach party dancing to the DJ, while the final run of the chorus sees the camera rotate around the girls as they dance on the beach. There is a brief view of the seaside villas in the background. It ends by showing the footage from the scenes at the start of the video, showing each of the girls in turn.

=== Reception ===
A reviewer from 'Osoblog.tv' was less critical of the video, instead calling it an advert for the Summer. "The band walked around on a beach and danced in a rock pool (with artful splashing) while dressed in a variety of beachwear. It makes us want to go on a holiday." The reviewer from OK! magazine agreed saying "quite frankly the whole thing has us aching for a summer holiday" and then compared it a holiday the group might go on. "All in all it's a pretty standard summer for the girls who show off super toned physiques, plenty of midriff and a collection of maxi-dresses we can't help, but covet."

== Live performances ==
The Saturdays have performed the single at T4 on the Beach 2010, where member of the band, Mollie King was absent from the performance, after a horsefly bite left her on crutches and thus unable to perform. King was absent from a number of other performances the Saturdays performed to promote the single. On 1 August 2010, all of the members of The Saturdays performed on Alan Carr: Chatty Man and they were interviewed on GMTV three days later. On 10 August 2010, the group appeared at the Habbo Hotel in London, for a 'Meet and Greet' session in promotion of "Missing You".

== Formats and track listings ==
CD single

1. "Missing You" – 3:41
2. "Ready To Rise" – 3:35

Digital download: acoustic remix

1. "Missing You" (Acoustic Version) – 3:20

Digital EP

1. "Missing You" – 3:41
2. "Missing You" (Cahill Club Mix) – 6:04
3. "Missing You" (Steve Smart Club Mix) – 6:15
4. "Missing You" (Cahill Radio Edit) – 3:31 [Exclusive to iTunes Store]

Revamped version

1. "Missing You" – 3:41
2. "Ready To Rise" – 3:35
3. "Missing You" (Acoustic Version) - 3:20
4. "Missing You" (Cahill Radio Edit) – 3:31
5. "Missing You" (Steve Smart Radio Edit) - 3:21
6. "Missing You" (Cahill Club Mix) – 6:04
7. "Missing You" (Steve Smart & Westfunk Remix) - 6:15

== Credits ==
A-side: "Missing You"

- Recorded at Universal Studio London and Fishhead Studio, Gothenburg (Sweden).
- Production – Lukas Hilbert, James Reynolds (additional)
- Songwriters – Alexander Kronlund, Lukas Hilbert
- Audio mixing – James Reynolds
- Engineered – Choukri Gustmann, Ben Roulston
- Instrument programming – Lukas Hilbert
- Additional synths – James Reynolds.
- Mastering – Dick Beetham

B-side: "Ready to Rise"

- Songwriters – Colin Campsie, Robin Lynch, Niklas Olovson, Una Healy, Mollie King, Frankie Sandford, Vanessa White, Rochelle Wiseman

== Charts ==
Weekly chart performance for "Missing You"
Chart (2010)	Peak position
European Hot 100 Singles (Billboard)	12
Euro Digital Songs (Billboard)	6
Ireland (IRMA)	6
Scottish Singles Sales (Official Charts)	2
UK Singles (Official Charts)	3
UK Airplay (Music Week)	1

=== Year-end charts ===
Chart (2010)	Position
UK Singles (Official Charts Company)	108

== Certifications ==
Certifications and sales for "Missing You"
Region	Certification	Certified units/sales
United Kingdom (BPI)	Silver	200,000^{^}
^{^} Shipments figures based on certification alone.

== Release history ==
Release dates and formats for "Missing You"
Region	Date	Format	Label(s)	Ref.
Ireland	5 August 2010	Digital download	Polydor	
United Kingdom	8 August 2010	Digital download	Fascination	
Ireland	9 August 2010	Digital download: acoustic remix	Polydor	
Ireland and UK	9 August 2010	CD single	Polydor; Fascination	
United Kingdom	12 August 2010	Digital download: acoustic remix	Fascination	
