= Higher (The Saturdays song) =

2010 single by the Saturdays

Single by The Saturdays featuring Flo Rida

from the EP Headlines!
- B-side: "Had It with Today"
- Released: 28 October 2010
- Recorded: 2009–2010
- Studio: Los Angeles
- Genre: Pop; dance-pop; synth-pop
- Length: 3:31 (album version); 3:18 (single version)
- Label: Fascination
- Songwriter(s): Arnthor Birgisson; Ina Wroldsen
- Producer(s): Arnthor Birgisson

The Saturdays singles chronology
"Missing You" (2010)	"Higher" (2010)	"Notorious" (2011)

Flo Rida singles chronology
"Boom Shacka" (2010)	"Higher" (2010)	"Turn Around (5, 4, 3, 2, 1)" (2010)

Music video
- "Higher" on YouTube

Music video
- "Higher" (ft. Flo Rida) on YouTube

"Higher" is a song by British-Irish girl group The Saturdays from their debut EP, Headlines!. Written by Ina Wroldsen and co-written & produced by Arnthor Birgisson, the song was released on 28 October 2010 as the second and final single from the EP. In preparation for its release, the single was remixed to feature new vocals from American rapper Flo Rida after the rapper's single "Club Can't Handle Me" beat the group's previous single "Missing You" to number one; it was the second time they had lost the position to Flo Rida. Rochelle Humes jokingly said that the group would never get a number one until they collaborated with him.

Flo Rida personally offered the collaboration for both his and the group's fans. Critics generally praised the song as the strongest offering from Headlines!, for being infectious, catchy and feisty. An accompanying music video for the song was shot in Los Angeles at Fox Studios, at the end of August 2010, and features the girls dancing through a New York City traffic jam. The single remix of the song premiered on 16 September 2010 through Capital FM, while a new version of the video featuring Flo Rida premiered on 9 October 2010. "Higher" was successful, peaking in the top-ten in the Scottish and UK singles charts as well as top-fifteen in Ireland. It also won the 2011 Popjustice £20 Music Prize.

== Background ==
After the group's previous single "Missing You" was beaten to number one for a second time by U.S. rapper Flo Rida, Wiseman joked that the group would have to record a song with him before they could top the UK Singles Chart. Flo Rida responded by telling The Daily Star, "If we could make a collaboration happen I would be up for that. I don't know much about The Saturdays but we put smiles on people's faces when we make music, which counts more than getting number ones". Then several days later it was confirmed that a collaboration had gone ahead with Flo Rida recording vocals for one of the group's songs though the group were not present when the recording took place. Yahoo! Music confirmed that the rapper reached out to the group and "[they] graciously agreed to his generous offer". The group's official website confirmed that he will feature on a brand new version of "Higher" which will be released as the next single from Headlines!.

== Composition ==
"Higher" was confirmed to be a new single from the group, back in April 2010 when Rochelle Wiseman was interviewed for 'Entertainment-Focus'. It is an uptempo song, with a guitar-based melody. It also has "surging beats" and a "breathless chorus". Wiseman said "Higher is a classic Saturdays pop tune.... We can't help but dance around when it comes on!" The lyrics show a more serious side to the group who make use of auto-tuning on their vocals. The production was described as "hectic". The single version of the song features new vocals from US rapper, Flo Rida, and was debuted on Capital FM on 16 September 2010.

== Critical reception ==
Professional ratings
Review scores
Source	Rating
Digital Spy	4/5 stars

"Higher" received positive reviews from music critics who praised the song for being infectious and catchy. Ryan Love of Digital Spy said "The synth-laden 'Higher' has become an instant fan fave following recent live performances and, with its infectious chorus and super-sassy lyrics, it's not hard to see why. Una Healy's middle 8 isn't quite as thrilling on record as it is on stage, but don't let the ill-advised use of Auto-Tune spoil this moment of close-to pop perfection." Gavin Martin of The Mirror agreed saying "they assert a more serious side of their personality" with "the guitar-sprung Higher". When the new version premiered Robert Copsey of Digital Spy said "Over a bed of hawkish sirens and thumping electro beats, Frankie and co. inform us that no man is gonna hold them down... the sassy lyrics, perky production and a double chorus that sounds like it was recorded on a trampoline easily puts this track into pole position as our new favourite Sats single."

A review from OK! magazine said "Headlines! also includes 'Higher', a song that proves the girls have developed a feisty edge!". Fraser McAlpine of BBC Music was also praising the song when he reviewed Headlines!. After referring to "Missing You"'s inability to top the UK Singles Chart he said "[it's a shame] because in quality confections like 'Higher', and the languid 'Died in Your Eyes', there's ample proof that the band's heartbroken girls-together thing still has a lot going for it." Jamie Gill of Yahoo! Music picked out "Higher" as one of two highlights on the album. Gill said "Higher may be blighted by the same bustlingly hectic production that infects so much of the album, but its surging beats and breathless chorus lift it to anthemic levels nonetheless..."

== Awards ==
On 6 September 2011, "Higher" was awarded the Popjustice £20 Music Prize, as voted for by members in the music industry, and fans, via social network sites such as Twitter. "Higher" beat off competition from Adele, Jessie J and Take That, all of whom had enjoyed critical approval and chart success that year, with both #1 singles and albums.

== Chart performance ==
"Higher" the album version, first charted on the UK Singles Chart at number eighty-six following the song's announcement as a single, following strong digital sales of Headlines!. The remix featuring Flo Rida premiered on 16 September 2010 on Capital FM and the group's official YouTube page. On 25 September "Higher" debuted at number sixteen in Scotland almost three weeks before the single was released. The single peaked at number ten after its physical release on the UK Singles Chart and at number nine on the Scottish Charts.

== Music video ==
=== Background and release ===
The girls are seen in their summer outfits, sat on the stairs of a New York building on a bright day. A reflection of the sunlight can be seen across the top of the frame.

The group flew out to Los Angeles to film the video for the song. Flo Rida is said to have recorded parts for the video separately. The video was directed by Taylor Cohen. A video clip on the group's website revealed that the video was filmed against a New York City backdrop at Fox Studios, a set previously used by Britney Spears. The backdrop includes an authentic yellow school bus and yellow taxi-cab. The video featuring the album version of "Higher" premiered on ITV2 and on the Saturdays' official website on 18 September 2010. A new version of the video featuring Flo Rida premiered on the Vevo network on 9 October 2010.

=== Synopsis ===
The video begins with a typical New York City gridlock scene where cars and yellow taxi-cabs wait in queues of traffic. A man crosses the busy road. The camera shifts to a black car which pulls up at the lights. Inside are the Saturdays dancing to the radio. A man is seen knocking on car windows begging for money, another man stands at a café and a little girl in the car opposite sticks her tongue out. Then as the chorus kicks in the group leave the car and stroll down the street. A group of dancers stands on the steps of a nearby house dancing. As the second verse kicks in the group sits on a bench, enjoying each other's company. A little girl comes along and leads the group away by grabbing Rochelle Wiseman's hand. As the chorus starts for the second time the group are seen sat on the stairs of a building. At a nearby construction site, a male and female worker are dancing. The group then walk through the traffic seen in at the beginning of the video. During the bridge, the camera focuses on Mollie King and Una Healy. In the final moments of the video the group are joined by the locals and everyone dances in between the cars. The video ends with some of the group stood on cars throwing glitter in the air and then stepping back inside their black car.

The alternative edit of the video with Flo Rida simply intersects the original video with two new scenes of Flo Rida in a car.

== Live performances ==
The Saturdays performed "Higher" several times during music festivals over summer 2010, but had to perform without Mollie King after she got bitten by a horse-fly and became ill. They performed the single together for the first time at the end of the second episode of their four-part reality TV series, The Saturdays: 24/7, on 2 September 2010. "Higher" was also part of the setlist during their performance at the 2010 Help the Heroes concert on 12 September 2010. On 4 October 2010, they were invited to perform at the season finale of Britain's Next Top Model.

== Formats and track listing ==
CD single

1. "Higher" (featuring Flo Rida) - 3:19
2. "Had It with Today" - 3:14 (written by Una Healy)

Digital EP

1. "Higher" (featuring Flo Rida) - 3:18
2. "Higher" (7th Heaven Remix Radio Edit) - 3:49
3. "Higher" (Stonebridge Remix Radio Edit) - 3:24
4. "Higher" (Fascination Remix Radio Edit) - 3:36
5. "Higher" (Ultimate Remix Radio Edit) - 3:50 [iTunes only]

Revamped Version

1. "Higher" (featuring Flo Rida) - 3:19
2. "Had It with Today" - 3:14
3. "Higher" (7th Heaven Remix Radio Edit) - 3:49
4. "Higher" (Stonebridge Remix Radio Edit) - 3:24
5. "Higher" (Fascination Remix Radio Edit) - 3:36
6. "Higher" (Ultimate Remix Radio Edit) - 3:50
7. "Higher" (7th Heaven Club Remix) - 6:24
8. "Higher" (Stonebridge Remix) - 5:39
9. "Higher" (Fascination Club Remix) - 7:04
10. "Higher" (Ultimate Club Remix) - 6:38

== Personnel ==
"Higher" was recorded at Dean Street Studios, London.

- Songwriters – Arnthor Birgisson, Ina Wroldsen
- producer – Arnthor Birgisson
- audio mixer – Ash Howes
- mastering engineer – Dick Beetham
- recording engineer – Ben Robbins
- vocal arrangement – Arnthor Birgisson, Ina Wroldsen
- guitars – Esbjörn Öhrwall
- lead vocals – The Saturdays
- background vocals – Ina Wroldsen
- additional vocals (for the radio edit) – Flo Rida

== Charts and certifications ==
=== Charts ===
Chart (2010)	Peak position
European Hot 100 Singles (Billboard)	32
Euro Digital Song Sales (Billboard)	18
Ireland (IRMA)	11
Scotland (OCC)	9
UK Singles (OCC)	10

=== Certifications ===
Region	Certification	Certified units/sales
United Kingdom (BPI)	Platinum	600,000^{‡}
^{‡} Sales+streaming figures based on certification alone.

== Release history ==
Country	Date	Label	Format
Ireland	28 October 2010	Polydor Records	Digital EP
United Kingdom	31 October 2010	Fascination Records	Digital EP
United Kingdom	1 November 2010	Fascination Records	CD Single
