= Macklemore–Ed Sheeran tour controversy =

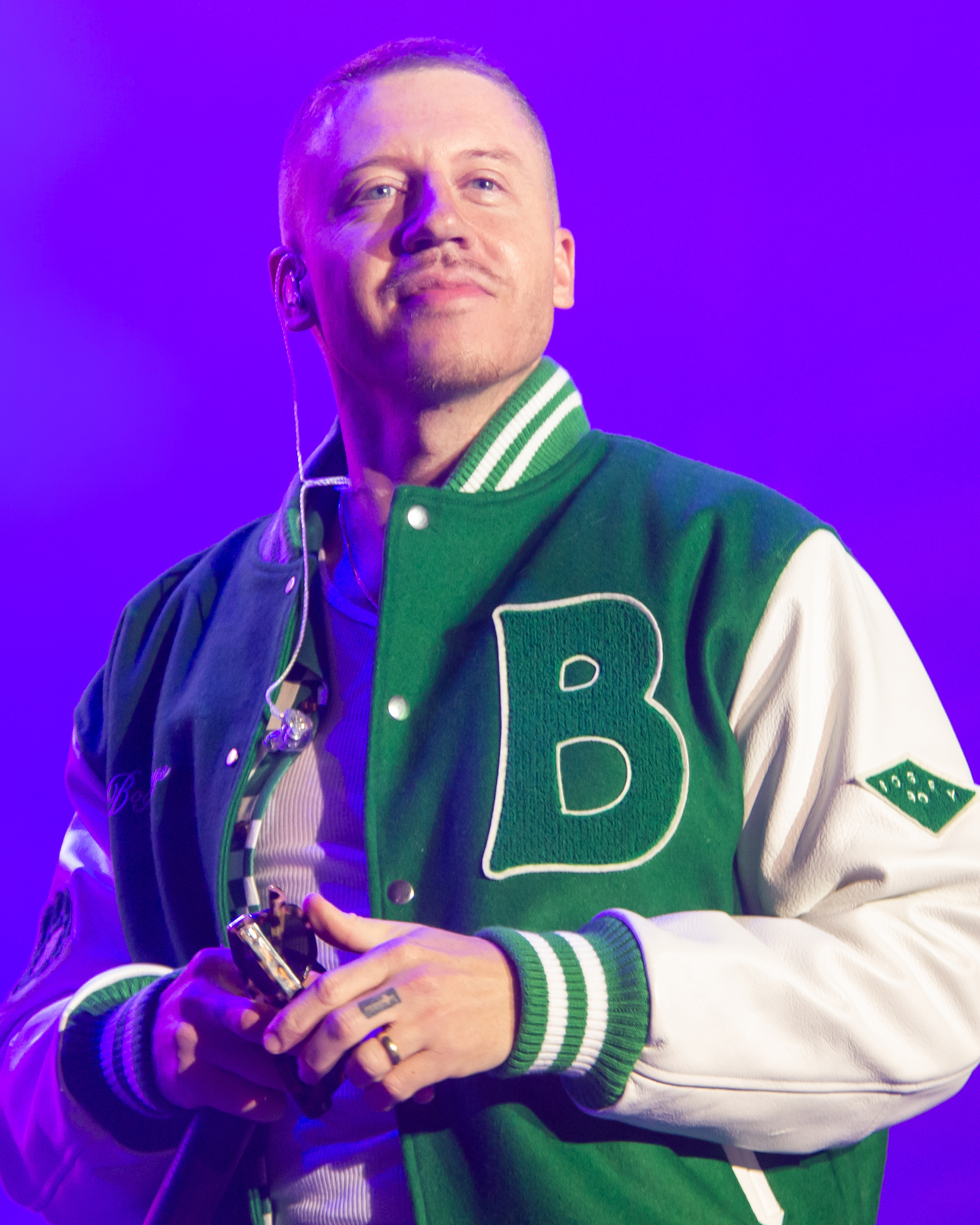
Macklemore in 2022

Ed Sheeran in 2022

In September 2026, English singer-songwriter Ed Sheeran and his team removed American rapper Macklemore as a supporting act from Sheeran's Loop Tour after Macklemore's onstage pro-Palestine statements during two performances in New Jersey. The removal came after pressure from pro-Israel advocacy groups and venue owners, including American businessman and venue owner Robert Kraft. On September 14, Macklemore and Kraft published statements on social media articulating their views on the matter, with a statement from Sheeran published the following day. By September 15, all the remaining opening acts for the tour—including Aaron Rowe, Finneas, and Lukas Graham, as well as Irish band Beoga—had withdrawn in solidarity with Macklemore and the Palestinian people.

== Background ==
Macklemore has expressed pro-Palestinian views during the Gaza war, including signing the Artists4Ceasefire open letter and saying that Israel is committing genocide in Gaza. In May 2024, he released "Hind's Hall", a protest song in support of the April 2024 Gaza solidarity protests at Columbia University and the "Hind's Hall" occupation of Hamilton Hall, renamed by protestors in honor of Hind Rajab, who was killed alongside members of her family by Israel Defense Forces soldiers in 2024. All profits from the song were donated to UNRWA. On August 24, 2026, Macklemore was confirmed as an opening act for Ed Sheeran's Loop Tour.

== Macklemore speeches ==
On September 4, 2026, while opening for Ed Sheeran at MetLife Stadium, Macklemore made a speech where he declared "Free Palestine". The statement was followed by a performance of "Hind's Hall". In his speech, he said, "The people all the way in Gaza to the occupied West Bank know that we have not forgotten about them. I say free Palestine. I say free Lebanon. Free Cuba to the Congo to Sudan to Iran".

After this, representatives for multiple NFL team and stadium owners contacted Sheeran's promoter Messina Touring Group with concerns about hate speech, specifically the phrase "Free Palestine" and the song "Hind's Hall"; they were told in response that Macklemore would not mention Palestine on stage again.

On the second night, Macklemore again declared "Free Palestine", and also addressed Jewish people in the audience, saying, "Criticism of Israel, criticism of apartheid, being against genocide, is in no way a criticism of you", adding that he wanted people in Gaza and the West Bank to know they had not been forgotten. He also criticized the United States Immigration and Customs Enforcement (ICE), saying, "free all people in America living in fear over this terrorist organization".

=== Removal of Macklemore ===
Gillette Stadium owner Robert Kraft (pictured in 2023)

On September 6, the Israeli-American Council petitioned for Ed Sheeran to remove Macklemore from his tour, stating on social media: "Ed Sheeran, do not allow your stage to be used to divide people or spread one-sided political propaganda!" The following day, Macklemore shared a video of his performance at the stadium with the caption: "Wanting all humans to be treated equal should never be controversial."

American singer Pink reshared a post from the pro-Israel group StopAntisemitism criticizing Macklemore for his speech. The post described Macklemore's "Free Palestine" message as "anti-Israel propaganda", accused him of falsely describing Israel's actions as genocide, and characterised his appearance in a keffiyeh as an affront to Jewish fans attending the concert. Following backlash over this repost, Pink responded on September 11 that she was "standing up for [her] own people", as Pink is Jewish. In response to Pink's actions regarding Macklemore's pro-Palestinian stance, a Change.org petition calling for her removal as a UNICEF ambassador had amassed more than 162,000 signatures by September 22. The petition's organizers said UNICEF ambassadors should meet the "highest standards of neutrality and compassion" when addressing the impact of conflict on children. Actor Javier Bardem shared multiple posts on Instagram in support of the petition.

The Combat Antisemitism Movement also pressured for his removal, citing a May 2014 concert where he dressed up as a character with a prosthetic nose, which critics described as a Jewish caricature; within days of the concert, Macklemore had apologized for wearing the costume and denied antisemitic intent.

Gillette Stadium owner Robert Kraft called Sheeran and told him during a 40-minute conversation that he, along with fellow NFL owners Arthur Blank, David Tepper, and Jeffrey Lurie, considered Macklemore's comments to be hate speech and would cancel shows at their venues were Macklemore to stay on the tour. On September 14, Messina Touring Group announced that Macklemore would no longer perform on the remaining U.S. dates, stating that several venues had refused to allow concerts to proceed with him on the lineup.

== Statements ==
=== Macklemore ===
On September 14, Macklemore announced his removal from the tour in an Instagram post nearly 1,000 words long. He said it came after a week of "difficult conversations" with Sheeran that ended "in a place of fundamental disagreement." In his statement, Macklemore said that he was not a victim, nor Sheeran or Pink, and that "The victims are the Palestinian people"." Macklemore said that Sheeran had told him Robert Kraft, whose Kraft Group owns Gillette Stadium, had barred him from performing there and persuaded other stadium owners to issue a similar ultimatum. Macklemore criticized Sheeran for not taking a stance on Gaza, writing: "Taking a side can cost you. Money, brand deals, sponsorships, festivals, private shows, relationships and access. I've lost all of those things. But there is no neutral position between the oppressor and the oppressed."

On September 16, Macklemore announced that he would donate $1 million, his entire net earnings from Sheeran's tour, to six organizations supporting Palestinians: the Palestine Children's Relief Fund, HEAL Palestine, Gaza Soup Kitchen, Medical Aid for Palestinians, American Near East Refugee Aid, and the UNRWA USA National Committee. He said he wanted to "bring the conversation back where it belongs," writing, "Whatever we disagree about, perhaps we can agree on this: Palestinian lives are worth protection. A Palestinian life is no less valuable than any life on this earth." Macklemore challenged Kraft to match the donation; later that day, Kraft announced a $2 million donation of his own without specifying the beneficiaries.

In his statement, Macklemore said he wanted to "center the parents carrying their children into hospitals without the basic resources to treat them, and the physicians, paramedics, journalists and aid workers who keep going back in," as well as "the organizers and activists who have paid real costs for standing with Palestine," whose risk he said was "of a far different order than mine." He described donating money as "one of the least costly forms of solidarity" available to him, saying he was doing so because the recipient organizations were "doing the work while much of the world debates it." Macklemore added that "aid alone cannot address the conditions that make it necessary," calling the situation in Gaza and the West Bank "a manmade injustice" requiring "immediate political change." He also referenced the death of 15-year-old Muhammad al-Zinati, whom was killed in an Israeli strike on September 15 while attempting to help an injured aid worker.

=== Robert Kraft ===
Hours after Macklemore's statement, Robert Kraft released a statement in which he spoke of his long fight against antisemitism, agreed with Macklemore on the suffering of the Palestinians, evoked the responsibility of Hamas, invited Macklemore to meet, and said they had "peace for all people" as a common goal.

Kraft argued that support for Palestinians "should not come at the expense of the Jewish community or obscure the responsibility of Hamas, a United States and globally … designated terrorist organization whose horrific actions have caused immeasurable suffering for Palestinians and Israelis alike." According to Adam Reilly, writing for WGBH, "Kraft did not dispute Macklemore's claims" and "seemed to allude to Macklemore's 2014 performance in a costume that was widely regarded as antisemitic in explaining Kraft's actions." Kraft's statement did not address whether or not he had lobbied other stadium owners.

The Washington Times reported that Kraft has donated tens of millions of dollars to organizations combating antisemitism, including more than $20 million to the "Stand Up to Jewish Hate" campaign. The outlet also noted that, separate from Macklemore's claim that Kraft organized a pressure campaign among venue owners, several venues independently notified the tour's promoter that they would not host a show with Macklemore on the bill, and that Kraft had not addressed whether he had personally organized that pressure.

=== Ed Sheeran ===
In a September 15 post on Instagram, Sheeran said he was appalled by the Israeli–Palestinian conflict describing it as a "human tragedy". He added that Macklemore's removal was "the promoter's decision, it was not mine," referring to Messina Touring Group. Sheeran added: "I choose to use my fame and platform to be a place of safety and sanctuary, to maintain diplomacy and keep conversations open, not closed".

Sheeran also said that he was not complicit, that he has his own personal views, that not expressing them doesn't mean he doesn't have them; nor doesn't care or doesn't support causes in his own way.

==== September 19 ====
On September 19 at the Philadelphia stop on his tour, Sheeran described it as "one of the worst weeks of his life", and "you really find out who your friends are". He added "But the root of it is love. And if this tour ends, love doesn't win. Love doesn't win. You know? I can't let you guys down. That's why I'm here tonight, on my own, for you guys."

Sheeran also talked about the issues for which Macklemore was removed for speaking about: "... this is a humanitarian issue and I cannot hide how I feel about it anymore." He said what happened in Israel on October 7 was "horrific and compounded centuries of Jewish pain" and what was happening in Gaza was "catastrophic and unjustifiable and disproportionate", mentioning the scale of devastation and loss of civilian lives, of children's lives; and systemic injustice in the West Bank. He also said he was "deeply worried" by the idea that venues would "pre-approve" content or performers.

=== Other opening acts ===
On September 15, following Sheeran's statement, all remaining opening acts, including Finneas O'Connell, Aaron Rowe, and Lukas Graham, and Sheeran's backing band Beoga, dropped out. Finneas said he was withdrawing because he believed artists should not be silenced for speaking in support of oppressed people and expressed support for Palestinians. Both Beoga and Rowe cited Irish history in their withdrawal statements, with the former stating that they were "Irish people who understand colonialism" while the latter stated that as "Irish people we know all too well about genocide, forced famine and violent occupation." Rowe and Graham both described their withdrawal as a difficult decision and expressed gratitude to Sheeran. Several acts who had opened for Sheeran prior to Macklemore's opening at MetLife Stadium, including Myles Smith, Amble and BIIRD, have come out with support for Macklemore and the people of Palestine.

Rowe made an additional statement on the 19th, stating that criticism was being wrongly directed at Sheeran instead of Kraft.

== Impacts ==
In the days following the controversy, streams of Macklemore, Aaron Rowe, and Beoga's music significantly increased. Streaming numbers of Sheeran's music did not significantly change. Gazan artists Anne Redwan and Qusai al-Helo painted a mural of Macklemore on a destroyed building in Gaza City.

=== Guitar Center contest ===
On September 14, American musical instrument retailer Guitar Center launched their "Open for Legends" series of contests, with the first edition allowing the winner to open for Sheeran during his Mexico City stop on December 11. The promotion received increased attention as a result of the controversy, with submissions mostly consisting of memes and non-musical videos criticising Macklemore's removal and the subsequent withdrawal of the other openers for the tour whilst supporting Palestine. Such videos were removed by Guitar Center, leaving only valid entries to the contest. The contest was also criticized for the date which it was planned to end, October 7, which coincides with the October 7 attacks.

=== Gillette Stadium concerts ===
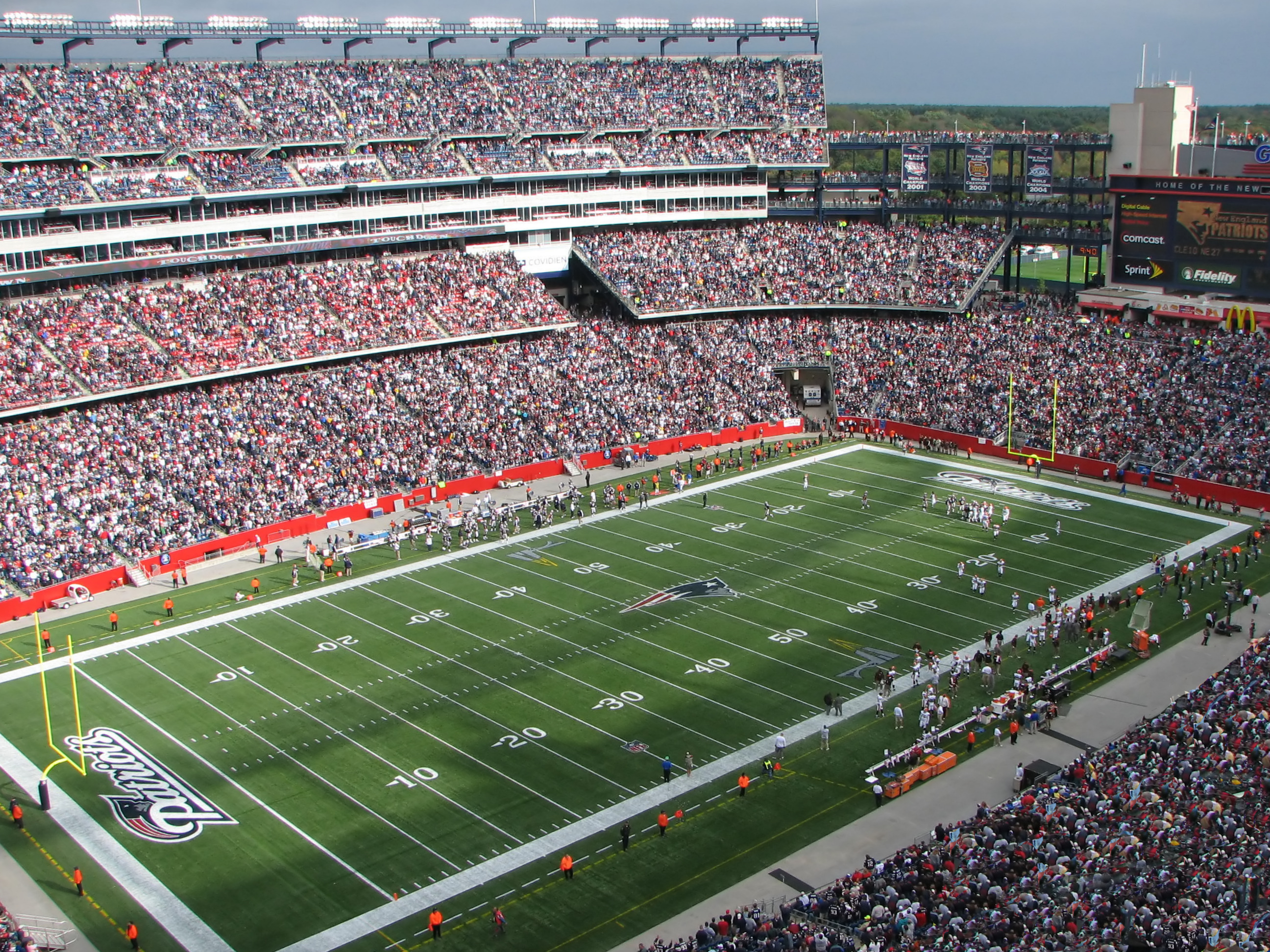
Gillette Stadium, owned by Robert Kraft's Kraft Group

Ed Sheeran's performances at Kraft's Gillette Stadium on September 25 and 26 were coincidentally cancelled due to a forecast Nor'easter bringing heavy rain and strong wind.

At his October 2 and 3 performances at Gillette Stadium, Zach Bryan wore a t-shirt which had "Free Palestine", a pine tree, and "An appeal to heaven" on it. Members of his band wore pro-Palestine shirts. The Boston Herald interpreted the shirt as a protest against Kraft.

=== Free Palestine Tour ===
On September 24, Macklemore announced the Free Palestine Tour, with proceeds donated to organizations including Anera, Gaza Soup Kitchen, Medical Aid for Palestinians, Palestinian Youth Movement, Heal Palestine, Palestine Children's Relief Fund, Jewish Voices for Peace, and UNRWA. The tour ran three shows in Dublin, Paris, and London in October 2026. Hozier, Kneecap, and Beoga performed alongside Macklemore at the Dublin show. Macklemore stated in November 2026 that the tour did not have stops in the United States because nine major arenas, including New York City's Madison Square Garden and Barclays Center, Crypto.com Arena in Los Angeles and Climate Pledge Arena in his home town of Seattle, turned him down when he said that the dates would be for the Free Palestine Tour.

=== Replacement acts ===
During the Loop Tour's stop at Mercedes-Benz Stadium in Atlanta on October 3, Sheeran brought on former The Fray frontman Isaac Slade to perform a two-song set as a special guest opening act. During his performance, Slade brought up the conflict in Gaza, stating that people needed to find "common ground" regarding it. Slade had performed as a special guest during the Toronto leg of the tour in August. On October 8, Slade confirmed that he would be an opening act for four additional stops on the tour in North America, while American Idol Season 24 contestant Brooks Rosser announced that he would open for the October 10 date at Lucas Oil Stadium in Indianapolis alongside Slade; Slade would later be confirmed as an opener for the entire Latin America portion of the tour on November 4. Zach Hood and Rome Ramirez would also be announced as opening acts with Slade, the former for the October 17 date at Bank of America Stadium in Charlotte and the latter for both the October 24 leg at AT&T Stadium in Arlington and the November 7 leg at Raymond James Stadium in Tampa. As previously mentioned, the winner of the Guitar Center "Open for Legends" contest will open the December 11 date in Mexico City alongside Slade.

== Response ==
=== Palestine advocacy groups ===
In a statement to Al Jazeera, Radhika Sainath, litigation director of Palestine Legal, said that Sheeran would probably have been able to sue for damages if he had supported Macklemore and the tour had been subsequently cancelled.

The Boycott, Divestment and Sanctions movement called on Sheeran to cancel the remaining dates in his US tour.

=== Media ===
Irish radio station Classic Hits Radio halted broadcasting songs by Sheeran for the "foreseeable future". Malaysian radio station Fly FM stopped broadcasting Sheeran's music, saying that "some things matter more than music".

BBC journalist Mark Savage described it as the biggest controversy of Sheeran's career. Music journalist Jeffrey Ingold, in an interview with BBC Radio 5 Live, commented on the situation, stating that Sheeran's apparent acceptance of the decision to remove Macklemore felt like "cowardice" that would impact people's opinion of Sheeran.

For Philissa Cramer in Haaretz, the controversy "reveals something new about the state of play," noting that "[Kraft] meets Macklemore on pro-Palestinian terms." Cramer sees the ordeal as evidence of how "American Jewish supporters of Israel are incorporating, rather than rejecting, the growing legitimacy of Palestinian identification even while remaining fearful about their own place in the discourse."

Laura Snapes, writing for The Guardian, criticised what appeared to be "billionaires crushing free speech", describing Sheeran as somewhere between a "corporate shill" and "wilfully naive". Kaivan Shroff, writing for Zeteo, called Sheeran's remarks "tepid and defensive" and said that he was not staying out of politics but rather "letting a pro-Israel billionaire choose his politics for him." Natasha Lennard, writing in The Intercept, described Sheeran's professed neutrality as "craven".

Manya Brachear Pashman, managing editor of the Jewish news organization The Forward, published a story comparing the cancellation of Macklemore's participation to the continued sold-out performances of Kanye West—who has "spewed explicit anti-Jewish slurs" and made a song called "Heil Hitler"—asking: "is hating Jews more acceptable than hating Israel?" Natasha Lennard, writing for The Intercept, also made the comparison, commenting that the cancellation of Macklemore was motivated by a desire to censor criticism of Israel and conflate it with antisemitism.

Kenan Malik, a columnist for The Observer described the situation as cancel culture. He also noted the close ties between Kraft and Benjamin Netanyahu.

=== Public figures ===
==== In support of Macklemore ====
Colin Kaepernick, a former National Football League player known for kneeling during the US national anthem in protest of systemic racism in the US, said NFL owners "are openly colluding" against Macklemore. He made parallels between his own cancellation for protesting police violence, and Macklemore's.

Abdullah Hammoud, the mayor of Dearborn, Michigan, which is home to one of the largest Arab communities in the United States, invited Macklemore to perform at a concert sponsored by the city.

Children's advocate and entertainer Ms. Rachel wrote: "Imagine being a Palestinian kid and seeing [Sheeran] did a concert for Ukraine but when over 20,000 Palestinian children are killed he's silent", adding that Sheeran "is making a political statement to his fans when he does a concert to support Ukraine, but considers Palestine too dangerous and political." On September 17, following Macklemore's own $1 million pledge, Ms. Rachel announced she would match his donation to the Palestine Children's Relief Fund, writing on Instagram, "I invite every wealthy white celebrity to match it and speak out against the genocide in Gaza."

British racing driver Lewis Hamilton praised Macklemore's response on Instagram and expressed support for him, stating: "Thank you for using your voice, standing with you." All members of the Los Angeles-based girl group Katseye who collaborated with Sheeran prior to the controversy, also later reportedly unfollowed him on Instagram. Billy Bragg stated "What the owner of the Gillette Stadium, Robert Kraft, [is doing] in refusing to allow Macklemore to play at his stadium because he said 'Free Palestine', is he's trying to intimidate an artist into silence. That seldom works." Climate activist Greta Thunberg also expressed solidarity with Macklemore and the Palestinian people following his removal from the tour. Singer Jack Antonoff criticized Sheeran's response stating that he "missed a massive, beautiful opportunity" to support free speech.

==== Against Macklemore ====
Jonathan Greenblatt of the Anti-Defamation League wrote: "Glad to see Macklemore off Ed Sheeran's tour ... For years, Macklemore has pushed antisemitic tropes and demonized Israel and Israelis. Now he certainly has the First Amendment right to speak out and express his views, but demonizing Jews and Israelis shouldn't be rewarded."

Far-right political activist Tommy Robinson expressed support for Sheeran, as did British singer Boy George, who had recently released the pro-Israel song "We Will Dance Again".

Commentator Bill Maher strongly criticized Macklemore's statements, also citing the May 2014 costume incident.

== In popular culture ==
- In the South Park episode "Billionaire Weenietown", the show referenced a public dispute between Macklemore and a billionaire character modeled after New England Patriots owner Robert Kraft.
- Following Macklemore's removal from the tour, Palestinian artists Anne Redwan and Qusai al-Helo painted a mural of the rapper on a damaged building in Gaza City in recognition of his public advocacy.

== See also ==
- Palestine exception
