= Magnetic north (disambiguation) =

Magnetic north is the direction in which a compass needle points; see Magnetic declination and North magnetic pole.

Magnetic north may also refer to:

- Magnetic North (Less Than Jake song), 2000
- Magnetic North (Hopesfall album), 2007
- Magnetic North (Aqualung album), 2010
- Magnetic North (Iain Archer album), 2006
- The Magnetic North, a British band
- Magnetic North Orchestra, a Norwegian jazz orchestra
- Magnetic North Theatre Festival in Canada
- An arc of Ultimate X-Men written by Brian K. Vaughan
