= Hey Ma (Aaron Rowe song) =

Single by Aaron Rowe

from the EP Exodus
- Released: 23 May 2025
- Genre: Folk
- Length: 4:00
- Label: Columbia
- Songwriters: Aaron Rowe; Iain Archer

Aaron Rowe singles chronology
"Hey Ma" (2025)	"Talking with You" (2025)

Music video
- "Hey Ma" on YouTube

"Hey Ma" is the debut single by Irish singer-songwriter Aaron Rowe, released on 23 May 2025 through Columbia Records as the lead single from his debut extended play, Exodus (2025). Written by Rowe alongside Iain Archer, the song is dedicated to Rowe's mother and his roots from Monkstown Farm in Dublin, and reflects themes of distance, identity, and familial love.

== Critical reception ==
Robin Murray of Clash declared the song "an absolute knockout – a song that feels familiar to you from first note to last, Aaron Rowe nonetheless makes it feel fresh."

Thomas Bedward of Broken 8 Magazine also dubbed the single "a knockout", saying, "It immediately feels both fresh and familiar, a testament to Rowe's ability to imbue classic sounds with his own unique flavour. While it possesses folk characteristics with its acoustic guitar and floating fiddle line, it steers clear of traditionalism, instead offering a deeply personal narrative."

FrontView Magazine said that "Hey Ma" "[felt] both intimate and expansive. As the track builds to its emotional peak, Rowe abandons melody for raw vocal runs that are both mesmerizing and devastating. It is a performance that doesn't merely sing pain, but inhabits it."

== Credits and personnel ==
Adapted from Tidal.

- Aaron Rowe – writing, vocals
- Iain Archer – writing
