= The Place We Ran From =

Studio album by Tired Pony
- Released: June 5, 2010
- Recorded: January 5–12, 2010, at Type Foundry, Portland, Oregon, United States; with Tom Smith, Betsey Lee, and Esme Lee recorded in the Santa Monica Mountains and Zooey Deschanel recorded at East West, Hollywood, California, United States
- Genres: Indie folk, alternative country, alternative rock
- Length: 45:29
- Labels: Mom + Pop Music, Fiction Records/Polydor Records
- Producer: Jacknife Lee

Tired Pony chronology
The Place We Ran From (2010)	The Ghost of the Mountain (2013)

Singles from The Place We Ran From
- 1. "Dead American Writers" Released: 2010; 2. "Get on the Road" Released: 2010 (promo)

The Place We Ran From is the debut album by the alternative rock/alt country supergroup Tired Pony, released on July 5, 2010, through Polydor/Fiction in the United Kingdom and on July 28, 2010, in the United States by Mom and Pop. The album grew from what was initially a solo project for Snow Patrol songwriter Gary Lightbody which rapidly became a collaboration with members of Belle and Sebastian, R.E.M., and producer Jacknife Lee joining as well as contributions from actress and singer Zooey Deschanel, guitarist M. Ward, and Tom Smith of the indie rock group Editors. The tracks were recorded over the course of one week in January 2010, in Portland, Oregon. The album was recorded over the course of one week in January 2010 and charted in over a half dozen countries.

== Recording ==
Lightbody had a "long-term ambition" of making a country album and revealed the project's existence in May 2009. In the interview, he expressed his love for country music, which he said he had loved for a long time: "I always thought I had a country album in me and it turns out I did." The rest of Snow Patrol expressed excitement for their band-mate, "delighted that [Lightbody was] getting to exercise all his crazy ideas." In October 2009, Lightbody in his blog on Snow Patrol's website revealed the members of the group to be Richard Colburn (of Belle & Sebastian), Iain Archer, singer Miriam Kaufmann (Archer's wife), and Jacknife Lee. He talked about two more members whom he was very excited about, but didn't name them. He also stated that the album won't be country as was being reported, but would be "country-tinged". In January 2010, Hot Press reported Peter Buck (of R.E.M.) to be a member of the group. Lightbody described Buck as one of his "all-time heroes" and admired his talent for playing a variety of instruments.

== Promotion ==
The lead single from The Place We Ran From was "Dead American Writers", released one week prior on Compact Disc and 7". A music video was directed by Paul Fraser featuring Joseph Gilgun lip syncing the lyrics. "Dead American Writers" includes "I Finally Love This Town" as a B-side; the song was later made available through the band's site as a free download. "Get on the Road" was released as a promotional single with an instrumental version of the track as its B-side.

The band also toured through summer and autumn of 2010.

== Reception ==
=== Critical reception ===
Professional ratings
Aggregate scores
Source	Rating
Metacritic	68/100
Review scores
Source	Rating
Allmusic	2.5/5 stars
The Guardian	3/5 stars
Rolling Stone	3/5 stars
Uncut	4/5 stars

Rolling Stone gave the album a rating of three stars out of five.

=== Charting ===
Chart (2010)	Peak
Belgium Album Chart	24
Billboard 200	191
Dutch Album Chart	14
Irish Album Chart	27
Top Heatseekers	8
Top Independent Albums	33
UK Albums Chart	17

== Track listing ==
All songs written by Tired Pony

1. "Northwestern Skies" – 3:49
2. "Get on the Road" – 4:45
3. "Point Me at Lost Islands" – 3:11
4. "Dead American Writers" – 2:34
5. "Held in the Arms of Your Words" – 6:40
6. "That Silver Necklace" – 3:49
7. "I Am a Landslide" – 5:43
8. "The Deepest Ocean There Is" – 4:58
9. "The Good Book" – 3:04
10. "Pieces" – 6:56

American iTunes Store pre-order bonus track

11. "In the Stockade"

Japanese edition bonus track

11. "I Finally Love This Town" – 4:58

Compact Disc + MP3 download bonus tracks

11. "In the Stockade"
12. "Your Bible"

== Release history ==
Region	Date	Label	Format	Catalog
United Kingdom	June 5, 2010	Polydor/Fiction	Digital download	—
United Kingdom	July 11, 2010	Polydor/Fiction	Compact Disc	6 02527 42262 6
United Kingdom	July 11, 2010	Polydor/Fiction	LP	6 02527 46636 1
United States	September 28, 2010	Mom and Pop	Compact Disc + MP3	8 58275 00182 2

== Personnel ==
Tired Pony

- Iain Archer – banjo, dobro, acoustic and electric guitar, harpsichord, percussion, vibraphone, vocals on "I Am A Landslide", vocal harmony, backing vocals, composition
- Peter Buck – banjo; feedback; glockenspiel; 12-string, acoustic, baritone, electric, and Nashville guitars; mandolin, noise, percussion, composition
- Richard Colburn – drums, electric guitar, percussion, typewriter, composition
- Jacknife Lee – 12-string acoustic and electric guitars, harpsichord, melodica, organ, pump organ, percussion, piano, vibraphone, composition, engineering, mixing, production
- Gary Lightbody – acoustic and electric guitars, pump organ, percussion, vibraphone, vocals, composition
- Scott McCaughey – banjo, bass guitar, harmonica, fuzz bass, baritone and electric guitars, percussion, piano, vibraphone, vocal harmony, backing vocals, Wurlitzer, composition
- Troy Stewart – bass guitar, dobro, acoustic and electric guitars, percussion, piano, harmony vocal, composition

Additional musicians

- Paul Brainard – pedal steel
- Fred Chalenor – upright bass
- Zooey Deschanel – vocals on "Get on the Road" and "Point Me to Lost Islands"
- Betsy Lee – vocals
- Esme Lee – vocals
- Chris McCormack – electric guitar
- Ellen Osborn – vocals
- Anna Shelton – bowed saw
- Tom Smith – vocals on "The Good Book"
- Annalisa Tornfelt – fiddle, violin
- Alex Valdivieso – backing vocals
- M. Ward – electric guitar and harmony vocal

Technical personnel

- Sam Bell – engineering, mixing
- Vivian Johnson – photography
- Dan Kaufmann – design
- Jason Powers – assistant
- Adam Selzer – assistant
- Nigel Walton – mastering at the Edit Suite, London, England, United Kingdom
