= Broken (Jake Bugg song) =

Single by Jake Bugg

from the album Jake Bugg
- Released: 21 June 2013
- Recorded: 2011
- Genre: Indie folk
- Length: 4:07
- Label: Mercury
- Songwriter(s): Jake Bugg, Crispin Hunt
- Producer(s): Crispin Hunt (album version); Rick Rubin (single version)

Jake Bugg singles chronology
| "Seen It All" (2013) | "Broken" (2013) | "What Doesn't Kill You" (2013) |

"Broken" is a song by British singer-songwriter Jake Bugg. It was released as the seventh and final single from his self-titled debut album (2012). It was released as a digital download in the United Kingdom on 21 June 2013. The song peaked at number 44 on the UK Singles Chart.

== Background ==
There are two versions of the song: the original which featured on Jake Bugg's debut album, and a re-recording which is not on the album but was released as an official single in 2013. The former was written by Jake Bugg and Crispin Hunt, with Hunt also handling production duties. In early 2013, Jake Bugg worked with producer Rick Rubin on a new version of "Broken" to be released as the final single from his debut album. The new version, recorded at Rubin's Shangri La Studios in Malibu, California, featured drumming by Chad Smith of the Red Hot Chili Peppers. The song was written about his Glaswegian love interest Abigail Carter. The recording sessions at Shangri La Studios inspired the title of Jake Bugg's second album, where much of it was also recorded with Rick Rubin.

== Music video ==
A music video to accompany the release of "Broken" was first released onto YouTube on 20 June 2013 at a total length of five minutes and thirteen seconds.

== Track listings ==
Digital download
| No. | Title | Length |
|---|---|---|
| 1. | "Broken" | 4:07 |

== Chart performance ==
| Chart (2012) | Peak position |
|---|---|
| Australia (ARIA Hitseekers) | 5 |
| Belgium (Ultratip Bubbling Under Flanders) | 62 |
| Ireland (IRMA) | 20 |
| New Zealand (Recorded Music NZ) | 20 |
| Scotland (OCC) | 40 |
| UK Singles (Official Charts Company) | 44 |

== Certifications ==
| Region | Certification | Certified units/sales |
|---|---|---|
| United Kingdom (BPI) | Silver | 200,000^{‡} |
^{‡} Sales+streaming figures based on certification alone.

== Release history ==
| Region | Date | Format | Label |
|---|---|---|---|
| United Kingdom | 21 June 2013 | Digital download | Mercury Records |
