= Seen It All (Jake Bugg song) =

Single by Jake Bugg

from the album Jake Bugg
- Released: 25 February 2013
- Recorded: 2011
- Genre: Folk rock; rock
- Length: 2:51
- Label: Mercury Records
- Songwriter(s): Iain Archer, Jake Bugg
- Producer(s): Mike Crossey

Jake Bugg singles chronology
"Two Fingers" (2012)	"Seen It All" (2013)	"Broken" (2013)

"Seen It All" is a song by British singer songwriter Jake Bugg. It was released as the sixth single from his self-titled debut album (2012). It was released as a digital download in the United Kingdom on 25 February 2013. The song has peaked at number 61 on the UK Singles Chart. The song features drumming from young musician Chris "Bodge" Dunkley, who had made a name for himself on the Hexham jazz scene. The song also features in the TV series Alex Rider, when sung by the title character during two interrogation scenes.

== Music video ==
A music video to accompany the release of "Seen It All" was first released onto YouTube on 24 February 2013 at a total length of three minutes. The video features English actor Michael Socha. The video was filmed in various locations around Glasgow, including the Glasgow University Union and local beverage connoisseur Ciaran Anderson's flat.

== Track listings ==
Digital download
No.	Title	Length
1.	"Seen It All"	2:51

== Charts ==
Chart (2012)	Peak position
UK Singles (OCC)	61

== Certifications ==
Region	Certification	Certified units/sales
United Kingdom (BPI)	Silver	200,000^{‡}
^{‡} Sales+streaming figures based on certification alone.

== Release history ==
Region	Date	Format	Label
United Kingdom	25 February 2013	Digital download	Mercury Records
