= Loop Tour =

2026 concert tour by Ed Sheeran

- Tour by Ed Sheeran
- Promotional poster for the Oceania concerts.
- Location: North America; Oceania; South America
- Associated album: Play
- Start date: 16 January 2026
- End date: 11 December 2026
- No. of shows: 56
- Supporting acts: Aaron Rowe; Amble; BIIRD; Christian Meier; Dicapo; Ellie Banke; Honahlei; Isaac Slade; Lukas Graham; Macklemore; Mark Ambor; Mia Wray; Myles Smith; Sigrid; Vance Joy
- Attendance: 1,028,641 (27 shows)
- Box office: $129,456,996 (27 shows)

Ed Sheeran concert chronology
- +−=÷× Tour (2022–2025); Loop Tour (2026)

The Loop Tour is the sixth concert tour by the English singer-songwriter Ed Sheeran, in support of his eighth studio album, Play (2025). The tour began on 16 January 2026 in Auckland, and is set to conclude in Mexico City, on 11 December 2026.

== Background and development ==
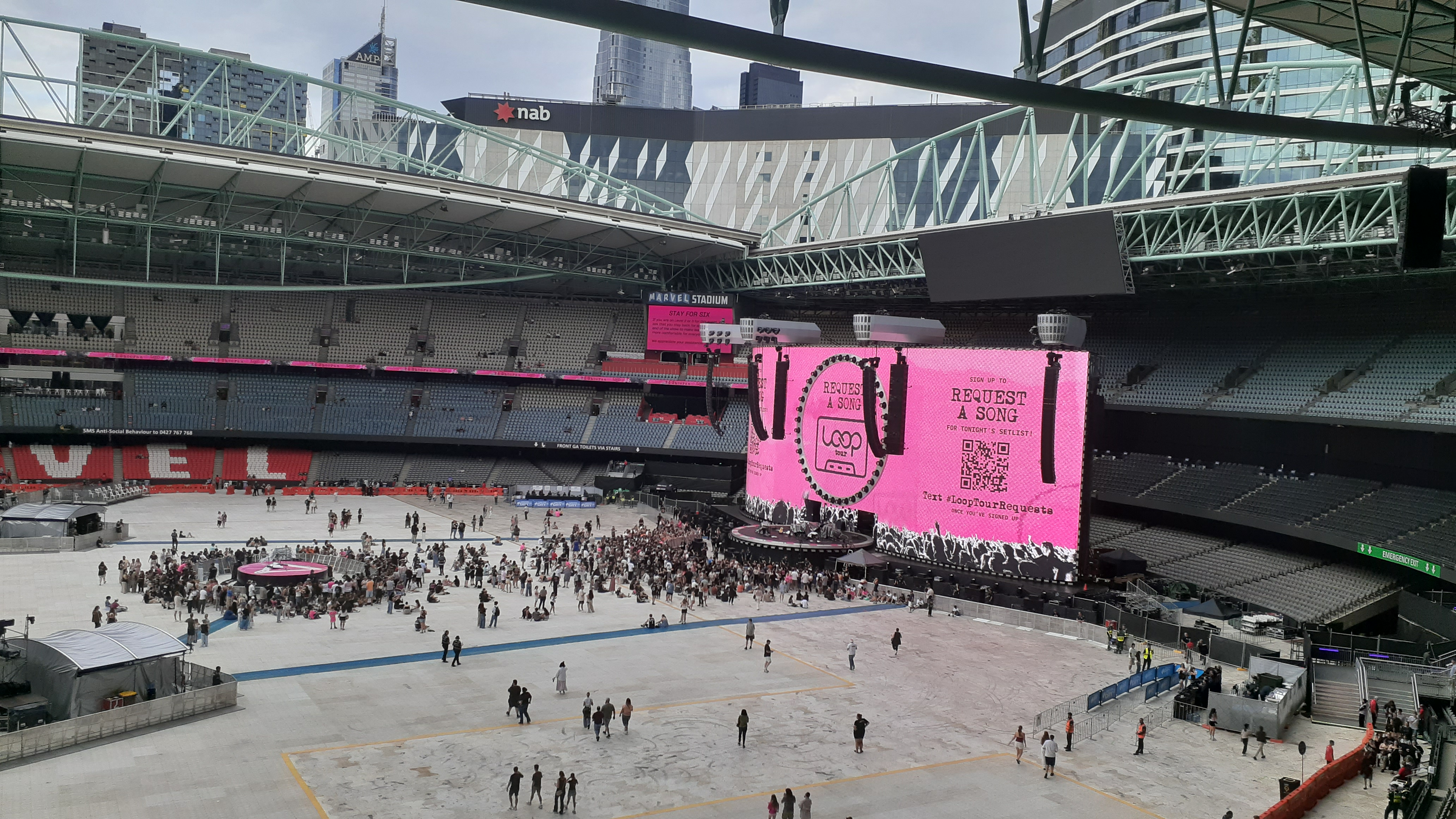
The stage for the tour, pictured in Melbourne, features a B-stage for intimate performances. During the pre-show, the screen shows a QR code for fans to submit requests.

On 22 July 2025, Sheeran announced an eleven-date Oceanian tour. On 28 July, he announced an additional four shows in Australia due to overwhelming demand, bringing the overall number of shows to fifteen. Before the tour's commencement, Sheeran performed a five-date arena tour across Europe to promote the album.

On 18 September he announced a 26-date North American tour. In October 2025, Sheeran announced the first set of Latin American concerts for May 2026, and in April 2026 he revealed a second leg scheduled for November and December 2026. As of April 2026, the tour comprises 57 concerts in total, including 17 dates in Oceania, 13 in Latin America, and 27 in North America. The tour promoter is Messina Touring Group.

During the pre-show, the video screens display a QR code for fans to request tracks Sheeran would later perform in the show. Starting from the first concert in North America on 13 June, Irish folk band Beoga performed with Sheeran for two of the show's five segments, until 5 September.

== Controversy ==
Macklemore was one of the opening acts at the MetLife Stadium performances in September 2026. During his set, he performed his song "Hind's Hall" and called for a "Free Palestine", noting his opposition to the ongoing Gaza genocide. His remarks prompted the Israeli-American Council to petition for his removal from the tour. Later that month, tour promoter Messina Touring Group announced that Macklemore would no longer perform on the remaining U.S. dates, stating that several venues had refused to allow concerts to proceed with him on the lineup.

Sheeran issued a statement emphasizing that the decision to remove Macklemore was made by Messina, not him. Macklemore said that Sheeran had told him that Robert Kraft, whose Kraft Group owns Gillette Stadium, had barred him from performing there and persuaded other stadium owners to issue a similar ultimatum. (Note: The concerts at Gillette Stadium were ultimately canceled due to weather concerns.)

Aaron Rowe, Finneas, and Lukas Graham, all the remaining opening acts for the tour, as well as Irish band Beoga, who had joined as his backing band for a segment of the show, announced on 15 September 2026 that they were dropping out of the remaining tour dates in solidarity. Several acts who had opened for Sheeran prior to Macklemore's opening at MetLife Stadium, including Myles Smith, Amble, and BIIRD, have come out with support for Macklemore and the people of Palestine.

== Set list ==
The following set list is from the 16 January 2026 show in Auckland, New Zealand. It is not intended to represent a majority of the performances throughout the tour.

Main stage

1. "You Need Me, I Don't Need You"
2. "Sapphire"
3. "Castle on the Hill"
4. "The A Team"
5. "Shivers"
6. "Don't"
7. "Eyes Closed"

Fan suggestions (B-stage)

8. "Little Bird"
9. "Sofa"
10. "Tenerife Sea"
11. "Supermarket Flowers"
12. "Give Me Love"

Main stage with the band

13. "Galway Girl"
14. "Nancy Mulligan"
15. "I Don't Care"
16. "Old Phone"
17. "Heaven"
18. "Camera"
19. "Celestial"
20. "Photograph"

B-stage

21. "Eastside" / "2002" / "Cold Water" / "Little Things" / "Love Yourself" (medley)
22. "Thinking Out Loud"
23. "Perfect"
24. "I See Fire"

Main stage

25. "Symmetry"
26. "Bloodstream"
27. "Afterglow"

Encore

28. "Shape of You"
29. "Azizam"
30. "Bad Habits"

=== Notes ===
- During the concert in San Juan on 14 May 2026, Puerto Rican singer Daddy Yankee joined Sheeran onstage to perform "Sonríele" and "BZRP Music Sessions, Vol. 0/66".

== Tour dates ==
List of 2026 concerts
Date (2026)	City	Country	Venue	Opening act(s)	Attendance	Revenue
16 January	Auckland	New Zealand	Go Media Stadium	Vance Joy; Mia Wray; BIIRD	55,959 / 55,959	$5,831,661
17 January	Auckland	New Zealand	Go Media Stadium	Vance Joy; Mia Wray; BIIRD	55,959 / 55,959	$5,831,661
21 January	Wellington	New Zealand	Sky Stadium	Vance Joy; Mia Wray; BIIRD	33,990 / 33,990	$3,350,389
24 January	Christchurch	New Zealand	Apollo Projects Stadium	Vance Joy; Mia Wray; BIIRD	44,378 / 44,378	$4,707,933
25 January	Christchurch	New Zealand	Apollo Projects Stadium	Vance Joy; Mia Wray; BIIRD	44,378 / 44,378	$4,707,933
31 January	Perth	Australia	Optus Stadium	Vance Joy; Mia Wray; BIIRD	87,812 / 87,812	$11,979,504
1 February	Perth	Australia	Optus Stadium	Vance Joy; Mia Wray; BIIRD	87,812 / 87,812	$11,979,504
13 February	Sydney	Australia	Accor Stadium	Vance Joy; Mia Wray; Aaron Rowe	192,181 / 192,181	$26,145,204
14 February	Sydney	Australia	Accor Stadium	Vance Joy; Mia Wray; Aaron Rowe	192,181 / 192,181	$26,145,204
15 February	Sydney	Australia	Accor Stadium	Vance Joy; Mia Wray; Aaron Rowe	192,181 / 192,181	$26,145,204
20 February	Brisbane	Australia	Suncorp Stadium	Vance Joy; Mia Wray; Aaron Rowe	116,273 / 116,273	$15,271,230
21 February	Brisbane	Australia	Suncorp Stadium	Vance Joy; Mia Wray; Aaron Rowe	116,273 / 116,273	$15,271,230
22 February	Brisbane	Australia	Suncorp Stadium	Vance Joy; Mia Wray; Aaron Rowe	116,273 / 116,273	$15,271,230
26 February	Melbourne	Australia	Marvel Stadium	Vance Joy; Mia Wray; Aaron Rowe	173,387 / 173,387	$24,831,251
27 February	Melbourne	Australia	Marvel Stadium	Vance Joy; Mia Wray; Aaron Rowe	173,387 / 173,387	$24,831,251
28 February	Melbourne	Australia	Marvel Stadium	Vance Joy; Mia Wray; Aaron Rowe	173,387 / 173,387	$24,831,251
5 March	Adelaide	Australia	Adelaide Oval	Vance Joy; Mia Wray; Aaron Rowe	50,070 / 50,070	$6,954,686
9 May	Santo Domingo	Dominican Republic	Estadio Quisqueya Juan Marichal	—N/a	13,609 / 14,288	$1,014,114
13 May	San Juan	Puerto Rico	José Miguel Agrelot Coliseum	—N/a	13,350 / 13,350	$1,701,042
16 May	Bogotá	Colombia	Vive Claro	—N/a	20,149 / 20,698	$2,168,332
20 May	Lima	Peru	Estadio Nacional del Perú	Christian Meier	23,388 / 27,822	$1,696,682
23 May	Quito	Ecuador	Atahualpa Olympic Stadium	Dicapo	23,402 / 25,562	$2,330,291
27 May	Guatemala City	Guatemala	Cementos Progreso Stadium	—N/a	14,292 / 18,612	$2,016,085
30 May	San José	Costa Rica	Estadio Nacional de Costa Rica	Honahlei	19,401 / 21,376	$2,008,592
13 June	Glendale	United States	State Farm Stadium	Mark Ambor; Amble; Aaron Rowe	—	—
20 June	Nashville	United States	Nissan Stadium	Myles Smith; Amble; Aaron Rowe	—	—
25 June (Note: The 25 June 2026 concert is part of Summerfest.)	Milwaukee	United States	American Family Insurance Amphitheater	Aaron Rowe	—	—
27 June	Chicago	United States	Soldier Field	Myles Smith; Ellie Banke	—	—
4 July	Denver	United States	Empower Field at Mile High	Myles Smith; Aaron Rowe	—	—
18 July	Las Vegas (Note: Technically in Paradise, in the Las Vegas Valley.)	United States	Allegiant Stadium	Myles Smith; Sigrid; Aaron Rowe	—	—
21 July	San Diego	United States	Petco Park	Myles Smith; Sigrid; Aaron Rowe	—	—
25 July	Santa Clara	United States	Levi's Stadium	Myles Smith; Sigrid; Aaron Rowe	—	—
1 August	Seattle	United States	Lumen Field	Myles Smith; Sigrid; Aaron Rowe	—	—
8 August	Los Angeles (Note: Technically in Inglewood, part of Greater Los Angeles.)	United States	SoFi Stadium	Myles Smith; Sigrid; Aaron Rowe	—	—
15 August	Minneapolis	United States	U.S. Bank Stadium	Myles Smith; Lukas Graham; Ellie Banke	—	—
20 August	Toronto	Canada	Rogers Centre	Myles Smith; Lukas Graham; BIIRD	—	—
21 August	Toronto	Canada	Rogers Centre	Myles Smith; Lukas Graham; BIIRD	—	—
22 August	Toronto	Canada	Rogers Centre	Myles Smith; Lukas Graham; BIIRD	—	—
29 August	Detroit	United States	Ford Field	Myles Smith; Lukas Graham; BIIRD	—	—
4 September	East Rutherford	United States	MetLife Stadium	Macklemore; Lukas Graham; BIIRD	100,000	$12,000,000
5 September	East Rutherford	United States	MetLife Stadium	Macklemore; Lukas Graham; BIIRD	100,000	$12,000,000
19 September	Philadelphia	United States	Lincoln Financial Field	—N/a (Note: All of the opening acts for the rest of the tour cancelled their sets following the Macklemore controversy.)	47,000	$5,900,000
3 October	Atlanta	United States	Mercedes-Benz Stadium	Isaac Slade	—	—
10 October	Indianapolis	United States	Lucas Oil Stadium	Isaac Slade; Brooks Rosser	—	—
17 October	Charlotte	United States	Bank of America Stadium	Isaac Slade; Zach Hood	—	—
24 October	Arlington	United States	AT&T Stadium	Isaac Slade; Rome Ramirez	—	—
29 October	Hollywood	United States	Hard Rock Live	—N/a	—	—
30 October	Hollywood	United States	Hard Rock Live	—N/a	—	—
7 November	Tampa	United States	Raymond James Stadium	Isaac Slade; Rome Ramirez	—	—
21 November	Santiago	Chile	Estadio Bicentenario de La Florida	Isaac Slade; Diego Ellwanger	—	—
22 November	Santiago	Chile	Estadio Bicentenario de La Florida	Isaac Slade; Diego Ellwanger	—	—
26 November	Asunción	Paraguay	Jockey Club	Mavi	—	—
29 November	Buenos Aires	Argentina	Estadio Tomás Adolfo Ducó	Isaac Slade; Ambik	—	—
5 December	São Paulo	Brazil	Nubank Parque	Isaac Slade	—	—
6 December	São Paulo	Brazil	Nubank Parque	Isaac Slade	—	—
11 December	Mexico City	Mexico	Estadio Ciudad de los Deportes	—N/a	—	—
Total					1,028,641 / 1,042,758	$129,456,996

== Cancelled shows ==
List of cancelled concerts, showing date, city, country, venue, and reason for cancellation
Date (2026)	City	Country	Venue	Reason
25 September	Foxborough	United States	Gillette Stadium	Nor'easter
26 September	Foxborough	United States	Gillette Stadium	Nor'easter
12 December	Mexico City	Mexico	Estadio Ciudad de los Deportes	Merged into the 11 December date due to city-wide mobility complications during the Our Lady of Guadalupe celebrations.

== See also ==
- List of Billboard Boxscore number-one concert series of the 2020s
