= Exodus (Aaron Rowe EP) =

EP by Aaron Rowe
- Released: 12 September 2025
- Length: 18:32
- Label: Columbia
- Producers: Iain Archer; Todd Clark

Singles from Exodus
- 1. "Hey Ma" Released: 23 May 2025; 2. "Talking with You" Released: 18 July 2025; 3. "Lose Lose" Released: 15 August 2025

Exodus is the debut extended play by Irish singer-songwriter Aaron Rowe. The EP was released on 12 September 2025 by Columbia Records. The EP was preceded by three singles—"Hey Ma", "Talking with You", and "Lose Lose".

== Promotion ==
=== Singles ===
Exodus was preceded by three singles: "Hey Ma", released on 23 May 2025, "Talking with You", released on 18 July 2025, and "Lose Lose", released on 15 August 2025.

== Critical reception ==
Professional ratings
Review scores
Source	Rating
Hive Magazine	4/5 stars

Melanie Falkensteiner of Hive Magazine gave Exodus 4 out of 5 stars, writing, "Although one shouldn't necessarily compare newcomers to other big voices in the music scene," when listening to the EP, "a certain resemblance to the likes of Sam Fender and Dermot Kennedy is undeniable." Falkensteiner also states that "Noah Kahan comes to mind as well" and concludes, "Exodus is a poignant debut. Aaron Rowe can only be congratulated on this brilliant body of work."

Thomas Bedward of Broken 8 Magazine felt that "Exodus [to be] more than just a collection of songs; it's a snapshot of Rowe's journey so far. Written during a pivotal period of leaving home and searching for a new sense of belonging, the EP is both deeply personal and universally resonant." Bedward continues, "With influences ranging from the soulful warmth of Motown to raw reflections on homesickness, Exodus offers a musical home for anyone navigating their own journey."

== Track listing ==
Exodus track listing
No.	Title	Writer(s)	Producer(s)	Length
1.	"Hey Ma"	Aaron Rowe; Iain Archer	Archer; Clark	4:00
2.	"Talking with You"	Rowe; Ian Fitchuk; Todd Clark	Clark	3:26
3.	"Lose Lose"	Rowe; Aiden Halliday; JC Stewart	Clark	3:37
4.	"Drawing the Line"	Rowe	Clark	3:09
5.	"The Lane"	Rowe	Clark	4:20
Total length:				18:32

== Personnel ==
Adapted from Tidal.

- Aaron Rowe – writing, vocals (all tracks)

=== Other musicians ===
- Iain Archer – writing, production (1)
- Todd Clark – writing (2), production (all tracks)
- Ian Fitchuk – writing (2)
- Aiden Halliday – writing (3)
- JC Stewart – writing (3)

== Charts ==
Chart performance for Exodus
Chart (2026)	Peak position
UK Album Downloads (Official Charts)	32
