= Slumville Sunrise =

Single by Jake Bugg

from the album Shangri La
- Released: 18 October 2013
- Recorded: 2013
- Studio: Shangri La, Malibu, California
- Length: 2:58
- Label: Mercury
- Songwriter(s): Jake Bugg, Iain Archer
- Producer(s): Rick Rubin

Jake Bugg singles chronology
"What Doesn't Kill You" (2013)	"Slumville Sunrise" (2013)	"A Song About Love" (2014)

"Slumville Sunrise" is a song by English singer-songwriter Jake Bugg. It was released as the second single from his second studio album Shangri La (2013). It was released as a digital download in the United Kingdom on 18 October 2013. The song was written by Bugg and Iain Archer and produced by Rick Rubin. It charted at number 81 on the UK Singles Chart.

== Track listings ==
Digital download
No.	Title	Length
1.	"Slumville Sunrise"	2:58

== Release history ==
Region	Date	Format	Label
United Kingdom	18 October 2013	Digital download	Mercury Records
