= Lightning Bolt (song) =

Single by Jake Bugg

from the album Jake Bugg
- Released: April 27, 2012
- Recorded: 2011
- Genre: Indie folk; skiffle
- Length: 2:23
- Label: Mercury Records
- Songwriters: Iain Archer, Jake Bugg
- Producer: Iain Archer

Jake Bugg singles chronology
"Country Song" (2012)	"Lightning Bolt" (2012)	"Taste It" (2012)

Music video
- "Jake Bugg - Lightning Bolt (Official Video)" on YouTube

"Lightning Bolt" is a song by English singer-songwriter Jake Bugg. It was released on 27 April 2012 in the United Kingdom via digital download, the third from his self-titled debut studio album Jake Bugg (2012).

Released as a single on 24 December 2012, it reached No. 26 in the UK Singles Chart in the week beginning 13 January 2013. It was Bugg's first UK Top 40 single and remains one of his biggest hits and more recognisable songs.

== Style and content ==
The "lightning bolt" of the title represents a sudden and unexpected situation in which the singer finds himself, a burst of fortunate events. The chorus describes the singer as someone who takes everything that has been put on his plate for him: "I just stand by and I wait my time". But he will take the chance when it comes his way: "when I see the signs I jump on that lightning bolt". He doesn't want to be one of those people who "walk with gritted teeth" and "toe the line", those who don't take chances and believe there aren't any answers.

The lightning bolt could also represent love at first sight:

"Met her as the angels parted for her
She only brought me torture
That's what happens
When it's you that's standing in the path of a lightning bolt."

So by "taking chances" the listener could assume "taking chances in love".

The song has been described as "reminiscent of early Beatles hits" and "was likened to Buddy Holly, Johnny Cash and early Dylan." Writing for the Sabotage Times in 2012, Joe Mardon said:

It chugs along with a quick acoustic beat matched by an instantly classic vocal delivery of fast paced lyrics, recalling "Subterranean Homesick Blues". You know straight away that Bugg's got something and repeat the song, twice last night, a further three times this morning. The smile returns every time.

Quick research reveals that Jake Bugg, bred on one of the UK's largest council estates in Nottingham, has only just turned eighteen. It's a fact that is, quite frankly, ridiculous.

He's a wordsmith in the Dylan sense of the word, painting pictures of the estate he grew up in, and the hope of getting out.

== Music video ==
An accompanying music video, lasting two minutes and thirty seconds, was first released on YouTube on 18 May 2012. By January 2025 it had received over 16 million views.

The video was shot in Amsterdam, Netherlands, with some scenes in Brussels, Belgium, and was directed by Michael Holyk, who also directed the video for Bugg's "Trouble Town".

== In popular culture ==
The song gained prominence in the UK after it was used as the backing-track to a recording of the 100m win by Usain Bolt at the 2012 London Olympics. Interviewed in October 2012 on BBC Radio Nottingham, Bugg confirmed that the song "had no relevance to the Olympics", but that he thought "it was great that they used it".

In April 2013 Bugg performed the song live at the offices of Billboard

In 2019 the song was featured in the show Lucifer, during the fourth episode of season four.

== Track listings ==
Digital download
No.	Title	Length
1.	"Lightning Bolt"	2:23

== Musicians ==
- Iain Archer: guitar, drums
- Jake Bugg: vocal, guitar

== Charts and certifications ==
=== Weekly charts ===
Chart (2012–13)	Peak position
Belgium (Ultratop 50 Flanders)	42
Czech Republic Airplay (ČNS IFPI)	53
Netherlands (Dutch Top 40)	33
Netherlands (Single Top 100)	35
Scottish Singles Sales (Official Charts)	21
UK Singles (Official Charts)	26
US Adult Alternative Airplay (Billboard)	15

=== Year-end charts ===
Chart (2013)	Position
UK Singles (Official Charts Company)	157
US Adult Alternative Songs (Billboard)	49

=== Certifications ===
Region	Certification	Certified units/sales
United Kingdom (BPI)	Platinum	600,000^{‡}
^{‡} Sales+streaming figures based on certification alone.

== Release history ==
Region	Date	Format	Label
United Kingdom	27 April 2012	Digital download	Mercury Records
United States	19 March 2013	Digital download	Mercury Records
