= Flood the Tanks =

Studio album by Iain Archer
- Released: 2004; 2005 (re-release)
- Recorded: 2004
- Genre: Rock, Indie
- Length: 46:07
- Label: Bright Star (original release); Pias (2005 re-release)
- Producer: The Amazing Pilots, Iain Archer

Iain Archer chronology
Crazy Bird (1996)	Flood the Tanks (2004)	Magnetic North (2006)

Alternative covers
- Flood the Tanks 2005 re-release cover

Professional ratings
Review scores
Source	Rating
BBC Music	
Music Emissions	4/5 stars
The Times	2/5 stars

Flood the Tanks is an album by the Northern Irish singer songwriter, Iain Archer. The album was originally released in 2004, but was later re-packaged and re-released on a different label in 2005. The songs "Running in Dreams " and "Boy Boy Boy" were released as singles.

== Track listing ==
No.	Title	Length
1.	"Pressure Drop"	3:26
2.	"Running In Dreams"	3:31
3.	"Boy Boy Boy"	3:58
4.	"Not Yourself"	4:38
5.	"Does This Have a Name"	2:40
6.	"Summer Jets"	4:08
7.	"I Wasn't Drinkin' But You Got Me Drunk"	3:30
8.	"A Few Conclusions"	3:26
9.	"The Shadow"	4:57
10.	"That One You Always Do" (contains hidden track "Mirrorball Moon")	12:17

2005 re-release
No.	Title	Length
1.	"Pressure Drop"	3:26
2.	"Boy Boy Boy"	3:58
3.	"Does This Have a Name"	2:40
4.	"Summer Jets"	4:08
5.	"A Few Conclusions"	3:26
6.	"Running In Dreams"	3:31
7.	"Not Yourself"	4:38
8.	"Mirrorball Moon"	4:59
9.	"The Shadow"	4:57
10.	"That One You Always Do" (contains hidden track "I Wasn't Drinkin' But You Got Me Drunk")	12:17

- In the 2005 version of the album, Mirrorball Moon is not hidden. Instead, I Wasn't Drinkin' But You Got Me Drunk is hidden.
