= Trouble Town =

Single by Jake Bugg

from the album Jake Bugg
- Released: 4 March 2012
- Recorded: 2011
- Length: 2:50
- Label: Mercury Records
- Songwriters: Iain Archer, Jake Bugg
- Producer: Iain Archer

Jake Bugg singles chronology
"Trouble Town" (2012)	"Country Song" (2012)

Official audio
- "Trouble Town" on YouTube

"Trouble Town" is a song by British singer songwriter Jake Bugg. It was released as the lead single from his eponymous debut album (2012). It was released as a digital download in the United Kingdom on 4 March 2012 and charted in Belgium.

"Trouble Town" is the opening theme for the BBC TV series Happy Valley broadcast between 2014 and 2023.

== Music video ==
A music video to accompany the release of "Trouble Town" was first released onto YouTube on 27 January 2012. By January 2022 it had received over 3.6 million hits

The video was shot in Bugg's hometown of Clifton, Nottingham, mixing HD footage with Super 8, and was directed by Michael Holyk, who also directed the video for "Lightning Bolt".

== Track listings ==
Digital download
No.	Title	Length
1.	"Trouble Town"	2:50

== Chart performance ==
=== Weekly charts ===
Chart (2012)	Peak position
Belgium (Ultratip Bubbling Under Flanders)	67

== Release history ==
Region	Date	Format	Label
United Kingdom	4 March 2012	Digital download	Mercury Records
