= Country Song (Jake Bugg song) =

Single by Jake Bugg

from the album Jake Bugg
- Released: 30 June 2012
- Recorded: 2011
- Genre: Country folk
- Length: 1:45
- Label: Mercury Records
- Songwriter(s): Jake Bugg
- Producer(s): Jason Hart

Jake Bugg singles chronology
"Trouble Town" (2012)	"Country Song" (2012)	"Lightning Bolt" (2012)

"Country Song" is a song by British singer songwriter Jake Bugg. It was released as the second single from his debut album studio album Jake Bugg (2012). It was released as a digital download in the United Kingdom on 30 June 2012.

== Music video ==
A music video to accompany the release of "Country Song" was first released onto YouTube on 13 April 2012 at a total length of two minutes and eight seconds. This was done to coincide with the track being used on the million pound advertising campaign from Greene King IPA which propelled Jake's career forwards

== Live performances ==
Bugg performed the song on the BBC Introducing Stage at Glastonbury 2011. On 25 May 2012, he performed the song on Later... with Jools Holland.

== Track listings ==
Digital download
No.	Title	Length
1.	"Country Song"	1:45

== Chart performance ==
Chart (2012)	Peak position
UK Singles (Official Charts Company)	100

== Release history ==
Region	Date	Format	Label
United Kingdom	30 March 2012	Digital download	Mercury Records
