= Aaron Rowe (singer) =

Irish singer-songwriter and musician (born 1996)

- Born: 1996 (age 29–30)
- Origin: Dublin, Ireland
- Genre: Folk
- Occupations: Singer-songwriter; musician
- Instruments: Vocals; guitar
- Works: Discography
- Years active: 2025–present
- Label: Columbia
- Website: www.aaron-rowe.com

Aaron Rowe (born 1996) is an Irish singer-songwriter and musician from Dublin. Rowe is best known for his debut single, "Hey Ma", released in May 2025, in addition to follow-up singles, "Talking with You" and "Lose Lose".

In 2026, he withdrew from being an opening act on Ed Sheeran's Loop Tour in protest of American rapper Macklemore being dropped for shouting "Free Palestine" on stage.

== Early life ==
Aaron Rowe was born in 1996, and was raised in Dublin.

== Career ==
Rowe released his debut single, "Hey Ma", on 23 May 2025. He followed this shortly thereafter to with "Talking with You" and "Lose Lose". His debut EP, Exodus, was released on 12 September 2025.

Throughout 2026, he released five songs: "Please Don't Hate Me", "John's Song", "Hollywood Sign", "Forever Now", and "Painter (Double-Edged Sword)".

On 15 September 2026, amidst the Macklemore–Ed Sheeran tour controversy, Rowe, alongside other musicians and bands, dropped out of being an opening act for Ed Sheeran's Loop Tour in protest of the decision to drop American rapper Macklemore for shouting "Free Palestine" on stage. Rowe stated that he could not "stand by and allow billionaires to use their position of power to silence the rightful voices of those who speak up against Israeli genocide and who highlight the savage murder of children. I would lose all respect for myself to carry on as normal."

== Discography ==
=== Extended plays ===
List of extended plays, with release date, label, and release formats shown
Title	EP details
Exodus	Released: 12 September 2025; Label: Columbia; Formats: LP, digital download, streaming

=== Singles ===
List of singles, with year released, selected chart positions, and album details shown
Title	Year	Peak chart positions	Album
Title	Year	IRE	Album
"Hey Ma"	2025	— (Note: "Hey Ma" did not reach the Irish Top 100 Singles Chart, but did peak at number 10 on the Irish Top 20 Homegrown Chart.)	Exodus
"Talking with You"	2025	— (Note: "Talking with You" did not reach the Irish Top 100 Singles Chart, but did peak at number 13 on the Irish Top 20 Homegrown Chart.)	Exodus
"Lose Lose"	2025	— (Note: "Lose Lose" did not reach the Irish Top 100 Singles Chart, but did peak at number 10 on the Irish Top 20 Homegrown Chart.)	Exodus
"Please Don't Hate Me"	2026	45	Non-album singles
"John's Song"	2026	— (Note: "John's Song" did not reach the Irish Top 100 Singles Chart, but did peak at number 7 on the Irish Top 20 Homegrown Chart.)	Non-album singles
"Hollywood Sign"	2026	80	Non-album singles
"Forever Now"	2026	68	Non-album singles
"Painter (Double-Edged Sword)"	2026	—	Non-album singles

=== Other charted songs ===
List of non-single chart appearances, with year released, selected chart positions, and album name shown
Title	Year	Peak chart positions	Album
Title	Year	IRE	Album
"Drawing the Line"	2025	— (Note: "Drawing the Line" did not reach the Irish Top 100 Singles Chart, but did peak at number 15 on the Irish Top 20 Homegrown Chart.)	Exodus
