= Talking with You =

Single by Aaron Rowe

from the EP Exodus
- Released: 18 July 2025
- Length: 3:26
- Label: Columbia
- Songwriters: Aaron Rowe; Ian Fitchuk; Todd Clark

Aaron Rowe singles chronology
"Hey Ma" (2025)	"Talking with You" (2025)	"Lose Lose" (2025)

"Talking with You" is a song by Irish singer-songwriter Aaron Rowe, released on 18 July 2025 via Columbia Records as the second single from his debut extended play, Exodus (2025).

== Background ==
"Talking with You" was written as a tribute to Rowe's uncle, Mick. In an interview with RTÉ, Rowe stated the song was about "[his] uncle back home in Ireland, who I'm very close with. I felt a bit guilty about moving away to London to chase my [dreams of] music because I knew that meant I wouldn't get to spend as much time with him - so this one's for Mick."

== Critical reception ==
Melanie Falkensteiner of Hive Magazine says "this track doesn't necessarily stand out as much but it's a beautiful addition, nevertheless. It's certainly a lot more open to interpretation as the lyrics could describe a failed relationship as well as the loss of a family member or a friend," as well as "the loneliness that comes with leaving home."

FrontView Magazine said "Aaron Rowe continues to prove himself [with "Talking with You"] as one of the most compelling new voices in music today –an artist whose songs resonate with honesty, warmth, and a sense of home."

== Credits and personnel ==
Adapted from Tidal.

- Aaron Rowe – writing, vocals
- Ian Fitchuk – writing
- Todd Clark – writing
