= Messed Up Kids =

EP by Jake Bugg
- Released: 12 May 2014
- Recorded: 2013 at Shangri-La, Malibu, California, U.S.
- Genres: Indie rock, indie folk
- Length: 12:55
- Label: Virgin EMI
- Producer: Rick Rubin

Jake Bugg chronology
Shangri La (2013)	Messed Up Kids (2014)	On My One (2016)

Messed Up Kids is a song featured on English indie rock artist Jake Bugg's second studio album Shangri La. The song is also the title track to an EP from that album, released on 12 May 2014, with three additional tracks recorded during the sessions for Shangri La. The song was also released as Digital Single and it has peaked at number 71 on the UK Singles Chart and number 67 in Belgium.

== Track listing ==
10" vinyl and download
No.	Title	Writer(s)	Length
1.	"Messed Up Kids"	Jake Bugg, Iain Archer, Brendan Benson	3:00
2.	"A Change in the Air"	Bugg, Archer	3:22
3.	"Strange Creatures"	Bugg, Archer	3:34
4.	"The Odds"	Bugg, Archer	3:01
Total length:			12:55
