= Lose Lose (song) =

Single by Aaron Rowe

from the EP Exodus
- Released: 15 August 2025
- Length: 3:37
- Label: Columbia
- Songwriters: Aaron Rowe; Aiden Halliday; JC Stewart

Aaron Rowe singles chronology
| "Talking with You" (2025) | "Lose Lose" (2025) | "Please Don't Hate Me" (2026) |

"Lose Lose" is a song by Irish singer-songwriter Aaron Rowe, released on 15 August 2025 through Columbia Records as the third single from his debut extended play, Exodus (2025).

== Critical reception ==
Melanie Falkensteiner of Hive Magazine said "Even though the song only just came out, it already has the air of a timeless classic to it. Proving that the combination of a piano and an acoustic guitar will always remain unmatched, the arrangement of "Lose Lose" is simply perfect."

Wonderland Magazine listed "Lose Lose" as a song on the magazine's "Wonderlist", saying Rowe is "Continuing to impress with his stunningly measured and expressive vocals" and that "'Lose Lose' is a subtle and sublime piece of pop balladry."

== Credits and personnel ==
Adapted from Tidal.

- Aaron Rowe – writing, vocals
- Aiden Halliday – writing
- JC Stewart – writing
