= Tired Pony =

Indie folk supergroup

- Origin: Northern Ireland; United States
- Genres: Indie folk
- Years active: 2009–2013
- Labels: Fiction Records, Mom + Pop Music
- Spinoff of: Belle & Sebastian, R.E.M., Snow Patrol
- Past members: Gary Lightbody; Richard Colburn; Iain Archer; Jacknife Lee; Peter Buck; Scott McCaughey; Troy Stewart

Tired Pony was an indie folk supergroup consisting of Gary Lightbody, Richard Colburn, Iain Archer, Jacknife Lee, Peter Buck, Scott McCaughey, Tom Smith and Troy Stewart. Lightbody formed the group out of his appreciation for country music, and has during the early planning phase described the group's music once as "country-tinged" but explained later that in the end the album's development turned out much more Americana than country during the whole creative process in the studio. The group visited Portland, Oregon in January 2010 to record this debut album, which was produced by member Lee; The Place We Ran From was released on 12 July 2010. Tired Pony began recording their second album The Ghost of the Mountain on 19 February 2013, which was released on 19 August 2013.

== History ==
Tired Pony was formed by Gary Lightbody (of Snow Patrol), who had a "long-term ambition" of making a country album. He revealed the project's existence in May 2009. In the interview, he expressed his love for country music, which he said he had loved for a long time: "I always thought I had a country album in me and it turns out I did." The rest of Snow Patrol expressed excitement for their band-mate, "delighted that [Lightbody was] getting to exercise all his crazy ideas." In October 2009, Lightbody in his blog on Snow Patrol's website revealed the members of the group to be Richard Colburn (of Belle & Sebastian), Iain Archer, singer Miriam Kaufmann (Archer's wife), and Jacknife Lee. He talked about two more members whom he was excited about, but didn't name them. He also stated that the album won't be country as was being reported, but would be "country-tinged". In January 2010, Hot Press reported Peter Buck (of R.E.M.) to be a member of the group. Lightbody described Buck as one of his "all-time heroes" and admired his talent for playing a variety of instruments. Lightbody looks at the project as something he has "wanted to get out of [his] system", and said that "[he doesn't] know whether people will dig it or not.". About the album he furthermore said he wanted to write a twisted love-letter to the States.

Tired Pony played their first ever live show at London's Forum venue in Kentish Town on July 14, 2010, and were joined on stage by 2009 Mercury Music Prize nominee Lisa Hannigan who stepped in for Zooey Deschanel on song "Get On The Road". Editors singer Tom Smith also joined the group on stage.

On September 30, 2010, Tired Pony appeared on the Late Show with David Letterman, performing "Dead American Writers" from their album, The Place We Ran From. "Get on the road" was also featured on Showtime drama "Shameless" at the end of "Just Like the Pilgrims Intended" episode. Also, the song played towards the end of the TV show "Pure Genius" episode 6 of season 1 titled "Bunker Hill, We have a Problem". Aired 12/1/2016.

=== 2010: The Place We Ran From ===
The Place We Ran From is the first album by Tired Pony. It was released on July 12, 2010, in the United Kingdom and on September 28, 2010, in the United States. Its first single was "Dead American Writers, released one week before the album on vinyl only." It was recorded in only one week in January 2010, in Portland, Oregon, United States. It includes contributions from actress and singer Zooey Deschanel, guitarist M. Ward, and Tom Smith of the indie rock group Editors. Apart from playing on the album, Jacknife Lee is handling album production. The video for "Dead American Writers" stars British actor Joseph Gilgun and was directed by Paul Fraser (a longtime collaborator of Shane Meadows).

On 13 October 2009, Lightbody debuted a Tired Pony song during Snow Patrol's tour stop in Portland, called "I Finally Love This Town". While playing an acoustic session for radio station KINK, he introduced the song, which he said he had written the previous night. He said that the song was "written in Portland, inspired by Portland."

== Discography ==
=== Studio albums ===
Year	Album details	Peak chart positions			
Year	Album details	UK	IRL	NL	BE
2010	The Place We Ran From: Released: 12 July 2010; Label: Fiction Records/Polydor Records; Formats: CD, LP, digital download	17	27	14	24
2013	The Ghost of the Mountain: Released: 19 August 2013; Label: Fiction Records/Polydor Records; Formats: CD, LP, digital download	14	34	31	109

=== Singles ===
Year	Title	Album
2010	"Dead American Writers"	The Place We Ran From
2010	"Get on the Road" (promo)	The Place We Ran From
2013	"All Things All at Once"	The Ghost of the Mountain
