= Jake Bugg (album) =

Studio album by Jake Bugg
- Released: 15 October 2012
- Genres: Indie folk; indie rock; folk rock
- Length: 39:19
- Labels: Mercury (UK), Island (US)
- Producers: Iain Archer, Mike Crossey, Matt Prime, Crispin Hunt, Jason Hart, Jake Bugg

Jake Bugg chronology
Jake Bugg (2012)	Shangri La (2013)

Singles from Jake Bugg
- 1. "Trouble Town" Released: 4 March 2012; 2. "Country Song" Released: 30 March 2012; 3. "Lightning Bolt" Released: 27 April 2012; 4. "Taste It" Released: 13 July 2012; 5. "Two Fingers" Released: 7 September 2012; 6. "Seen It All" Released: 25 February 2013; 7. "Broken" Released: 21 June 2013

Jake Bugg is the debut studio album by English singer-songwriter Jake Bugg. It was released on 15 October 2012 in the UK. It was released in the United States on 9 April 2013. The album has received generally favourable reviews from critics. It was nominated for the 2013 Mercury Prize.

== Singles ==
- "Trouble Town" was released as the lead single from the album on 4 March 2012.
- "Country Song" was released as the second single from the album on 30 March 2012. The song peaked at number 100 on the UK Singles Chart.
- "Lightning Bolt" was released as the third single from the album on 27 April 2012 in the UK and on 19 March 2013 in the US. The song peaked to number 26 on the UK Singles Chart, the song has also charted at number 45 on the Dutch Singles Chart.
- "Taste It" was released as the fourth single from the album on 13 July 2012 in the UK. The song peaked at number 90 on the UK Singles Chart.
- "Two Fingers" was released as the fifth single from the album on 7 September 2012 in the UK. The song peaked at number 28 on the UK Singles Chart.
- "Seen It All" was released as the sixth single from the album on 25 February 2013 in the UK. The song peaked at number 61 on the UK Singles Chart.
- "Broken" was released as the seventh single from the album on 21 June 2013 in the UK. It features string and choir arrangements by David Campbell, and the song peaked at number 44 on the UK Singles Chart.

== Commercial performance ==
On 21 October 2012, the album debuted at number one on the UK Albums Chart. On 18 October, it entered the Irish Albums Chart at number ten, before climbing to number eight in its second week and eventually reaching No. 3 in July 2013.

The album has also charted in Belgium, the Netherlands and Switzerland. It has sold over 604,100 copies in the UK and has been certified Platinum by the BPI.The album has sold 604,100 copies in the United Kingdom and is the 57th best selling album of the 2010 decade. The album debuted at number 75 on the US Billboard 200 with 6,000 copies sold.It has since gone two times platinum in the UK

== Critical reception ==
Professional ratings
Aggregate scores
Source	Rating
Metacritic	80/100
Review scores
Source	Rating
AllMusic	3.5/5 stars
BBC	(favourable)
The Guardian	3/5 stars
Impact	4/5 stars
NME	(9/10)
Rolling Stone	4/5 stars

Upon release, the album was well received by critics. At Metacritic, which assigns a normalised rating out of 100 to reviews from mainstream critics, the album received an average score of 80, based on 19 reviews, which indicates "generally favourable reviews".

Barry Nicolson of NME magazine gave the album a positive review and 9/10, praising Bugg's "authenticity", style of music and wit. Nicolson said: "On 'Two Fingers', Bugg talks wistfully of scheming on the streets of Clifton, where he and his mates would "skin up a fat one, hide from the feds", as though life held no nobler pursuit. You can tell that, up until now, his world has been small, and he might well have spiraled down the sinkhole that swallows so many marginalised estate kids. Eventually, however, Bugg comes to the same conclusion that we do: "Something is changing, changing, changing". If this debut album - rife with uncommon wit, insight and melody - is testament to anything, it's that his small, unremarkable world is about to get a whole lot bigger."

Chris Roberts, of BBC gave the album a positive review stating, "Things feel less derivative when he softens and just lets his voice and acoustic guitar nakedly affect. On the likes of Country Song and Someone Told Me, scepticism is tamed by the purity of the attempt. Fire is unabashedly romantic. That voice, with its hint of Gene Pitney, is a piercing, precise tool which lifts him above the laddish milieu. Ubiquity may beckon".

Will Hermes, of Rolling Stone, also gave a positive review, stating "Jake Bugg shows an artist who is crazy fully formed, stepping into a journey that should be worth following."

Rolling Stone went on to rank Jake Bugg as the 12th best album of 2013, calling him the "acoustic revivalist with the guts to shake up the traditions he loves."

== Track listing ==
No.	Title	Lyrics	Producer	Length
1.	"Lightning Bolt"	Jake Bugg, Iain Archer	Archer	2:24
2.	"Two Fingers"	Bugg, Archer	Mike Crossey	3:15
3.	"Taste It"	Bugg, Archer	Archer	2:24
4.	"Seen It All"	Bugg, Archer	Crossey	2:51
5.	"Simple as This"	Bugg, Matt Prime	Prime	3:19
6.	"Country Song"	Bugg	Jason Hart	1:49
7.	"Broken"	Bugg, Crispin Hunt	Hunt	4:07
8.	"Trouble Town"	Bugg, Archer	Archer	2:50
9.	"Ballad of Mr Jones"	Bugg, Archer	Crossey	2:39
10.	"Slide"	Bugg, Archer	Crossey	3:08
11.	"Someone Told Me"	Bugg	Hart	2:36
12.	"Note to Self"	Bugg, Archer	Archer	2:40
13.	"Someplace"	Bugg	Crossey	3:32
14.	"Fire"	Bugg	Jake Bugg	1:45
Total length:				39:19

Japanese edition bonus tracks
No.	Title	Length
15.	"Kentucky"	2:13
16.	"Love Me the Way You Do"	2:25
17.	"Green Man"	2:30

== Charts and certifications ==
=== Weekly charts ===
Chart (2012/13)	Peak position
Australian Albums (ARIA)	19
Austrian Albums (Ö3 Austria)	8
Belgian Albums (Ultratop Flanders)	11
Belgian Albums (Ultratop Wallonia)	56
Danish Albums (Hitlisten)	12
Dutch Albums (Album Top 100)	21
French Albums (SNEP)	21
German Albums (Offizielle Top 100)	10
Irish Albums (IRMA)	3
Japanese Albums (Oricon)	43
New Zealand Albums (RMNZ)	7
Norwegian Albums (VG-lista)	34
Scottish Albums (Official Charts)	1
Swiss Albums (Schweizer Hitparade)	39
UK Albums (Official Charts)	1
US Billboard 200	75
US Top Rock Albums (Billboard)	24

=== Year-end charts ===
Chart (2012)	Position
UK Albums (OCC)	53

Chart (2013)	Position
Belgian Albums (Ultratop Flanders)	46
Belgian Albums (Ultratop Wallonia)	196
French Albums (SNEP)	175
UK Albums (OCC)	14

Chart (2014)	Position
UK Albums (OCC)	73

=== Decade-end charts ===
Chart (2010–2019)	Position
UK Albums (OCC)	77

=== Certifications ===
Region	Certification	Certified units/sales
United Kingdom (BPI)	3× Platinum	900,000^{‡}
^{‡} Sales+streaming figures based on certification alone.

== Release history ==
Region	Release date	Format	Label
United Kingdom	15 October 2012	LP, CD, digital download	Mercury Records
United States	9 April 2013	LP, CD, digital download	Mercury Records
