= Texxas Jam =

Annual summer rock concert

Texxas Jam (Texxas World Music Festival)
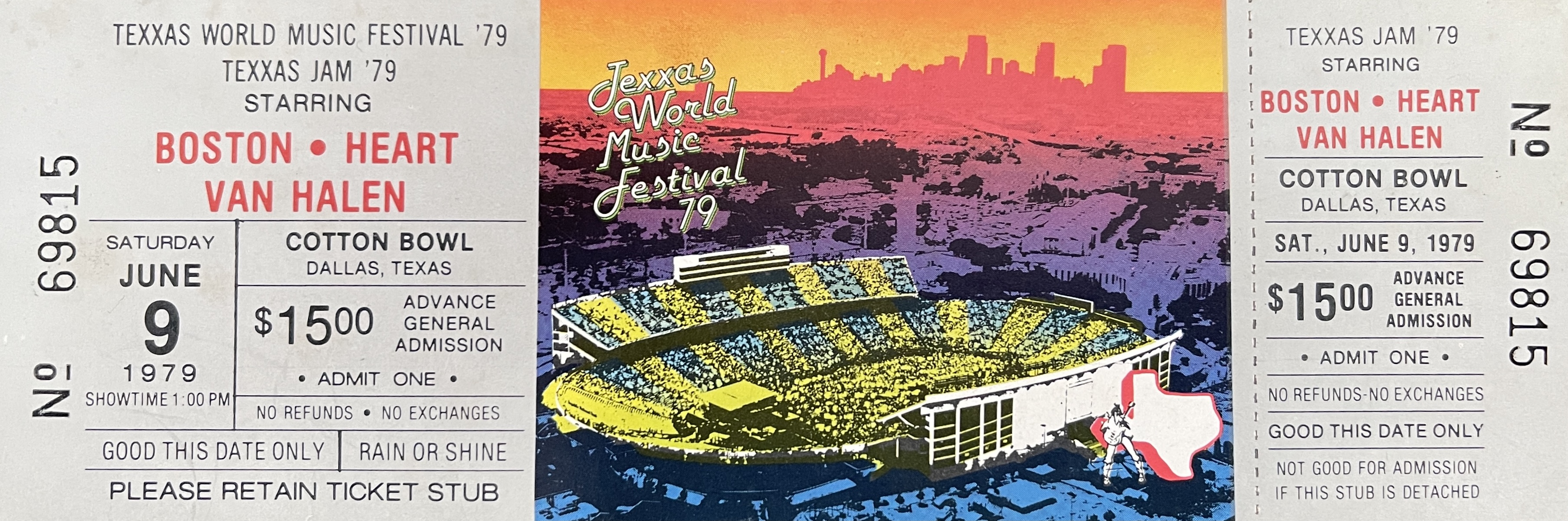
- Genre: Rock music, country, heavy metal, jam band music
- Dates: Fourth of July weekend
- Locations: Dallas; Houston
- Years active: 1978-1988
- Founders: Louis Messina, David Krebs
- Attendance: 100,000+
- Website: Blackstone Archives Site

Texxas Jam was the informal nickname of an annual summer rock concert called the Texxas World Music Festival (1978–1988). It was held in Dallas at the Cotton Bowl, and in Houston, at either the Astrodome or the Rice Stadium on the campus of Rice University.

The original Texxas Jam was a three-day festival held over the Fourth of July weekend in 1978 and encompassed rock and country. Texxas Jam was created by Louis Messina, promoter of Pace Concerts in Houston, and David Krebs, manager of the rock acts Ted Nugent and Aerosmith. Krebs wanted to duplicate the music festival California Jam II (held March 18, 1978 in Ontario, California) in Texas. Krebs was unfamiliar with the territory, so he contacted Messina in Houston.

A book, Texxas Jam: 1978–1988, was published in March 2011 covering all 11 Texxas Jams.

== Artists who performed at the Texxas Jam ==
(Headliners marked in bold.)

1978 (July 1) – Texxas Music Festival, Cotton Bowl, Dallas, Texas (General Admission – $12.50)

- Blackstone (Winner of the State-Wide "Battle of the Bands" for opening slot on the 1978 Texxas Jam)
- Walter Egan
- Van Halen (second appearance in Texas)
- Eddie Money
- Atlanta Rhythm Section
- Head East
- Journey
- Heart
- **Ted Nugent**
- **Aerosmith**
- Frank Marino and Mahogany Rush
- Cheech & Chong

Notes: Ted Nugent joined Aerosmith on stage for a rousing rendition of "Milk Cow Blues". For comic relief, Cheech & Chong entertained the crowd between a couple of acts. The temperature reached 104 degrees that day (over 120 degrees on the field). To protect the Cotton Bowl, they covered the surface with black tarps. Over 100,000 people were in attendance on the hottest day of the decade. The concert had hose sprinklers around the field edge to cool people off, and they hosed the crowd down with firehoses from the stage. First aid stations were busy.

This was the first southern stadium rock show since ZZ Top played to 80,000 people at UT Austin on September 1, 1974 and tore up the field. In the aftermath of the ZZ Top UT show there was never supposed to be another stadium rock show in Texas again, an informal prohibition that lasted all of four years.

1978 (July 23) – Cotton Bowl Jam 2, Cotton Bowl, Dallas, Texas

- Bob Welch
- Little River Band
- Steve Miller
- **Fleetwood Mac**

1979 (June 9) – Texxas Music Festival, Cotton Bowl, Dallas, Texas (General Admission – $15.00)

- TKO
- Sammy Hagar
- Nazareth
- Van Halen
- **Heart**
- **Boston**
- Blue Öyster Cult

Notes: TKO was managed by the same management as Heart at the time, which is the reason for their appearance on the bill. KTXQ-FM Q-102 simulcast much of this concert throughout the day, with TKO, Hagar, Nazareth, and portions of Heart's show aired live. Van Halen's set was not broadcast. KTXQ had to unplug their connection to the mixing board prior to Boston's set, which they did before Heart performed.. As a result, only a portion of Heart's set was aired, the sound being broadcast from microphones placed around the Cotton Bowl.

1979 (Sunday, August 26) – Cotton Bowl in Dallas (General Admission – $15.00) "A Farewell To A Texas Summer"

Officially called "The Last Concert of the Last Weekend of the Last Summer of the Seventies".

- **Rush** (Permanent Waves "warmup" tour)
- **Foghat**
- Pat Travers
- Joan Jett & The Blackhearts
- Billy Thorpe
- Little River Band
- Point Blank

Note: Rush performed pre-studio versions of "The Spirit of Radio" and "Freewill".

1980 (June 21) – Cotton Bowl in Dallas (General Admission – $16.50)

- **Eagles**
- Cheap Trick
- **Foreigner**
- April Wine
- Sammy Hagar
- Christopher Cross

Notes: Savvy was bumped at the last minute by The Eagles' management. (Show lineup confirmed by Steve Jones of Savvy.) Christopher Cross, who already didn't fit on the hard-rocking Texxas Jam stage, was resoundingly booed at the outset of "Sailing", then later cut his set short after throwing up on stage due to heat exhaustion. The Eagles refused to play at first and were an hour late going on due to issues with the 'Hard Rock' line up.

1981 (July 18) – Astrodome in Houston (General Admission – $17.00)

- REO Speedwagon
- Heart
- **Blue Öyster Cult**
- Foghat
- The Rockets

Notes: Savvy was originally scheduled to open, but was bumped by REO Speedwagon's management (same management as The Eagles in 1980). (Show lineup confirmed by Steve Jones of Savvy.)

Notes: The '81 Jam was held in Houston that year because of the intense summer heat in Texas. The promoters decided to move it indoors to the Astrodome in Houston, marking the Jam's first Houston date. The festival would be split between Dallas and Houston through 1984.

1982 (Dallas-June 12, Houston-June 13)

- Journey
- **Santana**
- Sammy Hagar
- Joan Jett
- Point Blank

Notes: It was a hot day that day. Sammy Hagar had a guitar stolen backstage at the Cotton Bowl show; it was returned later that day. However, Hagar vowed to never play it again after it had been handled by someone else, and lit it on fire on stage. Sammy also announced that he was "the greatest guitar player in the world" Right before Santana's set, the house music mix played their hit "Winning", the lead singer and other band members came onstage and motioned to the sound mixers to try to get the song cut off; afterwards the band did not play "Winning" during their set.

Correction: Sammy's guitar was stolen from a previous Dallas show. Was recovered and Sammy held it until the Texxas Jam. Where he explained the incident and destroyed the guitar. The guitar was never set on fire. Sammy smashed the guitar onstage and threw it into the crowd.

1982 (August) (Cotton Bowl Dallas, TX) This show was referred to as "The Super Bowl of Rock N Roll". This show was late summer & was not truly considered a Texxas Jam.

- Le Roux was the warm up (beginning) act.
- Ozzy Osbourne
- Loverboy
- Foreigner

Notes: Ozzy had a shaved head and black makeup around his eyes – from a distance, it looked like a skull.

1983 (Dallas – June 18, Houston – June 19)

- Styx (Kilroy Was Here tour)
- Sammy Hagar
- Triumph
- Ted Nugent
- Uriah Heep

Notes: Hagar came on just before Styx at the end. Ted Nugent and Rik Emmett joined Sammy Hagar on stage in Dallas for their version of Led Zeppelin's "Rock 'n Roll." Tommy Shaw recalls these shows - particularly Dallas - as being some of the worst of his career. He claims to have feared for his life as his band was performing nothing but the rock opera "Kilroy Was Here" after some of the best hard rock bands of the day had performed, combined with other factors including triple-degree temperatures and rowdy concertgoers. (This was the tour that essentially ended Styx.)

1984 (June 8) Houston Astrodome / (June 10) Cotton Bowl in Dallas

- **Rush** (Grace Under Pressure tour)
- .38 Special (Tour de Force tour)
- Ozzy Osbourne (Bark at the Moon tour)
- Bryan Adams (Reckless Tour)
- Gary Moore (Victims of the Future tour)

Notes: Bryan Adams' drummer for this show was Matt Frenette of Loverboy.

1985 (August 24) – Cotton Bowl in Dallas

- **Deep Purple** (Perfect Strangers tour)
- **Scorpions**
- Night Ranger
- Ted Nugent
- Bon Jovi
- Grim Reaper
- Victory

1986 (July 19)

- **Van Halen**
- Dio
- Loverboy
- **Krokus**
- Keel
- Bachman–Turner Overdrive

Notes: Leslie West joined BTO on stage to perform Mountain's "Mississippi Queen."

1987 (June 20) – Cotton Bowl in Dallas (General Admission – $20.25)

- **Boston**
- **Aerosmith**
- **Whitesnake**
- Poison
- Tesla
- Farrenheit

Notes: The live concert footage for Poison's video "I Won't Forget You" was filmed at this performance. The crowd seemed wild about Poison while in actuality a drunk concertgoer was on top of a lighting tower (about 30' up) trampolining on the tarp roof in nothing but a pair of blue jeans. The crowd really enjoyed him and the Dallas PD's attempt to get him safely to the ground. Also, Poison was joined onstage by Paul Stanley for their performance of KISS' "Strutter". The temperature in Dallas that day reached 104 degrees Fahrenheit, prompting many in the very crowded ground area to pass out and be lifted overhead to the indoor areas of the stadium where there were water fountains. Water from hoses was also sprayed on the concertgoers in the field.

1988 (a.k.a. "The Monsters of Rock", July 3) – Cotton Bowl in Dallas (General Admission – $25)

- **Van Halen** (OU812 Tour)
- Scorpions (Savage Amusement tour)
- Dokken
- **Metallica** (Between Master of Puppets Tour and ...And Justice for All Tour).
- Kingdom Come

Notes: Van Halen's Sammy Hagar lost his voice after only a couple of songs. He then promised to play a free show in Dallas. A few years later, Van Halen followed through on that promise. And some guy shot an aerial flare into the sky during Van Halen’s set.

== See also ==
- List of historic rock festivals
- List of heavy metal festivals
- List of music festivals in the United States
