= What Doesn't Kill You (Jake Bugg song) =

Single by Jake Bugg

from the album Shangri La
- Released: 24 September 2013
- Recorded: 2013 (Shangri La, Malibu, California)
- Genre: Punk rock; garage rock; garage punk
- Length: 2:04
- Label: Mercury Records
- Songwriter(s): Jake Bugg, Iain Archer
- Producer(s): Rick Rubin

Jake Bugg singles chronology
"Broken" (2013)	"What Doesn't Kill You" (2013)	"Slumville Sunrise" (2013)

"What Doesn't Kill You" is a song by English singer-songwriter Jake Bugg. It was released as the lead single from his second studio album Shangri La (2013). It was released as a digital download in the United Kingdom on 24 September 2013. The song was written by Bugg and Iain Archer and produced by Rick Rubin. The song has peaked at number 44 on the UK Singles Chart and number 32 in Scotland. The title alludes to the Nietzsche quote.

== Music video ==
A music video to accompany the release of "What Doesn't Kill You" was first released onto YouTube on 23 September 2013 at a total length of three minutes.

== Personnel ==
- Lead vocals – Jake Bugg
- Lyrics – Jake Bugg, Iain Archer
- Producer – Rick Rubin

== Track listings ==
Digital download
No.	Title	Length
1.	"What Doesn't Kill You"	2:04

== Charts ==
Chart (2013)	Peak position
Scotland (OCC)	32
UK Singles (OCC)	44
US Alternative Airplay (Billboard)	36

== Release history ==
Region	Date	Format	Label
United Kingdom	24 September 2013	Digital download	Mercury Records
