= Ellie Banke =

Singer-songwriter born in 2000

Ellie Banke (born December 7, 2000) is a singer-songwriter from Downers Grove, Illinois. After a viral collaboration with singer Ed Sheeran, Banke was an opener for his Loop Tour in 2026.

== Education ==
Banke attended Downers Grove North High School, where she sang a cover of "Photograph" at a pep assembly as a freshman. She is a student of Cheryl Porter, an internet-famous vocal coach and Broadway actress.

== Music career ==
Banke released her first song when she was sixteen years old. Her discography includes “I Got U, U Got Me,” “928 Miles,” and “Ireland,” each of which has more than a million streams on Spotify.

After going viral for a cover of Ed Sheeran's song "Dive", Sheeran flew Banke to London for a collaboration. Sheeran and Banke's duet of "Dive" also went viral with more than 20 million views. In September 2025, it was announced that Banke would open for the Chicago and Minneapolis stops of Sheeran's Loop Tour.

In June 2026, Banke opened for Ed Sheeran's Loop Tour at Soldier Field alongside Myles Smith.

Banke plans to release her debut album, Starlight, in August 2026. Songs on this album will include the titular song Starlight, Tenacity, and Her.

Banke's musical style has been described as a mix of pop, indie, and R&B.
