= Taste It (Jake Bugg song) =

Single by Jake Bugg

from the album Jake Bugg
- Released: 13 July 2012
- Recorded: 2011
- Genre: Folk rock; garage rock
- Length: 2:24
- Label: Mercury Records
- Songwriter(s): Iain Archer, Jake Bugg
- Producer(s): Iain Archer

Jake Bugg singles chronology
"Lightning Bolt" (2012)	"Taste It" (2012)	"Two Fingers" (2012)
- Used in a 2014 Nissan Ultima TV advert.

"Taste It" is a song by British singer songwriter Jake Bugg. It was released as the fourth single from his debut studio album Jake Bugg (2012). The song is also the title track of a four track EP. It was released as a digital download in the United Kingdom on 13 July 2012.

== Music video ==
A music video to accompany the release of "Taste It" was first released onto YouTube on 9 July 2012 at a total length of two minutes and twenty-seven seconds.

== Track listings ==
Digital download
No.	Title	Length
1.	"Taste It"	2:24
2.	"Kentucky"	2:13
3.	"Love Me the Way You Do"	2:25
4.	"Green Man"	2:30

== Chart performance ==
Chart (2012)	Peak position
Japan Hot Overseas (Billboard)	16
UK Singles (Official Charts Company)	90

== Release history ==
Region	Date	Format	Label
United Kingdom	13 July 2012	Digital download	Mercury Records
