= Two Fingers =

Single by Jake Bugg

from the album Jake Bugg
- Released: 7 September 2012
- Recorded: 2011
- Genre: Folk rock
- Length: 3:16
- Label: Mercury
- Songwriters: Iain Archer, Jake Bugg
- Producer: Mike Crossey

Jake Bugg singles chronology
"Taste It" (2012)	"Two Fingers" (2012)	"Seen It All" (2013)

"Two Fingers" is a song by British singer songwriter Jake Bugg. It was released as the fifth single from his self-titled debut album (2012). It was released as a digital download in the United Kingdom on 7 September 2012. The song peaked at number 28 on the UK Singles Chart. The song premiered on BBC Radio 1 as Zane Lowe's 'Hottest Record In The World' on 3 September 2012.

== Music video ==
A music video to accompany the release of "Two Fingers" was first released onto YouTube on 23 September 2012 at a total length of three minutes and forty-four seconds. The video was directed by Jamie Thraves.

== Track listings ==
Digital download
No.	Title	Length
1.	"Two Fingers"	3:16

== Charts and certifications ==
Chart (2012)	Peak position
Belgium (Ultratip Bubbling Under Flanders)	8
Belgium (Ultratip Bubbling Under Wallonia)	34
Japan (Japan Hot 100) (Billboard)	49
Scotland Singles (OCC)	23
UK Singles (OCC)	28

== Certifications ==
Region	Certification	Certified units/sales
Brazil (Pro-Música Brasil)	Gold	30,000^{‡}
United Kingdom (BPI)	Gold	400,000^{‡}
^{‡} Sales+streaming figures based on certification alone.

== Release history ==
Region	Date	Format	Label
United Kingdom	7 September 2012	Digital download	Mercury Records
United States	4 February 2013	Airplay	Mercury Records/Island Records
