= Please Don't Hate Me (Aaron Rowe song) =

Single by Aaron Rowe
- Released: 16 January 2026
- Genre: Folk
- Length: 3:21
- Label: Columbia
- Songwriters: Aaron Rowe; Bill Maybury; Will Bloomfield

Aaron Rowe singles chronology
"Lose Lose" (2025)	"Please Don't Hate Me" (2026)	"John's Song" (2026)

"Please Don't Hate Me" is a song by Irish singer-songwriter Aaron Rowe, released on 16 January 2026 by Columbia Records.

== Critical reception ==
Thomas Bedward of Broken 8 Magazine said "[the song] leans into a more intimate vulnerability. ["Please Don't Hate Me"] breathes with raw honesty, stripping back the layers to reveal the man behind the rising stardom."

Robin Murray of Clash said, "A lush, folk-informed slice of songwriting, "Please Don't Hate Me" allows the listener to find their own space in the music." Hot Press said "Like collapsing to your knees or seeing John Cusack with a boombox outside your window, "Please Don't Hate Me" is beautifully flawed and hopelessly apologetic."

== Credits and personnel ==
Adapted from Tidal.

- Aaron Rowe – writing, vocals
- Bill Maybury – writing
- Will Bloomfield – writing
