= Magnetic North (Iain Archer album) =

Studio album by Iain Archer
- Released: 18 September 2006
- Recorded: 2005–2006
- Genre: Rock, indie
- Length: 52:55
- Label: Pias
- Producer: David Kosten, Iain Archer

Iain Archer chronology
Flood the Tanks (2004)	Magnetic North (2006)	To the Pine Roots (2009)

Professional ratings
Review scores
Source	Rating
Rocklouder	3/5 stars

Magnetic North is an album by Iain Archer, the follow-up album to 2004's Flood The Tanks. Both "When It Kicks In" and "Soleil" were released as singles.

== Track listing ==
No.	Title	Length
1.	"Canal Song (End of Sentence)"	4:28
2.	"Minus Ten"	3:06
3.	"When It Kicks In"	3:42
4.	"Collect Yourself"	4:05
5.	"Soleil"	4:14
6.	"Everything I've Got"	6:14
7.	"Arriero"	5:11
8.	"Frozen Northern Shores"	3:56
9.	"Long Jump"	4:16
10.	"Luke's Point"	3:49
11.	"Lifeboat"	4:08

Hidden track
No.	Title	Length
12.	"You Make Me Forget Myself"	3:37
