= Shangri La (Jake Bugg album) =

Studio album by Jake Bugg
- Released: 18 November 2013
- Recorded: 2013
- Studios: Shangri-La, Malibu, California, U.S.
- Genres: Indie rock; folk rock; Americana
- Length: 39:57
- Labels: Mercury (UK), Island (U.S.)
- Producer: Rick Rubin

Jake Bugg chronology
Jake Bugg (2012)	Shangri La (2013)	Messed Up Kids (2014)

Singles from Shangri La
- 1. "What Doesn't Kill You" Released: 23 September 2013; 2. "Slumville Sunrise" Released: 21 October 2013; 3. "A Song About Love" Released: 10 January 2014; 4. "Me and You" Released: 10 March 2014; 5. "Messed Up Kids" Released: 12 May 2014; 6. "There's a Beast and We All Feed It" Released: 28 July 2014

Shangri La is the second studio album by English indie rock singer-songwriter Jake Bugg. The album was produced by Rick Rubin and named after his studio in Malibu, California, where recording took place in the summer of 2013. The album was released on 18 November 2013 and was met with mixed reactions from fans and critics.

== Release ==
The first single "What Doesn't Kill You" was announced and released from Shangri La on 23 September 2013. On 17 October 2013, "Slumville Sunrise" was revealed as the second single from the album, and a video promoting the song and album was released. Two more singles, "A Song About Love" and "Me and You" were released in early 2014. However these singles, and indeed all the singles from this album, failed commercially compared to the singles from his previous album, none reaching the UK Top 40. The album was originally scheduled for release in the United States on 14 January 2014, by Island Records, with a five-song EP released on 18 November 2013. However, following a "sold-out" tour in the United States, the release was rescheduled to 19 November 2013, a day after the UK release.

== Critical reception ==
Professional ratings
Aggregate scores
Source	Rating
Metacritic	66/100
Review scores
Source	Rating
AllMusic	2/5 stars
Clash	9/10 stars
Digital Spy	4/5 stars
Drowned in Sound	6/10 stars
The Guardian	2/5 stars
The Independent	4/5 stars
Metro	4/5 stars
Mojo	4/5 stars
NME	6/10 stars
Rolling Stone	3.5/5 stars
Time Out	3/5 stars

The album received mixed reviews from critics. Barry Nicolson from the NME gave the album a 6/10 review and said "By rush-releasing ‘Shangri La’, Bugg manages to circumvent some second album pratfalls, although he's succumbed to the most obvious one – it's not as good as his first." The Guardian also gave a negative review, giving the album 2 stars and remarking that "his new album is pretty run of the mill".

However at Metacritic, which assigns a normalised rating out of 100 to reviews from mainstream critics, the album received an average score of 66 (based on 15 reviews) indicating the reception of the album has been 'generally favourable'.

== Track listing ==
No.	Title	Lyrics	Length
1.	"There's a Beast and We All Feed It"	Jake Bugg, Iain Archer	1:43
2.	"Slumville Sunrise"	Bugg, Archer	2:59
3.	"What Doesn't Kill You"	Bugg, Archer	2:08
4.	"Me and You"	Bugg	2:57
5.	"Messed Up Kids"	Bugg, Archer, Brendan Benson	2:59
6.	"A Song About Love"	Bugg, Archer	3:58
7.	"All Your Reasons"	Bugg	5:08
8.	"Kingpin"	Bugg, Archer, Benson	2:30
9.	"Kitchen Table"	Bugg	4:55
10.	"Pine Trees"	Bugg, Archer	2:45
11.	"Simple Pleasures"	Bugg, Matt Sweeney	5:01
12.	"Storm Passes Away"	Bugg, Archer, Benson	2:55

Bonus tracks

- "Strange Creatures" (Free download from Amazon.de)
- "A Change in the Air" (Extra track from Japanese release of the album)

== Personnel ==
- Jake Bugg – lead vocals, lead guitar, acoustic guitar, slide guitar, piano
- Jason Lader – bass guitar
- Matt Sweeney – rhythm guitar
- Pete Thomas - drums
- Chad Smith - drums

== Charts and certifications ==
=== Weekly charts ===
Chart (2013)	Peak position
Australian Albums (ARIA)	38
Austrian Albums (Ö3 Austria)	22
Belgian Albums (Ultratop Flanders)	14
Belgian Albums (Ultratop Wallonia)	42
Danish Albums (Hitlisten)	30
Dutch Albums (Album Top 100)	32
French Albums (SNEP)	61
German Albums (Offizielle Top 100)	21
Irish Albums (IRMA)	9
Italian Albums (FIMI)	96
New Zealand Albums (RMNZ)	19
Norwegian Albums (VG-lista)	28
Scottish Albums (Official Charts)	2
Swiss Albums (Schweizer Hitparade)	19
UK Albums (Official Charts)	3
UK Album Downloads (Official Charts)	3
US Billboard 200	46
US Top Alternative Albums (Billboard)	8
US Americana/Folk Albums (Billboard)	1
US Top Rock Albums (Billboard)	14

=== Year-end charts ===
Chart (2013)	Position
Belgian Albums (Ultratop Flanders)	198
UK Albums (OCC)	68
Chart (2014)	Position
Belgium Albums (Ultratop Flanders)	150
UK Albums (OCC)	61

=== Certifications ===
Region	Certification	Certified units/sales
United Kingdom (BPI)	Gold	258,061
