= Louis Messina =

American concert promoter

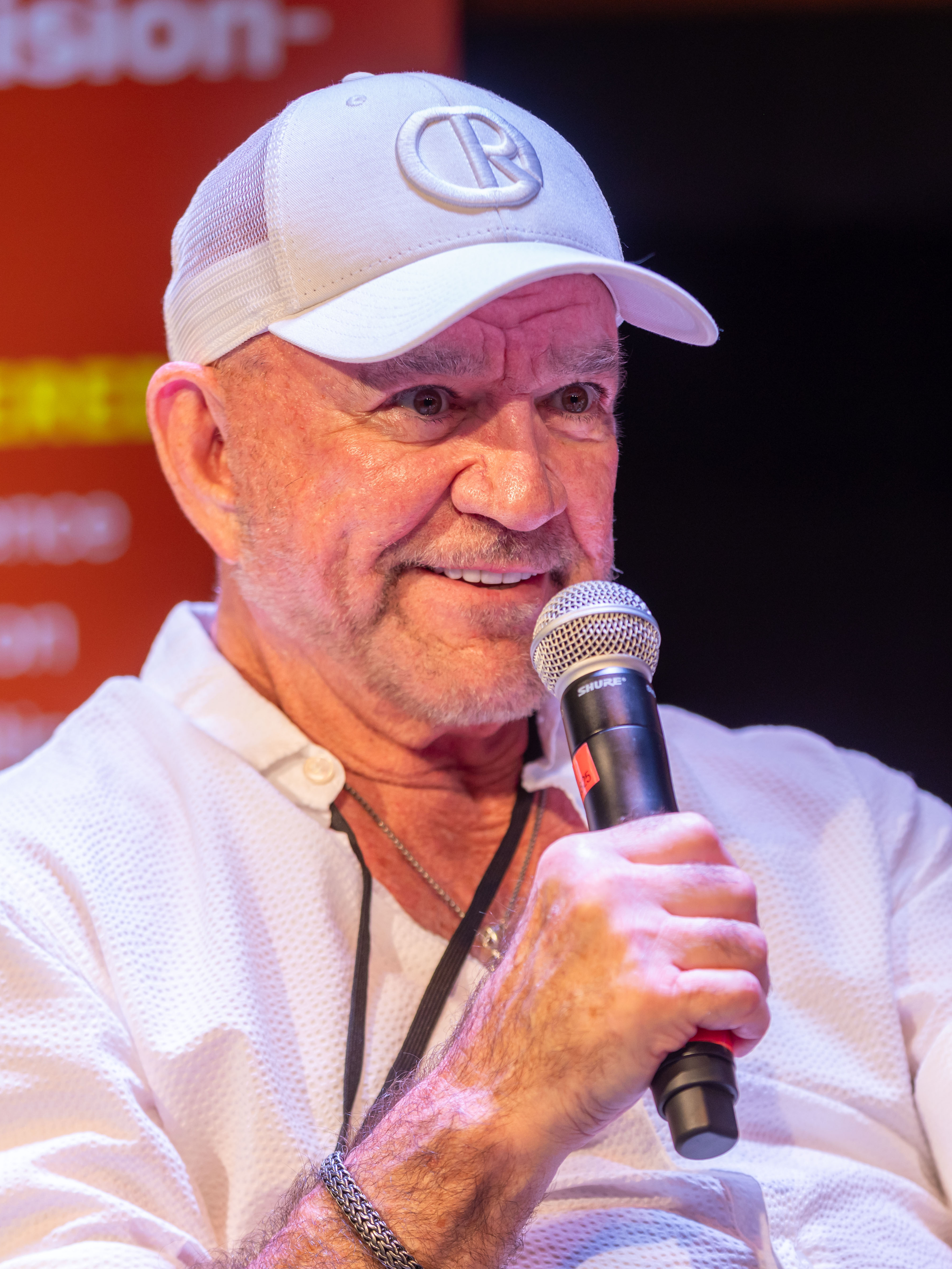
- Messina in 2024
- Occupation: Promoter
- Organization: Messina Group
- Known for: Promotion of Taylor Swift; George Strait

Louis Messina is an American concert promoter who is best known for promoting Taylor Swift and George Strait.

== Early life ==
Louis Messina's father was “Leapin’ Lou” Messina, a New Orleans Boxing promoter. Living across the street from New Orleans’ Municipal Auditorium, his father took him to an Elvis Presley concert when he was 7 years old leading to his interest in music.

== Music career ==
In 1975 Messina co-founded PACE Concerts. Messina founded the annual summer rock concert series Texxas World Music Festival (1978–1988), also known as Texxas Jam. In Dallas, it was held at the Cotton Bowl, and in Houston, at either the Astrodome or Rice Stadium on the campus of Rice University. He also conceived of OzzFest with Sharon Osborne. Messina also promoted concerts in outdoor amphitheaters which indirectly reshaped the concert business. In 1997, Pace Concerts was bought by SFX. After SFX was sold to Clear Channel in 2000, Messina went out on his own to promote George Strait. His promotion of George Strait led him to work with other artists, including Taylor Swift, Ed Sheeran, Phoebe Bridgers, and Zac Brown Band. Through 2022, Messina had promoted shows grossing over $4.5 billion. Messina received the Tony Martell Lifetime Entertainment Achievement Award. Messina also received the CMA Touring Lifetime Achievement Award. On June 15, 2024 George Strait's concert in Texas with 110,905 fans in attendance is believed to be the largest single ticketed concert in U.S. History. In 2025, Messina was inducted into the Pollstar Live Hall of Fame.

In September 2026, Ed Sheeran said that Messina Touring Group, the promoter of his Loop tour, decided to remove Macklemore from the tour amid pressure from pro-Israel interest groups as well as Robert Kraft and other venue owners after Macklemore made onstage "free Palestine" statements and spoke out against the Gaza genocide during his act.
