= The Ghost of the Mountain =

Studio album by Tired Pony
- Released: 19 August 2013
- Recorded: February–March 2013
- Genre: Rock
- Label: Polydor

Singles from The Ghost of the Mountain
- 1. "All Things All at Once" Released: 9 July 2013

The Ghost of the Mountain is the second album by Tired Pony, released on 19 August 2013 in the United Kingdom and on 1 October 2013 in the United States. The album was recorded between February and March, 2013, at Jacknife Lee's studio in Topanga Canyon.

== Recording ==
"It feels like a fully formed band in full flight", says Lightbody about the album. This album features harmony vocals from Minnie Driver, Bronagh Gallagher and Kim Topper.

== Promotion ==
"All Things All at Once" is the first single to be heard from the album. The band will do exclusive performances for Absolute Radio and XFM between 12–14 August.

On Thursday 15 August Gary Lightbody, Iain Archer and Peter Buck were interviewed and performed "All Things All at Once" and "The Creak in the Floorboards" in session for Jo Whiley's BBC Radio 2 show. This was broadcast on Friday 16 August shortly after 8pm.

On Monday 23 September 2013, Tired Pony performed "All Things All at Once" on The Late Show with David Letterman, on the same episode where former president Bill Clinton was the main guest.

== Reception ==
Professional ratings
Aggregate scores
Source	Rating
Metacritic	67/100
Review scores
Source	Rating
Metro UK	3/5 stars
The Guardian	3/5 stars
The Music Service	6/10

MetroUK rated the album three stars out of five.

The Guardian's Dave Simpson rated the album as three stars out of five.

== Track listing ==
1. "I Don't Want You as a Ghost"
2. "I'm Begging You Not to Go"
3. "Blood"
4. "The Creak in the Floorboards"
5. "All Things All at Once"
6. "Wreckage and Bone"
7. "The Beginning of the End"
8. "Carve Our Names"
9. "Ravens and Wolves"
10. "Punishment"
11. "The Ghost of the Mountain"
12. "Your Way Is the Way Home"

== Release history ==
Region	Date
Ireland	16 August 2013
United Kingdom	19 August 2013
United States	1 October 2013
