= BIIRD =

Irish folk music band

- Origin: Ireland
- Genres: Irish traditional, folk
- Years active: 2024–present
- Members: Lisa Canny; Laura Doherty; Zoran Donohoe; Sal Heneghan; Miadhachlughain O'Donnell; Nicole Lonergan; Niamh Hinchy; Aoife Kelly; Ciara Ní Mhurchú; Hannah Hiemstra; Claire Loughran; Aisling Sage
- Website: biirdshop.com

BIIRD is an all-female Irish folk music band formed in 2024 by Lisa Canny, a seven-time All-Ireland champion on harp and banjo. The group describes itself as "an Irish traditional music collective collaborating with Ireland's leading designers and stylists to change the perception of trad worldwide."

On St Patrick’s Day in 2024, the 11-piece group performed their first gig to a crowd of 10,000 at Trafalgar Square in London. They have since performed at the Belfast TradFest, Galway International Arts Festival and the All Together Now festival, and have appeared on Irish talk show, The Late Late Show.

In 2025, following a meeting with Ed Sheeran at a pub session at Fleadh Cheoil na hÉireann in Wexford, they were invited to join his Loop Tour in New Zealand, Australia and North America as a support act along with fellow Irish acts Amble and Aaron Rowe. The band spoke out in support of Macklemore, who was kicked off the line-up for sharing his support for Palestine.

In May 2026, it was announced that the band would be one of the support acts for Westlife's 25th Anniversary World Tour. In the same month, it was reported that the band were working on their debut album at Decoy Studios in Suffolk. The album is part funded by Ed Sheeran.

== Members ==
- Lisa Canny - Vocals, Harp, Banjo
- Laura Doherty - Fiddle, Guitar
- Zoran Donohoe - Concertina
- Sal Heneghan - Fiddle, Harp
- Miadhachlughain O'Donnell - Vocals, Irish Flute, Shruti Box
- Nicole Lonergan - Fiddle, Step Dancing
- Niamh Hinchy - Vocals, Synthesisers, Whistle
- Aoife Kelly - Cello
- Ciara Ní Mhurchú - Fiddle, Step Dancing
- Hannah Hiemstra - Drums
- Claire Loughran - Harp, Fiddle
- Aisling Sage - Fiddle
