= Iain Archer =

Irish singer-songwriter

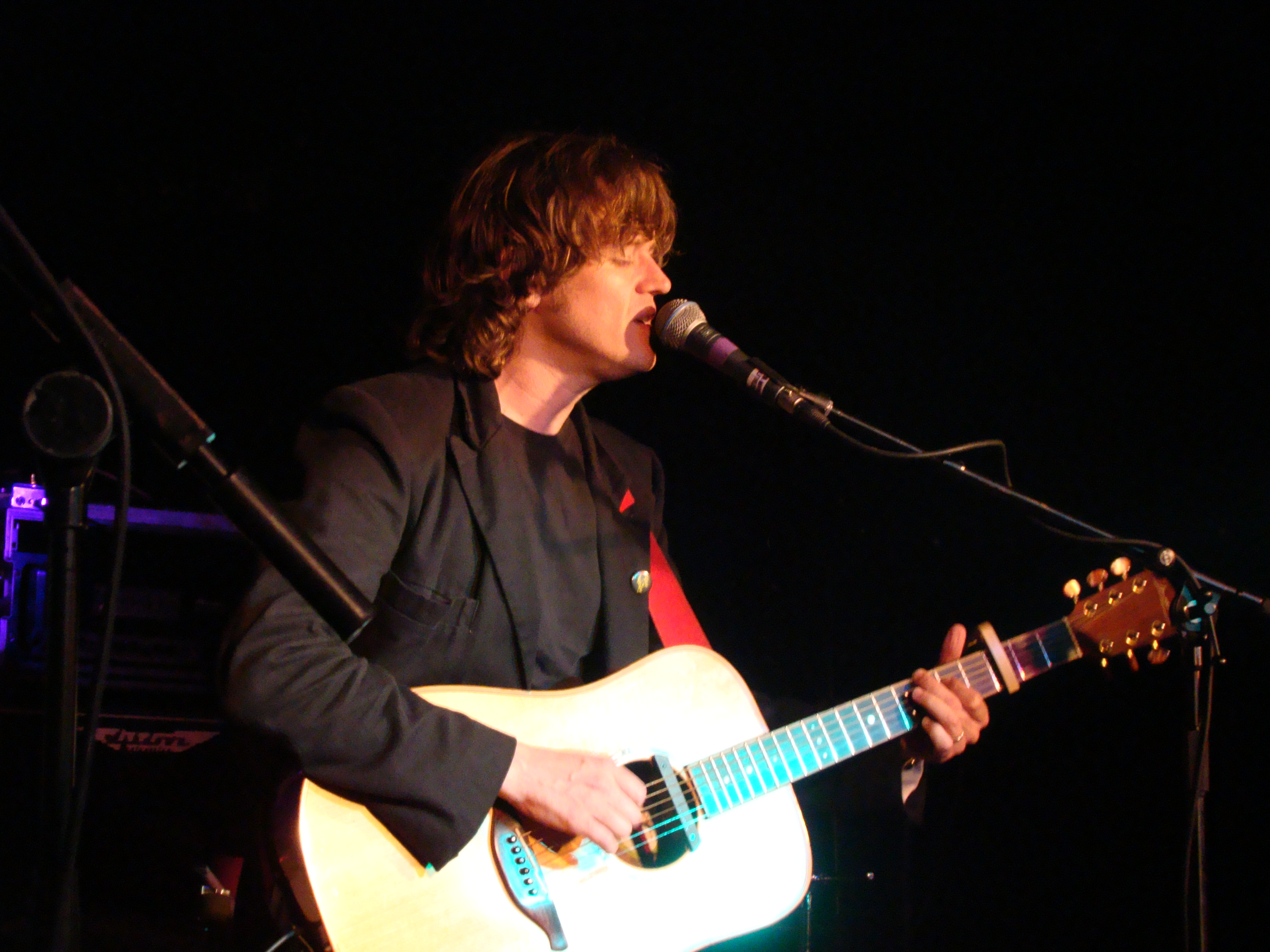
- Archer in 2009

Background information
- Born: Iain Denis Archer; Bangor, Northern Ireland
- Genres: Rock, folk, indie
- Occupations: Singer-songwriter, producer
- Years active: 1995–present
- Labels: Sticky Music, Bright Star, Play It Again Sam
- Website: iainarcher.com

Iain Archer is a Northern Irish writer, producer, singer and songwriter from Bangor. He is a two-time Ivor Novello Award winner, winning the 2004 Album Award – Final Straw by Snow Patrol and Most Performed Work in 2016 for Grammy nominated "Hold Back the River", which he co-wrote with James Bay. Additionally, Archer was a 2013 Ivor Novello Award nominee for Best Song Musically & Lyrically – "Two Fingers" by Jake Bugg.

== Career ==
Archer's music career kicked off in the mid-1990s, releasing two solo albums on Scottish independent label, Sticky Music and touring with artists such as John Martyn & Nils Lofgren. From 2001-2002 he joined Snow Patrol as a guitarist and backing vocalist. Archer co-wrote songs towards the group's breakthrough album Final Straw, including hit "Run", which saw UK top 5 success in 2005 and became a UK No. 1 in 2008 with Leona Lewis. During that time, he also worked with Gary Lightbody in The Reindeer Section alongside members of Belle & Sebastian, Idlewild, Arab Strap, Mogwai, Alfie, and Teenage Fanclub. In 2004, he returned to his solo career, releasing the album Flood the Tanks with PIAS Recordings, and Magnetic North in 2006, co-produced with David Kosten (Bat for Lashes, Everything Everything). Both albums received critical acclaim. His most recent solo album, To the Pine Roots, was released in 2009.

Archer became a member of Tired Pony in 2009, a band comprising Gary Lightbody (Snow Patrol), Peter Buck (R.E.M.), Scott McCaughey (Young Flesh Fellows and Minus 5), Richard Colburn (Belle and Sebastian), Jacknife Lee and Troy Stewart. Tired Pony released their debut record The Place We Ran From in July 2010 which featured contributions from Zooey Deschanel, M Ward, Tom Smith (Editors) and was recorded in Portland, Oregon. They completed their follow-up, titled The Ghost of the Mountain in early 2013, recorded in Topanga Canyon of Southern California.

In 2012, Archer began working alongside Jake Bugg, producing and co-writing a number of tracks on the Mercury Music Prize nominated No.1, debut album Jake Bugg, including singles "Lightning Bolt", "Taste It", "Trouble Town" and "Two Fingers". The follow-up saw the release of Bugg's UK No. 3 second album Shangri La (2013), in which Archer co-wrote eight songs, including "Slumville Sunrise", "What Doesn't Kill You", "Song About Love" and "Messed Up Kids". The album was recorded in Malibu with Rick Rubin. By 2013, "Two Fingers" led to an Ivor Novello Award nomination for Best Song Musically & Lyrically. The two worked together again in 2014 when Archer played guitar on Bugg's Messed Up Kids EP on "The Odds" alongside drummer Chad Smith (Red Hot Chili Peppers).

Archer's career in songwriting continued to see many achievements, working alongside James Bay in 2015, co-writing three tracks on his No.1 album Chaos and the Calm, including "Best Fake Smile", "Craving" and "Hold Back the River" which won the Ivor Novello award for Most Performed Work in 2016, and received a Grammy nomination. In 2017, Archer produced and co-wrote with Liam Gallagher on his No. 1 solo album As You Were and later with Niall Horan (One Direction) on his debut solo album Flicker, co-writing on "Paper Houses", which hit No. 1 in the United States. In 2018, Archer worked with Isaac Gracie, writing and producing on his track "Show Me Love" and then with Lisa Hannigan, co-writing on her track "Undertow", which was produced by Aaron Dessner. In 2019, Archer returned to performing with Snow Patrol, standing in for Nathan Connolly due to a severe hand injury.

Although much of Archer's career has seen success through songwriting and production, his work over the years has branched into broader areas as well. In 2010, he created the soundtrack for the film America's Wildest Refuge: Discovering the Arctic National Wildlife Refuge. He has also shared his expertise in music and songwriting as a visiting professor at Leeds College of Music in 2016 and as a mentor to students at Queen's University Belfast from 2018-2019 as part of the Seamus Heaney Centre fellows. Additionally, as Archer has received his own Ivor Novello Awards over the years, he is currently a member of The Ivors Academy Songwriter Committee.

Archer is married to singer Miriam Kaufmann.
