= The Meaning of Love (disambiguation) =

"The Meaning of Love" is a song by Depeche Mode.

The Meaning of Love may also refer to:

- The Meaning of Love (album), by Michelle McManus
  - "The Meaning of Love" (Michelle McManus song)
- "The Meaning of Love", a song by Joe Satriani from the album Super Colossal
