= Max George =

English singer (born 1988)

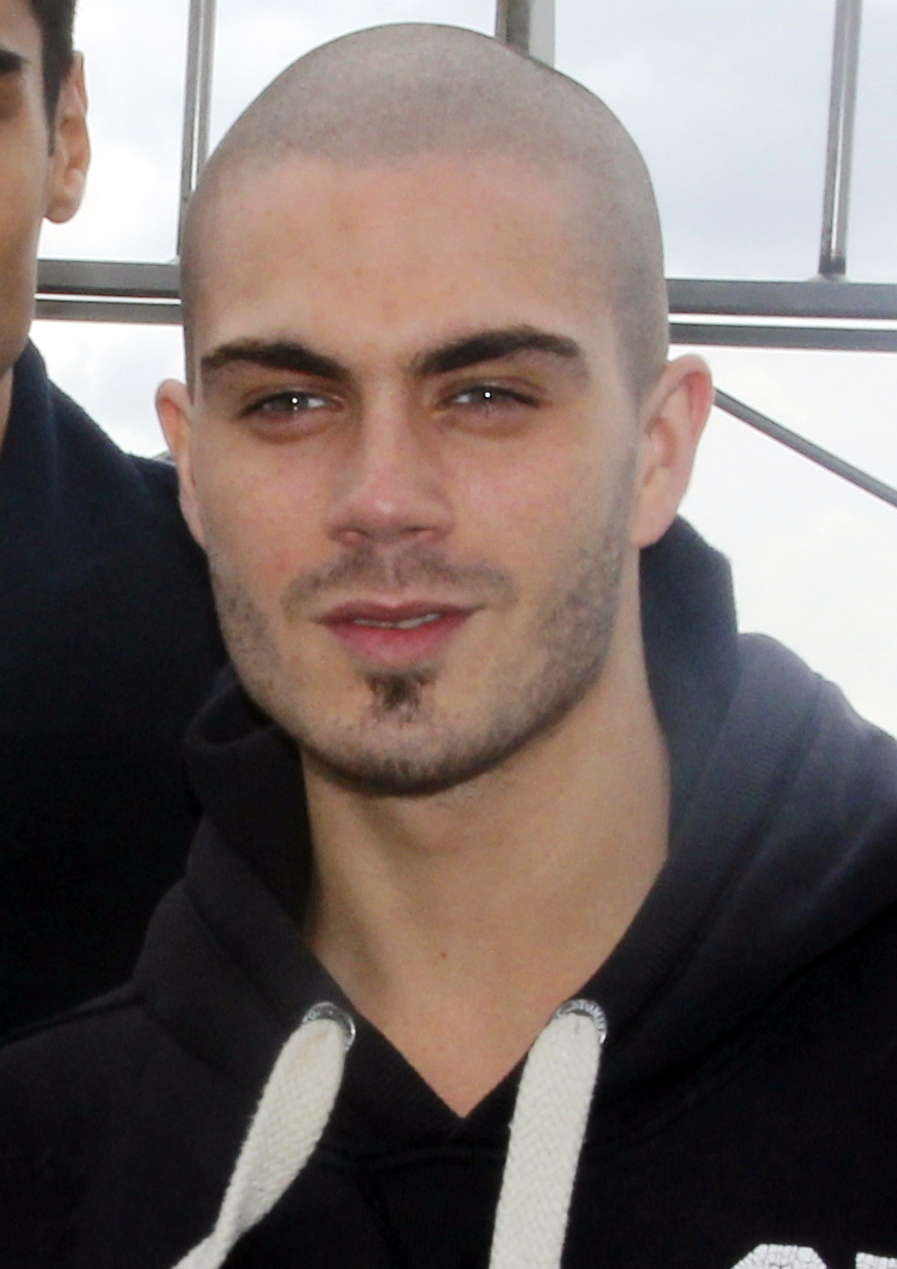
- George in 2012

Background information
- Born: Maximillian Albert George; 6 September 1988 (age 38); Swinton, Greater Manchester, England
- Genres: Pop; synth-pop
- Occupations: Singer; actor
- Years active: 2006–present
- Labels: Geffen; Island; Mercury; Virgin EMI
- Member of: The Wanted
- Formerly of: Avenue
- Partner: Maisie Smith (2022–present)

Maximillian Albert George (born 6 September 1988) is an English singer and actor, known as the lead singer of the boy band The Wanted.

George started his career as a footballer, playing for Preston North End. After an injury ended his football career, he decided to pursue a music career. George made his singing debut with the band Avenue. After the group disbanded in 2009, George joined the newly formed band, The Wanted. In 2014, following The Wanted's success in the United States, he landed his first acting role in the sixth season of the American television series Glee in the role of Clint, the leader of "Vocal Adrenaline".

In 2013, George starred in the E! channel reality series The Wanted Life.

== Early life ==
George was born on 6 September 1988 in Swinton, Greater Manchester, and studied at Bolton School. He was raised in Manchester. Before music, he was a footballer with Preston North End and was on the verge of signing a two-year deal with them. He has been a Manchester City supporter since a young age.

== Music career ==
=== Avenue and The X Factor ===
In 2005 George joined the four-piece boy band Avenue made up of himself, Jonathan Lloyd, Scott Clarke, Ross Candy and Jamie Tinkler. After applying to The X Factor in 2006, the band auditioned for the third series of the competition singing an a cappella version of the Will Young song, "Leave Right Now". They were mentored by Louis Walsh after completing the bootcamp and judges' house portion. Making it to the top 12 contestants, the band then signed a management contract with the series. After it was discovered they were already under contract with another management firm, they were disqualified from the show. Following the disqualification, they were signed to the Crown Music Management recording label and were awarded an album deal with Island Records.

With Andy Brown joining as a member of Avenue replacing Jamie Tinkler, the band went on to have some success beyond their X Factor appearances. In 2008, Avenue released their debut single, "Last Goodbye", which reached number 50 on the UK Singles Chart. Their plans to go on tour were cancelled. They had a follow-up release with "Can You Feel It?." The group disbanded in 2009. In 2008, while still a member of Avenue, George appeared naked on cover of British gay magazine AXM's "Naked Issue" in support of cancer research.

=== The Wanted ===
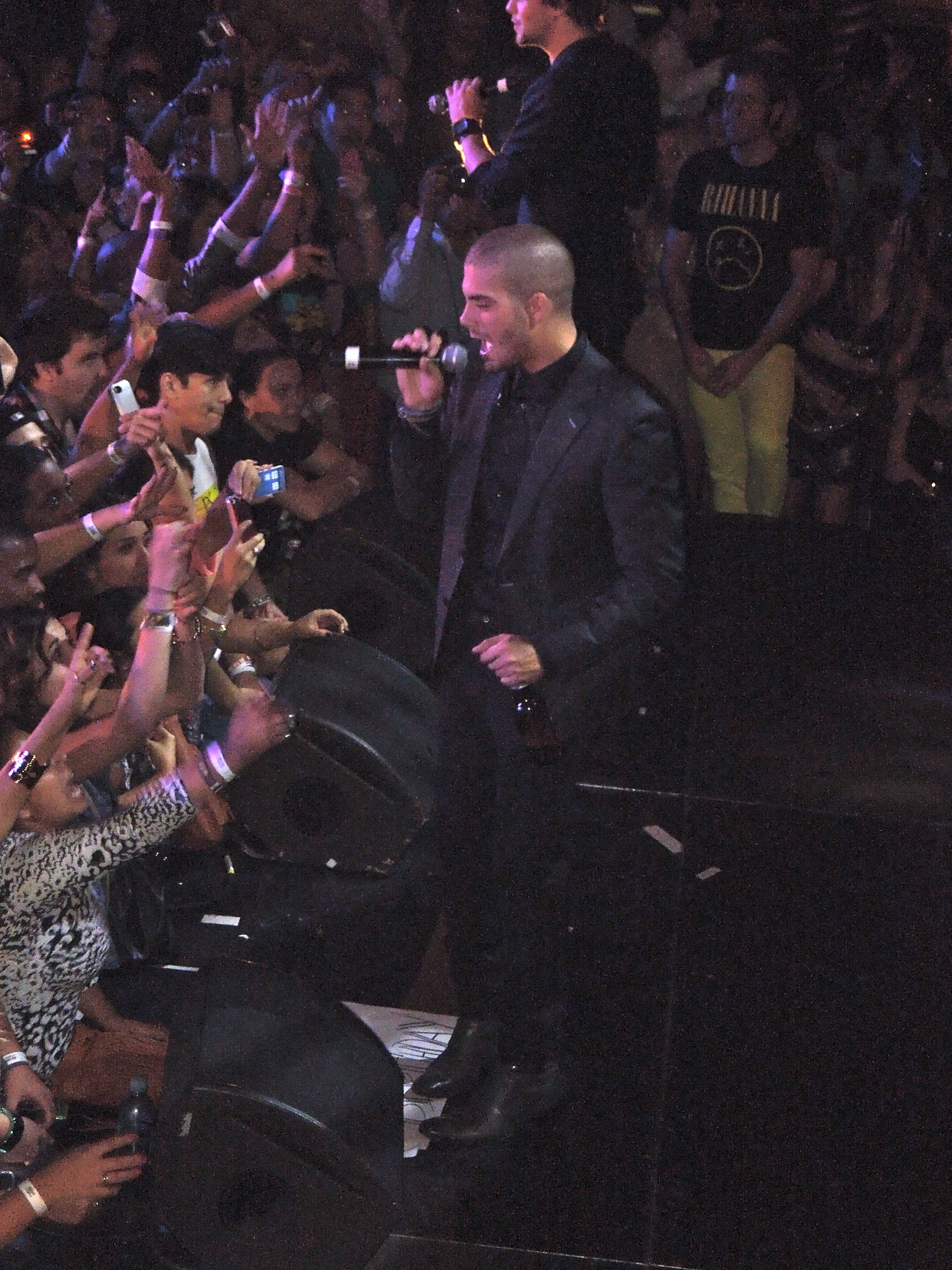
George during a live performance

In 2009, a mass audition was held by Jayne Collins to form a boy band, after successfully launching Parade and The Saturdays. George auditioned and was selected as one of five members, along with Nathan Sykes, Siva Kaneswaran, Tom Parker and Jay McGuiness out of the thousands of others who auditioned. The band was formed and together they worked on their debut album before finding a perfect name for their band, The Wanted. Their debut single "All Time Low" was released on 25 July 2010, debuted at number one on the UK Singles Chart. Their second single, "Heart Vacancy" was released on 17 October 2010. The song hit number two on the UK Singles Chart, and at number 18 in Ireland. Their third single, "Lose My Mind" was released on 26 December 2010. The song peaked number 19 on the UK Singles Chart, and peaked at number 30 in Ireland. In 2011, the single was released in Germany and in 2012, in the United States. In 2013, in support of a crossover appeal to the American music market, the group starred in their own reality series on E!. The series, The Wanted Life only aired for one season.

The band announced their decision to break in January 2014. Max, as a member of the band has sold over 12 million records worldwide.

=== Solo artist ===
In January 2014, George revealed in an interview that he was signed as a solo artist by Scooter Braun. On 3 July 2018 he released his first solo single "Barcelona". The song has more than 4.5 million streams on Spotify. On 24 May 2019 he released his second single "Better On Me".

== Other ventures ==
=== Modelling ===
In June 2013, George was named as the new face and spokesmodel for Buffalo denim's fall line. He starred in the campaign opposite Sports illustrated swimsuit model, Hannah Davis. In November 2013, he did an underwear campaign for Buffalo again.

=== Acting career ===
George is signed with Creative Artists Agency since 2013. In June 2014, George revealed his decision to enroll in elocution classes, to help improve his pursuit of an acting career. In September 2014, it was confirmed that he had joined the cast of Glee in the role of Clint, a bully and the lead vocalist of Vocal Adrenaline, after Mark Salling shared a photo of him on Twitter hanging out with Max on the set of the final season of the US comedy drama. He made his first on screen appearance on 9 January 2015. In April 2024, George was cast as Parson Nathaniel in Jeff Wayne's Musical Version of The War of the Worlds for the 2025 The Spirit of Man tour.

=== Reality television ===
On 2 February 2015, it was announced that George had joined the cast of Bear Grylls' reality televise survival series, Bear Grylls: Mission Survive.

On 1 September 2020, it was announced that George would be taking part in the eighteenth series of Strictly Come Dancing. He was partnered with Australian dancer Dianne Buswell. They were eliminated on week 4 of the competition, finishing in ninth place.

In 2022, he competed in the ITV series The Games. In 2023, he took part in Scared of the Dark on Channel 4.

=== Radio ===
On 7 July 2021, it was announced that George would be joining Hits Radio, presenting Friday Night Hits, every Friday from 7-10pm across the Hits Radio Network. His first show was on 9 July 2021.

== Personal life ==
George was in a relationship with actress Michelle Keegan from December 2010. The couple became engaged in June 2011, but ended their relationship the following year. In October 2013, George confirmed in an interview that he was dating Danish swimwear model Nina Agdal. They split in February 2014. He dated beauty queen Amy Willerton briefly in 2014. In October 2014, he confirmed being in a relationship with Miss Oklahoma contestant Carrie Baker.

In 2018, he began dating Stacey Giggs, but they split in August 2022 after he was embroiled in cheating rumours with Strictly co-star Maisie Smith. In September 2022, his relationship with Smith was confirmed. In December 2024, George was unexpectedly rushed into hospital, after he felt unwell. On 18 December he underwent heart-block surgery, and was fitted with a pacemaker.

== Filmography ==
Year	Title	Role	Notes
2013	Chasing the Saturdays	Himself	Episode: "#DeepFriedSats"
2013	The Wanted Life	Himself	7 episodes
2015	Glee	Clint	Recurring role; 6 episodes
2015	Bear Grylls: Mission Survive	Himself	2 episodes
2020	Me, Myself and Di	Lifeguard	Film
2020	Bloodshore	Gav	FMV Game
2020	Strictly Come Dancing	Himself	Contestant; series 18
2022	Pointless Celebrities	Himself	Contestant
2023	Scared of the Dark	Himself	Contestant
2023	Tipping Point: Lucky Stars	Himself	Contestant
2023	Richard Osman's House of Games	Himself	Contestant

== Discography ==
=== Singles ===
Year	Title
2018	"Barcelona"
2019	"Better On Me"
2019	"Til I Met You"
2020	"That's Not Me"
2020	"Hate You"
2020	"Paint By Numbers"
2020	"Give Yourself To Me"
