= The Meaning of Love (album) =

Studio album by Michelle McManus
- Released: 16 February 2004
- Recorded: 2003–2004
- Genre: Pop
- Length: 53:53
- Labels: 19; S; BMG
- Producers: Steve Mac; Steve Robson; Ronny Janssen; Lars Aass; Andreas Carlsson; Harry Sommerdahl; David Eriksen; Martin Sjølie; James McMillan; Stephen Lipson; Mike Peden

Michelle McManus chronology
| The Meaning of Love (2004) | Michelle McManus' Winter Wonderland (2019) |

Singles from The Meaning of Love
- 1. "All This Time" Released: 5 January 2004; 2. "The Meaning of Love" Released: 5 April 2004

The Meaning of Love is the debut studio album by Scottish singer Michelle McManus, released on 16 February 2004 via BMG, 19 and S. The album was supported by the release of its lead single, "All This Time", which was released in January 2004. A commercial success, it debuted atop the singles charts in both the United Kingdom and her native Scotland, spending three weeks atop the charts and subsequently becoming Silver certified by the British Phonographic Industry (BPI). McManus became the first Scottish female recording artist to have a debut single enter the singles charts in the United Kingdom and number one.

Following the albums release in February 2004, it was supported by a second and final single, the albums title track. It failed to match the prominence experienced by "All This Time", and was a moderate success in both the United Kingdom and Ireland, whilst in Scotland, it debuted at number seven and spent five weeks within the Scottish Singles Charts Top 100. The album was a commercial success, particularly in her native Scotland where it debuted at number one on the national albums chart. In the United Kingdom, it achieved similar commercial prominence, debuting at number three on the UK Albums Chart, whilst it stalled in Ireland, reaching a peak of number sixty-four.

It was initially certified Silver by the British Phonographic Industry (BPI) in the United Kingdom on 2 April 2004, before being awarded Gold certification by the BPI on the same day, indicating sales in excess of 100,000 copies. The album spawned the release of two singles – "All This Time" (5 January 2004) and the title track (5 April 2004).

== Background ==
McManus was announced as the winner of Pop Idol series 2 on 20 December 2003, and was widely criticised by Pop Idol judge Pete Waterman, who described the prospects of McManus becoming a pop star as a "joke". Waterman infamously walked off the judging panel during the broadcast of McManus being announced as the series winner on 20 December 2003. Following her win on the second season of Pop Idol, McManus was signed to the Sony BMG record label, and going under the single name Michelle, her debut single "All This Time" was released on 5 January 2004. The song went straight to number one on the UK Singles Chart, and stayed there for three weeks; it spent eleven weeks inside the UK Top 100. McManus is the first Scottish female to debut at the top of the UK Singles Chart. In Ireland, the song debuted at Number 5 before rising to 2.

== Release ==
The album was released on 16 February 2004, and critics derided the record for its production values and songwriting quality; multiple reviewers also found McManus's singing voice to be unimpressive. The second and final single to be released from the album was the albums title track which failed to match the success McManus experienced with "All This Time". The single reached the top ten on the national singles charts in her native Scotland, debuting at number seven on the Scottish Singles Charts. Elsewhere, the single reached number sixteen on the singles charts in the United Kingdom and number twenty-nine in the Republic of Ireland, spending a total of one week within the Irish Singles Charts. The album was deemed a commercial failure by Sony BMG, who dropped McManus from the label. The album has since received various "worst album" accolades.

Following its release, The Meaning of Love debuted at number one in her native Scotland, spending a total of two weeks at number one and a combined total of ten weeks within the Top 100 of the Scottish Albums Chart. However, across the United Kingdom, it was selling only one sixth of Pop Idol 2002 winner Will Young's debut From Now On. The Meaning of Love debuted at number three on the UK Albums Chart on 22 February 2004. It shifted around 23,000 copies in its first week. It fell to number fourteen in its second week and lasted a further three weeks in the UK Top 40. Overall, it spent a combined total of eight weeks within the Top 100 of the albums chart in the United Kingdom. The album charted at number sixty four on the Irish Albums Chart. In the United Kingdom, The Meaning of Love received a gold certification, indicating sales of over 100,000 copies.

The Meaning of Love was certified as gold by the British Phonographic Industry in April 2004, indicating sales of over 100,000 copies.

== Reception ==
Professional ratings
Review scores
| Source | Rating |
|---|---|
| AllMusic | 2/5 stars |
| entertainment.ie | 2/5 stars |
| Evening Standard | 1/5 stars |
| The Guardian | 2/5 stars |
| The Herald | 1/5 stars |
| The Press | 2/5 stars |
| The Scotsman | 1/5 stars |
| Sunday Herald | 2/5 stars |
| Sunday World | 3/5 stars |
| The Times | 1/5 stars |

Lynsey Hanley in The Telegraph wrote: "This whole record smacks of boil-in-the-bag songwriting and lazy, hasty production tarted up with cheesy strings." She stated that McManus's singing "lack[s] any discernible 'wow' factor" and is on par with "a karaoke regular or, at best, a provincial cabaret turn." Guardian journalist Caroline Sullivan also saw McManus's vocals as lacking the "wow" factor, which, she said, "could have enlivened some of these sub-Celine Dion torchers." An entertainment.ie critic said that McManus, whose vocal performances "never rise far above the level of a very average club singer", made fellow reality television music competition winners Will Young and Alex Parks "look like worldbeaters by comparison."

McManus' native Scottish broadsheet press were not sympathetic. Leon McDermott of the Sunday Herald called the music "singularly unremarkable." He likened McManus to a "particularly adept ferry singer", while observing a lack of "emotion and anger, love and regret." In conclusion he said: "[S]he's competent, but sounds like a proficient karaoke singer rather than a bona fide pop star." Herald journalist Beth Pearson felt that the "tinny production and synths imported direct from the 1980s", made for a "thoroughly boring, unambitious debut." While The Scotsman's Fiona Shepherd delivered a track-by-track assessment of the record in which she criticised the quality of the material and described McManus as "another chicken-in-a-basket diva" with an "unremarkable" voice. Shepherd expressed a particular loathing for the cover version of Nina Simone's "Feelin' Good", which according to her, had "the guts ripped out of it." The track was derided by multiple reviewers.

Some reviewers, while unfavourable, were more receptive to McManus's vocals. Sharon Mawer in AllMusic saw the bulk of the material as "very bland, tuneless, and unmemorable", but commended McManus's "undoubted talent." She did, however, argue that McManus gained publicity more for "her outsized weight" than her singing. Daily Mirror critic Gavin Martin stressed that she "can actually sing", but observed "some of the most horrifying material ever", with songwriting that is "drowned in cliche, seemingly knocked off with barely a thought." BBC News writer Tom Bishop was impressed by McManus's "soulful" singing on Pop Idol, but felt her vocals sound "muffled and restrained by pedestrian production" on this "dull" album.

== Legacy ==
Deviating from critical consensus, BBC Music journalist Ruth Mitchell wrote that the album is "packed full of dreamy songs", and "surprisingly sounds like a very competent and unhurried effort indeed." The Meaning of Love won "Worst British Album" at the 2005 Naomi Awards. In a 2007 online poll, it was voted the seventh-worst album ever made by a Scottish artist.

== Track listing ==
The Meaning of Love track listing
| No. | Title | Writer(s) | Producer(s) | Length |
|---|---|---|---|---|
| 1. | "All This Time" | Steve Mac; Wayne Hector; Ali Tennant | Mac | 4:22 |
| 2. | "The Meaning of Love" | Karen Poole; Steve Robson | Robson | 4:24 |
| 3. | "Say It Isn't So" | Bottolf Lødemel; Lars Aass | Ronny Janssen; Lars Aass | 4:30 |
| 4. | "Emotional" | Andreas Carlsson; Desmond Child; Chris Braide | Carlsson; Harry Sommerdahl | 3:15 |
| 5. | "When the World Is Not Enough" | Cathy Dennis; Jonathan Shorten | David Eriksen; Martin Sjølie | 3:43 |
| 6. | "Too Fast Too Slow" | Joanne Jeffries; Steve Welton-Jaimes; Juliette Jaimes | James McMillan | 3:32 |
| 7. | "Cast the First Stone" | Ciaron Bell; Danielle Perkins; Sean Phillips | Stephen Lipson | 3:36 |
| 8. | "One Life" | Dennis; Simon Ellis | Lipson | 3:36 |
| 9. | "Feelin' Good" | Anthony Newley; Leslie Bricusse | McMillan | 3:14 |
| 10. | "How Can Sorry Ever Mend a Broken Heart" | Steve Kipner; Dane DeViller; Sean Hosein | McMillan | 3:08 |
| 11. | "Invincible" | Diane Warren | Robson | 4:43 |
| 12. | "I'll Never Know" | Gary Barlow; Lucie Silvas | McMillan | 4:19 |
| 13. | "More Than Anything" | Dennis; Thomas Nichols; Tim Woodcock | Lipson | 3:25 |
| 14. | "Once in a Lifetime" | Lindy Robbins; Peter Gordeno; Alex Cantrell; Mike Peden | Peden | 4:06 |
| Total length: | | | | 53:53 |

== Charts ==
Chart performance for The Meaning of Love
| Chart (2004) | Peak position |
|---|---|
| Scottish Albums (OCC) | 1 |
| UK Albums (OCC) | 3 |
| Irish Albums (IRMA) | 64 |

== Certifications ==
Certifications for The Meaning of Love
| Region | Certification | Certified units/sales |
|---|---|---|
| United Kingdom (BPI) | Gold | 100,000^{^} |
^{^} Shipments figures based on certification alone.
