= Jamie Tinkler =

English singer and songwriter

- Born: 28 January 1982 (age 44)
- Genres: Pop
- Occupations: Singer; songwriter
- Instrument: Vocals
- Years active: 1970–present

Jamie Tinkler is an English singer and songwriter. He has had record deals with Jive, Sony/BMG along with Universal Records. Jamie was a contestant on the Eurovision Song for Europe contest, performing live on BBC, and made it to the final 50 of Pop Idol 2003. He had three top 20 UK chart hits with girl/boy band Pop! and was an X Factor finalist with boyband Avenue in 2006.

== In band Level Best for Eurovision ==
In 2002, Jamie Tinkler entered the British qualifying competition for Eurovision Song Contest and was part of Level Best, chosen as one of four finalists alongside Surf 'n' Turf (featuring Jonathan Maitland), Tricia Penrose and Pop Idol contestant / finalist Jessica Garlick.

Jamie Tinkler performed with Level Best the song "Every Step of the Way" written by Graham Kearns and Howard New. Garlick won by 70% of the votes. Tinkler and Level Best finished third.

== In Pop Idol ==
In 2003, he applied to series 2 of Pop Idol reaching the qualifying semi-finals but did not make it to the final 12 of the competition.

== In band Pop! ==
In 2003, Jamie Tinkler became a member of the band Pop! composed of Glenn Ball, Hannah Lewis, and Jade McGuire in addition to Tinkler. The group had three top twenty UK Chart hits and was put together in the summer of 2003 when they were signed by Pete Waterman. to record label Jive the same label as Justin Timberlake, OUTKAST and Brittany Spears.

Pop! released three singles on the Sony/BMG record label, including "Heaven and Earth" (reached No. 14), "Can't Say Goodbye" (reached No. 20) from 2004 and "Serious" (reached No. 16) in 2005. Pop! disbanded in early 2005 after it was revealed Jade McGuire was expecting her first child, the label didn't feel the project could continue with a replacement member.

== In band Avenue ==
After one year from split up of Pop!, Jamie joined in 2006 the boy band Avenue that was applying for The X Factor. The group consisted of Max George (now a member of British boy band The Wanted), Jonathan (Jonny) Lloyd, Scott Clarke, Ross Candy and Jamie Tinkler himself. This was Tinkler's third major competition experience after having taken part in Eurovision qualifications and Pop Idol three years earlier. They auditioned by singing an a cappella version of "Leave Right Now", a song by Will Young. Avenue made it through bootcamp landing in the final four in Louis Walsh's category. But after Walsh discovered that Jonathan Lloyd, Jamie Tinkler, Max George, Scott Clarke and Ross Candy were already on a management deal, he disqualified them from the competition, giving Eton Road a chance instead. It was later revealed that Avenue had in fact not broken any rules they had a management deal not a record deal, competition winner Leona Lewis was also represented with a management deal but didn't suffer the same scrutiny.

The band decided to go on with their musical career and found management with then Sugababes management Crown Music, Tinkler however said that he was opting out of the project following a fall out with fellow band member Max George and would not continue with Avenue. He was replaced by Andrew (Andy) Brown. Avenue went on to release only one single which charted with a disappointing number 50 in the UK charts.

== 2014–present ==
It was announced that Avenue would be returning after four years on hiatus, with the following members Jonny Lloyd, Ross Candy and Scott Clarke.

Instead, Tinkler joined in an indie rock band named Baxter, through Baxter guitarist Steve Keegan.

Currently performing across the UK with his 80s solo show and seasonal Christmas shows for corporate events.
