= All This Time (Michelle McManus song) =

2003 single by Michelle McManus

Single by Michelle

from the album The Meaning of Love
- B-side: "On the Radio"
- Released: 5 January 2004
- Recorded: 2003
- Genre: Pop
- Length: 4:23
- Label: 19; S; BMG
- Songwriters: Steve Mac; Wayne Hector; Ali Tennant
- Producer: Steve Mac

Michelle singles chronology
"All This Time" (2004)	"The Meaning of Love" (2004)

"All This Time" is a song by Scottish singer Michelle McManus, released as the lead single from her debut album, The Meaning of Love (2004). Written and produced by Steve Mac, with additional songwriting credits from Wayne Hector and Ali Tennant, the single was released in January 2004 by 19, a subsidiary of BMG. Described by the Official Charts Company as having "all the ingredients for a champion's debut", it praised its dramatic intro and lyrical composition.

Released immediately following her Pop Idol win, it debuted atop the national singles charts in both the United Kingdom and her native Scotland, selling 118,000 copies in its first week of release and spending three weeks at the top of the singles charts. It became the sixth-best-selling single of the year in the United Kingdom. As a result, McManus became the first female Scottish recording artist to debut atop the singles charts in the United Kingdom with a debut single.

== Background and recording ==
"All This Time" was written for the winner of the second and final series of Pop Idol in the United Kingdom, with last two acts in the show, Michelle McManus and Mark Rhodes, having both performed the song in the final. McManus went on to win and released "All This Time" as her debut single on 5 January 2004. Given the fact that the song was originally written for the winner of Pop Idol made it rare, as the winner of Pop Idol series 1, Will Young, was only permitted to release a cover version of the Westlife song "Evergreen" for his winners single.

The song was written by Steve Mac, Wayne Hector and Ali Tennant who had achieved commercial success with songs written for popular acts at the time such as Westlife, Atomic Kitten and Blue. Lyrically, "All This Time" focuses on an individuals dreams and achieving life goals, and is noted for having "a signature 00s pop key change". McManus was announced as the winner of Pop Idol series 2 on 20 December 2003, and was widely criticised by Pop Idol judge Pete Waterman, who described the prospects of McManus becoming a pop star as a "joke". Waterman infamously walked off the judging panel during the broadcast of McManus being announced as the series winner on 20 December 2003.

== Release and promotion ==
The single was released on 5 January 2004 via 19 Recordings and Bertelsmann Music Group. McManus was involved in heavy promotion for the release of the single, performing the song on BBC's Top of the Pops, as well as appearing on the 2004 Christmas edition of Top of the Pops in December 2004. Additional promotional appearances included a live performance of the song on CD:UK. In the United Kingdom, it debuted at number one on the UK Singles Charts, selling a total of 118,000 copies in its first week of release. It went onto spend a combined total of three weeks at number one in the United Kingdom. As of 2019, "All This Time" had sold an estimated 305,000 copies in the United Kingdom alone. The song kept "Milkshake" by American singer Kelis off the top spot for the fourth week running. The song spent a combined total of eleven weeks within the Top 100 of the UK Singles Charts. The song ended 2004 as the sixth best selling single of the year in the United Kingdom.

In her native Scotland, "All This Time" also debuted at number one on the Scottish Singles Charts on 11 January 2004, knocking off "Mad World" by Gary Jules and Michael Andrews, and remained at the top spot in Scotland for three weeks before falling to number two in its fourth week behind "Take Me to the Clouds Above" by LMC and U2. In the Republic of Ireland, it debuted at number two on the Irish Singles Charts on 8 January 2004, spending a total of eight weeks within the singles charts in the Republic of Ireland. On the Eurochart Hot 100, "All This Time" debuted at number three.

"All This Time" was certified Silver by the British Phonographic Industry (BPI) on 22 July 2013. It featured on the UK compilation album Now That's What I Call Music! 57 released in April 2004.

== Critical reception ==
BBC Music writer Ruth Mitchell described the song as "epic", with a "glorious array of lush harmonies". A Daily Record journalist called it "beautiful" and a "brilliant pop gem which is laced with a luxurious gospel feel". Ian Hyland in the Sunday Mirror unfavourably compared McManus to previous Pop Idol winner Will Young but nevertheless rated the single 7/10.

Conversely, Fiona Shepherd in The Scotsman described the track as a "tuneless dirge", while an Entertainment.ie critic labelled it "a triumph of hype over substance". Daily Telegraph critic Lynsey Hanley called the song "utterly forgettable" and "one of the lamest Pop Idol-sponsored efforts" and argued that it achieved the UK number-one position "on the back of the series' success".

== Music video ==
The music video for "All This Time" was recorded in December 2003 and was released to UK Music Channels that same month. The video shows Michelle singing the song in front of a pure black background whilst wearing a black dress. Throughout the music video, McManus appears in front of the background performing the song, whilst at other points in the video, it also shows broadcast clips from Michelle's time on the second series of Pop Idol.

== Track listing ==
European CD single

1. "All This Time"
2. "On the Radio"

== Charts ==
=== Weekly charts ===
Chart (2003–2004)	Peak position
Europe (Eurochart Hot 100)	3
Ireland (IRMA)	2
Scottish Singles Sales (Official Charts)	1
UK Singles (Official Charts)	1

=== Year-end charts ===
Chart (2004)	Position
UK Singles (OCC)	6

== Certifications ==
Region	Certification	Certified units/sales
United Kingdom (BPI)	Silver	200,000^{^}
^{^} Shipments figures based on certification alone.
