= Michelle McManus =

Scottish singer-songwriter, columnist, and actress

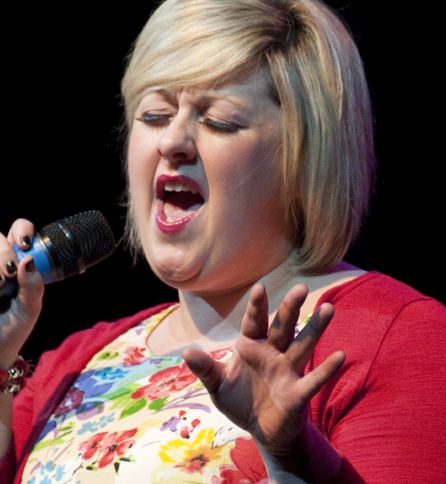
- McManus performing at the Glasgow East Woman of the Year, 2010

Background information
- Born: 8 May 1980 (age 46); Glasgow, Scotland
- Origin: Baillieston, Scotland
- Genres: Pop
- Occupations: Singer; columnist; television presenter; radio broadcaster
- Instrument: Vocals
- Years active: 2003–present
- Labels: Sony BMG, 19, S (2003–2005); McManni (2007–present)

Michelle McManus (born 8 May 1980) is a Scottish singer, columnist, radio broadcaster and television presenter who won the second and final series of the UK talent show Pop Idol in 2003. She formerly presented the Afternoon radio show broadcast on BBC Radio Scotland, and is the host of The Entertainment Mix (2024–present) which airs on BBC Scotland. In January 2004, McManus became the first Scottish female artist to debut atop the UK Singles Chart with a debut single.

McManus's debut single, "All This Time", entered the UK Singles Chart at number one in January 2004. Her debut album, The Meaning of Love, was released in February 2004, and debuted at number one on the Scottish Albums Charts and number three on the UK Albums Chart. Later that year, BMG dropped McManus from the label, and in 2007 she founded her own record label, McMannii Records. Later that year, McManus released a promotional single, "Just For You" from her then upcoming second album Dancing to a Different Beat, which was scheduled for release in 2008, but the release was eventually shelved. A return to music in 2012 saw the release of "Take You There", a duet with Mànran, which reached number seventy on the Scottish Singles Charts, and in 2017, McManus was a featured vocalist as part of the Choirs with Purpose release "We All Stand Together".

From 2009 to 2011, McManus was a co-presenter of STV's lifestyle magazine show The Hour, originally alongside Stephen Jardine and later Tam Cowan. She was also a columnist for the Glasgow Times until 2018. In 2019, McManus released her second album, the Christmas inspired Michelle McManus' Winter Wonderland, featuring the SoundSational Community Choir. In 2023, McManus released the single "Christmas Glow", and featured in a BBC Scotland documentary highlighting her Pop Idol win in 2003 and subsequent career titled Michelle McManus: Talent Show Winners.

== Early life ==
Michelle McManus was born in 1980 in Glasgow, Scotland to John and Helen McManus, and is the oldest of five sisters. Before auditioning for Pop Idol, McManus lived in the Glasgow district of Baillieston, to the east of the city with her parents and sisters.

== Career ==
=== 2003: Pop Idol ===
In early 2003, McManus auditioned for the second season of Pop Idol, along with thousands of other aspiring singers from around the UK. Of the four judges, Pete Waterman in particular was critical as to whether she could make a career in the music industry, mainly due to her fuller figure appearance. However, she was the favourite of Simon Cowell, and after being put through to the semi-final stages, the public voted McManus into the top twelve, though she entered the finals as the bookmaker's rank-outsider. Throughout the finals, McManus was in the bottom three only once, and on 20 December 2003, she was declared the winner of Pop Idol.

==== Performances on Pop Idol ====
Week	Theme	Song	Original artist	Result
Heat 1	—N/a	"Don't Be a Stranger"	Dina Carroll	Advanced
Top 12	Your pop idol	"All by Myself"	Eric Carmen	Safe
Top 10	Birthyear songs	"On the Radio"	Donna Summer	Safe
Top 8	Elton John songs	"Your Song"	Elton John	Bottom 3
Top 7	Disco	"If I Can't Have You"	Yvonne Elliman	Safe
Top 6	The Beatles	"Hey Jude"	The Beatles	Safe
Top 5	Big band	"Feeling Good"	Nina Simone	Safe
Top 4	Christmas songs	"Merry Christmas Everyone"	Shakin' Stevens	Safe
Top 4	Christmas songs	"Oh Holy Night"	Adolphe Adam	Safe
Top 3	Judges' choice	"I Say a Little Prayer"	Aretha Franklin	Safe
Top 3	Judges' choice	"Without You"	Harry Nilsson	Safe
Final	Contestant's choice	"On the Radio"	Donna Summer	Winner
Final	B-side	"The Meaning of Love"	Original song Michelle McManus	Winner
Final	Winner's single	"All This Time"	Michelle McManus	Winner

==== Criticism ====
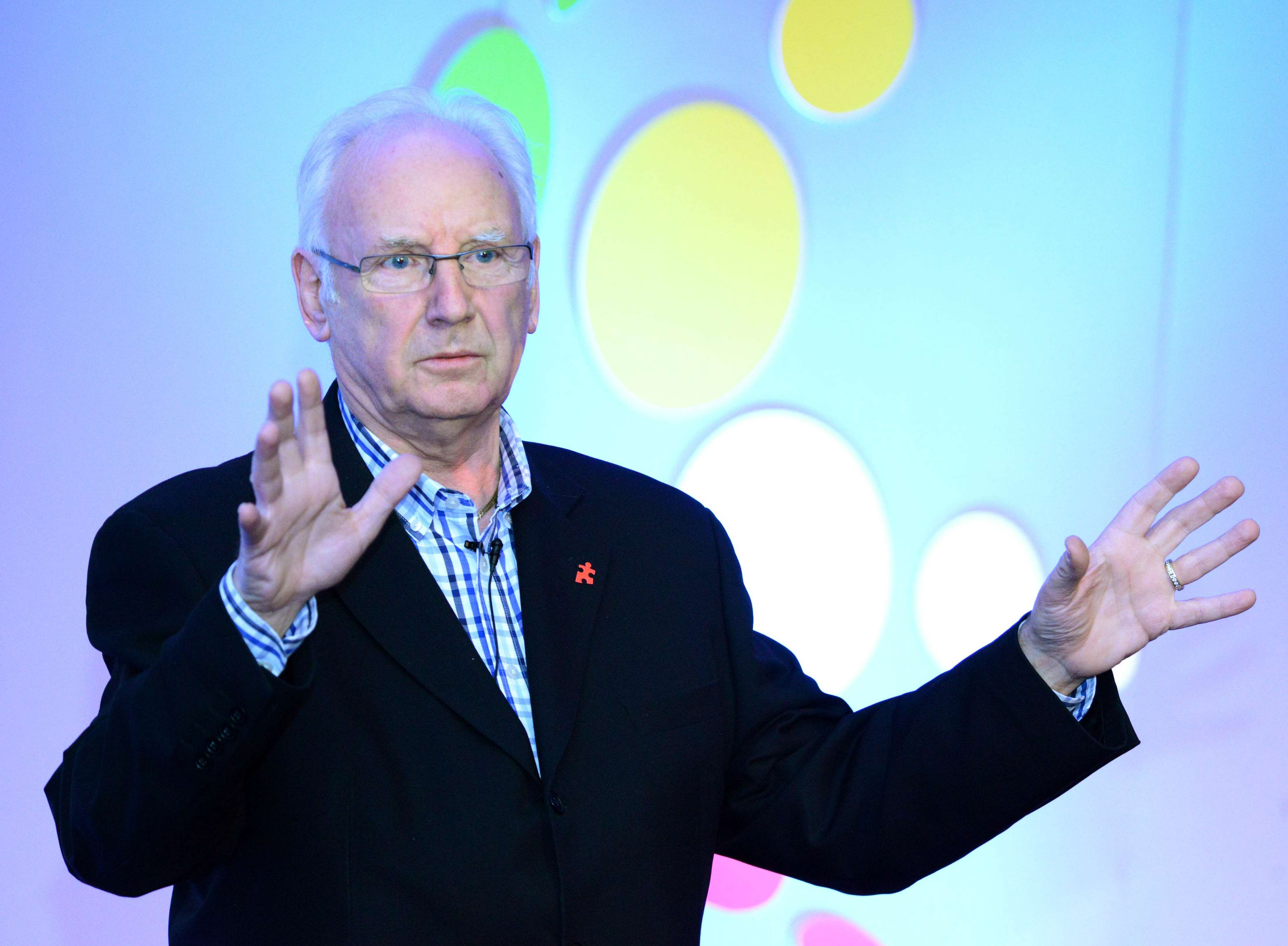
Record producer and Pop Idol judge, Pete Waterman, was highly critical of McManus and her subsequent win

When McManus won the competition, judge Pete Waterman stormed off the Pop Idol set in protest; he later branded her "rubbish". Louis Walsh, a judge of sister show Popstars: The Rivals, was bewildered by McManus's victory, and lamented that "we have to give her, her 15 minutes [of fame]."

Scotsman reporter Fiona Shepherd said of the win: "McManus's victory was not some triumph of talent over image – the very opposite, in fact... If she was a modelesque girl with as unremarkable a voice, the voting public would not have cared." George Tyndale in the Sunday Mercury expressed similar sentiments, arguing that McManus won because of the "fat vote". He disapproved of her professed satisfaction with her weight as well as her elevation to celebrity status, writing: "The harm this has done is incalculable. Lives may, quite literally, be at stake."

Daily Telegraph journalist Viktoria Tolstoy said McManus's victory "seemed to suggest that the pool of talent available to the judges is seriously diminishing". An Entertainment.ie critic labelled McManus the weakest winner of the Pop Idol series and wrote that she made fellow reality television music competition winners Will Young and Alex Parks "look like worldbeaters by comparison".

=== 2003–2007: The Meaning of Love and radio ===
Following her win on the second season of Pop Idol, McManus was signed to the Sony BMG record label, and going under the single name Michelle, her debut single "All This Time" was released between late 2003 and early 2004. The song went straight to number one on the UK Singles Chart, and stayed there for three weeks; it spent eleven weeks inside the UK Top 100. McManus is the first Scottish female to debut at the top of the UK Singles Chart. In Ireland, the song debuted at Number 5 before rising to 2. Her debut album The Meaning of Love, was released on 16 February 2004 and peaked at number three on the UK Albums Chart, number one on the Scottish Albums Chart, and number 64 on the Irish Albums Chart. It went on to receive a gold certification from the British Phonographic Industry for sales of over 100,000 in the UK. The title track of the album was released as the second single, however it peaked at number 16 on the UK chart and number 29 in Ireland, while reaching number seven on the Scottish Singles Chart. As a result of disappointing record sales, McManus was dropped by her label.

McManus performing "All This Time" on the Christmas special of Top of the Pops, 2004

On 22 June 2005, McManus appeared on a 60-minute television special of You Are What You Eat with the author and TV personality Gillian McKeith in a bid to lose weight. A follow-up was broadcast on 13 December 2005, which profiled McManus and her weight loss since the last programme. McManus released a book in December 2005 titled You Are What You Eat: Michelle's Diary. The book documented her journey from winning Pop Idol to appearing on You Are What You Eat, with particular reference to her weight issues and subsequent slimming. Further to this, in December 2006 McManus released a DVD called The Life Plan, a guide to healthy living, exercise and eating.

In September 2005, McManus appeared in an episode of the BBC One holiday magazine programme Departure Lounge. In July 2005, it was announced that McManus had parted company with her management company 19 Entertainment, 19 months after winning Pop Idol. She then went on to sign with Sanctuary Entertainment. During a 2007 appearance on ITV's Loose Women, McManus stated that she believed that she was dropped due to her weight, as her record company could not build any merchandise around her image.

In 2006, McManus began guest-presenting on the Scottish radio station Clyde 1, and then gained her own regular Saturday show on the station. McManus then hosted two series of the BBC Radio Scotland show titled Let's Do the Show Right Here. On television, McManus announced the Scottish votes during the Making Your Mind Up 2006 programme in March 2006, and in November 2006 she was a reporter on Children in Need live from Scotland. In June 2006, McManus performed in the theatre production, The Vagina Monologues, a role which she has subsequently repeated for various tours.

=== 2007–2009: Dancing to a Different Beat ===
In 2007 she made two appearances on the television show Loose Women. In November 2007 a single, "Just for You", was released. It was intended to be on her second album, Dancing to a Different Beat, which remains unreleased. In August 2007, McManus guest-starred as herself in an episode of the BBC sitcom Still Game. In December 2007, McManus was seen in a run of the musical Discotivity at the Arts Theatre in London's West End. In January 2008 she toured Asia in a theatre production of The Rise and Fall of Little Voice.

=== 2009–2012: The Hour and presenting ===
McManus appeared regularly as a guest co-host of the weekday Scottish lifestyle TV programme The Hour during the summer of 2009. In October 2009, McManus became a permanent main presenter alongside Stephen Jardine. The programme was relaunched in September 2011 as a weekly peak-time programme, with McManus co-hosting with new presenter Tam Cowan, but was axed after four weeks due to low viewership. In addition to The Hour, McManus has also presented Hogmanay programming for STV, including the 2009 documentary special Scotland's Always Had Talent and a year later, The Midnight Hour, a pre-recorded special edition of The Hour.

McManus in 2009 at the beginning of his tenure as co–host on The Hour (2009–2011)

Her programme for BBC Alba, Is Mise Michelle McManus, was shown on Christmas Day 2011 with a second programme for BBC Alba, Michelle at the Mod, broadcast on Christmas Day 2013. In September 2010, McManus was one of the performers for Pope Benedict XVI at a ticketed Mass of the Feast of Saint Ninian in Bellahouston Park, as part of the Pope's state visit to the United Kingdom. McManus was a columnist for the Glasgow Evening Times, up until 2018, and was a judge for the papers Glasgow's Star Turn talent contest in 2012.

=== 2012–2023: Second album and Our Lives ===
In September 2012, McManus was one of the artists on the single by Mànran, "Take You There" as the official single of the 2012 STV Children's Appeal. It reached number 70 on the Scottish Singles Chart. Since 2012, McManus has performed her one-woman shows at the Edinburgh Festival. This trilogy of shows, comprising "Michelle at the Musicals", "Reloaded" and "Pop Goes the Idol", was co-written by McManus with Bruce Devlin. From 2013 to 2017, she toured "Musicals" and "Reloaded" in Scotland and Northern England. In 2014, she performed with Rod Stewart at the Ovo Hydro in Glasgow to celebrate fifty years of the Lisbon Lions, and in the same year performed with Lulu as part of the 2014 Commonwealth Games.

McManus paid tribute and sang two songs at Martyn Hett's funeral on 30 June 2017. Martyn was one of the 22 victims of the Manchester bombing on 22 May 2017. In late 2017, McManus recorded a cover version of "We All Stand Together" along with Choirs with Purpose in an attempt to reach the Christmas number one spot on the UK Singles Charts. In January 2018, McManus was a guest panellist on Loose Women. In July 2020, she presented a show for BBC Radio Scotland titled Our Lives. In December 2019, McManus released her second studio album, a Christmas album in collaboration with the SoundSational Community Choir titled Michelle McManus' Winter Wonderland. The album was released via her independent record label, McMannii, and was made available for digital download and on streaming services.

=== 2023–present: Christmas single and BBC Scotland ===
McManus released a Christmas single in 2023, "Christmas Glow", to mark 20 years since her win on Pop Idol in 2003. The single is the first release in six years by McManus. To promote the release, McManus engaged in promotional appearances, including on Loose Women, where she also confirmed that she had been working on a documentary to showcase her Pop Idol win and the twenty years which followed with BBC Scotland. "Christmas Glow" reached number twenty-six on the downloads chart on iTunes. The BBC Scotland documentary, Michelle McManus: Talent Show Winners, was broadcast on the BBC Scotland channel in December 2023, reflecting on her career since Pop Idol, and UK talent show history. The documentary features interviews with Robbie Williams, Susan Boyle and Jai McDowall. McManus additionally hosted a Hogmanay show in Scotland titled Get the Tunes On on BBC Scotland.

McManus commemorated Scottish poet Robert Burns in 2024, and had indicated touring her debut album, The Meaning of Love, twenty years after its release after she was not given the opportunity when the album was originally released due to being dropped by her record company and management. In September 2024, McManus began hosting the weekly entertainment show The Entertainment Mix on the BBC Scotland channel. Additionally, on 21 October, she began hosting a radio show on BBC Radio Scotland on Mondays through to Thursdays. In March 2025, it was confirmed that McManus would join Robbie Williams for the Edinburgh performance during his tour later that year.

In December 2025, she featured in a BBC Scotland Christmas special, A Christmas Choir with Michelle McManus, where she was joined by two choirs – Rock Choir and Jordanhill School Choir. In April 2026, she featured in a special documentary highlighting her journey to Rome in Italy, sharing a "new hymn" from Scotland to Rome. In April 2026, it was announced by BBC Scotland that McManus would be leaving the broadcaster as a result of proposed changes to on-air presenting teams, with her last radio broadcast airing on 29 May 2026.

== Personal life ==
McManus married Jeff Nimmo on 23 September 2017. They have two children. McManus had a "brief" friendship with recording artist Robbie Williams following her Pop Idol win in 2003, with McManus claiming that Williams showed her "kindness at a time when I really needed it". Following this, Williams and McManus lost contact until 2022. After meeting Williams backstage following one of his concerts, Williams invited McManus to his home to participate in her Talent Show Winners documentary, where McManus said that Williams befriended her in 2003 as he "was getting battered in the press at the same time I was", further adding that Williams said he had "never seen someone take the battering I did".

McManus became known for her weight and appearance during her Pop Idol tenure, and McManus has credited her weight for lack of promotion and has said that she "felt hated in the media". McManus has since lost a considerable amount of weight, which she claims was for her children.

== Concert tours ==
Supporting

- Robbie Williams – Britpop Tour (Edinburgh only; 2025)

== Discography ==
=== Studio albums ===
Title	Details	Peak chart positions			Certifications (sales threshold)
Title	Details	SCO	UK	IRE	Certifications (sales threshold)
The Meaning of Love	Released: 16 February 2004; Label: Sony BMG, 19 Recordings, Syco Music; Formats: CD, digital download	1	3	64	BPI: Gold
Michelle McManus' Winter Wonderland	Released: 1 December 2019; Label: McMannii; Formats: Streaming, digital download	—	—	—	

=== Compilation albums ===
- Pop Idol: The Idols – Xmas Factor (2003)

=== Singles ===
==== As lead artist ====
Year	Title	Peak chart positions			Certifications	Album
Year	Title	SCO	UK	IRE	Certifications	Album
2003	"Merry Xmas (War Is Over)" (with Idols)	4	5	—		Pop Idol: The Idols – Xmas Factor
2003	"All This Time"	1	1	2	BPI: Silver	The Meaning of Love
2004	"The Meaning of Love"	7	16	29		The Meaning of Love
2012	"Take You There" (with Mànran)	70	—	—		Charity singles
2023	"Christmas Glow"	—	—	—		Charity singles
"—" denotes a recording that did not chart or was not released.

==== As featured artist ====
Year	Title	Album
2011	"Hold Me" (Tom Urie featuring Michelle McManus)	Tom Urie
2017	"We All Stand Together" (Choirs with Purpose featuring Michelle McManus)	Stand Together

=== Promotional singles ===
Year	Title	Album
2007	"Just for You"	Non-album single

== TV appearances and filmography ==
Film
Year	Film	Role	Notes
2005	You Are What You Eat	Herself	After her time on the show, McManus released a diary Michelle's Diary in 2005.
2007	Still Game	Herself	McManus appears in the 2007 episode "Second's Out" as herself
2009–2011	The Hour	Co-host	Initially appearing as a guest-host, McManus was made permanent co-host in September 2009.
2009	Scotland's Always Had Talent	Host	McManus hosts STV's main Hogmanay programme, leading into the New Year.
2010	The Midnight Hour	Co-host	McManus once again hosts STV's main Hogmanay programme, alongside Stephen Jardine.
2011	STV Children's Appeal	Co-host	McManus appeared on "The Big Live" as a presenter and reporter, usually in amongst the studio audience.
2013	Swing into 2014	Host	McManus once again hosts STV's main Hogmanay programme, from The Tron Theatre in Glasgow.
2018	Loose Women	Guest panellist	McManus was a guest panellist on Loose Women on 22 January 2018.
2023	Michelle McManus: Talent Show Winners	Presenter	BBC Scotland documentary highlighting Pop Idol win and subsequent career. Co–featuring Robbie Williams, Susan Boyle and Jai McDowall.
2023	Get the Tunes On	Presenter	BBC Scotland Hogmanay show
2024–present	The Entertainment Mix	Presenter	BBC Scotland entertainment talk show. McManus also focuses on Scottish culture and the arts, including festivals, gigs and performances occurring across Scotland.
2025	RuPaul's Drag Race UK	Special guest	McManus appears as a special celebrity guest during a makeover challenge (episode "The Hun Makeover").
2025	A Christmas Choir with Michelle McManus	Lead guest	BBC Scotland Christmas special, where McManus is joined by two choirs – Rock Choir and Jordanhill School Choir.
2026	Michelle McManus Sings for the Pope	Herself	BBC Scotland special, documenting the recording process of a new hymn to be presented to Pope Leo from Scotland.
