= Pop! (British group) =

British pop group

- Origin: London, England
- Genres: Pop
- Years active: 2003–2005
- Labels: Sony BMG
- Past members: Glenn Ball; Hannah Lewis; Jamie Tinkler; Jade McGuire

Pop! were a British pop group consisting of Glen Ball, Hannah Lewis, Jamie Tinkler, and Jade McGuire. The group was formed in the summer of 2003 when they were signed by Pete Waterman. They released three singles on the Sony BMG record label, but disbanded in early 2005.

The group had three hit singles, which all reached the top 40 in the UK Singles Chart during 2004 and 2005, but each performed under expectations. Their debut single "Heaven and Earth" was withdrawn from the chart because the single contained a track whose length was longer than permitted for that format. Following singles were "Can't Say Goodbye" and "Serious". A fourth single, "Xanadu" (a cover of the Olivia Newton-John and Electric Light Orchestra song), was due to be released but was cancelled when the group split. They had also recorded songs for a planned studio album. Their single "Heaven and Earth" was licensed for use in Dancing Stage Fusion by Konami in 2005.

== Group members ==
Glenn Ball

- Glenn Ball (born 27 June 1985 (age 39)), a professional choreographer was a backing dancer for Mimi, in the A Song For Europe contest in 2003, with her song "Ever Since That Night" which ended third in the televoting.
- Since then, Ball has continued his dancing career, having performed as a dancer on Kylie Minogue's Showgirl: The Greatest Hits Tour and Showgirl: The Homecoming Tour.
- He also choreographed most of the Pop!'s music videos as well as several television adverts and X Factor performances.
- In 2005 Glenn was part of a dance act for Crazy Frog's Axel F on Top of The Pops.
- In 2006 Glenn was a dancer in the Eurovision Song Contest, performing with Turkey's Sibel Tuzun, with her song "Superstar".

Hannah Lewis

- Hannah Lewis (born 28 September 1985 (age 39))
- Lewis, who appeared on Never Mind the Buzzcocks shortly before the group's split, moved into glamour modelling following the group's demise, and has appeared in photoshoots for numerous magazines and newspapers.

Jade McGuire

- Jade McGuire (born 12 March 1986 (age 39))
- McGuire had her first child in July 2006 named Mia.
- Auditioned on The X Factor, airing in September 2015.

Jamie Tinkler

- Jamie Tinkler (born 28 January 1981 (age 44))
- In 2002 Jamie participated in A Song For Europe with his group Level Best with their song "Every Step of The Way".
- Tinkler went on to join Avenue for the purpose of participation in The X Factor''.

== Singles discography ==
=== Singles ===
Date	Single	Peak positions UK	Weeks in chart
May 2004	"Heaven and Earth"	14	2
August 2004	"Can't Say Goodbye"	26	3
January 2005	"Serious"	16	3
