= Avenue (group) =

English boy band

- Origin: London, England
- Genres: Pop
- Years active: 2006–2009
- Label: Island (2006–08)
- Spinoffs: The Wanted; Lawson
- Past members: Jamie Tinkler; Jonny Lloyd; Scott Clarke; Andy Brown; Max George; Ross Candy

Avenue were an English boy band. They participated in the third series of The X Factor in 2006 and initially made it to the top 12, but were banned from participation for having been specifically formed for the competition and having professional representation. They continued to proclaim their innocence.

After leaving The X Factor, they stayed together and had brief success with the single "Last Goodbye", which reached the UK top 50 and topped the Scottish Singles Chart. After the split, Max George went on to become a member of the British-Irish boyband The Wanted, releasing a number of top 5 hits, two official UK number ones, and three top 10 albums. Jamie Tinkler left to form the indie band Baxter, and his replacement in Avenue, Andy Brown, went on to be the lead singer of Lawson, who have released five top 10 singles.

== History ==
=== 2005–06: Beginnings ===
Max George was born in 1988 grew up with his family in Manchester Before music, he had been a football player with Preston North End and on the verge of signing a two-year deal with them. But because of an accident he had dropped his sport dreams to join Avenue and apply for auditions in The X Factor. After the break-up of the band, he joined the successful chart topping boy band The Wanted. George was engaged to actress Michelle Keegan, but called off the engagement. Despite the calling off of their engagement, the couple remained together for some time. However, they split up due to rumours spreading about Max cheating.

=== 2006–07: The X Factor ===
In 2006, Avenue auditioned for the third series of The X Factor, singing an a cappella version of "Leave Right Now", a song by Will Young. They made it through to bootcamp and judges' houses, and were mentored by Louis Walsh. Avenue made it to the top 12 contestants heading for the live shows but after Walsh discovered that Avenue were already on a management deal, he disqualified them from the competition and Eton Road went through in their place.

=== 2007–09: After The X Factor ===
After disqualification from The X Factor, Avenue were signed by Crown Music Management and won an album deal with Island Records. There was also a membership change with Jamie Tinkler leaving and being replaced by Andy Brown, after Tinkler decided to join the indie rock band Baxter.

Avenue released their debut single "Last Goodbye", which reached number 50 on the UK Singles Chart and number one on the Scottish Singles Chart. The song features on the compilation albums Floorfillers Clubmix, Dance Mania Party and Pop Party 6. During 2008, Avenue supported fellow McFly on their Radio:active Tour and a February 2009 tour was planned, but later cancelled.

Their follow-up single was going to be "Can You Feel It?", but a commercial release was cancelled and it was distributed free on music service 7digital. In 2008, while still a member of Avenue, Max George appeared nude on cover of British magazine AXM in support of cancer research in AXM's "Naked Issue".

The band split up in April 2009. Max George is now in The Wanted and Andy Brown fronts his own band, Lawson.

== Discography ==
=== Singles ===
- "Last Goodbye" No. 50 UK
- "Can You Feel It" (free single)
