= The Entertainment Mix =

- Title card (2024–present)
- Genre: Entertainment talk show
- Presented by: Michelle McManus
- Starring: Alice Cruikshank; Grant Stott
- Country of origin: Scotland
- Original languages: English, Scots
- No. of seasons: 2
- No. of episodes: 22

Production
- Running time: 30 mins
- Production company: BBC

Original release
- Network: BBC Scotland
- Release: 24 October 2024 – present

The Entertainment Mix is a Scottish entertainment chat show hosted by Michelle McManus which is broadcast in Scotland on the BBC Scotland television channel. The programme began airing on 24 October 2024, and features celebrity interviews in the fields of music, film, television, as well as featuring news and events relating to culture and arts across Scotland.

== Background ==
In September 2024, McManus was confirmed as the host for a new BBC Scotland series which would focus primarily on entertainment, culture and the arts sector across Scotland entitled The Entertainment Mix. The Commissioning Editor for BBC Scotland, Heather Kane-Darling, stated that the BBC "are thrilled to have Michelle present our weekly offering of The Entertainment Mix which will celebrate Scotland's talented performers and creators and provide audiences with everything they need to know about the big cultural moments across Scotland".

The show was commissioned by BBC Scotland as part of a "scheduling shake–up" at the channel, claiming that McManus would "treat audiences to a combination of feel-good music and celebrity interviews as well as bringing them all the best cultural events from right across the country".

== Format ==
As of January 2025, The Entertainment Mix airs on Thursday each week at 8PM, with each episode lasting half an hour. As well as featuring celebrity interviews, the show also features inputs relating to gigs, performances, and live events across Scotland which is part of a regular 'what's on' segment featured in the show. Additionally, the show includes highlights of previously broadcast interviews from music and cultural outputs on BBC Radio Scotland.

== Personnel ==
=== Presenter ===
- Michelle McManus (October 2024–present)

=== Roaming presenters ===
- Alice Cruikshank (October 2024–present)
- Grant Stott (October 2024–present)

== Episodes ==
=== Season 1 (2024) ===
| No. | Original release date | Guest(s) | Musical/entertainment guest(s) |
|---|---|---|---|
| 1 | 24 October 2024 | Paul Black, Robert Lindsay, Gayle Telfer Stevens and Louise McCarthy | Becky Sikasa |
The first broadcast of the show featured a segment focusing on nominees for the Scottish Album of the Year Award. Becky Sikasa was the featured artist, who appeared on the show performing her song "Wait Up".
| 2 | 31 October 2024 | Gary Lamont, Jason Donovan, Jayde Adams | Kitti |
Jazz musician, Kitti, performed her song "Maybe" live in the studio for the second episode of the show.
| 3 | 7 November 2024 | Karen Dunbar, Rhod Gilbert, Rag'n'Bone Man, Jodi Picoult | Calum Bowie |
Alice Cruikshank joined the 20th anniversary celebrations of theatre institution A Play, A Pie and a Pint. Additionally, the third series explored the archives from singer-songwriter Calum Bowie, who was awarded Breakthrough Act of the Year at the Scottish Music Awards in 2024.
| 4 | 14 November 2024 | Rick Astley, Kate Pierson, Sanjeev Kohli, Shereen Cutkelvin | Nathan Evans |
Nathan Evans performed his latest single release, "Paper Planes", and prior to the BAFTA Scotland awards, Alice Cruickshank interviewed ceremony host Sanjeev Kohli.
| 5 | 21 November 2024 | Gregor Fisher, Greg McHugh, Larry Dean, Joan Armatrading, Ashley Storrie, Hazel Irvine and Safia Oakley-Green | Ben Shankland |
Alice Cruikshank interviews winners from the 2024 Scottish BAFTA Awards, Ashley Storrie, Hazel Irvine and Safia Oakley-Green backstage at the Scottish BAFTAs. The BBC Radio Scotland Young Jazz Musician of the Year award winner in 2023, Ben Shankland, performs his version of "Make You Feel My Love" by Bob Dylan.
| 6 | 28 November 2024 | Sam Heughan, Katherine Ryan, Torvill and Dean, Christopher Macarthur-Boyd | N/A |
Promoters Sigi Whittle and Jemima Fasakin share the story of Scotland's most remote nightclub series, baile/baile, in Ullapool. Series host, Michelle McManus, explores various gigs and events occurring across the country at the time of the broadcast.
| 7 | 5 December 2024 | Jason Byrne, Katie Gregson-MacLeod, Peter Duncan, Jim Kerr | The Snuts |
Grant Stott gives behind the scenes access to the 2024 Cinderella performance at The Festival Theatre in Edinburgh. The Snuts perform their song "Gloria" which features footage originally broadcast from TRNSMT in July 2024.
| 8 | 12 December 2024 | Midge Ure, Jane McCarry, Mark Cox, The Rig cast, Alison O'Donnell, Lewis Howden | Michelle McManus |
McManus performed a version of "Christmas (Baby Please Come Home)" with her house band.
| 9 | 9 February 2025 | TBA | TBA |
| 10 | 16 February 2025 | Julianne Nicholson, James Marsden, The Chief cast Jack Docherty and Carmen Pieraccini, Patti Boulaye and Kyle Falconer | Kyle Falconer |
| 11 | 23 February 2025 | KT Tunstall, James Arthur, Gladiator Sabre, Zoe Lyons and Becky Sikasa. | TBA |
| 12 | 27 February 2025 | Gary Kemp, Mhairi Black, Nina Conti, Craig Hill, Sanjeev Mann | Bottle Rockets |
| 13 | 6 March 2025 | Matt Goss, Tim Roth, Takehiro Hira, Kōki, John Maclean, Callum Beattie, Jojo Moyes, Chris Brookmyre, Trisha Sakhlecha | Fourth Daughter |
| 14 | 13 March 2025 | Nick Mohammed, James McArdle, Nathan Carter, Tanner Adell, May and Robert Miller, | Michelle McManus and The Flaming Blackhearts |
McManus and her band, The Flaming Blackhearts, perform a Patsy Cline song at the end of the show
| 15 | 20 March 2025 | Grado, Judith Ralston, Julianne Nicolson, Eilidh Fisher, Russell Kane, Kym Blythe, Peter Mackay | Dead Pony |
| 16 | 27 March 2025 | Mark Bonnar, Matt Forde, Rebecca Vasmant, Tom Grennan, Susie McCabe | Lauren Mayberry |

=== Season 2 (2025) ===
| No. | Original release date | Guest(s) | Musical/entertainment guest(s) |
|---|---|---|---|
| 1 | 26 October 2025 | Nathan Evans, Dan Smith (Bastille), Siobhan McSweeney and Eric McCormack, Rianne Downey, and Nathan Sykes | Nathan Evans |
| 2 | 2 November 2025 | Adam Hills, Suzanne Vega, Stuart Mitchell and Wendy James | Butler, Blake & Grant |
| 3 | 9 November 2025 | Amy Macdonald, Karen Dunbar, Laurie Kynaston and Alex Lawther | Brooke Combe |
| 4 | 16 November 2025 | KT Tunstall, Alison O’Donnell, Steven Robertson and UB40 | Roan Anderson |
Judith Ralston and Phil Goodlad participate in a Children in Need challenge
| 5 | 23 November 2025 | Elle Vosque, Calum Bowie and Ella Eyre | Ben Walker |
| 6 | 30 November 2025 | Vicky McClure and Jonny Owen | Brògeal |
