= Michelle McManus' Winter Wonderland =

Studio album by Michelle McManus
- Released: 1 December 2019
- Genre: Christmas, pop
- Length: 33:04
- Label: McMannii

Michelle McManus chronology
| The Meaning of Love (2004) | Michelle McManus' Winter Wonderland (2019) |

Michelle McManus' Winter Wonderland is the second studio album, and first Christmas album, by Scottish singer Michelle McManus, featuring the SoundSational Community Choir. The album was released on 1 December 2019 via McManus' own independent record label, McMannii.

== Background ==
Prior to the recording and release of the album, McManus had been performing the annual Michelle McManus' Winter Wonderland show since 2016, and featuring the SoundSational Community Choir, a 50 piece choir. The show featured a mix of comedy, as well as McManus performing various Christmas songs from other artists. The live Winter Wonderland shows were written by McManus, in collaboration with comedian Bruce Devlin, and musical directors Tommy Chambers and Jen Phee.

SoundSational Community Choir, from Glasgow, was established in 2010, and have also collaborated with Scottish recording artist Amy Macdonald. Prior to the COVID-19 pandemic in Scotland, the choir raised £500,000 for various charities, and in 2023, MSP Monica Lennon wished the choir well and offered her congratulations to the group on the release of their album, Evolution, in a parliamentary motion in the Scottish Parliament.

On 1 December 2019, McManus released the album via her own independent record label, McMannii, which she originally established in 2007 after being dropped by her previous record company, Sony BMG, following the poor sales of her debut album The Meaning of Love (2004). The record label was founded in order for McManus to self–release her second studio album, Dancing to a Different Beat, which was scheduled for released in 2008 but eventually shelved.

== Track listing ==
Michelle McManus' Winter Wonderland track listing
| No. | Title | Writer(s) | Length |
|---|---|---|---|
| 1. | "Carol of the Bells" | Mykola Leontovych; Peter Wilhousky | 2:49 |
| 2. | "Winter Wonderland" | Felix Bernard; Richard Bernhard Smith | 2:27 |
| 3. | "Do You Hear What I Hear?" | Gloria Shayne; Noël Regney | 4:11 |
| 4. | "Silent Night" | Franz Xaver Gruber; Joseph Mohr | 3:01 |
| 5. | "Sleigh Ride" | Leroy Anderson; Mitchell Parish | 2:55 |
| 6. | "River" | Joni Mitchell | 4:18 |
| 7. | "God Rest Ye Merry, Gentlemen" | William Hone | 1:43 |
| 8. | "Santa Claus Is Comin' to Town" | J. Fred Coots; Haven Gillespie | 2:28 |
| 9. | "O Holy Night" | Adolphe Adam | 5:20 |
| 10. | "White Christmas" | Irving Berlin | 3:36 |
