= Pop Idol series 2 =

Pop Idol
- Series 2
- Hosted by: Ant & Dec (ITV); Kate Thornton (ITV2)
- Judges: Simon Cowell; Neil Fox; Nicki Chapman; Pete Waterman
- Winner: Michelle McManus
- Runner-up: Mark Rhodes

Release
- Original network: ITV; ITV2 (Pop Idol Extra)
- Original release: 13 September – 20 December 2003

Series chronology
- ← Previous; Series 1

The second and final series of the British reality television show Pop Idol aired on ITV on from 13 September to 20 December 2003. Michelle McManus was announced as the winner and received a £1 million recording contract to release her debut album. Ant & Dec returned to present the show on ITV, whilst Simon Cowell, Neil Fox, Nicki Chapman and Pete Waterman all returned as judges.

The second series was not as successful as the first series, and the viewing figures for the finale were much lower. Waterman considered McManus an unworthy winner. In 2004, Pop Idol was axed and ITV announced a new show created by Cowell, with no involvement from Pop Idol creator Simon Fuller—The X Factor. The perceived similarity between the two shows later became the subject of a legal dispute.

Judges and Presenter(s) for Pop Idol Series 2

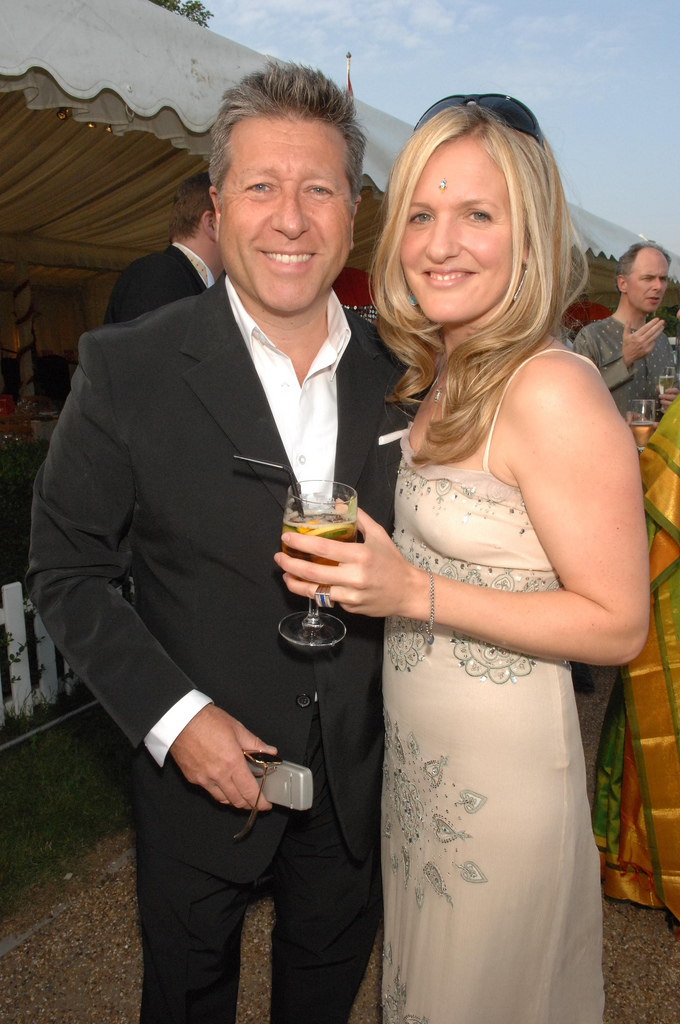
Neil Fox (left)

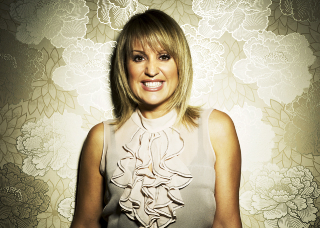
Nicki Chapman

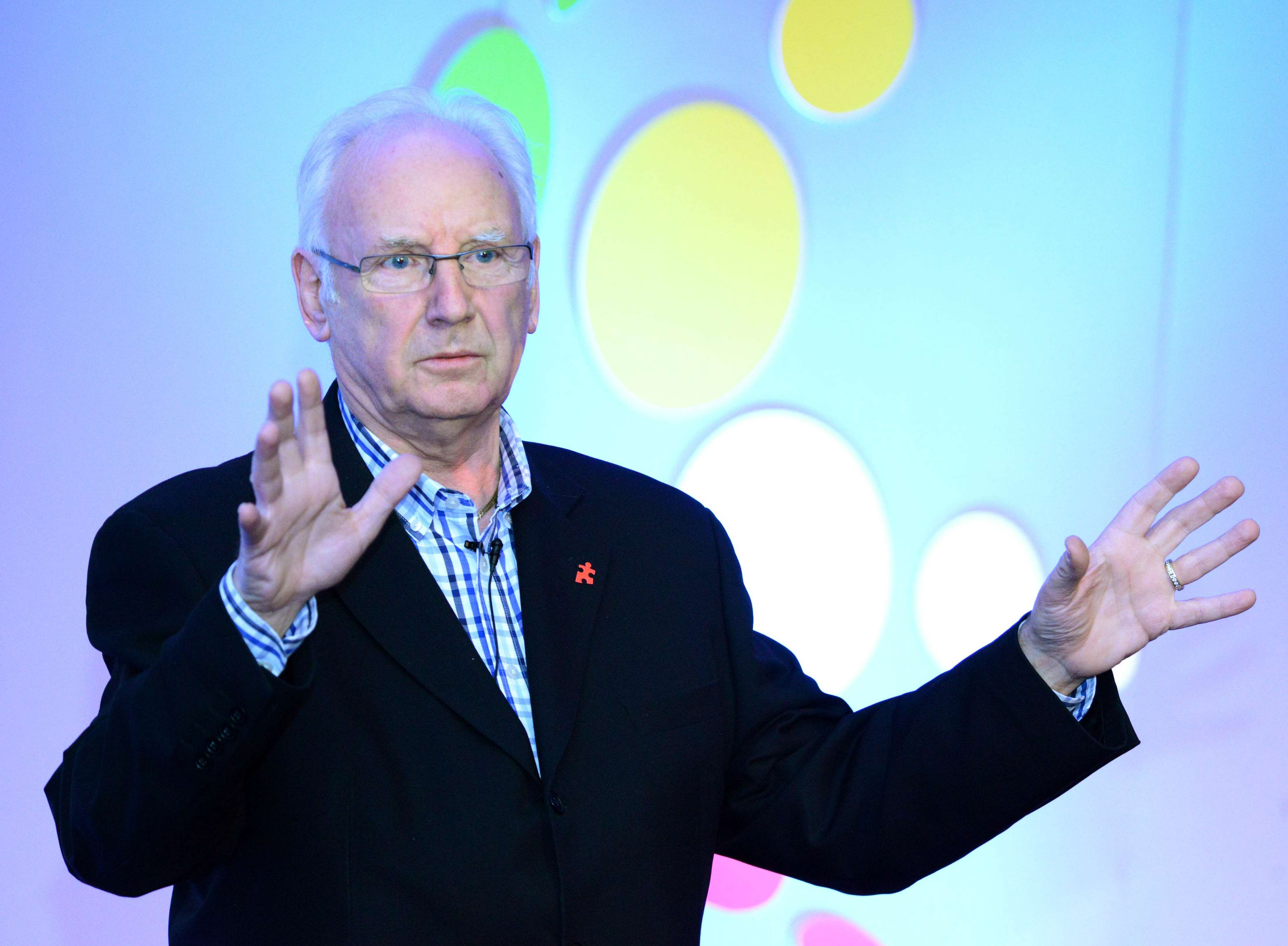
Pete Waterman

Simon Cowell

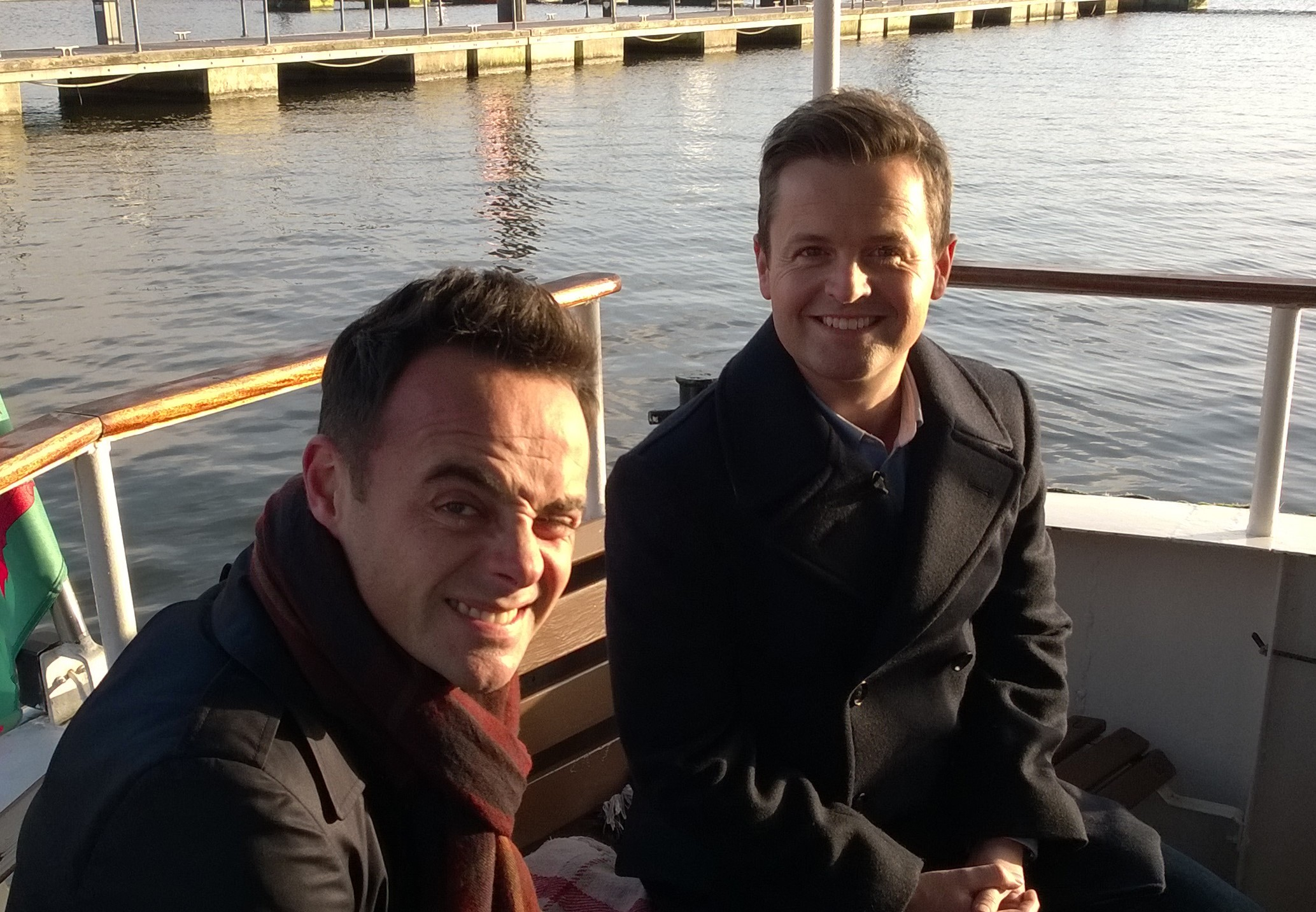
Ant & Dec (ITV1)

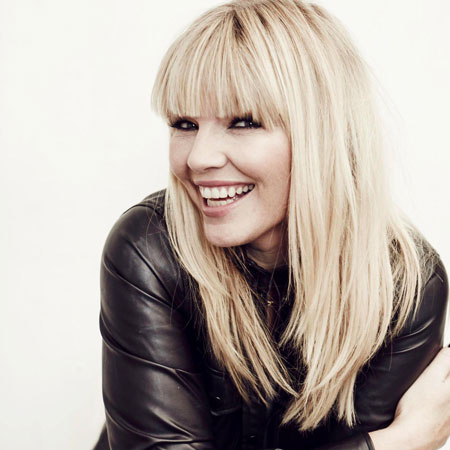
Kate Thornton (ITV2)

== Live shows ==
The live shows began on 25 October, and continued through to the live final on 20 December.

== Finalists ==
Finalist	Age	Hometown	Status
Leon McPherson	20	Stoke Newington	Eliminated 1st on 25 October
Kirsty Crawford	19	Northampton	Eliminated 2nd on 25 October
Andy Wood	20	Leeds	Eliminated 3rd on 1 November
Brian Ormond	24	Dublin	Eliminated 4th on 1 November
Kim Gee	23	Grimsby	Eliminated 5th on 8 November
Andy Scott-Lee	23	Rhyl	Eliminated 6th on 15 November
Roxanne Cooper	16	Hull	Eliminated 7th on 22 November
Susanne Manning	21	Reading	Eliminated 8th on 29 November
Chris Hide	18	Lancing	Eliminated 9th on 6 December
Sam Nixon	17	Barnsley	Third place on 13 December
Mark Rhodes	22	West Midlands	Runner-up on 20 December
Michelle McManus	23	Glasgow	Winner on 20 December

* as of the start of the series

== Heats and live shows ==
=== Results summary ===
Colour key

–	Contestant was in the bottom two
–	Contestant was in the bottom three
–	Contestant received the fewest public votes and was eliminated
–	Contestant received the most public votes (weeks 1-8)
–	Contestant won the competition
–	Contestant who the judges selected as a wild card

Stage:		Heats					Wild card	Live shows								
Week:		13 Sep	20 Sep	27 Sep	4 Oct	11 Oct	18 Oct	25 Oct	1 Nov	8 Nov	15 Nov	22 Nov	29 Nov	6 Dec	13 Dec	20 Dec
Place	Contestant	13 Sep	20 Sep	27 Sep	4 Oct	11 Oct	18 Oct	25 Oct	1 Nov	8 Nov	15 Nov	22 Nov	29 Nov	6 Dec	13 Dec	20 Dec
1	Michelle McManus	1st 31.4%						5th 9.9%	1st 17.2%	6th 10.7%	1st 23.3%	1st 24.3%	2nd 29.0%	1st 40.0%	1st 40.3%	Winner; 58.2%
2	Mark Rhodes					2nd 20.3%		10th 4.9%	7th 7.1%	2nd 15.5%	5th 10.9%	5th 13.7%	3rd 15.1%	3rd 19.0%	2nd 33.6%	Runner-up; 41.8%
3	Sam Nixon			3rd 19.4%			J/C	2nd 12.4%	5th 11.1%	5th 11.5%	2nd 16.8%	2nd 18.0%	1st 34.2%	2nd 23.4%	3rd 26.0%	Eliminated (week 8)
4	Chris Hide	2nd 19.3%						3rd 11.0%	6th 8.1%	3rd 13.5%	6th 10.9%	3rd 16.9%	4th 12.2%	4th 17.5%	Eliminated (week 7)	
5	Susanne Manning		3rd 16.1%				1st 27.2%	1st 16.8%	4th 13.4%	1st 22.3%	4th 11.9%%	4th 13.8%	5th 9.7%	Eliminated (week 6)		
6	Roxanne Cooper			2nd 23.5%				8th 5.2%	3rd 13.4%	7th 9.6%	3rd 16.5%	6th 13.2%	Eliminated (week 5)			
7	Andy Scott-Lee					1st 21.1%		7th 7.1%	2nd 16.0%	4th 12.3%	7th 9.8%	Eliminated (week 4)				
8	Kim Gee				2nd 24.2%			6th 8.2%	8th 5.7%	8th 4.6%	Eliminated (week 3)					
9	Brian Ormond		2nd 16.8%					9th 5.2%	9th 5.0%	Eliminated (week 2)						
10	Andy Wood			1st 28.2%				4th 11.0%	10th 4.2%	Eliminated (week 2)						
11	Kirsty Crawford		1st 19.9%					11th 4.2%	Eliminated (week 1)							
12	Leon McPherson				1st 28.6%			12th 4.0%	Eliminated (week 1)							
Wild; Card	Danielle Tedford					3rd 17.5%	2nd 16.2%	Eliminated (Wildcard round)								
Wild; Card	Jason Brook	3rd 17.4%					3rd 10.4%	Eliminated (Wildcard round)								
Wild; Card	Jodie Connor		4th 15.2%				Eliminated	Eliminated (Wildcard round)								
Wild; Card	Rebecca Hayes	4th 9.8%					Eliminated	Eliminated (Wildcard round)								
Wild; Card	Kieran McDonald			4th 10.7%			Eliminated	Eliminated (Wildcard round)								
Wild; Card	Glen Harvey					4th 15.1%	Eliminated	Eliminated (Wildcard round)								
Heat 5	Tina Perry					5th 6.9%	Eliminated (Heat 5)									
Heat 5	Craig Chalmers					Eliminated	Eliminated (Heat 5)									
Heat 5	Becky Oakley					Eliminated	Eliminated (Heat 5)									
Heat 5	Elizabeth Anastasiou					Eliminated	Eliminated (Heat 5)									
Heat 5	Katy Pullinger					Eliminated	Eliminated (Heat 5)									
Heat 5	Tamsin Vaughn					Eliminated	Eliminated (Heat 5)									
Heat 4	Becca Hossanney				3rd 15.5%	Eliminated (Heat 4)										
Heat 4	Jamie Tinkler				4th 8.7%	Eliminated (Heat 4)										
Heat 4	Tarek Jabre				5th 8.4%	Eliminated (Heat 4)										
Heat 4	Sarah Nowak				Eliminated	Eliminated (Heat 4)										
Heat 4	Elizabeth Rogers				Eliminated	Eliminated (Heat 4)										
Heat 4	Laura Ross				Eliminated	Eliminated (Heat 4)										
Heat 4	David Archer				Eliminated	Eliminated (Heat 4)										
Heat 4	Danielle Wooley				Eliminated	Eliminated (Heat 4)										
Heat 3	Suzanne Carley			5th 7.7%	Eliminated (Heat 3)											
Heat 3	Hayley Bamford			Eliminated	Eliminated (Heat 3)											
Heat 3	Kate Ainscough			Eliminated	Eliminated (Heat 3)											
Heat 3	Rachel Ifon			Eliminated	Eliminated (Heat 3)											
Heat 3	Amy Kellegher			Eliminated	Eliminated (Heat 3)											
Heat 3	Michael Morrison			Eliminated	Eliminated (Heat 3)											
Heat 2	Adam Garner		5th 9.4%	Eliminated (Heat 2)												
Heat 2	Samantha Jones		Eliminated	Eliminated (Heat 2)												
Heat 2	Bianca Lindgreen		Eliminated	Eliminated (Heat 2)												
Heat 2	Maxwell Roche		Eliminated	Eliminated (Heat 2)												
Heat 2	Kelly-Marie Smith		Eliminated	Eliminated (Heat 2)												
Heat 2	Wesu Wallace		Eliminated	Eliminated (Heat 2)												
Heat 1	Eddie Parry	5th 9.4%	Eliminated (Heat 1)													
Heat 1	Jade Hewitt	Eliminated	Eliminated (Heat 1)													
Heat 1	Tim Mvula	Eliminated	Eliminated (Heat 1)													
Heat 1	Helen O'Brien	Eliminated	Eliminated (Heat 1)													
Heat 1	Emma Dane	Eliminated	Eliminated (Heat 1)													
Heat 1	Darja Schabad	Eliminated	Eliminated (Heat 1)													

- In week 1 of the finals, Chris and Andy received the same vote percentage as did Roxanne and Brian. In week 2, Mark and Chris received the same vote percentage.

=== Live show details ===
==== Heat 1 (13 September- Recorded on 10 September 2003) ====
Contestants' performances on the first live heat
Act	Order	From	Song	Result
Emma Dane	1	Preston	"Hero" (Mariah Carey)	Eliminated
Jade Hewitt	2	Sheffield	"I Wanna Dance With Somebody" (Whitney Houston)	Eliminated
Eddie Parry	3	Staffordshire	"Still" (Lionel Richie)	Eliminated – (5th place)
Helen O'Brien	4	Kessingland	"Promise Me" (Beverley Craven)	Eliminated
Tim Mvula	5	Chester	"Just the Way You Are" (Billy Joel)	Eliminated
Michelle McManus	6	Glasgow	"Don't Be a Stranger" (Dina Carroll)	Advanced – (1st place)
Darja Schabad	7	Riga	"Underneath Your Clothes" (Shakira)	Eliminated
Chris Hide	8	Lancing	"End of the Road" (Boyz II Men)	Advanced – (2nd place)
Jason Brock	9	Woburn	"(Everything I Do) I Do It for You" (Bryan Adams)	Eliminated – (3rd place)
Rebecca Hayes	10	London	"Stop!" (Sam Brown)	Eliminated – (4th place)

Notes;

- The hosts revealed the contestants who received the top five numbers of votes in reverse order. Michelle McManus and Chris Hide advanced to the top 12 of the competition. The other eight contestants were eliminated.
- Jason Brock and Rebecca Hayes returned for a second chance at the top 12 in the Wildcard Round.

==== Heat 2 (20 September-Recorded on 17 September 2003) ====
Contestants' performances on the second live heat
Act	Order	From	Song	Result
Samantha Jones	1	Tamworth	"The Power of Love" (Jennifer Rush)	Eliminated
Maxwell Roche	2	Staines	"Your Song" (Elton John)	Eliminated
Bianca Lindgreen	3	London	"Think Twice" (Celine Dion)	Eliminated
Wesu Wallace	4	Brighton	"Overjoyed" (Stevie Wonder)	Eliminated
Kelly-Marie Smith	5	South London	"Endless Love" (Diana Ross)	Eliminated
Susanne Manning	6	Reading	"Piece of My Heart" (Erma Franklin)	Eliminated – (3rd place)
Brian Ormond	7	Dublin	"Amazed" (Lonestar)	Advanced – (2nd place)
Kirsty Crawford	8	Northampton	"(You Make Me Feel Like) A Natural Woman" (Aretha Franklin)	Advanced – (1st place)
Adam Garner	9	Buckinghamshire	"Knocks Me Off My Feet" (Stevie Wonder)	Eliminated – (5th place)
Jodie Connor	10	Oldham	"One Day I'll Fly Away" (Randy Crawford)	Eliminated – (4th place)

Notes

- The hosts revealed the contestants who received the top five numbers of votes in reverse order. Kirsty Crawford and Brian Ormond advanced to the top 12 of the competition. The other 8 contestants were eliminated.
- Jodie Connor and Susanne Manning returned for a second chance at the top 12 in the Wildcard Round.

==== Heat 3 (27 September- Recorded on 24 September 2003) ====
Contestants' performances on the third live heat
Act	Order	From	Song	Result
Kate Ainscough	1	Windermere	"Show Me Heaven" (Maria McKee)	Eliminated
Amy Kellegher	2	Romford	"Get Here" (Oleta Adams)	Eliminated
Kieran McDonald	3	Musselburgh	"Goodnight Girl" (Wet Wet Wet)	Eliminated – (4th place)
Michael Morrison	4	Bromley	"Always and Forever" (Heatwave)	Eliminated
Rachel Ifon	5	Birkenhead	"(Sittin' On) The Dock of the Bay" (Otis Redding)	Eliminated
Hayley Bamford	6	Yorkshire	"That's What Friends Are For" (Dionne Warwick)	Eliminated
Roxanne Cooper	7	Hull	"Beautiful" (Christina Aguilera)	Advanced – (2nd place)
Sam Nixon	8	Barnsley	"Walking in Memphis" (Marc Cohn)	Eliminated – (3rd place)
Suzanne Carley	9	Watford	"Run to You" (Whitney Houston)	Eliminated – (5th place)
Andy Wood	10	Leeds	"Easy" (Commodores)	Advanced – (1st place)

Notes

- The hosts revealed the contestants who received the top five numbers of votes in reverse order. Andy Wood and Roxanne Cooper advanced to the top 12 of the competition. The other 8 contestants were eliminated.
- Kieran McDonald and Sam Nixon returned for a second chance at the top 12 in the Wildcard Round.

==== Heat 4 (4 October- Recorded on 1 October 2003) ====
Contestants' performances on the fourth live heat
Act	Order	From	Song	Result
Elizabeth Rogers	1	Liverpool	"You're Still the One" (Shania Twain)	Eliminated
Sarah Nowak	2	Maidenhead	"Stuck in the Middle With You" (Stealers Wheel)	Eliminated
Jamie Tinkler	3	Middlesbrough	"Right Here Waiting" (Richard Marx)	Eliminated – (4th place)
Kim Gee	4	Grimsby	"Son of a Preacher Man" (Dusty Springfield)	Advanced – (2nd place)
Laura Russ	5	Wirral	"Killing Me Softly with His Song" (Roberta Flack)	Eliminated
David Archer	6	South Wales	"What Makes a Man" (Westlife)	Eliminated
Danielle Wooley	7	Nottingham	"When I Fall in Love" (Doris Day)	Eliminated
Leon McPherson	8	Stoke Newington	"You Are Not Alone" (Michael Jackson)	Advanced – (1st place)
Becca Hossanney	9	Hailsham	"Without You" (Badfinger)	Eliminated – (3rd place)
Tarek Jabre	10	East London	"Let Me Entertain You" (Robbie Williams)	Eliminated – (5th place)

Notes

- The hosts revealed the contestants who received the top five numbers of votes in reverse order. Leon McPherson and Kim Gee advanced to the top 12 of the competition. The other 8 contestants were eliminated.
- None of the contestants from this round made it into the Wildcard Round, making it the only group to not be represented at that stage.

==== Heat 5 (11 October- Recorded on 8 October 2003) ====
Contestants' performances on the fifth live heat
Act	Order	From	Song	Result
Tamsin Vaughn	1	London	"Holding Out for a Hero" (Bonnie Tyler)	Eliminated
Mark Rhodes	2	West Midlands	"She's Like the Wind" (Patrick Swayze)	Advanced – (2nd place)
Katy Pullinger	3	Weybridge	"Desperado" (Eagles)	Eliminated
Becky Oakley	4	Tonypandy	"You Might Need Somebody" (Shola Ama)	Eliminated
Tina Perry	5	Kent	"I Don't Want to Miss a Thing" (Aerosmith)	Eliminated – (5th place)
Craig Chalmers	6	Edinburgh	"I Believe I Can Fly" (R.Kelly)	Eliminated
Danielle Tedford	7	Barrow-in-Furness	"Fields of Gold" (Sting)	Eliminated – (3rd place)
Andy Scott-Lee	8	Rhyl	"Careless Whisper" (Wham!)	Advanced – (1st place)
Glen Harvey	9	Hampshire	"A Million Love Songs" (Take That)	Eliminated – (4th place)
Elizabeth Anastasiou	10	London	"When I Need You" (Leo Sayer)	Eliminated

Notes

- The hosts revealed the contestants who received the top five numbers of votes in reverse order. Andy Scott-Lee and Mark Rhodes advanced to the top 12 of the competition. The other 8 contestants were eliminated.
- Glen Harvey and Danielle Tedford returned for a second chance at the top 12 in the Wildcard Round.
- Craig Chalmers later went on to make the live finals of Any Dream Will Do in 2007.

==== Wildcard round (18 October) ====
For the first time (and only time) on the UK version of Pop Idol, there was a Wildcard Round where previously eliminated contestants returned for a second chance at making it through to the live finals. As a result, the final 10 was to become a final twelve. The judges announced which eight contestants would earn a Wildcard place at the end of the 11 October results show, and that after they perform the public would choose one contestant to go through, and the judges would pick another. The eight contestants who contested the Wildcard Round were Jason Brock, Jodie Connor, Glen Harvey, Rebecca Hayes, Susanne Manning, Kieran McDonald, Sam Nixon and Danielle Tedford.

Contestants' performances on the live wildcard round
Act	Order	Song	Result
Kieran McDonald	1	"I'm Your Man" (Wham!)	Eliminated – (3rd place)
Jodie Connor	2	"Heaven" (Bryan Adams)	Eliminated
Rebecca Hayes	3	"I'll Be There" (Jackson 5)	Eliminated
Jason Brock	4	"Lately" (Stevie Wonder)	Eliminated
Glen Harvey	5	"Yesterday" (The Beatles)	Eliminated
Susanne Manning	6	"I Don't Want to Talk About It" (Everything But The Girl)	Advanced – (1st place)
Danielle Tedford	7	"Thorn in My Side" (Annie Lennox)	Eliminated – (2nd place)
Sam Nixon	8	"Over My Shoulder" (Mike + The Mechanics)	Advanced – (Judges choice)

Notes

- The judges selected Sam to move on into the Top 12 of the competition, before the hosts revealed the Top 3 vote getters. Susanne received the most votes, and completed the top 12. It was not made clear whether or not Sam was actually in the top 3, as the hosts stated that it was the top 3 of the remaining 7 contestants. Danielle missed out on the finals by one place for the second time.
- In 2010, Jodie Connor's vocals were featured on the UK number-one single "Good Times" by London grime collective, Roll Deep, and she later went onto launch a solo career.

==== Live show 1 (25 October) ====
- Theme: Songs by contestant's 'Pop Idol'
- Best bits songs: "You Are Not Alone" (Leon McPherson) & "Nobody Does It Better" (Kirsty Crawford)

Due to the addition of two extra contestants through the Wildcard Round, it was announced that for the first two weeks of the finals, two contestants would be eliminated instead of the standard one.

Contestants' performances on the first live show
Act	Order	Song	Musical Hero	Result
Kirsty Crawford	1	"I'm Outta Love" (Anastacia)	Anastacia	Eliminated
Leon McPherson	2	"I Just Called to Say I Love You" (Stevie Wonder)	Stevie Wonder	Eliminated
Brian Ormond	3	"A Different Corner" (George Michael)	George Michael	Safe
Kim Gee	4	"River Deep - Mountain High" (Tina Turner)	Tina Turner	Safe
Mark Rhodes	5	"With or Without You" (U2)	U2	Bottom three
Susanne Manning	6	"Ironic" (Alanis Morissette)	Alanis Morissette	Safe
Andy Scott-Lee	7	"If You're Not the One" (Daniel Bedingfield)	Daniel Bedingfield	Safe
Sam Nixon	8	"Handbags & Gladrags" (Rod Stewart)	Rod Stewart	Safe
Michelle McManus	9	"All By Myself" (Eric Carmen)	Celine Dion	Safe
Andy Wood	10	"To Love Somebody" (The Bee Gees)	The Bee Gees	Safe
Roxanne Cooper	11	"You're Still the One" (Shania Twain)	Shania Twain	Safe
Chris Hide	12	"Don't Let the Sun Go Down on Me" (Elton John)	Elton John	Safe

- Judges Prediction of who will leave
- Neil Fox: Leon McPherson and Mark Rhodes
- Nicki Chapman: Leon McPherson and Michelle McManus
- Pete Waterman: Leon McPherson and Kirsty Crawford
- Simon Cowell: Leon McPherson and Kirsty Crawford

Notes

- Just 80 votes separated Chris Hide and Andy Wood in week one.

==== Live show 2 (1 November) ====
- Theme: Songs from contestant's birth year
- Best bits songs: "Flying Without Wings" (Brian Ormond) & "Against All Odds (Take a Look at Me Now)" (Andy Wood)

Contestants' performances on the second live show
Act	Order	Song	Birth year	Result
Andy Wood	1	"I Believe I Can Fly" (R Kelly)	1983	Eliminated
Susanne Manning	2	"Only You" (Yazoo)	1982	Safe
Sam Nixon	3	"True Colours" (Cyndi Lauper)	1986	Safe
Kim Gee	4	"Hot Stuff" (Donna Summer)	1979	Bottom three
Chris Hide	5	"Heaven" (Bryan Adams)	1983	Safe
Mark Rhodes	6	"Imagine" (John Lennon)	1981	Safe
Roxanne Cooper	7	"Take My Breath Away" (Berlin)	1986	Safe
Andy Scott-Lee	8	"She's Out of My Life" (Michael Jackson)	1980	Safe
Brian Ormond	9	"Honesty" (Billy Joel)	1979	Eliminated
Michelle McManus	10	"On the Radio" (Donna Summer)	1979	Safe

- Judges Prediction of who will leave
- Neil Fox: Mark Rhodes & Brian Ormond
- Nicki Chapman: Andy Wood & Brian Ormond
- Pete Waterman: Brian Ormond & Kim Gee
- Simon Cowell: Mark Rhodes & Brian Ormond

==== Live show 3 (8 November) ====
- Theme: Elton John songs
- Best bits song: "(I've Had) The Time of My Life"

Contestants' performances on the third live show
Act	Order	Song	Result
Roxanne Cooper	1	"Sorry Seems to Be the Hardest Word"	Bottom two
Chris Hide	2	"Circle of Life"	Safe
Andy Scott Lee	3	"Can You Feel the Love Tonight"	Safe
Michelle McManus	4	"Your Song"	Bottom three
Sam Nixon	5	"I Want Love"	Safe
Kim Gee	6	"The One"	Eliminated
Mark Rhodes	7	"Something About the Way You Look Tonight"	Safe
Susanne Manning	8	"I Guess That's Why They Call It the Blues"	Safe

- Judges Prediction of who will leave
- Neil Fox: Chris Hide
- Nicki Chapman: Chris Hide
- Pete Waterman: Kim Gee
- Simon Cowell: Kim Gee

==== Live show 4 (15 November) ====
- Theme: Disco songs
- Best bits song: "Wind Beneath My Wings"

Contestants' performances on the fourth live show
Act	Order	Song	Result
Susanne Manning	1	"Young Hearts Run Free" (Candi Staton)	Safe
Andy Scott-Lee	2	"Rock with You" (Michael Jackson)	Eliminated
Michelle McManus	3	"If I Can't Have You" (Yvonne Elliman)	Safe
Mark Rhodes	4	"More Than a Woman" (The Bee Gees)	Bottom three
Sam Nixon	5	"Blame It on the Boogie" (Mick Jackson)	Safe
Roxanne Cooper	6	"Can You Feel It" (The Jacksons)	Safe
Chris Hide	7	"Ain't Nobody" (Chaka Khan)	Bottom two

- Judges Prediction of who will leave
- Neil Fox: Chris Hide
- Nicki Chapman: Chris Hide
- Pete Waterman: Roxanne Cooper
- Simon Cowell: Roxanne Cooper

Notes

- Just 697 votes separated Mark Rhodes and Chris Hide in week four.
- Although Hide was second from bottom, he was announced as safe, leading viewers to assume that Suzanne had come second from bottom.

==== Live show 5 (22 November) ====
- Theme: The Beatles songs
- Best bits song: "Didn't We Almost Have It All"

Contestants' performances on the fifth live show
Act	Order	Song	Result
Sam Nixon	1	"With a Little Help From My Friends"	Safe
Susanne Manning	2	"Ticket to Ride"	Bottom three
Chris Hide	3	"The Long and Winding Road"	Safe
Roxanne Cooper	4	"Let It Be"	Eliminated
Michelle McManus	5	"Hey Jude"	Safe
Mark Rhodes	6	"Help!"	Bottom two

- Judges Prediction of who will leave
- Neil Fox: Mark Rhodes
- Nicki Chapman: Mark Rhodes
- Pete Waterman: Mark Rhodes
- Simon Cowell: Mark Rhodes

==== Live show 6 (29 November) ====
- Theme: Big band
- Best bits song: "Beautiful"

Contestants' performances on the sixth live show
Act	Order	Song	Result
Michelle McManus	1	"Feeling Good" (Nina Simone)	Safe
Chris Hide	2	"Ain't That a Kick in the Head?" (Dean Martin)	Bottom two
Susanne Manning	3	"Cry Me a River" (Julie London)	Eliminated
Mark Rhodes	4	"Have You Met Miss Jones?" (Robbie Williams)	Safe
Sam Nixon	5	"Mr. Bojangles" (Sammy Davis Jr)	Safe

- Judges Prediction of who will leave
- Neil Fox: Susanne Manning
- Nicki Chapman: Susanne Manning
- Pete Waterman: Susanne Manning
- Simon Cowell: Susanne Manning (after accidentally saying Roxanne, already eliminated)

==== Live show 7 (6 December) ====
- Theme: Christmas songs
- Best bits song: "Don't Let the Sun Go Down on Me"

Contestants' performances on the seventh live show
Act	Order	Song	Order	Song	Result
Mark Rhodes	1	"Merry Xmas Everybody" (Slade)	5	"Blue Christmas" (Elvis Presley)	Bottom two
Sam Nixon	2	"I Wish It Could Be Christmas Everyday" (Wizzard)	6	"Santa Claus Is Coming to Town" (The Jackson 5)	Safe
Chris Hide	3	"Winter Wonderland" (Tony Bennett)	7	"White Christmas" (Bing Crosby)	Eliminated
Michelle McManus	4	"Merry Christmas Everyone" (Shakin' Stevens)	8	"Oh Holy Night" (Various artists)	Safe

- Judges Prediction of who will leave
- Neil Fox: Mark Rhodes
- Nicki Chapman: Mark Rhodes
- Pete Waterman: Mark Rhodes
- Simon Cowell: Mark Rhodes

==== Live show 8 (13 December) ====
- Theme: Judges' song choice
- Best bits song: "Hero"

Contestants' performances on the eighth live show
Act	Order	Song	Order	Song	Result
Sam Nixon	1	"Maggie May" (Rod Stewart)	4	"Always" (Bon Jovi)	Eliminated
Michelle McManus	2	"I Say a Little Prayer" (Dionne Warwick)	5	"Without You" (Badfinger)	Safe
Mark Rhodes	3	"Back for Good" (Take That)	6	"If You Don't Know Me By Now" (Simply Red)	Safe

- Judges Prediction of who will leave
- Neil Fox: Mark Rhodes
- Nicki Chapman: Mark Rhodes
- Pete Waterman: Michelle McManus
- Simon Cowell: Refused to vote

==== Final (20 December) ====
Contestants' performances on the ninth live show
Act	Order	Song	Order	Song	Order	Song	Result
Mark Rhodes	1	"All This Time"	3	"She's Like the Wind"	5	"Measure of a Man"	Runner-up
Michelle McManus	2	"All This Time"	4	"On the Radio"	6	"The Meaning of Love"	Winner

== Reception ==
=== Ratings ===
Episode	Date	Viewers (millions)	Weekly rank
Auditions 1	9 August	5.61	16
Auditions 2	16 August	7.33	10
Auditions 3	23 August	7.68	10
Auditions 4	30 August	8.85	10
Theatre rounds	6 September	7.29	18
Heat 1	13 September	6.57	18
Heat 1 results	13 September	Under 3.83	Outside Top 30
Heat 2	20 September	6.82	19
Heat 2 results	20 September	7.19	17
Heat 3	27 September	7.02	14
Heat 3 results	27 September	6.63	15
Heat 4	4 October	7.19	13
Heat 4 results	4 October	7.31	12
Heat 5	11 October	6.79	18
Heat 5 results	11 October	6.46	19
Wildcard round	18 October	8.15	12
Wildcard round results	18 October	7.65	15
Live show 1	25 October	8.33	13
Live show 1 results	25 October	7.84	16
Live show 2	1 November	8.53	15
Live show 2 results	1 November	8.02	16
Live show 3	8 November	8.82	13
Live show 3 results	8 November	8.36	14
Live show 4	15 November	8.45	14
Live show 4 results	15 November	7.56	19
Live show 5	22 November	9.44	11
Live show 5 results	22 November	8.99	13
Live show 6	29 November	9.98	8
Live show 6 results	29 November	9.27	10
Live show 7	6 December	9.86	8
Live show 7 results	6 December	9.32	11
Live show 8	6 December	10.51	7
Live show 8 results	13 December	9.37	12
Live final	20 December	11.04	6
Live final results	20 December	10.13	8
