= The X Factor (British TV series) series 3 =

British TV competition

The X Factor
- Series 3
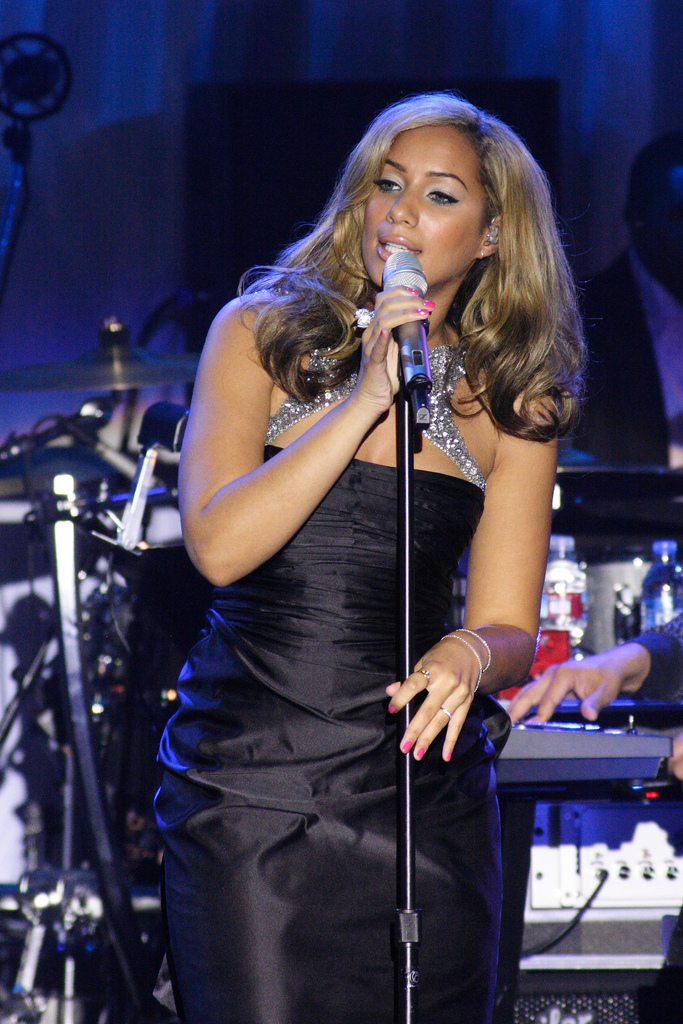
- Lewis performing in 2009
- Hosted by: Kate Thornton (ITV); Ben Shephard (ITV2)
- Judges: Simon Cowell; Sharon Osbourne; Louis Walsh; Paula Abdul (guest)
- Winner: Leona Lewis
- Winning mentor: Simon Cowell
- Runner-up: Ray Quinn

Release
- Original network: ITV; ITV2 (The Xtra Factor)
- Original release: 19 August – 16 December 2006

Series chronology
- ← Previous; Series 2 Next → Series 4

The X Factor is a British television music competition to find new singing talent. The third series was broadcast on ITV from 19 August 2006 until 16 December 2006. Louis Walsh, Sharon Osbourne and Simon Cowell all returned for their third series on the judging panel. Kate Thornton returned to present the main show on ITV, while Ben Shephard returned to present spin-off show The Xtra Factor on ITV2. After the semi-final on 9 December, Cowell became the winning judge even though the series had not yet finished, as two of his acts, Ray Quinn and Leona Lewis, became the final two. Lewis won the series on 16 December, with Quinn finishing as runner-up.

Instead of the earlier red and purple colour scheme, this year's theme was red and blue. A new-look website for the third series was launched on 11 August 2006. The final on 16 December brought in the show's then-highest ever audience, with 12.6 million people tuning in (a 56% audience share), and 8 million votes were cast, with Lewis receiving 60%. Lewis released a cover of Kelly Clarkson's "A Moment Like This" as her winner's single, and it went on to become the Christmas number one on 24 December despite only going on sale four days before on 20 December. It ended as the United Kingdom's second best selling single of the year. In January 2007, the single was awarded platinum status by the British Phonographic Industry. According to the Official Charts Company, the song has sold 895,000 copies in the United Kingdom as of December 2012.

Lewis emerged as the most successful contestant to appear on the X Factor having sold over 30 million records worldwide as well as being the only former contestant to be nominated for a Grammy.

This was the last series presented by Kate Thornton and the last time Ben Shephard presented The Xtra Factor. It was also the last series with only three judges (excluding times when a judge was absent).

== Judges and Presenters ==
Judges and Presenter(s) for The X Factor Series 3

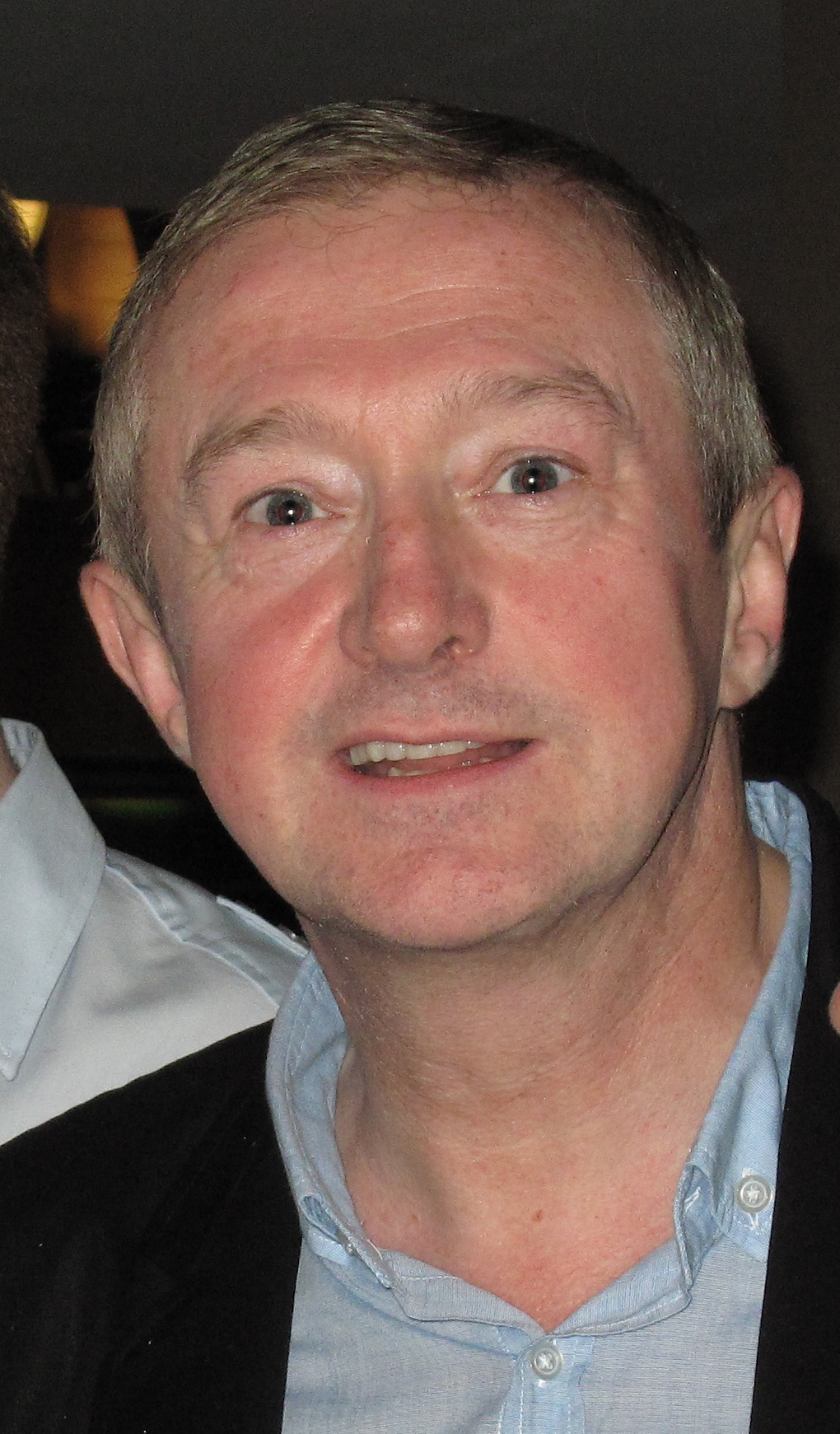
Louis Walsh

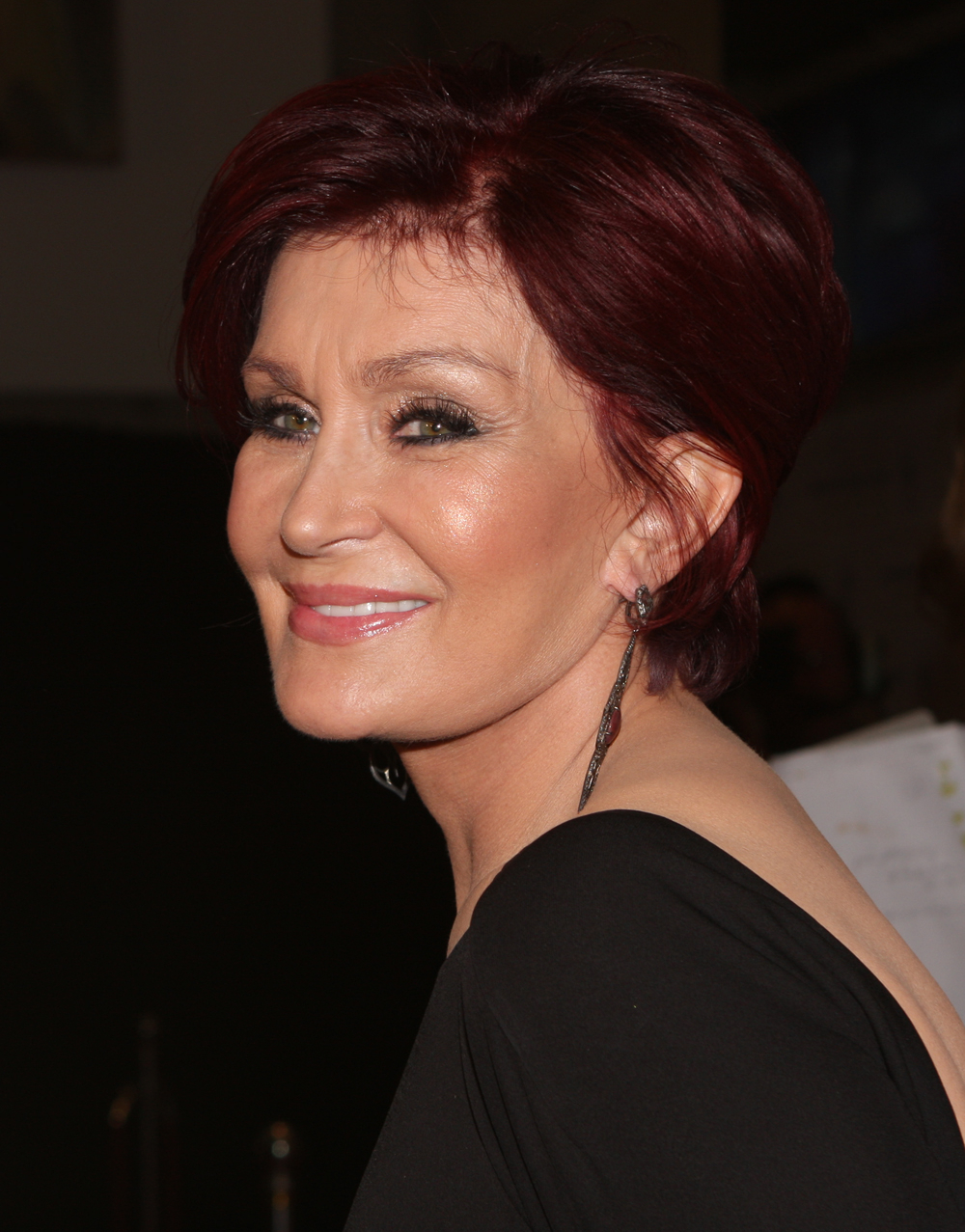
Sharon Osbourne

Simon Cowell

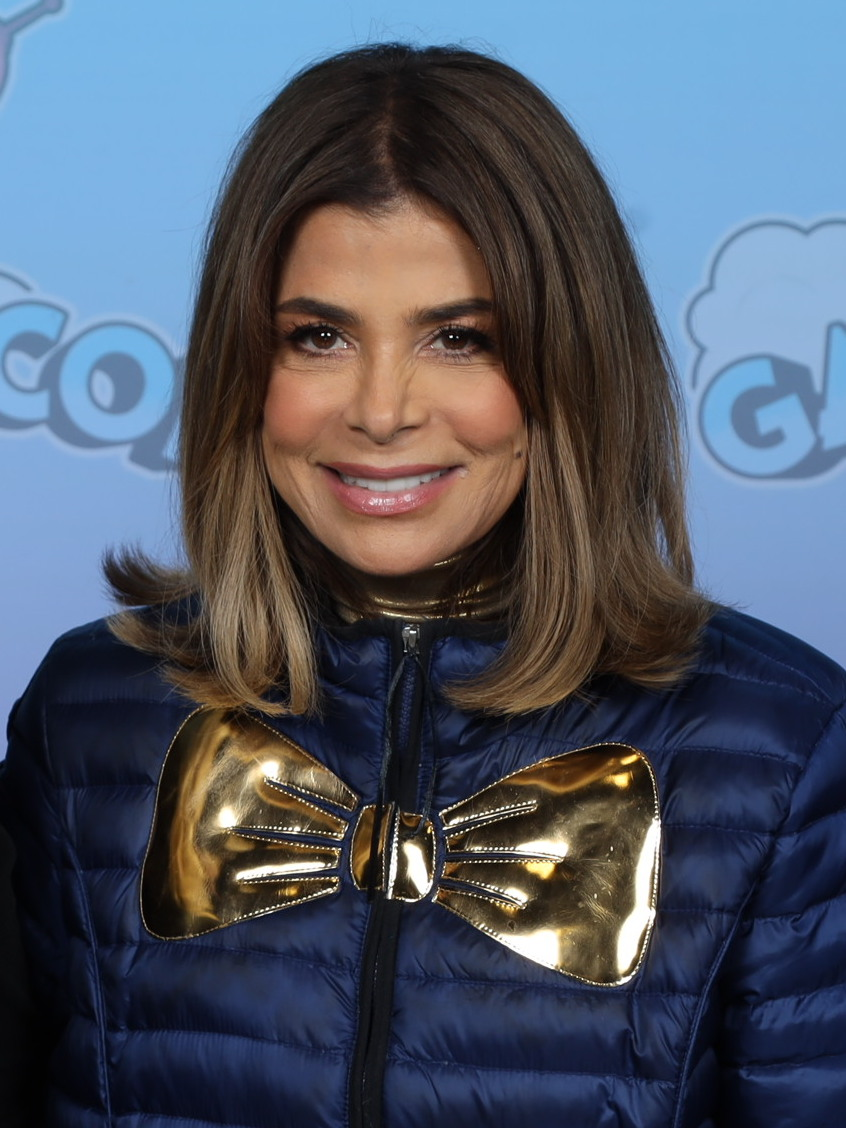
Paula Abdul (Guest)

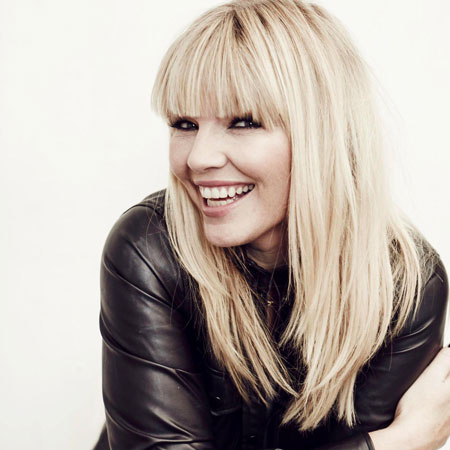
Kate Thornton (ITV1)

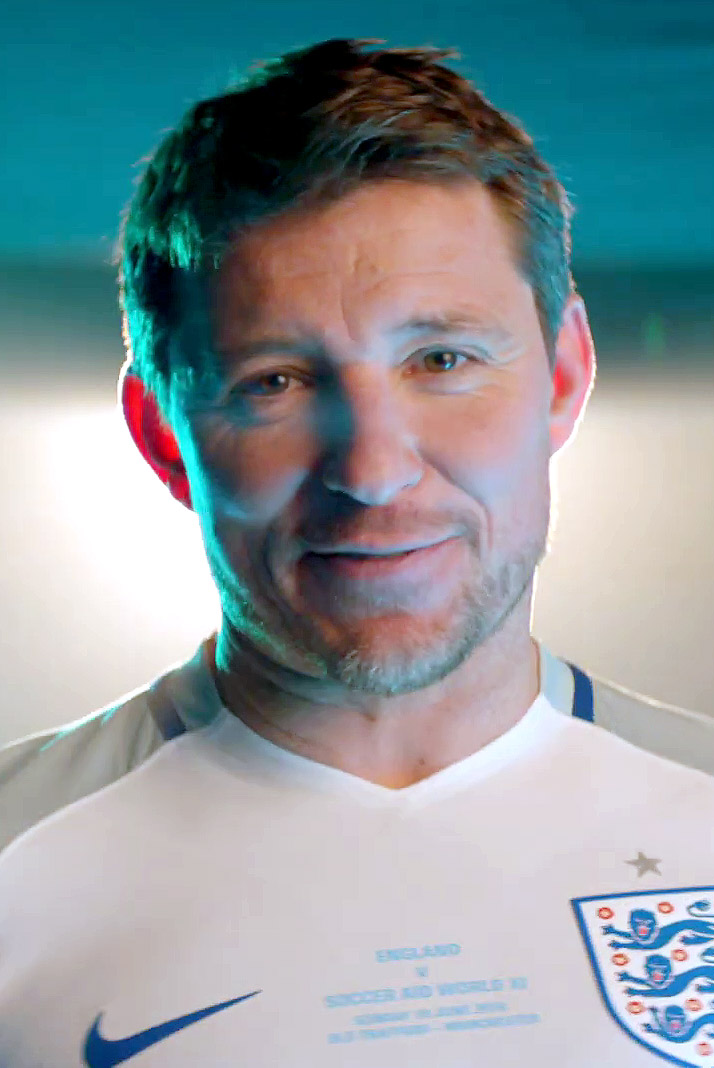
Ben Shephard (ITV2)

Simon Cowell, Sharon Osbourne and Louis Walsh all returned for their third series on the judging panel. Kate Thornton returned to present the main show on ITV, while Ben Shephard returned to present spin-off show The Xtra Factor on ITV2.

This was both Thornton and Shephard's last series of The X Factor, as Thornton announced her departure on 8 March 2007 and was replaced for the fourth series by Dermot O'Leary. Shephard also quit the show after being passed over for promotion to main presenter. He was replaced by Fearne Cotton. This is the final series to feature just three judges on the panel; from series 4, it was increased for four.

== Selection process ==
=== Auditions ===
Cities that auditions were held in.

Auditions began on 7 June 2006. Simon Cowell said on ITV's This Morning "The next international boyband or girlband is what I want to see in this year's show". 100,000 people applied to audition, the most so far. Nearly 20,000 attended an open audition at Old Trafford, Manchester on 18 June 2006.

All three judges, Cowell, Sharon Osbourne and Louis Walsh, returned. Hints by Cowell and the surrounding media that a fourth full-time judge mentoring a fourth category of contestants might be added proved to be false. However, American Idol judge Paula Abdul did make an appearance as a guest judge at the London auditions, and further celebrity guests appeared during the live shows. Auditions were held in cities around the UK and Republic of Ireland – London, Manchester, Birmingham, Dublin, Leeds, Bristol, Newcastle and Glasgow. Cowell had also stated that there could be a 14–24s category but during the audition process the category was named as 16–24s, as in the previous two series. Cowell was given the 16–24s, Osbourne had the Over 25s, and Walsh mentored the Groups. (Both rumoured changes – the lowering of the age limit and the addition of a fourth category – were actually implemented in series 4.)

=== Bootcamp ===
It was originally intended that 21 acts (seven for each judge) should remain by the conclusion of the bootcamp stage. However, Cowell decided that he had made a mistake with his seven by failing to include Ray Quinn, and asked the producers to allow one more contestant or act to go through. The other two judges were then allowed to increase their quota to eight as well, giving a total of 24 acts.

=== Judges' houses ===
In the "judges' houses" round this was cut down to 12 to go through to the live shows. Avenue were chosen to go through but were later disqualified, having misled the judges over an existing record contract with a manager who was no longer associated with the show. As a consequence of this disqualification, Eton Road were put through in their place.

Judges Houses Performances

- Contestant highlighted in bold advanced

Over 25s:

- **Ben: "With a Little Help from My Friends"**
- Katie: "Anyone Who Had a Heart"
- Jonathan: "This Love"
- **Robert: "Crazy"**
- Tiwa: "Hero"
- Lyn: "Downtown"
- **Kerry: "You've Got a Friend"**
- **Dionne: "What's Love Got to Do with It"**

Groups:

- Brother's One: "Nobody Knows"
- **The McDonald Brothers: "All I Have to Do Is Dream"**
- Pure Liberty: "Crazy in Love"
- Dolly Rockers: "Round Round"
- **The Unconventionals: "Dedicated to the One I Love"**
- **4Sure: "I Swear"**
- Avenue: "Back for Good" (originally advanced but were later disqualified)
- **Eton Road: "God Only Knows"** (originally eliminated but advanced later)

16-24s:

- **Ray: "Smile"**
- Stacey: "I Don't Want to Talk About It"
- **Ashley: "I Can't Make You Love Me"**
- Shaun: "Ben"
- Gemma: "With You I'm Born Again"
- **Leona: "Without You"**
- Carlo: "Your Song"
- **Nikitta: "Angel"**

Summary of judges' houses
Judge	Category	Location	Assistant	Acts Eliminated
Cowell	16–24s	Miami	Sinitta	Stacey Barnes, Carlo Muscatelli, Shaun Rogerson, Gemma Sampson
Osbourne	Over 25s	London	The Osbournes	Katie Angus, Jonathan Bremner, Lyn Fairbanks, Tiwa Savage
Walsh	Groups	Dublin	Shane Filan	Avenue, Brother's One, Dolly Rockers, Pure Liberty

== Acts ==
Key:

– Winner
– Runner-Up

Act	Age(s)	Hometown	Category (mentor)	Result
Leona Lewis	21	North London	16-24s (Cowell)	Winner
Ray Quinn	18	Liverpool	16-24s (Cowell)	Runner-up
Ben Mills	26	Chatham	Over 25s (Osbourne)	3rd place
The MacDonald Brothers	20	Ayrshire	Groups (Walsh)	4th place
Eton Road*	17-20	Various	Groups (Walsh)	5th place
Robert Allen	27	Essex	Over 25s (Osbourne)	6th place
Nikitta Angus	18	Glasgow	16-24s (Cowell)	7th place
Ashley McKenzie	20	Croydon	16-24s (Cowell)	8th place
Kerry McGregor†	32	West Lothian	Over 25s (Osbourne)	9th place
Dionne Mitchell	26	London	Over 25s (Osbourne)	10th place
4Sure	23-38	Various	Groups (Walsh)	11th place
The Unconventionals	25-41	Various	Groups (Walsh)	12th place

- Avenue was originally chosen to go through, but were disqualified from the competition. Eton Road took their place at the live shows.
- Kerry McGregor later died in 2012 from complications of bladder cancer.

== Live shows ==
=== Results summary ===
Colour key

16-24s

Over 25s

Groups

–	Act was in the bottom two/three and had to sing again in the final showdown
–	Act was in the bottom three but received the fewest votes and was immediately eliminated
–	Act received the fewest public votes and was immediately eliminated (no final showdown)
–	Act won the competition

Weekly results per act
Act	Week 1	Week 2	Week 3	Week 4	Week 5	Week 6	Week 7	Quarter-Final	Semi-Final	Final
Leona Lewis	Safe	Safe	Safe	Safe	Safe	Safe	Safe	Safe	Safe	Winner
Ray Quinn	Safe	Safe	Safe	Safe	Bottom Two	Safe	Safe	Safe	Safe	Runner-Up
Ben Mills	Safe	Safe	Safe	Safe	Safe	Safe	Bottom Two	Safe	3rd	Eliminated (semi-final)
The MacDonald Brothers	Safe	Safe	Safe	Safe	Safe	Safe	Safe	4th	Eliminated (quarter-final)	
Eton Road	Safe	Safe	Safe	Safe	Safe	Bottom Two	Bottom Two	Eliminated (week 7)		
Robert Allen	Safe	Bottom Two	Safe	Bottom Two	Safe	Bottom Two	Eliminated (week 6)			
Nikitta Angus	Safe	Safe	Safe	Safe	Bottom Two	Eliminated (week 5)				
Ashley McKenzie	Safe	Safe	Bottom Two	Bottom Two	Eliminated (week 4)					
Kerry McGregor	Safe	Safe	Bottom Two	Eliminated (week 3)						
Dionne Mitchell	Bottom Two	Safe	10th	Eliminated (week 3)						
4Sure	Safe	Bottom Two	Eliminated (week 2)							
The Unconventionals	Bottom Two	Eliminated (week 1)								
Final Showdown	Mitchell, The Unconventionals	4Sure, Allen	McGregor, McKenzie	Allen, McKenzie	Angus, Quinn	Allen, Eton Road	Eton Road, Mills	No final showdown or judges' votes: results were based on public votes alone		
Walsh's vote to eliminate (Groups)	Mitchell	Allen	McGregor	McKenzie	Quinn	Allen	Mills	No final showdown or judges' votes: results were based on public votes alone		
Osbourne's vote to eliminate (Over 25s)	The Unconventionals	4Sure	McKenzie	McKenzie	Angus	Eton Road	Eton Road	No final showdown or judges' votes: results were based on public votes alone		
Cowell's vote to eliminate (16-24s)	The Unconventionals	4Sure	McGregor	Allen	Angus	Allen	Eton Road	No final showdown or judges' votes: results were based on public votes alone		
Eliminated	The Unconventionals; 2 of 3 votes Majority	4Sure; 2 of 3 votes Majority	Dionne Mitchell; Public vote to save	Ashley McKenzie; 2 of 3 votes Majority	Nikitta Angus; 2 of 3 votes Majority	Robert Allen; 2 of 3 votes Majority	Eton Road; 2 of 3 votes Majority	The MacDonald Brothers; Public vote to save	Ben Mills; Public vote to save	Ray Quinn; Public vote to win
Eliminated	The Unconventionals; 2 of 3 votes Majority	4Sure; 2 of 3 votes Majority	Kerry McGregor; 2 of 3 votes Majority	Ashley McKenzie; 2 of 3 votes Majority	Nikitta Angus; 2 of 3 votes Majority	Robert Allen; 2 of 3 votes Majority	Eton Road; 2 of 3 votes Majority	The MacDonald Brothers; Public vote to save	Ben Mills; Public vote to save	Ray Quinn; Public vote to win

=== Live show details ===
==== Week 1 (14 October) ====
- Theme: Motown
- Musical guests: Lionel Richie ("I Call It Love")
- Best bits song: "That's What Friends Are For"

Acts' performances on the first live show
Act	Order	Song	Motown Artist	Result
Robert Allen	1	"All Night Long (All Night)"	Lionel Richie	Safe
Eton Road	2	"My Girl"	The Temptations	Safe
Nikitta Angus	3	"Heaven Must Have Sent You"	The Elgins	Safe
Ben Mills	4	"The Tracks of My Tears"	The Miracles	Safe
The MacDonald Brothers	5	"Three Times a Lady"	Commodores	Safe
Ray Quinn	6	"Ben"	Michael Jackson	Safe
Dionne Mitchell	7	"I'm Gonna Make You Love Me"	The Supremes	Bottom Two
The Unconventionals	8	"Dancing in the Street"	Martha and the Vandellas	Eliminated
Ashley McKenzie	9	"Easy"	Commodores	Safe
Kerry McGregor	10	"You Are the Sunshine of My Life"	Stevie Wonder	Safe
4Sure	11	"What Becomes of the Brokenhearted"	Jimmy Ruffin	Safe
Leona Lewis	12	"I'll Be There"	Jackson 5	Safe

Judges' votes to eliminate

- Walsh: Dionne Mitchell – backed his own act, The Unconventionals.
- Osbourne: The Unconventionals – backed her own act, Dionne Mitchell.
- Cowell: The Unconventionals – stated that Mitchell had performed better than The Unconventionals on the night.

==== Week 2 (21 October) ====
- Theme: Songs by Rod Stewart
- Musical guest: Rod Stewart ("It's a Heartache")
- Best bits song: "End of the Road"

Acts' performances on the second live show
Act	Order	Song	Result
Leona Lewis	1	"The First Cut Is the Deepest"	Safe
Kerry McGregor	2	"I Don't Want to Talk About It"	Safe
The MacDonald Brothers	3	"Sailing"	Safe
Ashley McKenzie	4	"I'd Rather Go Blind"	Safe
Dionne Mitchell	5	"Tonight's the Night (Gonna Be Alright)"	Safe
4Sure	6	"You're in My Heart (The Final Acclaim)"	Eliminated
Nikitta Angus	7	"Bring It On Home to Me"	Safe
Robert Allen	8	"Try a Little Tenderness"	Bottom Two
Eton Road	9	"This Old Heart of Mine (Is Weak for You)"	Safe
Ray Quinn	10	"What a Wonderful World"	Safe
Ben Mills	11	"Maggie May"	Safe

Judges' votes to eliminate

- Walsh: Robert Allen – backed his own act, 4Sure.
- Osbourne: 4Sure – backed her own act, Robert Allen.
- Cowell: 4Sure – stated that Allen had taken the panel's advice and improved his vocals.

==== Week 3 (28 October) ====
- Theme: Big band
- Musical guest: Tony Bennett ("The Best Is Yet to Come"/"For Once in My Life")
- Best bits songs: "(You Make Me Feel Like) A Natural Woman" (Dionne Mitchell) & "Over The Rainbow" (Kerry McGregor)

Cowell appeared on GMTV on the morning of Wednesday 25 October and said that "something big is going to happen this week that none of the contestants know about – a change that will shake some of them up." It was revealed on the show that this surprise was to be a double elimination. The three acts with the fewest public votes were announced as the bottom three and then the act with the fewest votes was automatically eliminated. The remaining two acts then performed in the final showdown and faced the judges' votes.

Acts' performances on the third live show
Act	Order	Song	Big Band Artist	Result
Ray Quinn	1	"Ain't That a Kick in the Head"	Dean Martin	Safe
Dionne Mitchell	2	"For Once in My Life"	Stevie Wonder	Eliminated (Fewest Public Votes)
Nikitta Angus	3	"Sway"	Michael Bublé	Safe
Ben Mills	4	"Smile"	Charlie Chaplin	Safe
The MacDonald Brothers	5	"Can't Take My Eyes Off You"	Andy Williams	Safe
Leona Lewis	6	"Summertime"	Ella Fitzgerald	Safe
Kerry McGregor	7	"They Can't Take That Away from Me"	Fred Astaire	Eliminated (Judges' Votes)
Ashley McKenzie	8	"Moondance"	Van Morrison	Bottom Three
Robert Allen	9	"Mr. Bojangles"	Sammy Davis Jr.	Safe
Eton Road	10	"Mack the Knife"	Robbie Williams	Safe

Judges' votes to eliminate

- Osbourne: Ashley McKenzie – backed her own act, Kerry McGregor.
- Cowell: Kerry McGregor – backed his own act, Ashley McKenzie.
- Walsh: Kerry McGregor – stated that McGregor had reached the limit of her abilities, whereas McKenzie still had potential to improve.

==== Week 4 (4 November) ====
- Theme: Songs by ABBA
- Musical guests: Björn Ulvaeus & The Cast of Mamma Mia! ("Mamma Mia" / "Dancing Queen")
- Best bits song: "You Give Me Something"

Acts' performances on the fourth live show
Act	Order	Song	Result
Nikitta Angus	1	"Dancing Queen"	Safe
Eton Road	2	"Does Your Mother Know"	Safe
Robert Allen	3	"Take a Chance on Me"	Bottom Two
Leona Lewis	4	"Chiquitita"	Safe
The MacDonald Brothers	5	"Fernando"	Safe
Ray Quinn	6	"Waterloo"	Safe
Ben Mills	7	"SOS"	Safe
Ashley McKenzie	8	"The Winner Takes It All"	Eliminated

Judges' votes to eliminate

- Osbourne: Ashley McKenzie – backed her own act, Robert Allen.
- Cowell: Robert Allen – backed his own act, Ashley McKenzie.
- Walsh: Ashley McKenzie – stated that Allen delivered a more polished performance on the night.

==== Week 5 (11 November) ====
- Theme: Love songs
- Musical guest: Julio Iglesias ("I Want to Know What Love Is")
- Best bits song: "One Moment in Time"

Acts' performances on the fifth live show
Act	Order	Song	Result
Ben Mills	1	"I Don't Want to Miss a Thing"	Safe
The MacDonald Brothers	2	"She's the One"	Safe
Ray Quinn	3	"Crazy Little Thing Called Love"	Bottom Two
Nikitta Angus	4	"Last Dance"	Eliminated
Eton Road	5	"From Me to You"	Safe
Leona Lewis	6	"Sorry Seems to Be the Hardest Word"	Safe
Robert Allen	7	"Always and Forever"	Safe

Judges' votes to eliminate

- Osbourne: Nikitta Angus – gave no reason; though in scenes aired on The Xtra Factor: The Aftermath, she stated that Angus did not seem comfortable in her performance until the final showdown, which ultimately came too late.
- Walsh: Ray Quinn – stated that Quinn did not have a strong enough voice to be a recording artist.
- Cowell: Nikitta Angus – gave no reason but stated that neither act deserved to be in the bottom two; though in scenes aired on the following live show, he stated that he eventually felt that the audience would want to see Quinn stay in the competition.

==== Week 6 (18 November) ====
- Theme: Number ones
- Musical guests: Westlife and Delta Goodrem ("All Out of Love")
- Best bits song: "Anytime You Need a Friend"

Acts' performances on the sixth live show
Act	Order	Song	Result
Ray Quinn	1	"Livin' la Vida Loca"	Safe
Robert Allen	2	"You Are Not Alone"	Eliminated
Eton Road	3	"I Don't Feel Like Dancin'"	Bottom Two
Leona Lewis	4	"Bridge over Troubled Water"	Safe
Ben Mills	5	"With a Little Help from My Friends"	Safe
The MacDonald Brothers	6	"Love Is All Around"	Safe

Judges' votes to eliminate

- Osbourne: Eton Road – backed her own act, Robert Allen.
- Walsh: Robert Allen – backed his own act, Eton Road.
- Cowell: Robert Allen – stated that Eton Road could progress further in the competition.

==== Week 7 (25 November) ====
- Theme: Songs from the movies
- Musical guest: Il Divo ("Desde El Día Que Te Fuiste (Without You)")
- Best bits song: "Never Forget"

Acts' performances on the seventh live show
Act	Order	First song	Film	Order	Second song	Film	Result
Leona Lewis	1	"Lady Marmalade"	Moulin Rouge!	6	"I Will Always Love You"	The Bodyguard	Safe
The MacDonald Brothers	2	"When You Say Nothing at All"	Notting Hill	7	"I'm Gonna Be (500 Miles)"	Benny & Joon	Safe
Ben Mills	3	"Live and Let Die"	Live and Let Die	8	"Your Song"	Moulin Rouge!	Bottom Two
Eton Road	4	"Everybody Needs Somebody to Love"	The Blues Brothers	9	"Can You Feel the Love Tonight"	The Lion King	Eliminated
Ray Quinn	5	"The Way You Look Tonight"	Swing Time	10	"Jailhouse Rock"	Jailhouse Rock	Safe

Judges' votes to eliminate

- Walsh: Ben Mills – backed his own act, Eton Road.
- Osbourne: Eton Road – backed her own act, Ben Mills.
- Cowell: Eton Road – stated that Mills was more talented.

==== Week 8: Quarter-Final (2 December) ====
- Themes: Songs by Barry Manilow; contestant's choice
- Musical guest: Barry Manilow ("Everybody Loves Somebody")
- Best bits song: "He Ain't Heavy, He's My Brother"

Acts' performances in the quarter-final
Act	Order	First song	Order	Second song	Result
The MacDonald Brothers	1	"Can't Smile Without You"	5	"Shang-a-Lang"	Eliminated
Ray Quinn	2	"Mandy"	6	"My Way"	Safe
Ben Mills	3	"I Made It Through the Rain"	7	"Somebody to Love"	Safe
Leona Lewis	4	"Could It Be Magic"	8	"Without You"	Safe

The quarter-final did not feature a final showdown and instead the act with the fewest public votes, The MacDonald Brothers, were automatically eliminated.

==== Week 9: Semi-Final (9 December) ====
- Theme: "Songs to get you into the final" (no specific theme)
- Musical guest: Gloria Estefan ("Anything for You" / "Can't Stay Away from You" / "Rhythm Is Gonna Get You")
- Best bits song: "Let It Be"

Acts' performances in the semi-final
Act	Order	First song	Order	Second song	Result
Ray Quinn	1	"Smile"	4	"You'll Never Walk Alone"	Safe
Leona Lewis	2	"I Have Nothing"	5	"Over the Rainbow"	Safe
Ben Mills	3	"(Everything I Do) I Do It for You"	6	"I Still Haven't Found What I'm Looking For"	Eliminated

The semi-final did not feature a final showdown and instead the act with the fewest public votes, Ben Mills, was automatically eliminated.

==== Week 10: Final (16 December) ====
- Themes: Favourite performance ("song of the series"); celebrity duets; no theme; winner's single
- Group performances: "Earth Song" (auditionees) and "That's What Friends Are For" (all finalists)
- Musical guests: Take That ("Patience") and Shaun Rogerson ("Right Here Waiting")
- Best bits songs: "Smile" & "Without You"

Acts' performances in the final
Act	Order	First song	Order	Second song	Duet Partner	Order	Third song	Order	Fourth song	Result
Ray Quinn	1	"My Way"	3	"That's Life"	Westlife	5	"Fly Me to the Moon"	7	"A Moment Like This"	Runner-Up
Leona Lewis	2	"I Will Always Love You"	4	"A Million Love Songs"	Take That	6	"All by Myself"	8	"A Moment Like This"	Winner

== Winner's single ==
Winner Leona Lewis's debut single was "A Moment Like This", and was released on 20 December 2006.

== Reception ==
=== Ratings ===
Episode	Air date	Official ITV1 rating	Weekly rank
Auditions 1	19 August	7.45	11
Auditions 2	26 August	7.36	14
Auditions 3	2 September	9.08	5
Auditions 4	9 September	7.96	11
Auditions 5	16 September	7.53	13
Auditions 6	23 September	9.17	7
Bootcamp 1	30 September	6.39	22
Bootcamp 2	30 September	8.76	10
Judges' houses 1	7 October	6.77	21
Judges' houses 2	7 October	8.95	9
Live show 1	14 October	7.52	15
Results 1	14 October	7.38	17
Live show 2	21 October	7.54	19
Results 2	21 October	7.70	18
Live show 3	28 October	7.10	21
Results 3	28 October	7.52	18
Live show 4	4 November	7.30	20
Results 4	4 November	7.91	19
Live show 5	11 November	9.83	8
Results 5	11 November	8.24	17
Live show 6	18 November	9.22	10
Results 6	18 November	8.80	13
Live show 7	25 November	8.46	15
Results 7	25 November	8.69	13
Live show 8	2 December	9.31	11
Results 8	2 December	8.24	17
Live show 9	9 December	8.39	13
Results 9	9 December	8.25	16
Live final	16 December	10.52	4
Live final results	16 December	10.78	3
Series average	2006	8.27	—N/a
