= The Meaning of Love (Michelle McManus song) =

Single by Michelle

from the album The Meaning of Love
- A-side: "The Meaning of Love"
- Released: 5 April 2004
- Recorded: 2004
- Genre: Pop
- Length: 4:24 (album version); 3:10 (radio edit)
- Label: 19; S; BMG
- Songwriters: Karen Poole; Steve Robson
- Producer: Steve Robson

Michelle singles chronology
"All This Time" (2003)	"The Meaning of Love" (2004)	"Take You There" (2012)

"The Meaning of Love" is a song by Scottish singer Michelle McManus, released as the second and final single from her debut album The Meaning of Love (2004) on 5 April 2004. Written and produced by Steve Robson, with additional songwriting credits from Karen Poole, it failed to replicate the commercial success of her debut single "All This Time", reaching number 16 in the United Kingdom and number 29 in Ireland. It fared better commercially in her native Scotland, where it reached the top ten of the Scottish Singles Charts where it peaked at number seven.

== Reception ==
Daily Record critic John Dingwall called the song a "great ballad"; a colleague of his, however, wrote: "Michelle's going to have to aim much higher... 'The Meaning of Love', while good, isn't great." Writing for AllMusic, journalist Sharon Mawer described the track as "a charity sounding record without the All Saints rhythm [of 'All This Time'], without the multi-vocals, and without much of a tune either".

== Commercial performance ==
Following its release, the song debuted at number sixteen on the UK Singles Charts, remaining in the top forty of the charts in the United Kingdom for a further week. It spent an additional two weeks within the Top 100, before last appearing at number sixty-four before falling out of the chart entirely.

In her native Scotland, it performed better, debuting at number seven on the Scottish Singles Charts, remaining within the Top 100 of the singles charts in Scotland for five weeks. In the Republic of Ireland, it spent one week on the Irish Singles Charts following a debut appearance of twenty–nine. Overall, the single did not chart as well as expected and achieved moderate commercial success in both the United Kingdom and Ireland, whilst in Scotland, it achieved significantly better commercial success.

Despite this, it was considered a flop, with sales of only 8,000 in its first week, one newspaper drew comparisons of McManus' fortunes to Popstars: The Rivals rejects One True Voice. Soon after the single's commercial failure, BMG dropped McManus from the label.

== Track listing ==
UK CD single

1. "The Meaning of Love" (radio edit)
2. "Believe"
3. "Tell Me Now"
4. "The Meaning of Love" (enhanced section including music video)

UK digital download

1. "The Meaning of Love" (album version)

== Charts ==
Charts (2004)	Peak position
Ireland (IRMA)	29
Scottish Singles Sales (Official Charts)	7
UK Singles (Official Charts)	16
UK Physical Singles Chart (OCC)	16
