= AXM =

Former British magazine for gay and bisexual men

- Editor: Matt Miles
- Categories: Gay
- Frequency: Monthly
- Founded: 1999
- Final issue: 24 November, Digital: 2008 – present
- Company: Millivres Prowler Group Ltd.
- Country: United Kingdom
- Website: www.axm-mag.com
- ISSN: 1473-0529

AXM was a British lifestyle magazine aimed at young gay and bisexual men.

The magazine ceased publication of printed magazines after December 2008 due to financial downturn. It was subsequently converted to an online-only format, but only one edition was ever produced.

== History and profile ==
The magazine was started in 1999 as a monthly publication and was called Axiom, alongside a weekly newspaper with the name Axiom News. Its content was heavily based on fashion, sex and health-related features as well as celebrity interviews and columnists. It also had reviews on music, film and gay nightlife.

It was owned by Millivres Prowler Group who acquired it from Blue Maverick Media in April 2006 Millivres Prowler are also the publishers of Gay Times, which targets a generally older readership with more political coverage.

AXM was given a new look for its January 2008 issue, having previously titled itself in lowercase. It was created by Paul Disney in 1996 as a guide to gay men's health including HIV. It went from a freebie magazine on the gay scene to a paid for publication in 1999. For its time it was a forward thinking magazine that used irony and an ability to laugh at itself in getting messages over to the gay community concerning health issues that needed addressing such as why is it that gay men are more prone to depression than their straight counterparts etc.

== See also ==
- attitude (magazine)
- Gay Times
