= Lynsey Hanley =

British writer and academic

- Born: 12 April 1976 (age 50); Solihull, West Midlands, England
- Education: Queen Mary University of London (BA)
- Occupations: Columnist; author

Lynsey Hanley (born 12 April 1976) is a British writer and academic.

== Biography ==
Hanley was born in Solihull and grew up on a council estate in the suburb of Chelmsley Wood. She studied English at Queen Mary University of London.

Hanley is a visiting fellow in cultural history at Liverpool John Moores University. She is the author of Estates: an Intimate History and Respectable: Crossing the Class Divide, and was a regular contributor to The Guardian from 2005 to 2022. As of 2020, she was writing a book about "the cultural, ecological and social significnace" of public transport. A frequent theme of Hanley's work is social mobility, often based on her own journey from a working-class background to attending university and becoming a writer. In June 2025, Hanley published a letter in support of transgender inclusivity.

As of 2023 she lives in Liverpool.

== Bibliography ==
- Estates: an Intimate History (2007)
- Respectable: Crossing the Class Divide (2016)
