= The Wanted (disambiguation) =

The Wanted are a British-Irish boy band.

The Wanted may also refer to:

- The Wanted (album), by the Wanted, 2010
- The Wanted (EP), by the Wanted, 2012

== See also ==
- Wanted (disambiguation)
