= Wanted =

Wanted may refer to:

== Law enforcement ==
- Fugitive, a person wanted by the authorities
- Wanted poster, a poster put up to inform the public of one or more criminals whom authorities wish to apprehend

== Film ==
- Wanted!, a 1937 British comedy film
- Wanted (1967 film), an Italian western
- Wanted, an Indian Kannada-language film of 1993
- Wanted (1961 film), an Indian Hindi-language film
- Wanted (2004 film), an Indian Malayalam-language thriller
- Wanted (2008 film), an American action film based on the comics series (see below)
- Wanted (2009 film), a Bollywood film starring Salman Khan
- Wanted (2010 film), an Indian Bengali film starring Jeet
- Wanted (2011 film), an Indian Telugu film starring Gopichand
- Wanted (2015 film), an American Western pornographic film

== Literature ==
- Wanted (comics), a 2003–2005 comic book limited series by Mark Millar and J. G. Jones
- Wanted (manga), a 2005 Japanese manga series by Matsuri Hino
- Wanted (Pretty Little Liars), a 2010 Pretty Little Liars novel by Sara Shepard
- Wanted, a 2006 Hardy Boys Undercover Brothers Super Mysteries novel
- Wanted!, a 1992 manga by Eiichiro Oda

== Music ==
=== Artists ===
- The Wanted, a British-Irish boy band (since 2009)
- Wanted (band), a 2004–2012 South Korean boy band

=== Albums ===
- The Wanted (album), by the Wanted, 2010
- Wanted (Bow Wow album), 2005
- Wanted (Cliff Richard album), 2001
- Wanted (Dara Maclean album) or the title song, 2013
- Wanted (Wande Coal album) or the title song, 2015
- Wanted (Yazz album), 1988
- Wanted! The Outlaws, by Waylon Jennings, Willie Nelson, Jessi Colter, and Tompall Glaser, 1976
- Wanted (soundtrack), from the 2008 film
- Wanted, by Jayne Denham, 2021

=== EPs ===
- The Wanted (EP), by the Wanted, 2012

=== Songs ===
- "Wanted" (Alan Jackson song), 1990
- "Wanted" (The Dooleys song), 1979
- "Wanted" (Hunter Hayes song), 2011
- "Wanted" (Jessie James song), 2009
- "Wanted" (NOTD and Daya song), 2019
- "Wanted" (OneRepublic song), 2019
- "Wanted" (Perry Como song), 1954
- "Wanted" (Tiwa Savage song), 2013
- "Wanted (Shimei Tehai)", by Pink Lady, 1977
- "Wanted", by the Cranberries from Everybody Else Is Doing It, So Why Can't We?, 1993
- "Wanted", by Todrick Hall from Forbidden, 2018
- "Wanted", by Vanessa Carlton from Be Not Nobody, 2002
- "Wanted", by White Town from Women in Technology, 1997

== Theater ==
- Wanted (musical), a 2020 musical originally titled Gun & Powder

== Television ==
=== Programs and series ===
- Wanted (1955 TV program), a program that debuted on the 1955–56 United States network television schedule
- Wanted (game show), a 1996–1997 UK reality competition series
- Wanted (2005 TV series), an American police drama
- Wanted (2013 TV program), an Australian true crime show
- Wanted (2016 Australian TV series), a drama series
- Wanted (South Korean TV series), a 2016 crime thriller series
- Wanted sa Radyo, a Philippine public service program

=== Episodes ===
- "Wanted" (NCIS: Los Angeles), 2013
- "Wanted" (Only Fools and Horses), 1983
- "Wanted" (Animator vs. Animation), 2023

== Video games ==
- Wanted (video game), a 1989 third-person, shoot 'em up arcade game
- Wanted: Dead, a 2023 action video game
- Wanted: Weapons of Fate, a game based on the 2008 film

== See also ==
- Classified ad, a want ad
- Wanted Dead or Alive (disambiguation)
- Want (disambiguation)
- The Wanted (disambiguation)
- Unwanted (disambiguation)
