= Want (disambiguation) =

A want is something that is desired.

Want or The Want may also refer to:

== Arts, entertainment and media ==
=== Music ===
==== Bands ====
- The Want (DC band), a rock band
- The Want (New Jersey band), a stoner/blues rock band

==== Albums ====
- Want (3OH!3 album), 2008
- Want (Rufus Wainwright album), 2005
- Want (EP), by Lee Tae-min, 2019
- Want (Esther Rose album), 2025

==== Songs ====
- "Want" (Natalie Imbruglia song), 2009
- "Want!" (Berryz Kobo song), 2012
- "Want", a song by Disturbed from the 2000 album The Sickness
- "Want", a song by The Cure from the 1996 album Wild Mood Swings
- "Want", a song by Hunter Brothers from the 2019 album State of Mind

=== Other uses in arts, entertainment and media ===
- The Want (short film), by Stephen Saux and Lori Murphy Saux, 2019
- Want, a character in Charles Dickens's A Christmas Carol
- WANT, an FM radio station in Lebanon, Tennessee, U.S.
- "Want", an episode of Law & Order: Criminal Intent (season 4)

== Other uses ==
- Want (surname), several people, including

- Becky Want (born 1961), an English radio presenter
- Richard Want (fl. 1692–1696), a pirate active in the Indian Ocean

- Incentive salience, a cognitive process that confers a "desire" or "want" attribute

== See also ==
- Desire (disambiguation)
- Wanted (disambiguation)
- Wanting (disambiguation)
- Want Want, a Chinese food manufacturer
