= Wont =

A wont is a habit, or routine of behavior that is repeated regularly and tends to occur subconsciously.

Wont may also refer to:

- Won't, the English contraction for will not

Broadcast stations

- WBYD-CD 39 Johnstown, Pennsylvania, a TV station that used the callsign WONT-LP from January 2001 to February 2002
- 101.1 WUPY Ontonagon, Michigan, an FM station that used the callsign WONT from 1983 to 1989

== See also ==
- Want (disambiguation)
