= Wanting (disambiguation) =

Wanting is the desire for something that is lacking.

Wanting may also refer to:

- Desire, the emotion of longing or hoping for a person, object, or outcome

== Arts and entertainment ==
- The Wanting (Glenn Jones album), 2011 album by Glenn Jones
- The Wanting (Cody Jinks album), 2019
- Wanting (novel), by Richard Flanagan, 2008

== People ==
- Mira Wanting (1978–2012), Danish actress
- Ling Wan Ting (born 1980), Hong Kong badminton player
- Wan-Ting Su (born 1982), Taiwanese artist
- Wanting Qu (born 1984), or Wanting, Chinese-Canadian singer-songwriter
- Liu Wanting (born 1989), Chinese tennis player
- Chen Wan-ting (born 1990), Taiwanese volleyball player
- Lin Wan-ting (born 1996), Taiwanese taekwondo practitioner

== Other uses ==
- Wanting County, or Yuanqu County, a former county of imperial China
- Wanting: The Power of Mimetic Desire in Everyday Life, 2021 book by Luke Burgis
- Wanding in Ruili, Yunnan Province, China

== See also ==
- Want (disambiguation)
