= Gold Forever =

2011 single by The Wanted

Single by The Wanted

from the album Battleground
- Released: 13 March 2011
- Recorded: 2010
- Genre: Dance-pop; electropop
- Length: 3:57
- Label: Geffen
- Songwriters: Steve Mac; Wayne Hector; Claude Kelly
- Producer: Steve Mac

The Wanted singles chronology
"Lose My Mind" (2010)	"Gold Forever" (2011)	"Glad You Came" (2011)

The Wanted US singles chronology
"Glad You Came" (2011)	"Gold Forever" (2012)	"Lightning" (2012)

Alternative cover
- U.S. cover

Music video
- "Gold Forever" on YouTube

"Gold Forever" is a dance-pop song by British-Irish boy band The Wanted. It was produced by Steve Mac, who also co-wrote the song with Wayne Hector and Claude Kelly. It is the band's fourth overall single, and was released as the lead single from their second studio album, Battleground, on 13 March 2011, and later as a promo single from the band's 2012 American debut release, The Wanted (EP). It was also the official 2011 Comic Relief charity single. "Gold Forever" debuted at number three on the UK Singles Chart, becoming the band's third top-ten single.

Following member Tom Parker's death, an acoustic version of the song, which was originally played at his funeral on 20 April 2022, was made available on music download and streaming platforms a week later, with all proceeds going to The Brain Tumour Charity.

== Background ==
"Gold Forever" was written by Steve Mac, Wayne Hector and Claude Kelly, and it was produced by Mac. Steve Mac and Wayne Hector previously wrote the band's debut single "All Time Low" (2010) which charted at number one in the UK. It was announced as the lead single from The Wanted's upcoming second studio album and the 2011 Comic Relief single on 10 February 2011. It was described as "a ballad you can rave to". Band member Max George explained the meaning of the song: "This song is about a day in your life that you never forget. It's an upbeat, feel-good track and our favourite so far. We're really excited to get it out there, and delighted that it is supporting such a great cause." The Wanted performed "Gold Forever" live on Red Nose Day 2011 on 18 March 2011. They also performed it live on BBC Radio 1's Live Lounge on 16 March 2011.

== Reception ==
Lewis Corner from Digital Spy gave the song four stars out of five, describing it as having "a winning mix of thumping beats, melancholic synths and a twinkling piano hook that sounds like Coldplay having a Sunday School sing-along. Throw in some intermittent blasts of electro-trance and the result is a number that is not only chart-friendly, but one that makes for a welcome change of pace from the recent slew of cover charity singles." Ann Lee of Metro gave the song a negative review writing, "It's getting quite hard to tell the members of The Wanted apart seeing as they all sound the same with the harsh distortion of Auto-Tune. Fans of dance tracks tinged with a soppy edge and cheesy Euro beats will like this." On 20 March, "Gold Forever" entered the UK Singles Chart at number 3, behind Adele's "Someone Like You" and Nicole Scherzinger's "Don't Hold Your Breath". The song slipped to number 4 the following week.

== Tom Parker tribute ==
Following The Wanted member Tom Parker's death from a brain tumour on 30 March 2022, "Gold Forever" surged in sales and streams. The song debuted at number 2 on the UK Official Singles Sales Top 100 on 1 April 2022.

On 27 April 2022, The Wanted released a new, stripped-back version of the song, titled "Gold Forever (For Tom)" in tribute. All proceeds of the single sales will be donated to The Brain Tumour Charity.

== Track listing ==
- CD single
1. "Gold Forever" – 3:57
2. "Gold Forever" (Steve Smart and Westfunk Radio Edit) – 4:18
3. "Gold Forever" (Steve Smart and Westfunk Remix) – 6:45
- Digital single
1. "Gold Forever" – 3:57
2. "Gold Forever" (Moto Blanco Radio Edit) – 4:14
3. "Gold Forever" (Moto Blanco Remix) – 7:19
- Digital download
1. "Gold Forever" – 3:57

== Charts ==
=== Weekly charts ===
2011–2012 Weekly chart performance for "Gold Forever"
Chart (2011–2012)	Peak position
Canada Hot 100 (Billboard)	86
Ireland (IRMA)	13
Scotland Singles (Official Charts)	2
UK Singles (Official Charts)	3
UK Airplay (Music Week)	8

2024 Weekly chart performance for "Gold Forever"
Chart (2024)	Peak position
Estonia Airplay (TopHit)	87

=== Year-end charts ===
Chart (2011)	position
UK Singles (Official Charts Company)	98

== Certifications ==
Region	Certification	Certified units/sales
United Kingdom (BPI)	Silver	200,000^{^}
^{^} Shipments figures based on certification alone.

== Release history ==
Region	Date	Format	Label
United Kingdom	13 March 2011	Digital download	Geffen
United Kingdom	14 March 2011	CD single	Geffen
United States	20 March 2012	Digital download	Geffen
