= Comic Relief =

British charity

- Genre: Charity telethon
- Created by: Richard Curtis; Lenny Henry
- Presented by: Current; as of 2026: Joel Dommett; Davina McCall; Catherine Tate; Nick Mohammed; Katherine Ryan (Former: See full list)
- Country of origin: United Kingdom
- Original language: English

Production
- Production locations: BBC Television Centre (1988–2013); The London Palladium (2015); The O2 (2017); BBC Elstree Centre (2019–2021); Dock10 (2022–present)
- Camera setup: Multi-camera
- Running time: Various
- Production company: BBC Studios Entertainment Productions

Original release
- Network: BBC One; BBC Two
- Release: 5 February 1988 – present

Related
- Children in Need (1980–present); Sport Relief (2002–2020); The Big Night In (2020)

Comic Relief is a British charity, founded in 1985 by the comedy scriptwriter Richard Curtis and comedian Sir Lenny Henry in response to the 1983–1985 famine in Ethiopia. The concept of Comic Relief was to get British comedians to make the public laugh, while raising money to help people around the world and in the United Kingdom. Samir Patel was announced as CEO in January 2021.

The highlight of Comic Relief's appeal is Red Nose Day, an annual (previously biennial) telethon held in March. The first live fundraising evening, held on 4 April 1986, featured comedians and pop stars, including Rowan Atkinson, Billy Connolly, Stephen Fry, Kate Bush and co-founder Lenny Henry.

A prominent annual event on British television, Comic Relief is one of two high-profile telethon events held in the UK, the other being Children in Need held annually in November. At the end of the Red Nose Day telethon on 14 March 2015, it was announced that in the 30-year history of Comic Relief, the Red Nose Day and Sport Relief appeals had raised in excess of £1.4 billion.

== Red Nose Day history ==
Comic Relief was launched live on Noel Edmonds' Late, Late Breakfast Show on BBC1, on Christmas Day 1985 from a refugee camp in Sudan.

On 4, 5 and 6 April 1986 the inaugural live fundraising show, "Comic Relief Utterly Utterly Live", was staged at the Shaftesbury Theatre in London featuring popular alternative comedians and pop stars including Rowan Atkinson, Billy Connolly, Stephen Fry, Lenny Henry, Kate Bush and Cliff Richard. The show was broadcast on BBC1 on the 25th April 1986. An audio recording was released on WEA, which included a live performance of the charity single "Living Doll" by Cliff Richard and the Young Ones.

The highlight of Comic Relief is Red Nose Day. On 8 February 1988, Lenny Henry went to Ethiopia and celebrated the very first Red Nose Day telethon. More than 150 celebrities and comedians participated. The event raised £15 million and attracted 30 million television viewers on BBC1. To date, Richard Curtis and Lenny Henry are still active participants of the Red Nose Day telethon, which continues to raise funds for numerous charities that help children in need and tackle worldwide poverty.

The charity says its aim is to "bring about positive and lasting change in the lives of poor and disadvantaged people, which we believe requires investing in work that addresses people's immediate needs as well as tackling the root causes of poverty and injustice". One of the fundamental principles behind working at Comic Relief is the "Golden Pound Principle" where every donated pound (£) is spent on charitable projects. All operating costs, such as staff salaries, are covered by corporate sponsors, or interest earned on money waiting to be distributed.

Its main supporters are the BBC, BT Group, TK Maxx, and British Airways. The BBC is responsible for the live television extravaganza on Red Nose Day; BT provides the telephony, and TK Maxx sells merchandise on behalf of the charity. Until 2022, Sainsbury's sold Red Noses in their Supermarkets, Local Stores and Petrol Stations.

In 2002, Comic Relief and BBC Sport teamed up to create Sport Relief, a new initiative, aiming to unite the sporting community and culminate in a night of sport, entertainment and fundraising on BBC One. Sport Relief was a biennial charity event, and the campaign deliberately alternated years with Red Nose Day, Comic Relief's flagship event. Red Nose Day occurs in odd-numbered years, and Sport Relief in even-numbered years.

In 2009, Comic Relief launched a website calling for a financial transaction tax, the "Robin Hood" tax. On 14 March 2015, at the end of that year's Red Nose Day telethon it was announced that in the 30-year history of Comic Relief, the Red Nose Day and Sport Relief appeals had raised in excess of £1bn (£1,047,083,706).

In 2021 it was announced that Red Nose Day would become an annual event and, starting from 2022, there would be no more Sport Relief telethons. From the same year onwards, the appeal shows of Red Nose Day would now take place at the former Sport Relief studio at Dock10, MediaCityUK in Salford. In 2024, on Lenny Henry's final telethon as a presenter, he revealed that the overall £1 billion announced in 2015 had risen to more than £1.6 billion (£1,602,539,154).

== On television ==
The television programming begins in the afternoon, with CBBC having various related reports, money raising events and celebrity gunging. This is all in-between the regular programmes, but after the six o'clock news, the normal BBC One schedule is suspended at 7 pm in favour of a live show, with a break at 10 pm for the regular news programme. Whilst the BBC News at Ten is aired on BBC One, Comic Relief continues on BBC Two, and then resumes on BBC One at 10:35 pm and continues until late, with each hour overseen by a different celebrity team. These celebrities do the work free, as do the crew, with studio space and production facilities donated by the BBC. For this reason, it is common to see stars who are otherwise under contract to other rival broadcasters, such as ITV or Channel 4, appearing.

Regular themes throughout the shows include parodies of recent popular shows, films and clips, events, and specially filmed versions of comedy shows. Smith and Jones, and a parody sketch starring Rowan Atkinson were both regularly featured.

=== Presenters ===
Current/upcoming presenters, as of the 2026 telethon, are highlighted in bold:

- Lenny Henry (1988–2007, 2011–2022, 2024)
- Griff Rhys Jones (1988–1993, 1999)
- Jonathan Ross (1988–1995, 1999–2013, 2017, 2025)
- Chris Evans (1995, 2005–2007)
- Ant & Dec (2001–2003)
- Zoe Ball (2001, 2019, 2022–2023)
- **Davina McCall** (2003–2015, 2021, 2024–present)
- Adam Buxton (2003)
- Joe Cornish (2003)
- Bob Mortimer (2003)
- Graham Norton (2003–2011, 2017)
- Vic Reeves (2003)
- Dermot O'Leary (2005, 2011–2013)
- Fearne Cotton (2007–2011, 2015)
- Russell Brand (2007, 2013, 2017)
- Jeremy Clarkson (2007)
- Nick Frost (2007)
- Richard Hammond (2007)
- James May (2007)
- Paul O'Grady (2007)
- Simon Pegg (2007)
- Kate Thornton (2007)
- Alan Carr (2009–2013)
- James Corden (2009)
- Tess Daly (2009, 2015)
- Noel Fielding (2009, 2017)
- Mathew Horne (2009)
- David Tennant (2009, 2013, 2019–2024)
- Claudia Winkleman (2009–2015)
- Reggie Yates (2009)
- Kevin Bridges (2011)
- Jimmy Carr (2011)
- Michael McIntyre (2011–2013)
- Jack Whitehall (2011–2013)
- John Bishop (2013–2015)
- Rob Brydon (2013)
- David Walliams (2013–2015)
- Sarah Millican (2015)
- Greg James (2015)
- Rob Beckett (2017–2019)
- Greg Davies (2017)
- Warwick Davis (2017)
- Miranda Hart (2017)
- Joe Lycett (2017)
- Sally Phillips (2017)
- Romesh Ranganathan (2017–2019, 2024)
- Luisa Omielan (2017)
- Richard Osman (2017)
- Clara Amfo (2019)
- Alesha Dixon (2019–2022, 2025)
- Paddy McGuinness (2019–2024)
- Joe Sugg (2019)
- Emma Willis (2019, 2025)
- Jason Manford (2021)
- Amanda Holden (2021)
- AJ Odudu (2022)
- Vernon Kay (2022)
- **Joel Dommett** (2023–present)
- Maya Jama (2024)
- Rosie Ramsay (2024–2025)
- Alison Hammond (2025)
- Rylan Clark (2025)
- Tom Allen (2025)
- Asim Chaudhry (2025)
- **Catherine Tate** (as Joanie "Nan" Taylor and Lauren Cooper) (2026)
- **Nick Mohammed** (2026)
- **Katherine Ryan** (2026)
- La Voix (2026)
- Jill Scott (2026)

== 1980s and 1990s ==
=== 1988 event ===
The First Red Nose Day was held on Friday 5 February 1988 and raised £15 million.

=== 1989 event ===
The Second Red Nose Day was held on Friday 10 March 1989 with the slogan: "Red Nose Day 2", and raised £27 million. This is also when the event would start generally being scheduled in mid-March, often close to, or on 17 March – Saint Patrick's Day.

=== 1991 event ===
The Third Red Nose Day was held on Friday 15 March 1991 with the slogan "The Stonker", and raised £20 million. The charity song was a double A-sided single featuring "The Stonk" performed by Hale & Pace and "The Smile Song" performed by Victoria Wood.

=== 1993 event ===
The Fourth Red Nose Day was held on Friday 12 March 1993 with the slogan "The Invasion of the Comic Tomatoes", and raised £18 million.

=== 1995 event ===
The Fifth Red Nose Day was held on the same day as St. Patrick's Day which is Friday 17 March 1995, with the slogan "What A Difference A Day Makes", and raised £22 million.

=== 1997 event ===
The 1997 Red Nose Day event was held on 14 March with the slogan "Small Change – Big Difference". The event raised more than £27m for charitable causes. The Spice Girls song "Who Do You Think You Are?" was the official Comic Relief single with 672,577 physical copies sold. The telethon featured an appearance from Father Ted Crilly (Dermot Morgan) and Father Dougal McGuire (Ardal O'Hanlon), characters from the sitcom Father Ted.

=== 1999 event ===
The 1999 Red Nose Day was held on 12 March and raised more than £35m. Perennial hosts Jonathan Ross and Lenny Henry were joined by Davina McCall, Chris Evans, Ben Elton, Jack Dee and Julian Clary, with Peter Snow providing regular updates on donations. Angus Deayton hosted a live cross-over panel game, Have I Got Buzzcocks All Over. A parody of the Doctor Who series starring Rowan Atkinson as the Doctor, Doctor Who and the Curse of Fatal Death, was featured during the show, as was Wetty Hainthropp Investigates (a Victoria Wood parody of Hetty Wainthropp Investigates), The Naughty Boys (a mock 1967 pilot for Men Behaving Badly) and guest appearance by Rex the Runt.

On Radio 1, Simon Mayo set the record of 37 hours of consecutive broadcasting (which was later broken in March 2011 by Chris Moyles and Comedy Dave on the same station for 52 hours, "BBC Radio 1's Longest Show Ever with Chris Moyles and Comedy Dave for Comic Relief", the world record for the longest show in radio history). The 1999 Comic Relief song was "When the Going Gets Tough" by Boyzone.

== 2000s ==
=== 2001 event ===
The 2001 Red Nose Day was held on 16 March. The total raised was £55 million. As well as donations on the night of the TV show, money is raised from countrywide sponsored events and from merchandising, particularly of the red noses themselves. Celebrity Big Brother 1 was produced in honour of Comic Relief, with the finale airing as part of the Red Nose Day festivities.

=== 2003 event ===
The 2003 Red Nose Day was held on 14 March. The fund raising activities included Lenny Henry providing the voice of the speaking clock between 10 and 23 March with the cost of the call going to Comic Relief. On the night of the live show itself, £35m was raised, an on-the-night record. A total of £61.6 million was raised that year, setting a new record.

Jack Dee stood outside at the top of a pole for the duration of the show, parodying the acts of David Blaine. Celebrity Driving School led up to the event, with the test results announced during the telethon: they all failed.

The hosts of Red Nose Day 2003 were: Jonathan Ross, Lenny Henry, Anthony McPartlin, Declan Donnelly, Vic Reeves, Bob Mortimer, Graham Norton, Adam Buxton and Joe Cornish.

==== Shows included ====
As usual a variety of specially filmed versions of television shows were made. Popular BBC talent show Fame Academy returned as Comic Relief does Fame Academy. Other shows included EastEnders, Auf Wiedersehen, Pet, University Challenge and Celebrity Driving School.

Harry Potter and the Secret Chamberpot of Azerbaijan, a parody of Harry Potter, starring Dawn French as Harry Potter, Jennifer Saunders as Ron Weasley and Miranda Richardson as Hermione Granger.

=== 2005 event ===
The 2005 Red Nose Day was held on 11 March, and was hosted by a collection of television stars: these were Chris Evans, Lenny Henry, Davina McCall, Graham Norton, Dermot O'Leary and Jonathan Ross. The 2005 event was also noteworthy for supporting the Make Poverty History campaign – many of the videos recorded for the MPH campaign (including videos by Bono and Nelson Mandela) were shown throughout the evening. £65m was raised.

==== Shows included ====
As usual a variety of specially filmed versions of television shows were made. Popular BBC talent show Comic Relief does Fame Academy was attended by celebrities singing cover versions of songs. Viewers voted for their favourite, with the proceeds going to the cause and the celebrity. Other shows included Absolutely Fabulous, Little Britain I Want That One, The Vicar of Dibley, Green Wing, Spider-Plant Man, a parody of Spider-Man starring Rowan Atkinson, and My Family.

McFly released the official single, a double A-side of "All About You/You've Got a Friend", which reached Number 1 in the UK Singles Chart, and also Number 1 in the Irish Singles Chart. The cover is predominantly red and features the members of McFly dressed in red, wearing red noses, in honour of Red Nose Day.

=== 2007 event ===
2007's Red Nose Day was held on 16 March. Its tagline was "The Big One", which was also representative of the novelty nose. Walkers, Kleenex and Andrex also promoted the charity, as well as Sainsbury's. The event raised £67.7 million.

=== 2009 event ===
The 2009 event took place on Friday 13 March 2009. Fundraisers had three different nose designs to choose from: "this one", "that one" and "the other one" – all with different facial expressions. The Saturdays provided the official single, a cover of "Just Can't Get Enough". The event raised £82.3 million.

== 2010s ==
=== 2011 event ===
The 2011 event took place on Friday 18 March 2011. £74.3 million was raised on the night, the highest ever 'on the night' total. This was subsequently beaten by £0.8 million on Red Nose Day 2013's on-the-night event. The total for the whole campaign was £108.4 million, the then highest raised for one event.

In addition to the continued absence of Rowan Atkinson, two more prominent supporters of the charity were absent for 2011 – this was the first ever Comic Relief event to feature no input from Dawn French, and the first for more than 10 years not to feature input from Matt Lucas. Similarly, several other frequent contributors from previous years appeared only in appeal films or as part of the 24 Hour Panel People event. Lenny Henry however finally returned after an absence to perform comedic material.

=== 2013 event ===
The 2013 event took place on Friday 15 March 2013. By the end of the night, Comic Relief raised £75,107,852. In total that year Comic Relief raised £100.3 million.

One Direction recorded the official single "One Way or Another", a medley of Blondie's "One Way or Another" and "Teenage Kicks" by The Undertones. The single was released on 17 February 2013.

=== 2015 event ===
The 2015 event took place on Friday 13 March 2015. It was broadcast live for the first time at the London Palladium, with £99.4 million being raised.

=== 2017 event ===
The 2017 event took place on Friday 24 March 2017, broadcast live from Building Six at The O2 in London. It was widely criticised, for both the quality of sound, sketches, and going from films on poverty to a biscuit competition. The event raised £82.1 million.

=== 2019 event ===
The 2019 event took place on Friday 15 March 2019 live from BBC Elstree Centre. The event raised £63,548,668.

== 2020s ==
=== 2021 event ===
The 2021 event took place on Friday 19 March 2021. The event raised £52 million and was once again hosted by Sir Lenny Henry alongside Davina McCall, Paddy McGuinness, David Tennant and Alesha Dixon.

Sketches included a crossover between Catherine Tate's Nan character and James Bond (Daniel Craig), a Comic Relief Zoom meeting featuring Jack Whitehall and various celebrities and a trailer for 2020 – The Movie featuring Keira Knightley, Michael Sheen, Jodie Whittaker, KSI, Anna Friel and Dame Joan Collins. Sheen and Tennant also starred in a special edition of their TV show Staged while McGuinness and his Top Gear co-stars, Freddie Flintoff and Chris Harris were asked questions by children in a segment hosted by Radio 1's Jordan North. The Vicar of Dibley's Geraldine Granger (played by Dawn French) appeared alongside the Reverend Kate Bottley to open the show. There were musical performances from The Proclaimers, Gabrielle and the cast of Back to the Future the Musical. After the main show, Amanda Holden and Jason Manford presented The Great Comic Relief Prizeathon.

=== 2022 event ===
Red Nose Day took place on 18 March 2022.

Some of 2022's fundraising challenges that took place prior to the main televised event included a 100-mile river challenge, which saw BBC Radio 1 presenter Jordan North rowing from London to Burnley, and Tom Daley's Homecoming Challenge, which involved rowing, swimming, cycling and running. Footage of the latter challenge, which took place between the Aquatics Centre in London and Plymouth, was featured in a BBC One documentary called Tom Daley's Hell of a Homecoming, which was broadcast on 14 March 2022.

The main Red Nose Day programming was split into three sections with the three-hour comedy special and The Great Comic Relief Prizeathon appearing on BBC One before and after the news, whilst Comic Relief at the Movies took a 10pm slot on BBC Two.

The 2022 Comic Relief show featured parodies of The Repair Shop (with Dawn French, Jennifer Saunders and Dame Judi Dench) as well as various popstars in David Walliams and Matt Lucas' Rock Profile sketches, whilst Tim Vine and Kiri Pritchard-McLean took part in a One Man and His Dog competition. The late-night programme The Great Comic Relief Prizeathon was presented by Vernon Kay and AJ Odudu, with an hour-long Best Bits compilation being transmitted a couple of days after the event.

=== 2023 event ===
The 2023 event was held on the same day as St. Patrick's Day which is 17 March 2023. Lenny Henry did not appear as the telethon's main presenter due to commitments with another project. Instead, the role was filled by David Tennant. An open sketch saw Henry regenerating into Tennant as a parody of Doctor Who. £34 million was raised from donations.

=== 2024 event ===
The 2024 event was held on 15 March 2024. This was the last telethon for Lenny Henry, the fundraiser's founder after 39 years of being the presenter of the telethon. As part of the tributes to Henry, co-host David Tennant, who also hosted the previous year's telethon, thanked Henry for "an amazing tour of duty". The event raised £38 million from donations.

=== 2025 event ===
The 2025 event was held on 21 March 2025. It was the first event since Henry's departure in 2024. Davina McCall, AJ Odudu, and Joel Dommett returned to present after hosting last year, Alesha Dixon also returned 3 years after her previous appearance in 2022, and Jonathan Ross returned after previously hosting in 2017. Alongside them, Alison Hammond, Tom Allen, and Rylan Clark hosted for the very first time.

As part of Comic Reliefs 40th anniversary, 40 Years of Funny was broadcast. Emma Willis and Asim Chaudhry presented a special programme celebrating the show’s 40 year anniversary.

As of 22 March 2025, £34,022,590 had been raised.

=== 2026 event ===
The 2026 event was held on 20 March 2026. Davina McCall hosted again, this time alongside Katherine Ryan, Nick Mohammed, Joel Dommett and Catherine Tate, and the show featured guests including Ayame, Sarel, Specs Gonzalez, Victor Kunda, Alison Hammond, Dermot O'Leary, Iain Stirling, Vicky Pattison, Alison Steadman, Amanda Holden, Amanda Barrie, Amanda Collier and Greg James.

As of 20 March 2026, £30,004,040 had been raised.

== Ratings ==
Year	Broadcast	BBC Television			
Year	Broadcast	Total viewers (millions)		Weekly rank	
Year	Broadcast	BBC One	BBC Two	BBC One	BBC Two
1988	5 February	16.40	—N/a	—N/a	—N/a
1989	10 March	—N/a	—N/a	—N/a	—N/a
1991	15 March	—N/a	—N/a	—N/a	—N/a
1993	12 March	—N/a	—N/a	—N/a	—N/a
1995	17 March	—N/a	—N/a	—N/a	—N/a
1997	14 March	—N/a	—N/a	—N/a	—N/a
1999	12 March	6.83	3.13	20	13
2001	16 March	8.51	5.47	8	2
2003	14 March	11.74	6.01	4	1
2005	11 March	10.94	4.72	4	1
2007	16 March	9.73	6.40	2	1
2009	13 March	9.84	7.09	1	1
2011	18 March	10.26	7.53	1	1
2013	15 March	10.28	4.79	1	1
2015	13 March	8.48	4.67	1	1
2017	24 March	6.30	2.21	6	7
2019	15 March	5.85	2.99	3	2
2021	19 March	4.59	—N/a	13	—N/a
2022	18 March	3.53	1.37	—N/a	13
2023	17 March	3.02	—N/a	39	—N/a
2024	15 March	3.83	TBA	TBA	TBA
2025	21 March	TBA	TBA	TBA	TBA
2026	20 March	TBA	TBA	TBA	TBA
Source: BARB

== Fundraising ==
Year	Amount	Real value in 2025 £
1988	£15,000,000	£41,800,000
1989	£26,900,000	£71,200,000
1991	£20,000,000	£46,000,000
1993	£18,000,000	£38,700,000
1995	£22,000,000	£45,200,000
1997	£27,000,000	£53,200,000
1999	£35,000,000	£67,000,000
2001	£55,000,000	£103,300,000
2003	£61,600,000	£112,700,000
2005	£65,000,000	£114,900,000
2007	£67,700,000	£114,200,000
2009	£82,300,000	£131,300,000
2011	£108,436,277	£160,350,000
2013	£100,331,808	£140,670,000
2015	£99,418,831	£137,330,000
2017	£82,154,943	£109,790,000
2019	£70,657,000	£90,520,000
2021	£61,544,783	£76,210,000
2022	£41,897,983	£47,560,000
2023	£31,952,141	£33,390,000
2024	£40,055,914	£39,560,000
2025	£34,022,590	£33,050,000
2026	£30,004,040	£28,450,000
Total	£1,165,976,310	£1,761,890,000
Source: Past Red Nose Days

== Merchandise ==
Various items of merchandise have been sold to promote and raise money for Comic Relief. In 1991, The Totally Stonking, Surprisingly Educational And Utterly Mindboggling Comic Relief Comic was published by Fleetway. Conceived, plotted and edited by Neil Gaiman, Richard Curtis, Grant Morrison and Peter K. Hogan, it featured contributions from a vast array of British comics talent, including Jamie Delano, Garth Ennis, Dave Gibbons, Mark Millar, Simon Bisley, Mark Buckingham, Steve Dillon, D'Israeli, Jamie Hewlett and Bryan Talbot. (Alan Moore, arguably Britain's most famous comics writer, was not credited as working on the book having sworn never to work for Fleetway again, but was said to have worked with partner Melinda Gebbie on her pages.) The comic was unique in that it featured appearances by characters from across the spectrum of comics publishers, including Marvel and DC superheroes, Beano, Dandy, Eagle and Viz characters, Doctor Who, the Teenage Mutant Ninja Turtles, in addition to a cavalcade of British comedy figures (both real and fictional). These were all linked by the twin framing narratives of the Comic Relief night itself, and the tale of "Britain's meanest man" Sir Edmund Blackadder being persuaded to donate money to the event. The comic "sold out in minutes", raising more than £40,000 for the charity, and is now a highly prized collector's item. Comic Relief have also sold Fairtrade Cotton Socks from a number of vendors. This is mainly for their Sport Relief charity.

In 1993 a computer platform game was released, called Sleepwalker. The game featured voice overs from Lenny Henry and Harry Enfield, and several other references to Comic Relief and tomatoes; the theme for the 1993 campaign.

In 2001 J. K. Rowling wrote two books for Comic Relief based on her famous Harry Potter series, entitled Fantastic Beasts and Where to Find Them and Quidditch Through the Ages. The Fantastic Beasts book, would ultimately lead to the mid-late 2010s series of films of the same name as part of the expanded "Potterverse".

In 2007, Walkers complemented the usual merchandise by adding their own take on the red nose, promoting red ears instead. The large ears, dubbed 'Walk-ears', are based on a very old joke involving the actual ears of ex-footballer Gary Lineker, who has fronted their ad campaign since the early 1990s. Walkers previously promoted the charity in 2005, making four limited edition unusual crisp flavours.

The 2007 game for Red Nose Day, "Let It Flow", could be played online. This game was developed by Matmi, worldwide viral marketeers, and set in the African wilderness. Mischievous hyenas had messed up the water irrigation system, which fed the crops. You had to help re-arrange the pipes to let the water flow to the crops to keep them alive. Once the pipes were arranged, you needed to operate the elephant's trunk to pump the water through the water pipes.

For the 2007 campaign Andrex, known for their ad campaign fronted by a Labrador puppy, gave away toy puppies with red noses.

As a Supporting Partner Jackpotjoy has launched two Red Nose Day Games for Red Nose Day 2011.

=== Red nose ===
The most prominent symbol of Comic Relief is a "red nose", which is given in various supermarkets and charity shops such as Oxfam in exchange for a donation to the charity and to make others laugh. People are encouraged to wear the noses on Red Nose Day to help raise awareness of the charity. The design of the nose has been changed each year, beginning with a fairly plain one, which later grew arms, turned into a tomato and even changed colour. This regular re-design was in part to stop people from re-using previous years designs, and having to buy the latest version, as for example some people may re-use the same Poppy, repeatedly, rather than buying a new one each year. In 2007, the red nose was made of foam; this was to facilitate the "growing" of the nose (by rolling it in the user's hands) to keep in line with that year's tagline, The Big One (see the table below). Larger noses are also available and are designed to be attached to the fronts of cars, buildings and, in 2009, a 6-metre (20-foot) diameter inflatable nose was attached to the DFDS Seaways cruiseferry King of Scandinavia. However, the nose's material used for buildings was classed as a fire hazard and was banned from the Comic Relief Does Fame Academy shows.

==== Chronology of noses ====
As of 2019, Comic Relief has sold 50 different red noses over 19 Red Nose Days. In 1988, It started with one nose. Two noses were available for the 1995 event. Three noses per event were available from 2009 to 2013. In 2015, nine noses were released, and in 2017, there were 10 different noses available—for both these years, this included a rare collector's nose. For 2019, 11 different noses were available to buy, including "rare" and "ultra-rare" noses. Ten different plastic-free noses were available for Red Nose Day 2021. In 2022, There were 8 noses. In 2023, It went back to only one. In 2024, there were four plastic noses, including the golden "rare" nose. In 2025, 6 noses were made to celebrate the 40th anniversary of Red Nose Day. 4 noses from past Comic Relief campaigns (1988, 1991, 2009 and 2013) to celebrate 4 decades of Comic Relief, alongside a cupcake nose exclusive to the collector’s pack, and a rare ruby red nose. All noses also returned to their foam design for the first time since 2019. In 2026, 6 nose designs were made. The classic red nose returned, alongside 5 illustration noses made by Mr Doodle. However, Comic Relief introduced the “Design-Yer Noses”, unlimited red noses with a blank canvas in the front (made by drawing paper and wood) whilst maintaining the biofoam used in 2025 for attachments. This allows the British public to make their own Red Nose Day designs, technically making it the campaign with the largest number of Red Noses.

Year	Name	Description	Material
1988	The Red Nose	Plain red nose with four holes	Plastic
1989	My Nose	Had an embossed smiling face with spiked hair logo, known as 'Harry'.	Scented plastic
1991	The Stonker	Had hands protruding from each side and the embossed face logo.	Plastic
1993	Tomato Nose	Red nose with embossed face and a green tomato stalk.	Plastic
1995	The Heat Sensitive Nose	The nose came in two versions, which turned either yellow or pink when heated. The words 'MY NOSE' were embossed on it.	Heat sensitive plastic
1997	Shaggy Nose	A clear plastic nose covered in shaggy red fur	Plastic, fur
1999	The Big Red Hooter	Faceless with gold glitter, and when squeezed it 'hooted'. The first nose to be sold in a small cardboard box.	Plastic with glitter
2001	Whoopee Nose	Red head with inflated cheeks, when squeezed the tongue inflated.	Plastic with rubber tongue
2003	Hairy Nose	Had gooey eyes that squeezed out and a tuft of red hairs. It came with gel for the hair. When worn upside down, the hair can resemble a moustache.	Plastic with synthetic hair
2005	Big Hair & Beyond	Had a smiley face and colourful elastic hair. It came with red and yellow face paint and stickers for the nose. The last nose to be plastic until 2022.	Plastic with elastic hair
2007	The Big One	Faceless and more comfortable, came with stickers to decorate the nose with, and a Chocpix chocolate. The last nose to be sold in a small cardboard box until 2019. £40,236,142 was raised.	Foam with stickers
2009	This One, That One, The Other One	Three noses were available. "This One" had a big smile with mouth open. "That One" had glasses and a smile with the teeth closed. "The Other One" had a shocked look. All three came with six stickers depicting each of the noses, the RND 2009 logo and tag-line "Do something funny for money". Also included were a "Hello, my nose is:" name tag sticker and a small booklet of nose-related jokes. £59,187,065 was raised.	Foam with stickers
2011	Monster Noses	There were three different 'monster noses' for RND 2011. "Honkus" had a furry face, a large mouth with sharp teeth and small eyes near the top of the head. "Chucklechomp" had small round spectacles and a large mouth. "Captain Conk" was roughly based on a pirate, with a Jolly Roger bandana and an eyepatch. Each nose came with a circular leaflet, which contained monster related jokes and pictures of the three monster noses. An augmented reality version of the nose was created as part of the Red Nose Day website. Via a webcam the user's head was converted into a giant red nose, which could then be recorded as a short movie and posted to Facebook or YouTube.	Foam
2013	The Nose With Toes	For the third year running, three noses were available and they were dinosaur-themed. "Dinomite" had a spiky hairdo and a large pointy-toothed growl with small eyes near the top of the head. "T-Spex" had a big nose and black thick-rimmed glasses. "Triceytops" was based upon a Triceratops with a large smile and a spiked 'mane'. Their slogan was 'Meet the diNOSEaurs!' These were also the first noses to include feet in their designs.	Foam
2015	Nose in a Bag	For the first time, nine nose designs had been created, each placed in a "mystery bag" packaging, meaning that people would get one of the nose designs at random rather than being able to choose. The Red Noses were: Supernose – A superhero nose.; Nosebot – A nose as a robot, created by Snotty Professor.; Snotty Professor – A professor-like nose and creator of Nosebot and the Golden Noses.; Stripey – A criminal nose with a masked identity.; Astrosnort – A nose resembling an astronaut.; Snorbit – An alien-like nose.; Snout Dracula – A parody of Count Dracula.; Snortel – A nose with a snorkel.; Karate Konk – A nose disguised in karate outfit.; Comic Relief hid 12 golden versions of these noses in stores around the country, offering winners a "Golden Nose Experience".	Foam
2017	The Red Noses	The nature of the red noses was exactly the same as for 2015, but with different characters. Noses were once again sold in the bags. Ten noses were available, including one rare nose. £82,154,943 was raised.: Nose-it-all: A nose in the shape of an all-knowing owl.; Norse Nose: A nose that resembles a Viking.; Snootankhamun: Nose based on a mummy, wrapped in bandages. Alongside Snuffles and Dr. Nose (see below), one of the first female nose characters.; Snuffles: A nose based on a dragon.; Sneezecake: a nose based on a chef, wearing chef's clothing.; DJ Boogie: A nose with star shaped glasses and headphones.; Sniffer: a nose based on a dog, with dog ears.; Dr. Nose: a nose doctor with a stethoscope.; The Snorcerer: Nose with magician hat.; Frankinose: rare silver nose based on Frankenstein's monster. Only 1 in every 900 bags has this character.	Foam
2019	The Red Noses	This year's noses were once again made from the same material, but introduced different characters. There were 9 regular, 1 rare (1 in 840) and 1 ultra-rare (1 in 8400). Inside the package of each nose was a part of a castle building, and the red noses had their own app, titled "Red Nose", which involved augmented reality. The noses were unveiled on 19 December 2018. The regular noses were: Wolfnose: A werewolf.; Schnoz III: A knight.; Abominable Snoseman: A yeti.; Honkus Ponkus: A magician.; The Gnose: A gnome.; Hairy Nostroll: A troll.; Snufflekins: A cat.; Nosediva: A mermaid. Along with Conk Jester, it has a plush toy./; Conk Jester: A jester. Along with Nosediva, it has a plush toy./; Hoppy Hooter: A green frog. (1/840 chance); Transforminos: A senior citizen. (1/8400 chance)	Foam
2021	The Plant-Based Nose	On October 5, 2020, Comic Relief unveiled its first ever plant-based, plastic-free red nose for Red Nose Day 2021, created in response to concerns over the environmental damage of plastic waste. There were 10 noses, all with environmental themes. They were made of bagasse, a natural product of sugarcane, chosen for its "widely celebrated sustainable qualities". The 10 noses all had different names and designs based on nature. All came with their own box: Chief: A nose with a green leaf. Along with Fox and Tommy, it has a plush toy.; Robin.; Snail: It has a purple shell.; Fox: Along with Chief and Tommy, it has a plush toy.; Badger.; Caterpillar.; Lady B: A ladybird.; Daisy.; Tommy: A tomato: Along with Chief and Fox, it has a plush toy.; "Ultra rare" Gold Tommy: A reddening tomato.	Bagasse
2022	The Safari Nose	For the second time Comic Relief used bagasse for its red noses. The 8 noses all had different names and designs based on African animals: Dot: A cheetah.; Dash: A sloth.; Chip: A hippo.; Flo: A flamingo; Rocco: A crocodile.; Sky: A giraffe.; Lucky: A lion.; Cam: A rare rainbow-coloured chameleon. This character was also sold as a plush toy.	Bagasse
2023	Magically transforming Red Nose	Designed by ex-Apple product designer Sir Jony Ive, the magically transforming Red Nose starts as a tiny, flat crescent and springs into a beautiful honeycomb-paper sphere.	Paper, bagasse, polylactic acid (PLA) and rubber
2024	The Red Noses	2024's noses were made from 70% bagasse and 30% wood pulp. For 2024, there were three characters to collect, as well as the Rare Blue and Golden Noses, and were named: McChortles: A super-smiley nose.; Gigglesworth: A nose with uncontrollable laughter.; Smirklethorpe: A smiling, bespectacled nose.; The Golden Hooter: A faceless, golden-coloured "rare" nose.; Surprise Blue Nose: A female blue nose with controllable laughter, like the opposite of Gigglesworth.	Bagasse, wood pulp
2025	Best of the Best	To mark 40 years of Comic Relief, the charity recreated four noses from past Red Nose Days of each decade - the original nose from 1988, the "Stonker" nose with hands from 1991, the "That One" smiley nose from 2009 and the Triceytops dinosaur nose from 2013. There was also a rare (1-in-125 chance) ruby nose and a birthday nose resembling a cupcake with a candle (only available as part of a £12 multipack). All noses were made from a new material - biofoam (derived from soy).	Biofoam

==== Chronology of car noses ====
A selection of Red Nose Day "car noses" have been produced over the years, to show support for the charity while out on the road. They have traditionally been a curved nose that attaches to the car's radiator grille. In 2009, this was replaced with a magnetic design owing to safety concerns. The original grill-attachable design returned for 2011, for the first time since 1999.

Year	Name	Description
1989	The Red Nose	A curved, dome-like plastic red nose which attached to the car's radiator grille at the front.
1991	The Hands Nose	A red plastic nose with hands, which attached to the car's radiator grille at the front.
1993	The Tomato Nose	A red plastic nose with a green tomato stalk, which attached to the car's radiator grille at the front with cable ties.
1997	The Aerial Nose	A small red plastic nose that attached to the car's aerial. This nose was sold in Texaco fuel stations.
1999	The Hands Nose	Another red plastic nose with hands and '1999' in golden adhesive numbers, which attached to the car's radiator grille at the front with cable ties.
2001	The Big Sticky Car Nose	A small plastic nose with wings, synonymous to The Spirit of Ecstasy hood ornament on Rolls-Royce cars, for attaching to the car's bonnet with a suction cup on the base. The Big Sticky Nose featured a face designed by Aardman animators, the creators of Wallace and Gromit.
2003	The Hairy Air Freshener Nose	A small plastic nose with a smiley face and red tuft of hair, attached to the driver's rear-view mirror.
2005	The Air Freshener Nose	A small plastic nose with a smiley face and colourful koosh-like elastic hair, for attaching to the driver's rear-view mirror.
2007	Big Smelly Nose Balls	Two furry air freshener noses with black spectacles, which dangled from the driver's rear-view mirror, synonymous with furry dice from the 1950s.
2009	The Magnetic Nose	A thin and flat magnetic nose, with a grinning face, which attached magnetically to the car's bonnet.
2011	The Monster Nose	A return to the curved plastic nose, featuring a monster face, which attached to the car's radiator grille at the front with cable ties.
2013	The diNOSEsaur Air Freshener	A return to the air freshener for cars. The flat design featured the three dinosaur red noses, T-Spex, Triceytops and Dinomite, with the tag line 'It's extinction time for bad odours'.
2015	The Mystery Bag Air Freshener	A flat design with the 9 noses from the mystery bags.

2014 saw the new release of 2 Flip Flap noses, the Poppy and England flag red nose designs and the first paper noses for cars and the 1st year for 2 car noses.

== Charity singles ==
In April 1986, the first Comic Relief charity record was released. It featured Cliff Richard and the cast of The Young Ones in a rendition of Richard's late 50s hit "Living Doll".

Some of the money raised from the sale of each single is donated to Comic Relief. Normally, a song is released just before the official Red Nose Day. There have been exceptions, such as "(I Want To Be) Elected", which was released to coincide with the 1992 UK general election. Before the single released in 1995, Comic Relief records were all more-or-less comedy releases, mostly involving an actual band or singer teamed up with a comedy group. From 1995 on, they have been generally more serious, although the promo videos still feature comical moments.

2003 saw a return to the format of old. From 2005 to 2011, two Comic Relief singles were released each Red Nose Day, a song by a mainstream artist and also a comedy song.

In 1991, a music video was created called "Helping Hands", which included numerous children's television puppet personalities, including characters from The House of Gristle, Fraggle Rock, Rainbow, Roland Rat, Thunderbirds, Round the Bend!, Bill & Ben, The Gophers, Spitting Image, Jim Henson's Tale of the Bunny Picnic and more. In 1993 a follow-up single happened, this time featuring the biggest stars of children's television at the time called "You Can Be a Hero". Neither song was ever released.

The biggest-selling Comic Relief single is Tony Christie and Peter Kay's "Is This the Way to Amarillo", with 1.28 million copies sold. Westlife's 2001 cover of Billy Joel's "Uptown Girl" is the second biggest-seller, followed by 1986's "Living Doll" and the Spice Girls' 1997 double-A side single "Mama"/"Who Do You Think You Are?", with Boyzone's 1999 cover of "When the Going Gets Tough, The Tough Get Going" rounding up the top five.

Year	Title(s)	Respective artist(s)	Respective highest chart position(s) reached
1985	Not applicable		
1986	"Living Doll"	Cliff Richard and The Young Ones featuring Hank Marvin^{1}	No. 1
1987	"Rockin' Around the Christmas Tree"	Mel & Kim (Mel Smith and Kim Wilde)	No. 3
1988	Not applicable		
1989	"Help!"	Bananarama and Lananeeneenoonoo (French and Saunders with Kathy Burke)	No. 3
1991	"The Stonk"	Hale & Pace and the Stonkers (Brian May, David Gilmour, Tony Iommi, Cozy Powell, Roger Taylor and Rowan Atkinson)	No. 1
1991	"The Smile Song"^{2}	Victoria Wood	No. 1
1992	"(I Want to Be) Elected"	Mr. Bean and Smear Campaign featuring Bruce Dickinson (Rowan Atkinson, Angus Deayton, Skin)	No. 9
1993	"Stick It Out"	Right Said Fred and Friends (Hugh Laurie, Peter Cook, Alan Freeman, Jools Holland, Steve Coogan, Clive Anderson, Pauline Quirke, Linda Robson, Basil Brush and Bernard Cribbins)	No. 4
1994	"Absolutely Fabulous"	Absolutely Fabulous (Pet Shop Boys, Jennifer Saunders, Joanna Lumley)	No. 6
1995	"Love Can Build a Bridge"	Cher, Chrissie Hynde, Neneh Cherry and Eric Clapton	No. 1
1997	"Mama" / "Who Do You Think You Are?"^{3}	Spice Girls^{4}	No. 1
1999	"When the Going Gets Tough"	Boyzone^{4}	No. 1
2001	"Uptown Girl"	Westlife	No. 1
2003	"Spirit in the Sky"	Gareth Gates and the Kumars	No. 1
2005	"All About You" / "You've Got a Friend"	McFly	No. 1
2005	"Is This the Way to Amarillo"^{5}	Tony Christie & Peter Kay	No. 1
2007	"Walk This Way"	Sugababes vs. Girls Aloud	No. 1
2007	"I'm Gonna Be (500 Miles)"^{6}	The Proclaimers & Brian Potter & Andy Pipkin^{6}	No. 1
2009	"Just Can't Get Enough"	The Saturdays	No. 2
2009	"(Barry) Islands in the Stream"	Vanessa Jenkins and Bryn West, featuring Tom Jones and Robin Gibb^{7}	No. 1
2009	"The Haggis"	Clax	DNC
2011	"Gold Forever"^{8}	The Wanted	No. 3
2011	"I Know Him So Well"	Susan Boyle & Peter Kay (as Geraldine McQueen)	No.11
2013	"One Way or Another (Teenage Kicks)"	One Direction	No. 1
2015	"Lay Me Down"^{9}	Sam Smith featuring John Legend	No. 1
2017	"What Do I Know?"	Ed Sheeran & Kurupt FM	No. 9
2019–2023	Not applicable		
2024	"Enjoy Yourself"	Paloma Faith	DNC
2025	"Somewhere Only We Know"	Rock Choir, Caroline Redman Lusher & The Rock Choir Vocal Group	DNC
2026–present	Not applicable		

Notes

- ^1 Even though "Living Doll" is a song featuring the cast of The Young Ones, this does not include Alexei Sayle
- ^2 This was a double-A side single, even though the Official Charts Company only credit one side with the hit
- ^3 "Who Do You Think You Are" is the Comic Relief side
- ^4 On this release, comedians only appear in the video
- ^5 "Is This the Way to Amarillo", though released expressly with the intent of proceeds going to Comic Relief, was not an official Comic Relief single. The song was originally performed by Peter Kay (lip-synching to the voice Tony Christie) during the evening, and was later released as a single. It was No. 1 in the UK charts for seven weeks, and in its first week, it outsold the rest of the Top 20 combined.
- ^6 In 2007, a version of The Proclaimers' song "500 Miles", released on 19 March, featured Peter Kay and Matt Lucas as their respective wheelchair-using characters Brian Potter and Andy Pipkin. Before its official release, the song reached No. 3 based on downloads alone. The single itself reached No. 1 on 25 March, knocking official Comic Relief single "Walk This Way" off the top spot.
- ^7 In 2009, the comedy release took prominence over the single release by a mainstream recording artist. Gavin & Stacey's Ruth Jones and Rob Brydon covered "Islands in The Stream" for the event, with this being released on the week of Comic Relief. The Saturdays had released their record a week earlier.
- ^8 "Gold Forever" is the lead single from The Wanted's second studio album, Battleground. It is also a promo single on their 2012 American debut, The Wanted EP.
- ^9 This was listed as a separate hit with the original version of "Lay Me Down" peaking at number 15.

In addition, the first Red Nose Day schools' song ("Make Someone Happy") was published in 2007. A CD of the song, together with backing tracks and fundraising ideas, was sent free of charge to all primary schools in the UK – during February – by the education music publisher 'Out of the Ark Music'. Schools would be free to use the song in assemblies, singathons, or other fundraising activities. A second Red Nose Day Song has been released for every school in the UK, to use free of charge. It can be downloaded from the Red Nose Day 09 website, or watched on YouTube, and a copy has been sent to every primary school in the UK. It was again published by 'Out of the Ark' music, and contained a more upbeat melody than the version released in 2007. It was recorded at Hook Studios, Hook, Surrey, by the Out of the Ark Choir, which is completely made up of children. The children in the video wear Stella McCartney's special edition Comic Relief T-shirts, and was filmed in black and white so that only the red stood out.

== Criticism ==
There has been some concern about the lack of gender equality in the causes supported by Comic Relief, with much funding going to politicised women's charities or charities focusing on women. Writing in The Spectator, Ross Clark raised the question, 'Why do all these women's charities...feel the need to disguise their fundraising in the prat-fest that is Comic Relief, rather than appealing directly to the public?' He added, 'Are they worried that if the British public realised where their money was going, they would be less inclined to be so generous?'

The British Stammering Association criticised comedian Lenny Henry over his opening sketch for the 2011 telethon, during which he spoofed the film The King's Speech and grew impatient with Colin Firth in his portrayal of King George VI as he stammered over his speech. The Sun reported that the British Stammering Association had branded the sketch as 'a gross and disgusting gleefulness at pointing out someone else's misfortune'.

In December 2013, an edition of the BBC One series Panorama pointed out that between 2007 and 2009, millions of pounds donated to Comic Relief had been invested in funds, which appeared "to contradict several of its core aims", with shares in tobacco, alcohol and arms firms.

The 2017 event was strongly criticised by viewers for various technical issues, glitches and having two adult-orientated skits shown before the 9 pm watershed, one where Vic Reeves showed a fake penis to Good Morning Britain presenter Susanna Reid, and another featuring a scene in which presenter Graham Norton asks model Cara Delevingne why she had sex on a plane. The event was also criticised for two pre-watershed instances of profanity, one involving a Mrs. Brown's Boys skit where the titular character does a V sign (a gesture that is deemed profane in the United Kingdom), and another involving Russell Brand after a technical blunder caused him to swear and say "Fuck" after being cut off. In total 338 complaints were made to Ofcom, however the regulator chose not to investigate because the comedy sketches "were inexplicit and consistent with the live, unpredictable format of this established charity programme", whilst recognising that some "were not to everyone's taste".

In 2017, a video featuring Ed Sheeran meeting and rescuing a child in Liberia for Comic Relief was criticised as 'poverty porn' and was given the 'Rusty Radiator' award for the 'most offensive and stereotypical fundraising video of the year'.

Writing in The Guardian in 2017, Labour MP David Lammy argued that Comic Relief perpetuated problematic stereotypes of Africa, and that they had a responsibility to use its powerful position to move the debate on in a more constructive way by establishing an image of African people as equals.

In 2018, in response to Lammy's comments and the backlash to Sheeran's video, Comic Relief announced they would take steps towards change by halting their use of celebrities for appeals.

However, in February 2019, Lammy also criticised Stacey Dooley for posting on social media about her trip to Uganda for Comic Relief, saying that 'the world does not need any more white saviours', and that she was perpetuating 'tired and unhelpful stereotypes' about Africa. The pressure group 'No White Saviours' argued that Comic Relief had pledged to make changes to their celebrity campaigns in the past, and now needed to put them into practice.

The remarks by Lammy were believed to have damaged coverage of Red Nose Day; viewership dropped and the donations received for the broadcast in March 2019 fell by £8 million and the money raised that year was the lowest since 2007. In 2020, as a result of Lammy's intervention, Comic Relief announced that it would no longer send celebrities to Africa nor portray Africa with images of starving people or critically ill children. Instead, they would be using local film makers to provide a more "authentic" perspective and give agency back to African people.

== Similar events outside the United Kingdom ==
- United States: Inspired by the British charity, a United States Comic Relief charity was founded in 1986 by Bob Zmuda. Comic Relief was an irregularly held event, televised on Home Box Office (HBO), which has raised and distributed nearly US$50 million towards providing health care services to homeless people throughout the United States. Comedians Robin Williams, Billy Crystal and Whoopi Goldberg were hosts of the event. The 1989 HBO Comic Relief show debuted the song "Mr. President", written by Joe Sterling, Ray Reach and Mike Loveless. The song was sung by Al Jarreau and Natalie Cole. On 18 November 2006, the event was revived as a fundraiser for those affected by Hurricane Katrina, and was simulcast on TBS. Richard Curtis also created the Idol Gives Back special for American Idol, which follows the same basic premise as Comic Relief, with specially filmed shorts, performances and footage of the stars of the show visiting impoverished countries. In 2015, Red Nose Day was formally brought to the United States under the auspices of Comic Relief, Inc., an organisation unrelated to the defunct Comic Relief USA. The 2015 Red Nose Day Special aired on NBC on 21 May 2015 and was hosted by David Duchovny, Seth Meyers and Jane Krakowski, raising $23 million. The 2016 NBC special aired on 26 May with Craig Ferguson as the host. Sponsored by Walgreens, Red Nose Day was an annual event though to 2022.
- Australia: In 1988, the Red Nose Day concept was adopted by the SIDS and Kids organisation to help raise funds for research into sudden infant death syndrome. Since then, Red Nose Day in Australia is held annually on the last Friday of June. An Australian version of Comic Relief, Comic Relief Australia, has also been set up. Following a campaign encouraging people to buy articles such as red wristbands, the first telethon-style event was held on 6 November 2005 on the Seven Network. It followed the established format, with comedy interspersed with examples of the sorts of charities to benefit. According to its website, this raised more than A$800,000. Another telethon was broadcast on 27 November 2006 on Seven Network. The 2006 Comic Relief Show was held under the title '50 Years of Laughs' celebrating 50 years of television in Australia. It was hosted by Colin Lane, and featured presenters such as Amanda Keller, Mikey Robins, Ugly Dave Gray and Derryn Hinch interviewing Kylie Mole.
- Germany: The German TV station Pro 7 initiated a similar event in 2003. By selling red noses, money is collected for the charity foundations PowerChild, Deutsche Kinder- und Jugendstiftung (lit., German Child and Youth Foundation), and Comic Relief. The event is called 'Red Nose Day', and took place annually in March or April from 2003 to 2006. However, ratings and the collected donations fell far short of expectations in 2006, resulting in no main show being produced in 2007 and 2008. In 2003, Nena (who is famous for her hit song 99 Red Balloons) released an updated version of her song Wunder Gescheh'n (Miracles Happen) for the charity. In 2010, the Red Nose Day returned on Pro7. It took place on 25 November.
- Russia: A similar charity campaign, entitled "Red Nose, Kind Heart", was launched in Russia on 1 April 2007. The main goal of the drive, held between 1 April and 19 May 2007 by the Liniya Zhizni (Life Line) foundation, is raising money to help children afflicted with serious diseases (such as heart diseases).
- Finland: In 2002, the Finnish national broadcaster YLE started an annual charity event, which initially went under the title "Ylen hyvä". In 2007, the event adopted the name "Nenäpäivä" (Nose day), and the use of red noses to more closely follow the example of the British event.
- Iceland: Dagur rauða nefsins (Red Nose Day) has been held in support of UNICEF since 2006. It has featured the sale of red noses to raise funds and has enjoyed support and publicity from many local celebrities and televised events on the national broadcaster, RÚV.
- Belgium: "Rodeneuzendag" (Red Nose Day) was held in Belgium for the first time in 2015 to raise money for children with psychiatric problems, and aired on VTM.
- Ireland: RTÉ Does Comic Relief was launched in June 2020, to raise funds for charities and local community initiatives within Ireland. The event took place to raise funds that were lost during the COVID-19 pandemic with all proceeds going to The Community Foundation for Ireland who will distribute the funds raised to more than 4,000 non-profit organisations at a national, regional, and local level throughout Ireland. The event was broadcast live on RTÉ One and the RTÉ Player for more than 4 hours on Friday 26 June 2020 raising millions of euro for local charities with appearances by Paul Mescal, Aisling Bea, Hozier, Roy Keane, Westlife, Samantha Mumba, Amy Huberman and a host of other Irish and international celebrities, comedians, actors, and musicians. The event was hosted by Deirdre O'Kane, Nicky Byrne, Baz Ashmawy, Jennifer Zamparelli, and Eoghan McDermott. During the live event the Government of Ireland issued a statement stating it would match all proceeds donated by doubling the amount and a number of Irish and international companies also donated large sums of money to the fund.

== See also ==
- Band Aid (band)
- ChildLine
- The Secret Policeman's Ball
- Serious Request
- Sport Aid
- USA for Africa
- WOŚP
