= Turn It Off =

Turn It Off may refer to:

- "Turn It Off", a 2011 song by Elder McKinley from the musical The Book of Mormon
- "Turn It Off", a 2009 song by Paramore from the album Brand New Eyes
- "Turn It Off", a 2017 song by Why Don't We
- "Turn It Off", a 2011 song by the Wanted from the album Battleground
