= Warzone (song) =

Single by The Wanted

from the album Battleground
- Released: 26 December 2011
- Recorded: 2011
- Genre: Electropop
- Length: 3:38
- Label: Island
- Songwriters: Jack McManus; Harry Sommerdahl; Max George; Nathan Sykes
- Producer: Harry Sommerdahl

The Wanted singles chronology
"Lightning" (2011)	"Warzone" (2011)	"Chasing the Sun" (2012)

Music video
- "Warzone" on YouTube

"Warzone" is a song by British-Irish boy band the Wanted, released as the fourth and final single from their second studio album, Battleground (2011). It is also featured on the special edition of their self-titled EP. It was released on 26 December 2011. The electropop ballad contains elements of dubstep, and was written by band members Nathan Sykes and Max George, alongside Jack McManus and producer Harry Sommerdahl.

"Warzone" received positive reviews from music critics, who felt the song was one of the highlights of the album. "Warzone" has peaked at number 21 on the UK Singles Chart, becoming their first single to miss the UK top 20.

The music video premiered on 10 November 2011.

== Critical reception ==
"Warzone" has received positive reviews from critics. Jon O'Brien of AllMusic referred to "Warzone" as one of the songs that proves "that the Wanted are still a cut above your average boy band", describing the song as "a subtle attempt at dubstep that fuses somber piano chords and an epic soft rock chorus with distant wobble basslines and spacious beats". David Griffiths of 4Music called the song the band's "most mature effort to date" writing, "Featuring a haunting piano riff, emotional vocals and a truly epic chorus, it's easily the best thing they've ever recorded.". Lewis Corner of Digital Spy quoted, "Try to erase a memory with a flame, And hope I never see you again," Jay declares over a lilting piano and rumbling bass that you'd expect from a Jamie Cullum vs. Nero play-off. Thankfully, the curious combo works beautifully beneath their angst-driven lyrics of betrayal and heartbreak, striking a fine balance between boyband balladry and oh-so-trendy dub beats. With Jay now on board with their current sound, we'd suggest he makes sure his heartbroken bandmates are holding up at this difficult time."

== Music video ==
The music video for "Warzone" was shot on location in Brooklyn, New York City by Director X. The video was subsequently released to YouTube on 10 November 2011. The video focuses on the intimate relationships between the five members of the group and their girlfriends. However, each member, one by one, discovers that his girlfriend is cheating on him with another man, played by model Broderick Hunter. The video incorporates shots of the band in a burning scrapyard, outside and inside an apartment building, and walking the streets of New York. An alternative version of the video featuring alternate scenes was released to music channels on 14 December 2011. This version of the video also accompanies the download package.

== Track listing ==
- Digital download
1. "Warzone" – 3:38
2. "Warzone" (Basto! Remix) – 5:40
3. "Warzone" (Green Fusion Remix) – 2:58
4. "Animal" (Live Tour Performance) – 4:22

== Charts ==
Chart (2011–2012)	Peak position
Ireland (IRMA)	27
Scotland Singles (Official Charts)	18
UK Singles (Official Charts)	21
UK Airplay (Music Week)	29

== Release history ==
Region	Date	Format	Label
Ireland	Digital download	23 December 2011	Global Talent; Universal Island
United Kingdom	Digital download	26 December 2011	Global Talent; Universal Island
