= Unwanted =

Unwanted, The Unwanted or The Unwanteds may refer to:

- Unwanted (album), a 2022 album by the band Pale Waves
- Unwanted (film), 2017 Kosovan film by Edon Rizvanolli
- "Unwanted", a 2002 song by Avril Lavigne on the Let Go album
- The Unwanted (1924 film), British film by Walter Summers
- The Unwanted (1951 film) (Spanish: La indeseable), Argentine film by Mario Soffici
- The Unwanted, 2014 American film by Bret Wood
- The Unwanteds, a fantasy book series by Lisa McMann
  - The Unwanteds (book), the first book in the above series

== See also ==
- Wanted (disambiguation)
