= Battleground (The Wanted album) =

Studio album by the Wanted
- Released: 4 November 2011
- Recorded: January–September 2011
- Genre: Dance-pop
- Length: 43:32
- Label: Island
- Producers: Steve Mac; Harry Sommerdahl; Fabian Torsson; Jack McManus; Paro; Tortuga; Xenomania; Tricky Stewart; Mike Green; Guy Chambers; Chris Young; Eliot Kennedy; Andrew Frampton; Phat Fabe; James Jayawardena; Ash Howes

The Wanted chronology
The Wanted (2010)	Battleground (2011)	The Wanted EP (2012)

Singles from Battleground
- 1. "Gold Forever" Released: 13 March 2011; 2. "Glad You Came" Released: 10 July 2011; 3. "Lightning" Released: 16 October 2011; 4. "Warzone" Released: 26 December 2011

Battleground is the second studio album by British-Irish boy band the Wanted. It was released on 4 November 2011 through Island Records.

== Background ==
In January 2011, the group began work on their second studio album with previous songwriter and producer Steve Mac. In February 2011, it was revealed the group would be releasing the official Comic Relief single for 2011. In April 2011, the group embarked on their first headline tour, playing 16 dates in 13 different UK cities. The tour was in support of their debut album The Wanted but whilst on tour, the group previewed the song, "Lightning" from their new album. The track was co-written by the band and Ed Drewett. Max George confirmed on 28 September that the album was complete and the following day, Nathan Sykes confirmed the album would be released with the title Battleground.

In March 2012, Billboard reported that Battleground was "slated to arrive stateside this fall" as the band's second US release, after their debut EP. This did not happen, however, and instead, their first album to be released in the US will be their third overall album, Word of Mouth.

== Singles ==
"Gold Forever" was released as the lead single from the album on 13 March 2011. It was also the official Comic Relief single for 2011. The track debuted at number three in the UK, number two in Scotland and number 13 in Ireland. It is currently their third most successful single, spending a total of eight weeks on the UK top 75. It was also released as the third single from the group's debut US album, The Wanted: The EP. Following the Wanted member Tom Parker's death from a brain tumour on 30 March 2022, "Gold Forever" surged in sales and streams. The song debuted at number 2 on the UK Official Singles Sales Top 100 on 1 April 2022.

"Glad You Came" was released on 10 July 2011 as the second single. It became their second UK number one and first number one in Ireland, where it spent five weeks at the summit. The track is also their first to be successful on an international basis, charting at number 20 in both Australia and New Zealand, number 12 in the Netherlands and also reached number one on the Canadian Hot 100. The song is also a commercial success in the United States, peaking at number three on the Billboard Hot 100 chart as of 29 March 2012. It is currently their most successful single in the UK. It was also released as the second single from The Wanted: The EP.

"Lightning" was released on 16 October 2011 as the third single. It reached number two in the UK and Scotland and number five in Ireland. In Australia, the track has peaked at number 79. The track is currently their third most successful single. "Warzone" was confirmed as the album's fourth single in early November. It was released on 26 December 2011.

== Critical reception ==
Professional ratings
Review scores
Source	Rating
AllMusic	3/5 stars
4Music	4/5 stars
BBC Music	positive
Digital Spy	4/5 stars
OK!	3/5 stars
Virgin Media	2/5 stars
Media Essentials	3.5/5 stars

The album received mostly favourable reviews from music critics. Jon O'Brien wrote for AllMusic that "Battleground, is disappointingly a little more pedestrian than its predecessor", writing that "Battleground should still consolidate their position as heirs to the boy band throne, but with the likes of One Direction now snapping at their heels, they'll have to rediscover their inventive streak in the future if they are to ever take the crown." Nick Levine wrote for BBC that the album is "a solid pop platter that's not lacking in personality – even if the latter does manifest itself in a smattering of lyrics clunkier than testing day at the seat belt factory." Robert Copsey wrote for Digital Spy that "Though the end result shows that they may have taken the battle of the boybands a touch too seriously, much to their credit they come out the other side largely unscathed." David Griffiths wrote for 4Music that "it's an album which wisely leaves the listener wanting more and suggests that this is a band with a very bright future." Matthew Horton wrote a mixed review for Virgin Media that "It's a curiously bloodless affair though, with none of the boys yet to establish an identity, and too much sails past without leaving an impression."

== Commercial performance ==
The album debuted at number 4 in Ireland, becoming their first top ten album in the country. In the United Kingdom, the album debuted at number 5. It sold 47,530 copies in its first week. Although debuting at one position lower than their debut album, its sales were 22.91% copies higher. The album has since been certified Platinum by the British Phonographic Industry (BPI) for sales of over 300,000 copies in the United Kingdom.

== Tour ==
The Wanted embarked on their first arena tour across the UK and Ireland in February and March 2012 to promote the album.

Date	City	Country	Venue
The Code Tour:
15 February 2012	Nottingham	England	Capital FM Arena
17 February 2012	Manchester	England	Manchester Evening News Arena
18 February 2012	Sheffield	England	Motorpoint Arena
20 February 2012	Brighton	England	Brighton Centre
23 February 2012	Cardiff	Wales	Motorpoint Arena Cardiff
24 February 2012	Liverpool	England	Echo Arena Liverpool
25 February 2012	Newcastle	England	Metro Radio Arena
27 February 2012	Glasgow	Scotland	S.E.C.C
28 February 2012	Aberdeen	Scotland	A.E.C.C
1 March 2012	Birmingham	England	LG Arena
2 March 2012	Bournemouth	England	Bournemouth International Centre
3 March 2012	London	England	The O2 Arena
5 March 2012	Brighton	England	Brighton Centre
6 March 2012	Bournemouth	England	Bournemouth International Centre
8 March 2012	Belfast	Northern Ireland	Odyssey Arena
9 March 2012	Dublin	Ireland	The O2
12 March 2012	Manchester	England	Manchester Evening News Arena
14 March 2012	Birmingham	England	National Indoor Arena
15 March 2022	Cardiff	Wales	Motorpoint Arena Cardiff
17 March 2012	London	England	Wembley Arena

Setlist:

1. "Invincible"
2. "Lose My Mind"
3. "Rocket"
4. "The Weekend"
5. "Lie To Me"
6. "Lightning"
7. "Last To Know"
8. "Dagger"
9. "Heart Vacancy"
10. "I Want It All"
11. "I'll Be Your Strength"
12. "Warzone"
13. "Medley:"
  1. "Viva la Vida
  2. "Every Teardrop Is a Waterfall"
  3. "Paradise"
  4. "Fix You"
14. "Say It On The Radio"
15. "Gold Forever"
16. "All Time Low"
17. "Glad You Came"

== Track listing ==
No.	Title	Writer(s)	Producer(s)	Length
1.	"Glad You Came"	Steve Mac; Wayne Hector; Ed Drewett	Mac	3:18
2.	"Lightning"	Mac; Hector; Drewett	Mac	3:26
3.	"Warzone"	Jack MacManus; Harry Sommerdahl; Max George; Nathan Sykes	Sommerdahl	3:09
4.	"Invincible"	McManus; Sommerdahl; George; Sykes; Kaneswaran	Sommerdahl	3:38
5.	"Last to Know"	Heather Bright; Pär Westerlund; Joakim Olovsson; Björn Olovsson	Paro; Tortuga	3:34
6.	"I'll Be Your Strength"	Brian Higgins; Uzoechi Emenike; Matt Gray; Cleary; Owen Parker; Miranda Cooper; Jay McGuiness; Sykes; Toby Scott	Xenomania	3:25
7.	"Rocket"	Diane Warren	Tricky Stewart; Mike Green	3:15
8.	"I Want It All"	Guy Chambers; Siva Kaneswaran; Daniel Kaneswaran	Chambers	3:21
9.	"The Weekend"	Tom Parker; Sykes; Chris Young	Young	3:08
10.	"Lie to Me"	Parker; Eliot Kennedy; Nina Woodford	Kennedy	3:44
11.	"Gold Forever"	Mac; Hector; Claude Kelly	Mac	3:58

Deluxe edition (bonus tracks)
No.	Title	Writer(s)	Producer(s)	Length
12.	"Dagger"	S. Kaneswaran; Sykes; Andrew Frampton	Frampton	3:49
13.	"Rock Your Body"	George; Sykes; S. Kaneswaran; Parker; McGuiness; Young	Young	3:54
14.	"Turn It Off"	Jay McGuiness; S. Kaneswaran; Sommerdahl; Brittany Burton	Sommerdahl; Phat Fabe	3:33
15.	"Where I Belong"	S. Kaneswaran; Kennedy; James Jayawardena	Kennedy; Jayawardena; Ash Howes	4:07

== Charts ==
=== Weekly charts ===
Chart (2011–2012)	Peak position
French Albums (SNEP)	129
Irish Albums (IRMA)	4
Scottish Albums (OCC)	5
Spanish Albums (PROMUSICAE)	56
UK Albums (OCC)	5

=== Year-end charts ===
Chart (2011)	Position
UK Albums (OCC)	51

== Certifications ==
Region	Certification	Certified units/sales
Ireland (IRMA)	Gold	7,500^{^}
New Zealand (RMNZ)	Gold	7,500^{‡}
United Kingdom (BPI)	Platinum	300,000^{^}
^{^} Shipments figures based on certification alone.^{‡} Sales+streaming figures based on certification alone.

== Release history ==
Region	Date	Format	Label
Ireland	4 November 2011	CD; digital download	Island
Hong Kong	7 November 2011	CD; digital download	Island
United Kingdom	7 November 2011	CD; digital download	Island
Brazil	22 November 2011	CD; digital download	Universal
