= Glad You Came =

2011 single by The Wanted

Single by The Wanted

from the album Battleground and The Wanted: The EP
- B-side: "Iris" (Live Tour Performance)
- Released: 24 May 2011
- Recorded: 2011
- Studio: Rokstone Studios (London, United Kingdom)
- Genre: Eurodance
- Length: 3:18
- Label: Island; Global Talent; Mercury
- Songwriters: Steve Mac; Wayne Hector; Ed Drewett
- Producer: Steve Mac

The Wanted singles chronology
"Gold Forever" (2011)	"Glad You Came" (2011)	"Lightning" (2011)

The Wanted US singles chronology
"All Time Low" (2011)	"Glad You Came" (2011)	"Heart Vacancy" (2012)

Alternative cover
- U.S. cover

Music video
- "Glad You Came" on YouTube

"Glad You Came", also known as "I'm Glad You Came", is a song by British-Irish boy band The Wanted, released on 24 May 2011 as the second single from their second studio album, Battleground. The song was written by Steve Mac, Wayne Hector and Ed Drewett, and produced by Steve Mac.

"Glad You Came" peaked at number one on the UK Singles Chart and also topped the charts of Ireland, Japan, and Venezuela. In North America, the song reached number two in Canada and number three in the United States, becoming their only top ten hit in the US.

== Background ==
The song was written and produced by Steve Mac. It serves as the second single from The Wanted's second album, Battleground, which was released on 7 November 2011. Band member Tom Parker said of the song, "We all felt it was a new, refreshing sound and a perfect song for the summer which really gets you in the mood for a party."

The song premiered on the radio on 24 May 2011. The song was also remixed by Alex Gaudino. The American television series Glee covered the track in the episode "On My Way", which was aired during the third season. It was performed at the Regionals competition between New Directions and the Dalton Academy Warblers. Sebastian (Grant Gustin) leads the performance.

== Critical reception ==
Robert Copsey of Digital Spy gave the song four out of five stars writing, "'I decided you look well on me/ So let's go somewhere no-one else can see/You and me,' they continue over a cantering beat and featherlight hook before launching into a carnival-inspired chorus fizzier than a frozen Daiquiri. 'My universe will never be the same/ I'm glad you came,' they croon on the outro. The result is their catchiest effort since 'All Time Low', though on repeated listens we're not buying this innocent act they're sporting one bit." David Griffiths wrote for 4Music that the song is "definitely their most danceable effort to date." About.com's Bill Lamb gave to the song 3.5 out of 5 stars, writing that the song has "genial vocals", a "pop-dance beat" and a "catchy synth hook", but he also noted that it has "frothy lyrics" and "little memorable weight to the song". He praised Max's solo in the beginning and also praised "the keyboard hook that nearly steals the show from the group." To conclude, he wrote that "Glad You Came" is a cheerful, uptempo tune that is easy to dance with, and it is little more than that.

Rolling Stone named "Glad You Came" the forty-fourth best song of 2012, citing the group's "push at the genre's PG-13 rating with a club-bumper that dares to raise the specter of under age inebriation."

In 2018, the song was ranked thirty fifth by Billboard in their compilation of the 100 Greatest Boyband Songs of All Time.

The song became famous in the Philippines during Vice Ganda's appearance at the GMA Network Center on the July 1st, 2023 episode of the noontime variety show It's Showtime.

== Chart performance ==
"Glad You Came" entered at the top of the UK Singles Chart on 17 July 2011 – for the week ending dated 23 July 2011 – with first-week sales of over 117,000 copies, becoming the band's second number-one single on the chart following "All Time Low" in August 2010. Since then, "Glad You Came" has been certified double platinum by the British Phonographic Industry (BPI) for sales and streams of over 1,200,000 units. In Ireland, "Glad You Came" entered at the top of the Irish Singles Chart, making it the band's first number one single in the country. The song remained at the top of the chart for five weeks.

The single was certified platinum in both Australia and New Zealand for shipments of 75,000 and 15,000 copies respectively. It was also certified gold in Italy. In the United States, "Glad You Came" became their first to chart on the Billboard Hot 100, peaking at number three for four non-consecutive weeks after it was covered on the Fox television series Glee, and becoming the highest American chart entry by a British boy band, surpassing Take That who peaked at number seven on the Billboard Hot 100 with "Back for Good" in November 1995. This record was broken by fellow British-Irish boy band One Direction when their single "Best Song Ever" peaked at number two on the Billboard Hot 100 in July 2013. The song also peaked at number four on the Adult Top 40, at number five on the Dance Club Songs and topped the US Pop Songs and the Mainstream Top 40 charts. The song has since then been certified triple platinum by the Recording Industry Association of America (RIAA) for sales of over 3,600,000 copies in the United States.

The single additionally topped the charts of Japan and Venezuela. It also peaked within the top ten of the charts in Brazil, Canada, the Czech Republic, Hungary, Slovakia and Spain whilst also charting in other numerous countries around the world as well. The song was the best-selling song by a boy band in digital history before One Direction's "What Makes You Beautiful" overtook its sales in July 2012. "Glad You Came" is to date The Wanted's only top 40 hit in the United States.

== Music video ==
The music video was created by Director X and was filmed in Ibiza, Spain. It sees the band on the beach, in a club and at a houseparty each with an individual woman. It was uploaded to YouTube on 10 June 2011. Jay McGuiness revealed to MTV UK: "The theory of the video was take The Wanted to Ibiza and just film everything and then just cut bits that were useable. But the girls were models, they weren't just girls we picked." However Max George admitted: "Actually no, the girl I had to spend time with was just literally picked up off the street after a night out." The video has achieved over 254 million views on YouTube as of July 2024; becoming their most watched video on the site. It also starred a cameo from footballer John-Joe O'Toole.

== Track listing ==
- UK digital single
1. "Glad You Came" (Karaoke Version) – 3:17
- UK digital EP
1. "Glad You Came" – 3:17
2. "Glad You Came" (Alex Gaudino Radio Edit) – 3:05
3. "Glad You Came" (Alex Gaudino Club Mix) – 7:55
4. "Iris" (Live Tour Performance) – 4:01
- UK CD single
1. "Glad You Came" – 3:17
2. "Glad You Came" (Alex Gaudino Radio Edit) – 3:05
3. "Gold Forever" (BBC Radio 1 Live Lounge Session) – 3:35
- U.S. and Canada digital single
1. "Glad You Came" (Radio Edit) – 3:18
- U.S. digital remix EP
1. "Glad You Came" (Mixin Marc and Tony Svedja Radio Mix) – 3:58
2. "Glad You Came" (Mixin Marc and Tony Svedja Club Remix) – 5:52
3. "Glad You Came" (Mixin Marc and Tony Svedja Dub) – 5:44
4. "Glad You Came" (Bassjackers Remix Edit) – 3:40
5. "Glad You Came" (Bassjackers Extended Club) – 5:04
6. "Glad You Came" (Bassjackers Dub) – 5:52
7. "Glad You Came" (Alex Gaudino Radio Full Vocal) – 3:05
8. "Glad You Came" (Alex Gaudino Club Remix) – 7:54
9. "Glad You Came" (Alex Gaudino Dub) – 7:51
- U.S. Walmart exclusive CD single
1. "Glad You Came" – 3:18
2. "Glad You Came" (Mixin Marc and Tony Svedja Radio Mix) – 3:58
- U.S. promotional CD single
1. "Glad You Came" (Radio Edit) – 3:18
2. "Glad You Came" (Alex Gaudino Radio Full Vocal) – 3:05
3. "Glad You Came" (Alex Gaudino Club Remix) – 7:54
4. "Glad You Came" (Alex Gaudino Dub) – 7:51
5. "Glad You Came" (Bassjackers Remix Edit) – 3:40
6. "Glad You Came" (Bassjackers Extended Club) – 5:04
7. "Glad You Came" (Bassjackers Dub) – 5:52
8. "Glad You Came" (Mixin Marc and Tony Svedja Radio Mix) – 3:58
9. "Glad You Came" (Mixin Marc and Tony Svedja Club Remix) – 5:52

== Charts ==
=== Weekly charts ===
Chart (2011–2012)	Peak position
Australia (ARIA)	20
Austria (Ö3 Austria Top 40)	68
Belgium (Ultratip Bubbling Under Flanders)	12
Belgium (Ultratop 50 Wallonia)	29
Brazil (Billboard Brasil Hot 100)	32
Brazil Hot Pop Songs	6
Canada Hot 100 (Billboard)	2
Canada AC (Billboard)	4
Canada CHR/Top 40 (Billboard)	1
Canada Hot AC (Billboard)	3
Czech Republic Airplay (ČNS IFPI)	7
Denmark (Tracklisten)	29
France (SNEP)	30
Honduras (Honduras Top 50)	22
Hungary (Rádiós Top 40)	4
Ireland (IRMA)	1
Israel International Airplay (Media Forest)	2
Japan Hot 100 (Billboard)	1
Mexico (Billboard Mexican Airplay)	30
Mexico Anglo (Monitor Latino)	16
Netherlands (Dutch Top 40)	12
Netherlands (Single Top 100)	31
New Zealand (Recorded Music NZ)	13
Scottish Singles Sales (Official Charts)	1
Slovakia Airplay (ČNS IFPI)	5
Spain (Promusicae)	34
Spain (Airplay Chart)	10
UK Singles (Official Charts)	1
UK Airplay (Music Week)	4
US Billboard Hot 100	3
US Adult Contemporary (Billboard)	17
US Adult Pop Airplay (Billboard)	4
US Dance Club Songs (Billboard)	5
US Hot Latin Songs (Billboard)	37
US Pop Airplay (Billboard)	1
US Rhythmic Airplay (Billboard)	13
Venezuela Pop/Rock General (Record Report)	1

=== Year-end charts ===
Chart (2011)	Position
Ireland (IRMA)	18
Netherlands (Dutch Top 40)	57
UK Singles (Official Charts Company)	22
UK Airplay (Music Week)	23

Chart (2012)	Position
Brazil (Crowley)	4
Canada (Canadian Hot 100)	5
Hungary (Rádiós Top 40)	92
US Billboard Hot 100	6
US Adult Contemporary (Billboard)	41
US Adult Pop Songs (Billboard)	14
US Mainstream Top 40 (Billboard)	3
US Rhythmic (Billboard)	47

Chart (2013)	Position
Japan (Japan Hot 100)	35

== Certifications ==
Region	Certification	Certified units/sales
Australia (ARIA)	Platinum	70,000^{^}
Brazil (Pro-Música Brasil)	4× Diamond	1,000,000^{‡}
Canada (Music Canada)	5× Platinum	400,000^{*}
Denmark (IFPI Danmark)	Platinum	90,000^{‡}
Italy (FIMI)	Gold	15,000^{‡}
New Zealand (RMNZ)	3× Platinum	90,000^{‡}
Norway (IFPI Norway)	Gold	5,000^{*}
Spain (Promusicae)	Gold	30,000^{‡}
United Kingdom (BPI)	2× Platinum	1,200,000^{‡}
United States (RIAA)	3× Platinum	3,600,000
Streaming
Norway (IFPI Norway)	Platinum	3,000,000^{†}
^{*} Sales figures based on certification alone.^{^} Shipments figures based on certification alone.^{‡} Sales+streaming figures based on certification alone.^{†} Streaming-only figures based on certification alone.

== Radio date and release history ==
Region	Date	Format	Label
United Kingdom	24 May 2011	Mainstream radio airplay	Global Talent; Universal Island
United Kingdom	10 July 2011	Digital download	Global Talent; Universal Island
Ireland	10 July 2011	Digital download	Global Talent; Universal Island
Spain	10 July 2011	Digital download	Global Talent; Universal Island
Germany	10 July 2011	Digital download	Global Talent; Universal Island
United Kingdom	11 July 2011	CD single	Global Talent; Universal Island
Australia	12 August 2011	Digital download	Global Talent; Universal Island
United States	13 September 2011, 24 January 2012	Mainstream radio airplay	Island Def Jam
United States	18 October 2011	Digital download	Island Def Jam

== Vize version ==
"Glad You Came"

Single by Vize
- Released: 12 November 2018
- Recorded: 2018
- Length: 3:18
- Label: Heaven Shall Dance; Kontor Records; Ultra Records; Central Station; Clippers Sounds; Happy Music
- Songwriters: Ed Drewett; Wayne Hector; Steve Mac
- Producer: Vize

On 12 November 2018, Vize released a cover of the song accompanied by a music video. The song released via Heaven Shall Dance, Kontor Records, Ultra Records, Central Station, Clippers Sounds and Happy Music charted in several countries as Germany, France, CIS and Belgium.

=== Track listing ===
Digital single

1. "Glad You Came" - 3:18

Digital extended single

1. "Glad You Came" (extended mix) - 4:26

Digital EP

1. "Glad You Came" (Modern Citizens mix) - 3:09
2. "Glad You Came" (Modern Citizens extended mix) - 4:27

Remixes (Italy, Spain)

1. "Glad You Came" (Sini remix) - 2:55
2. "Glad You Came" (VIP remix) - 2:37
3. "Glad You Came" (Barkley remix) - 2:38
4. "Glad You Came" (Sini extended remix) - 3:56
5. "Glad You Came" (VIP extended remix) 3:36
6. "Glad You Came" (Barkley extended remix) - 3:33

Remixes (Australia, New Zealand)

1. "Glad You Came" (Modern Citizens remix edit) - 3:09
2. "Glad You Came" (Jesse Bloch remix edit) - 4:09
3. "Glad You Came" (Modern Citizens extended remix) - 4:27
4. "Glad You Came" (Jesse Bloch extended remix) - 4:37

The Remixes (USA)

1. "Glad You Came" (Sini remix) - 2:55
2. "Glad You Came" (VIP remix) - 2:37
3. "Glad You Came" (Barkley remix) - 2:38

=== Charts ===
==== Weekly charts ====
Chart (2018–2019)	Peak position
Belgium (Ultratip Bubbling Under Wallonia)	32
CIS (Tophit Top Radio Hits)	435
CIS (Tophit Top Radio & YouTube Hits)	206
France (SNEP)	151
Germany (GfK)	44

== See also ==
- List of number-one singles of 2011 (Ireland)
- List of UK Singles Chart number ones of the 2010s
