= The Wanted (EP) =

EP by The Wanted
- Released: 24 April 2012
- Studio: Rokstone Studios, Metrophonic Studios (London, UK); Patriot Studios (Denver, US); Westlake (Los Angeles, US); Kinglet Studios, A-Side Studios (Stockholm, Sweden)
- Genre: Dance-pop
- Length: 34:47
- Label: Mercury
- Producer: Cutfather; Phat Fabe; Carl Falk; Mike Green; Jonas Jeberg; Steve Mac; Tricky Stewart; Harry Sommerdahl; Rami Yacoub; The Wideboys

The Wanted chronology
| Battleground (2011) | The Wanted (2012) | Word of Mouth (2013) |

Singles from The Wanted
- 1. "All Time Low" Released: 1 July 2011; 2. "Glad You Came" Released: 13 September 2011; 3. "Lightning" Released: 24 November 2011; 4. "Gold Forever" Released: 20 March 2012; 5. "Heart Vacancy" Released: 10 April 2012; 6. "Chasing the Sun" Released: 17 April 2012

The Wanted is the first extended play by British-Irish boy band The Wanted. It was released on 24 April 2012 as the band's debut release in Canada and United States via Mercury Records. The album comprises material from The Wanted's two studio albums: The Wanted (2010) and Battleground (2011), as well as two new songs: "Chasing the Sun" and "Satellite".

== Background ==
During recording sessions for The Wanted's second British studio album, Battleground, it was announced that a record deal with American label Def Jam Recordings was in the pipeline. It was reported that the three-album deal would see the group release material in the United States as early as February 2012. It was later confirmed by Def Jam that the band's first stateside release would be a ten-track EP, that would consist of a mixture of previously available material, alongside two all-new tracks, exclusive to the American market. Soon after the report, the band teased that they had been in the studio with a "big American star", recording a duet entitled "Jealousy". The "star" was later revealed to be Rihanna. It was later reported by Digital Spy that after the song had been mixed, tuned and finalised, the final mix "didn't cut it", and as such, the song had been completely scrapped, and was not going to be released.

Band member Jay McGuiness later revealed that the group had been in the studio with songwriter and performer Ryan Tedder, working a number of different songs, including one track which was tentatively titled "Satellite". British rapper Example later confirmed that he had written a song for the EP, entitled "Chasing the Sun", which he claimed, if released as a single, could be the track that would officially make the band a staple of the American music industry. Justin Bieber's manager Scooter Braun later backed the group for American success, claiming "they could be as big as the Backstreet Boys or 'N Sync with a little bit of guidance." In March 2012, the EP's track listing was confirmed to contain eight previously released tracks, including all seven of the band's British singles – "All Time Low", "Glad You Came", "Gold Forever", "Lose My Mind", "Heart Vacancy", "Lightning" and "Warzone", the album track "Rocket", and two all-new tracks – "Chasing the Sun" and "Satellite".

== Singles ==
"All Time Low" was released as the EP's lead single on 1 July 2011. The single was available in three formats – a standard download, a nine-track remix EP and as part of a five-track live performance EP recorded at the iTunes festival, London, in March 2011. Aside from charting at number 19 on the Billboard Hot Dance Club Songs chart, the single failed to achieve any sort of commercial success, as its release did not receive any promotion.

"Glad You Came" was released as the EP's second single on 18 October 2011. This time, a much heavier promotional schedule was given to the single, and as such, following heavy radio play and television coverage, the single entered the Billboard Hot 100 at number 64. The success of the single soon skyrocketed in January 2012 after the band gave a live performance of the song on The Ellen DeGeneres Show, which became their first ever TV performance in the United States. The band went on tour throughout America in January 2012 to promote the single, and a number of shows became sell-outs. The band soon began to receive nationwide acclaim, and in February 2012, the single's success continued to grow after the song was covered in an episode of the American television drama series Glee. The song began to climb up the Billboard Hot 100, and at the end of February, it peaked at number three, breaking an all-time record, becoming the highest-chart position for a British boy band ever on the chart, beating the existing record of number seven set by Take That's "Back for Good". The band reportedly sold over 180,000 copies of the single over the course of a week.

"Chasing the Sun" was released as the third and final single on 17 April 2012. It was sent to US mainstream radio on 15 May 2012.

== Critical reception ==
Professional ratings
Aggregate scores
| Source | Rating |
|---|---|
| Metacritic | 62/100 |
Review scores
| Source | Rating |
| AllMusic | 4/5 stars |
| Billboard | 3.5/5 stars |
| Entertainment Weekly | B+ |
| HitFix | mixed |
| Los Angeles Times | 1.5/4 stars |
| Rolling Stone | 2/5 stars |

The Wanted received generally positive reviews from music critics upon its release. At Metacritic, which assigns a normalised rating out of 100 to reviews from mainstream critics, the album received an average score of 62 based on 5 reviews, which indicates "generally favorable reviews".

== Commercial reception ==
In the United States, The Wanted debuted at number seven on the Billboard 200, with first-week sales of 34,000 copies. To date, the album has sold 207,000 copies in the United States. On 3 July 2012, the group officially announced they would be visiting Australia and New Zealand in promotion of the EP. They visited the countries in August 2012.

== Track listing ==
The Wanted EP track listing
| No. | Title | Writer(s) | Producer(s) | Length |
|---|---|---|---|---|
| 1. | "Glad You Came" | Steve Mac; Wayne Hector; Ed Drewett | Mac | 3:18 |
| 2. | "Chasing the Sun" (EP version) | Alex Smith; Elliot Gleave | Smith | 3:18 |
| 3. | "All Time Low" (EP re-master) | Mac; Hector; Drewett | Mac | 3:25 |
| 4. | "Satellite" | Ryan Tedder; Noel Zancanella; Evan Kidd Bogart | Tedder; Zancanella | 3:02 |
| 5. | "Lightning" | Mac; Hector; Drewett | Mac | 3:23 |
| 6. | "Heart Vacancy" | Mich Hansen; Jonas Jeberg; Lucas Secon; Wayne Hector | Jeberg; Cutfather | 3:43 |
| 7. | "Gold Forever" | Mac; Hector; Claude Kelly | Mac | 3:58 |
| Total length: | | | | 24:07 |

The Wanted: Special Edition tracks
| No. | Title | Writer(s) | Producer(s) | Length |
|---|---|---|---|---|
| 8. | "Lose My Mind" | Nina Woodford; Rami Yacoub; Carl Falk | Rami Yacoub; Carl Falk; The Wideboys | 3:47 |
| 9. | "Warzone" | Jack McManus; Harry Sommerdahl; Max George; Nathan Sykes | Phat Fabe; Sommerdahl | 3:38 |
| 10. | "Rocket" | Diane Warren | Tricky Stewart; Mike Green | 3:15 |
| Total length: | | | | 34:47 |

Japanese edition bonus tracks
| No. | Title | Writer(s) | Producer(s) | Length |
|---|---|---|---|---|
| 11. | "Lie to Me" | Tom Parker; Eliot Kennedy; Nina Woodford | Kennedy | 3:44 |
| 12. | "Invincible" | Fabian Torsson; McManus; Max George; Nathan Sykes | Torsson; McManus | 3:09 |
| 13. | "Replace Your Heart" | Cathy Dennis; Greg Kurstin; Kasia Livingston | Kurstin | 4:07 |
| 14. | "Let's Get Ugly" | Ennio Morricone; Guy Chambers; Mac Stagger | Chambers; Richard Flack | 3:31 |
| 15. | "The Weekend" | Parker; Sykes; Chris Young | Young | 3:08 |

Japanese deluxe edition bonus DVD
| No. | Title | Director(s) | Length |
|---|---|---|---|
| 1. | "Glad You Came" | Director X | 3:18 |
| 2. | "All Time Low" | | 3:25 |
| 3. | "Lightning" | Director X | 3:23 |
| 4. | "Heart Vacancy" | | 3:43 |
| 5. | "Gold Forever" | Nigel Dick | 3:58 |
| 6. | "Lose My Mind" | Dick | 3:47 |
| 7. | "Warzone" | Director X | 3:38 |
| 8. | "All Time Low" (The Live Experience) | | 3:25 |
| 9. | "Interview for Japan" | | 14:00 |

== Charts ==
=== Weekly charts ===
Weekly chart performance for The Wanted
| Chart (2012) | Peak position |
|---|---|
| Canadian Albums (Billboard) | 8 |
| US Billboard 200 | 7 |

=== Year-end charts ===
Year-end chart performance for The Wanted
| Chart (2012) | Position |
|---|---|
| US Billboard 200 | 194 |

== Release history ==
Release history and formats for The Wanted
| Region | Date | Format | Edition | Label |
|---|---|---|---|---|
| Canada | 24 April 2012 | CD; digital download | Standard edition | Universal |
| United States | 24 April 2012 | CD; digital download | Standard edition | Mercury |
| Australia | 27 April 2012 | Digital download | Special edition | Universal |
| New Zealand | 27 April 2012 | Digital download | Special edition | Universal |
| Japan | 8 May 2013 | CD; CD+DVD | Special edition | Universal |
| Australia | 6 July 2012 | CD | Special edition | Universal |
