= Broderick Hunter =

American model and actor (born 1991)

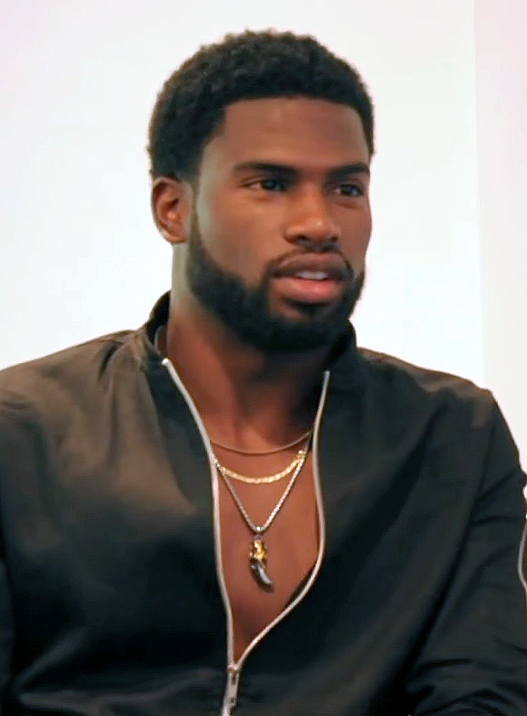
- Hunter in 2017
- Born: Broderick Hunter Jr. January 3, 1991 (age 35); Fontana, California, U.S.
- Occupations: Model; actor
- Years active: 2011–present

Broderick Hunter Jr. (born January 3, 1991), is an American model and actor. Hunter started his modeling career in 2011 at age of 20, after being asked to become a model for a photoshoot. He has since starred in editorials for various publications, including Cosmopolitan, Maxim, Essence, Vogue Paris and Italian GQ.

He is from Fontana, California.

== Early life ==
Broderick Hunter Jr. was born on January 3, 1991, in Fontana, California to Broderick Hunter Sr. and Chika Hunter. He has an older sister, Jole. He attended Etiwanda High School, where he played basketball, which eventually led him to a scholarship for University of Central Florida.

== Career ==
Hunter started his modeling career in 2011 at age of 20, after being asked to become a model for a photoshoot. He has since starred in editorials for various publications, including Cosmopolitan, Maxim, Essence, Vogue Paris and Italian GQ, and has also been featured on the covers of XIOX, Fantastics and OnFitness magazines. Publications, such as Business Insider, People and Harper's Bazaar, have featured him on their list of "sexiest men on Instagram". Additionally, Hunter has been the face of Ralph Lauren Corporation and landed a campaign with Icelandic Glacial in 2017.

=== Acting ===
In 2011, Hunter appeared in the music video for "Warzone" by The Wanted. In 2012, while being in Milan for Dsquared²'s fashion week, he caught American singer Ciara's attention, who was also there and later asked him star in her music video for "Sorry", which premiered in September of the same year. In 2017, he appeared in an episode of Issa Rae's comedy-drama series Insecure. In 2018, Hunter starred on the sitcoms Marlon and Rel.

== Filmography ==
=== Films ===
Year	Title	Role	Notes
2017	Nocturnal Animals	unknown	uncredited

=== Television series ===
Year	Title	Role	Notes
2017	Insecure	Felix	Episode: "Hella LA"
2018	Marlon	Todd	Episode: "Homecoming"
2018	Rel	Barry	Episode: "One Night Stand"
2019	A Black Lady Sketch Show	unknown	Episode: "Why Are Her Pies Wet, Lord?"

=== Music videos ===
Year	Title	Artist	Role
2011	"Warzone"	The Wanted	Love interest
2012	"Sorry"	Ciara	Love interest
2017	"Music"	Mystery Skulls	The host
2022	"Surprise"	Chloe Bailey	Love interest
