= Wanting: The Power of Mimetic Desire in Everyday Life =

2021 book by Luke Burgis

- First edition
- Author: Luke Burgis
- Illustrator: Liana Finck
- Cover artist: Jonathan Bush
- Subject: Desire
- Genre: Non-fiction, Sociology
- Publisher: St. Martin's Press
- Publication date: June 2021
- Media type: Print (hardcover & paperback)
- Pages: 304
- ISBN: 9781250262486
- Dewey Decimal: 150.19/5-dc23

Wanting: The Power of Mimetic Desire in Everyday Life is a non-fiction book written by Luke Burgis and published by St. Martin's Press. The book was prompted by Burgis's experience losing a deal in 2008 to sell his company. According to the book, the episode brought on an existential crisis that led Burgis to René Girard and his mimetic theory. The theory argues that much of what people desire is formed through mimicking what others desire. The book applies mimetic theory to the business world and the experiences of everyday life.

== Background ==
In 2022, Burgis held the position of program director and entrepreneur in residence at the Ciocca Center for Principled Entrepreneurship at Catholic University of America. After attending New York University, Burgis worked on Wall Street and founded four companies. In 2008, a startup company that Burgis had founded called Fit Fuel was failing. Burgis was in the process of selling the company to Tony Hsieh, but the deal fell through and the business collapsed. According to Burgis, the failed business deal and collapse of the company helped him realize that he was trying to imitate his idols rather than pursue what he wants. Burgis was then introduced to the work of René Girard and his mimetic theory, which he used to reinterpret his Fit Fuel failure, seeing it as a result of desires he formed through mimicking and modeling people such as Hsieh. This prompted Burgis to write the book and apply the theory to his own experiences.

== Content ==
The book argues that unhappiness and conflict arise because people form desires by mimicking what others desire. In the book, Burgis calls mimicked desires "thin desires," which tend to be misdirected and unfulfilling. Our world, the book says, is shaped by the "movements of desire." These are stimulated by marketers and politicians who help shape what people buy, where they go, and who they form relationships with. For the individual, the result is a life more caught up in pursuing mimicked desires than in fulfilling desires which are more intrinsic. Mimetic desire therefore causes social disharmony and conflict, Burgis says. He ties mimetic desire into "scapegoating", arguing that scapegoating is a byproduct of conflict spawned by mimicking.

== Reception ==
The bulletin of the Colloquium on Violence & Religion stated that Burgis did not write the book in a systematic academic or textbook form, choosing instead to focus on anecdotes. In its review, the Financial Times said "You may not entirely agree with Girard's concepts, but the book does offer some fresh perspectives on our desires." Publishers Weekly described the book's audience as those who don't mind "psychology mixed in with their inspiration." According to The Times, the book is "part philosophical tract, part self-help guide" and described the book as both "thought-provoking" and "deeply moral." Strategy+Business included the book in their list of best books of 2021 and said that the book's main take-away for executives is that they might benefit by using "transcendent desires" to lead their organizations. The bulletin of the Colloquium on Violence & Religion said that Burgis provided a practical presentation of Girard's work that is relevant to peoples' lives. However, it also expressed qualms that his portrayal of "anti-mimetic" strategies could be misread.
