= Ann W. Astell =

American theologian (born 1952)

President of the Colloquium on Violence & Religion
- In office 2011–2015
- Preceded by: Wolfgang Palaver
- Succeeded by: Jeremiah Alberg

Personal details
- Born: Ann Winifred Astell; January 28, 1952 (age 74) Fort Atkinson, Wisconsin, U.S.
- Education: University of Wisconsin–Madison; Marquette University
- Occupation: Literary scholar; Theologian
- Awards: Guggenheim Fellowship (2001)

Academic background
- Thesis: The Song of Songs in the Middle Ages (1987)
- Doctoral advisor: Alger Doane

Academic work
- Discipline: Literature; Theology
- Institutions: Purdue University; University of Notre Dame

Ann Winifred Astell (born January 28, 1952) is an American literary scholar and theologian. A 2001 Guggenheim Fellow, she specializes in literature and religion, has worked as a professor at Purdue University and at University of Notre Dame, and has served as president of the Society for the Study of Christian Spirituality (2011–2012) and Colloquium on Violence & Religion (2011–2015).

== Biography ==
Ann Winifred Astell was born in Fort Atkinson, Wisconsin, on January 28, 1952, the daughter of legal secretary and Johnson Hill Press proofreader Mary (née Schiferl) and popcorn farmer John Malcolm Astell. She attended Jefferson High School, where she was salutatorian and won a local Associated Press student writing contest two times in a row. She later obtained her BS (1974) in English at the University of Wisconsin–Madison (UW) and took a break from higher education to teach language arts at religious school in the Milwaukee area. She obtained her MA (1981) in English literature at Marquette University, where she also taught literature and rhetorical modes, before returning to UW to get her PhD (1987) in medieval English literature; her dissertation The Song of Songs in the Middle Ages was supervised by Alger Doane.

In 1988, she started working in Purdue University as an assistant professor, before being promoted to associate professor in 1991 and full professor in 1995. In 2007, she moved to University of Notre Dame, where she was now Professor of Theology. She was the Purdue Department of English's director of graduate studies (1997–2000) and the Notre Dame Department of Theology's director of undergraduate studies (2016–2019), and she became part of Purdue's university senate in 2001 and Notre Dame's Academic Council in 2018.

In 2001, she was awarded a Guggenheim Fellowship for "a study of medieval asceticism, mysticism, and aesthetics".

Although she had originally taught and written on literature and English studies at Purdue, she had switched to teaching theological subjects after joining Notre Dame. In 2004, she held a public lecture on the history of Joan of Arc in film at the Religious Arts Festival in West Lafayette. She served as president of the Society for the Study of Christian Spirituality (2011–2012) and Colloquium on Violence & Religion (2011–2015).

== Bibliography ==
=== Edited volumes ===
- Divine Representations: Postmodernism and Spirituality (1994)
- Lay Sanctity, Medieval and Modern (2000)
- (with Bonnie Wheeler) Joan of Arc and Spirituality (2003; New Middle Ages Series)
- (with J. A. Jackson) Levinas and Medieval Literature (2009)
- (with Sandor Goodhart) Sacrifice, Scripture, and Substitution in Ancient Judaism and Christianity (2011)
- (with Dorsey Armstrong and Howell D. Chickering) Magistra Doctissima (2013)
- Saving Fear in Christian Spirituality (2020)

=== Authored books ===
- Job, Boethius, and Epic Truth (1994)
- The Song of Songs in the Middle Ages (1994)
- Chaucer and the Universe of Learning (1996)
- Political Allegory in Late Medieval England (1999)
- Joan of Arc and Sacrificial Authorship (2003)
- Eating Beauty (2006)
