= Ed Drewett =

British singer and songwriter

- Born: Edward James Drewett; 1 April 1988 (age 38)
- Origin: Essex, England
- Genre: Pop
- Occupations: Singer; songwriter
- Instruments: Vocals; piano
- Years active: 2007–present
- Labels: Virgin; Warner/Chappell; EMI
- Website: eddrewett.co.uk

Edward James Drewett (born 1 April 1988) is a British singer and songwriter who is best known for his contributions and collaborations with acts such as Teddy Swims, One Direction, Little Mix, Jonas Blue, The Wanted, Olly Murs and SG Lewis.

== Early life ==
Drewett left The Bishops Stortford High School at age 16 and attended a performing arts college in Charlton, south-east London. He proceeded to attend vocal college BIMM in west London the following year.

== Career ==
2007–2009: Career beginnings

Drewett first gained public recognition in 2007 as a top 20 finalist on the BBC talent search show Any Dream Will Do. At the age of 20, Drewett signed his first publishing contract with Warner/Chappell Music. The following year, he secured a solo record deal with Virgin Records.

2010–2015: Commercial breakthrough and collaborations

In 2010, Drewett appeared as a featured vocalist on Professor Green's single "I Need You Tonight", which reached number three on the UK Singles Chart. That same year, he achieved his first UK number-one single as a songwriter with The Wanted's debut track, "All Time Low". He continued his partnership with the group, co-writing their 2011 global hit "Glad You Came”, which topped the UK charts and reached the top three on the US Billboard Hot 100 and Number 1 on the Billboard Radio Songs chart. In 2012, he co-wrote Olly Murs' multi-platinum single "Dear Darlin’”,

Drewett began writing for One Direction in 2013, co-writing their international hit singles "Best Song Ever" (2013), "Steal My Girl" (2014), and "History" (2015), alongside various tracks for their albums Midnight Memories, FOUR and Made in the A.M. In 2014, he auditioned for the eighth series of Britain's Got Talent, reaching the live semi-finals. In 2015, Drewett co-wrote Little Mix's UK number-one single "Black Magic", which was a UK number 1 for 3 consecutive weeks and earned him a BRIT Award nomination for Song of the Year.

2016–2024: Electronic and Pop releases

In 2017, Drewett collaborated with DJ and producer Jonas Blue to co-write the UK top-five single "Mama", followed by the 2018 singles "Rise” and “Polaroid”, which between them have amassed over 2.5 Billion streams. During this period, he also contributed to the track "On My Own" on Niall Horan's debut solo album, Flicker.

Drewett co-wrote the 2020 song "My Last Breath" with artist and friend, James Newman, which was selected as the UK entry for the Eurovision Song Contest(before the event's cancellation due to the pandemic). In 2022, he co-wrote the dance single "Deep Down" by Alok, Ella Eyre, and Kenny Dope. Between 2022 and 2023, Drewett was also heavily involved in SG Lewis's album AudioLust & HigherLove, co-writing and providing background vocals on eight tracks, including "Holding On”, Lifetime” and "Another Life".

2025–present: Continued songwriting

In 2025, Drewett contributed to Perrie Edwards' self-titled debut solo album, co-writing the tracks "Sand Dancer" and "Cute Aggression". His other 2025 credits included "Ten Years Time" for Henry Moodie, "Saké" for Only The Poets, “Save Me” for Olly Murs, “I Can Die Now" for Ruel, and "All Of America" for Elle Coves.

In 2026, he co-wrote the track "Leftover Time" for James Blunt's album Airplane Mode, and "Falling In Love With Your Friends" for London based singer, MasterPeace. Showcasing Drewetts abilities across multiple genres, in electronic music, he teamed up with SG Lewis and Adam Port for the global house single, "Be The One”, released via the powerhouse German electronic collective Keinemusik.

Drewett continued his high-profile, international collaborations, with writing credits on major releases such as Japanese boy band BE:FIRST with single "Missing", which topped the Billboard Japan Hot 100, and most notably American artist, Teddy Swims' single "Mr. Know It All", which as of 7th November 2026, has reached Number 1 on the Billboard Pop Airplay Chart and Number 1 on the US Top 40, Mediabase Pop Chart.

== Discography ==
=== Solo albums/EPs ===
Year	Album	Peak chart positions	
Year	Album	UK	IRE
2007	All Good	–	–
2010	Ten	–	–
2013	Blink (album sampler)	–	–
2021	Jam Jar	–	–

=== Solo singles ===
Year	Single	Peak chart positions			Album
Year	Single	UK	UK Indie	IRE	Album
2010	"Champagne Lemonade"	84	–	–	Non-album singles
2013	"Undefeated"	–	–	–	Non-album singles
2013	"Drunk Dial"	–	46	–	Non-album singles
2018	"Black Magic"	–	–	–	TEN
2018	"Dear Darlin'"	–	–	–	TEN
2019	"The Unfortunate Gent"	–	–	–	TEN
2019	"So Long"	–	–	–	TEN

=== As featured artist ===
Year	Single	Peak chart positions		Album
Year	Single	UK	IRE	Album
2010	"I Need You Tonight" (Professor Green featuring Ed Drewett)	3	15	Alive Till I'm Dead
2012	"Never Be a Right Time" (Professor Green featuring Ed Drewett)	35	–	At Your Inconvenience
2018	"Life" (Katy Tiz featuring Ed Drewett)	–	–	Non-album single

=== Singles as songwriter ===
Year	Single	Peak chart positions		Album
Year	Single	UK	US	Album
2010	"All Time Low" by the Wanted	1	–	The Wanted
2011	"Glad You Came" by the Wanted	1	3	Battleground
2011	"Lightning" by the Wanted	2	–	Battleground
2013	"Dear Darlin'" by Olly Murs	5	–	Right Place Right Time
2013	"Best Song Ever" by One Direction	2	2	Midnight Memories
2013	"Half a Heart" by One Direction	–	–	Midnight Memories
2013	"Little White Lies" by One Direction	–	–	Midnight Memories
2014	"Steal My Girl" by One Direction	3	13	Four
2014	"Act My Age" by One Direction	–	–	Four
2015	"Black Magic" by Little Mix	1	68	Get Weird
2015	"Weird People" by Little Mix	78	–	Get Weird
2015	"Hey Angel" by One Direction	96	–	Made in the A.M.
2015	"End of the Day" by One Direction	73	–	Made in the A.M.
2015	"A.M." by One Direction	83	–	Made in the A.M.
2015	"History" by One Direction	6	65	Made in the A.M.
2015	"Cheater" by the Vamps	–	–	Wake Up
2016	"So Good" by Louisa Johnson	13	–	Non-album single
2016	"All Night" by SG Lewis	–	–	Yours EP
2016	"Holding Back" by SG Lewis	–	–	
2017	"Mama" by Jonas Blue	4	–	Jonas Blue: The Electronic Nature and Blue
2017	"On My Own" by Niall Horan	–	–	Flicker
2017	"Middle of the Night" by the Vamps & Martin Jensen	44	-	Night & Day
2018	"Magic'" by Craig David	–	–	The Time Is Now
2018	"Barcelona" by Max George	–	–	
2018	"Rise" by Jonas Blue	3	–	Blue
2018	"Polaroid" by Jonas Blue, Liam Payne & Lennon Stella	12	–	Blue & LP1
2018	"Friends" by Why Don't We	–	–	8 Letters
2019	"A.N.I.M.A.L" by John Newman	–	–	A.N.I.M.A.L EP
2019	"Til I Met You" by Max George	–	–	
2020	"Fearless" by Louis Tomlinson	–	–	Walls
2020	"My Last Breath" by James Newman	–	–	The Things We Do EP
2020	"Naughty List" by Liam Payne & Dixie D'Amelio	48	–	Non-album single
2022	"Follow Me" by Pabllo Vittar	–	–	
2022	"Deep Sown" by Alok, Ella Eyre	62	–	
2026	"Away With The Fairies" by LUNA	-	–	Fairy Pop
2026	"Mr. Know It All" by Teddy Swims	52	39	
