= The Want (DC band) =

American rock band

- Origin: Washington, D.C., USA
- Genres: Rock, psychobilly
- Years active: 1990–present
- Labels: Selling the Ranch Records; The Orchard (music label)
- Members: Damian Banaszak; Jack Stanton; Bob Stewart
- Website: Official Website

The Want is an American rock band from Washington, D.C.

== History ==
The Want formed in Washington D.C. in the early 1990s and began playing live shows in 1994. The Washington Post describes their music as “musically tough” with “satiric lyrical twists that are pretty dang funny on closer inspection.” Allmusic writer Steve Huey describes The Want as “influenced primarily by rockabilly-tinged L.A. punk bands like X and Social Distortion.” Washington City Paper music and film critic Mark Jenkins described The Want as “skillfully eclectic outfit.”

In April 1995 The Want released their first CD, "Too Much Stuff," on Selling the Ranch Records followed by "Texas" in 1998. The current lineup of The Want is guitarist Bob Stewart, bassist Jack Stanton, and drummer Damian Banaszak.

== Line-up ==
- Damian Banaszak - drums & vocals
- Jack Stanton - bass guitar & vocals
- Bob Stewart - guitar & vocals

== Discography ==
=== Albums ===
- Too Much Stuff (1995, The Orchard)
- Texas (1998, The Orchard)

=== Singles ===
- If It Weren't for Girls, There Would Be No Christmas (2011), Selling the Ranch Records

=== Compilation appearances ===
- "Plunge - Local Music Store Compilation Volume IV" featured The Want's single "Lifetime Exposure"
