= Colloquium on Violence & Religion =

The Colloquium on Violence and Religion (COV&R) is an international organization dedicated to “exploring, critiquing, and developing” the mimetic theory proposed by the French historian, literary critic, and anthropological philosopher René Girard. Membership includes scholars of theology, religious studies, literary studies, philosophy, psychology, and other academic fields as well as clergy and other practitioners.

Girard's work focused on the sources of human violence in mimetic (unconsciously imitative) desire and the centrality of religion in the formation of culture through the management of violence (the single-victim mechanism or scapegoat effect), but the scope of the Colloquium on Violence & Religion's interest has expanded beyond violence to mimetic desire's positive potential and beyond religion to other disciplines.

COV&R does not endorse a political party or agenda, nor serve as an NGO or political action group, nor espouse a religious affiliation. The Colloquium on Violence & Religion is affiliated with regional organizations around the world devoted to Girard's work, mimetic theory, and peacemaking.

== History ==
The Colloquium on Violence and Religion is the oldest international organization dedicated to exploring mimetic theory.

COV&R was founded by James Williams, Charles Mabee, and Robert Hamerton-Kelly at Stanford University in March 1990 with the intent to start, as Williams tells the story in Williams' book Girardians: The Colloquium on Violence and Religion, 1990-2010, “a new group dedicated to hermeneutics and culture criticism revolving around the mimetic scapegoat theory.”

The group’s initial name was the Colloquium on Violence and Religion and Society, but this was shortened to the Colloquium on Violence and Religion, or COV&R. The objective of COV&R is “To explore, criticize, and develop the mimetic model of the relationship between violence and religion in the genesis and maintenance of culture.”

The make-up of COV&R’s board of directors from the start has represented its objective to welcome “scholars from various fields and diverse theoretical orientations” and followed a pattern of including members from throughout Europe and North America as well as, later, Japan, South America, Australia, and New Zealand.

Raymund Schwager, a theologian from the University of Innsbruck who was the first to apply mimetic theory to systematic interpretation of the Bible and became a close friend and dialogue partner of Girard, accepted the invitation to become COV&R’s first president. Williams, of Syracuse University, served as its first executive secretary; Gil Bailie, of the Florilegia Institute (now the Cornerstone Forum), was its first treasurer; and Wolfgang Palaver, also from the University of Innsbruck, was the first editor of the COV&R Bulletin. Girard himself accepted the title of honorary chair of the board of directors, though he never took on an executive or leadership role.

At its founding, the group agreed to convene in November, 1990, during the annual meeting of the American Academy of Religion and Society of Biblical Literature, the primary academic guild for many of its original members, and on its own again the next year. This rhythm continued, with COV&R organizing its own sessions at the annual meeting of the AAR in November and hosting its own annual conference in the summer.

== Award ==
Since 2005, COV&R has given the Raymund Schwager Memorial Award to honor its first president by recognizing the three best papers presented by graduate students at its annual meeting.

== Publications ==
The COV&R Bulletin, published two to four times a year since its founding, features event announcements and reports, book reviews, news of interest to members, commentary on current events, and bibliographies of scholarship on mimetic theory. The bibliographies are now also incorporated into the Index Theologicus database.

In 1994, COV&R founded an annual scholarly journal, Contagion: Journal of Violence, Mimesis, and Culture, under the leadership of Judith Arias. The editor’s introduction to the first issue, stated that “Contagion will reflect that diversity of interests as it explores the possibility of a non-rivalistic desire for meaningful knowledge about human relations.” Contagion is currently published by Michigan State University Press (ISSN 1930-1200) along with two book series, Studies in Violence, Mimesis, and Culture and Breakthroughs in Mimetic Theory, all under the editorial direction of William Johnsen. COV&R members receive access to Contagion and discounts on many of these books.

Colloquium on Violence & Religion also publishes a quarterly online newsletter, The Bulletin of the Colloquium on Violence and Religion.

A complete bibliography is included in the fully searchable Index Theologicus database.

== Annual meeting ==
After three annual conferences at Stanford, COV&R shifted to meeting at locations around the world and rotates between Europe, North America, and other continents. COV&R members are also involved in organizing more local gatherings, particularly through long-standing groups in the Netherlands, Austria, France, Spain, and Australia.

Colloquium on Violence & Religion holds an annual summer meeting, usually in July. It also meets in conjunction with the annual meeting of the American Academy of Religion in November.

The annual conference has themes, for example, Ethnocentrism and the Study of Violence, Literature and the Sacred, and Mimetic Theory and the History of Philosophy. Besides academic lectures and panels, annual meetings have featured practical workshops in order to fulfill COV&R’s objective to “be concerned with questions of both research and application.”

== Presidents ==
- 1991–1995: Raymund Schwager
- 1995–1999: Cesário Bandera
- 1999–2003: Diana Culbertson
- 2003–2007: Sandor Goodhart
- 2007–2011: Wolfgang Palaver (de)
- 2011–2015: Ann W. Astell
- 2015–2019: Jeremiah Alberg
- 2019–2023: Martha Reineke
- 2023–present: Nikolaus Wandinger
