= Want (surname) =

Want is an English surname shared by several people:

- Becky Want, English radio and television personality
- Jack Want (John Henry Want, 1846–1905), Australian barrister and politician
- Randolph Want (1811–1869), his father, Australian politician and shale miner
- Richard Want (fl. 1692–1696), pirate active in the Indian Ocean
- Tony Want (Anthony George Want, born 1948), English and US soccer footballer
