= All Time Low (The Wanted song) =

2010 single by The Wanted

Single by the Wanted

from the album The Wanted and The Wanted: The EP
- B-side: "Fight for This Love"
- Released: 25 July 2010
- Recorded: Rokstone (London, United Kingdom)
- Genre: Dance-pop
- Length: 3:23
- Label: Geffen; Def Jam
- Songwriters: Steve Mac; Wayne Hector; Ed Drewett
- Producer: Steve Mac

The Wanted singles chronology
"All Time Low" (2010)	"Heart Vacancy" (2010)

The Wanted US singles chronology
"All Time Low" (2011)	"Glad You Came" (2011)

Alternative cover
- U.S. cover

Music video
- "All Time Low" on YouTube

"All Time Low" is a song by British-Irish boy band the Wanted, written by Steve Mac, Wayne Hector and Ed Drewett. It was released on 25 July 2010 as the debut single from their self-titled debut album The Wanted, via Geffen Records. The song peaked at number one on the UK Singles Chart and number 19 in Ireland. "All Time Low" is upbeat with prominent dance-pop musical characteristics. It has so far garnered a positive response from contemporary music critics.

The song was accompanied by a music video which was released on 3 June 2010. The Wanted have performed "All Time Low" live at the Summertime Ball, Arqiva Awards, and on various television shows including: GMTV and The Hollyoaks Music Show, and online shows such as SBTV and The 5:19 Show. On 2 July 2010, BBC online magazine Slink used "All Time Low" in their 'Snapped' feature. "All Time Low" was also released as the band's debut single in the United States on 1 July 2011, also becoming the lead single from the group's debut stateside release, extended play The Wanted.

== Background and release ==
After forming and being signed to Geffen Records in 2010 through mass auditioning, the Wanted recorded "All Time Low". It was one of six songs recorded by the band at the time for their debut album due for release in late 2010. The track was co-written by its producer Steve Mac in collaboration with Wayne Hector and Ed Drewett. It was mixed by Dann Pursey and Ren Swan. Lyrically, "All Time Low" is written in reference to rising from the difficulty of having someone special constantly on your mind. Speaking to Orange UK, Max George interpreted what the song was about: "It's basically about a girl you can't get out of your mind - whatever you do, you just can't - and it describes how to get up from this all time low." Orange UK described "All Time Low" as having a "lovesick" theme to it. The lines "Waiting at the station/I'm late for work, a vital presentation" were said to take reference to Microsoft PowerPoint by music website Popjustice, while the line "I'm in pieces, seems like peace is the only thing I'll never know" was highlighted by Fraser McAlpine of the BBC as being the most memorable in the song in addition to having a devilish internal rhyme. "All Time Low" acts as the Wanted's debut single and first single from their debut album.

The single was first released on digital download format in Ireland and the United Kingdom on 25 July 2010. The following day, "All Time Low" was released on CD single format in both countries on 26 July 2010. In August 2010, they performed the song in Hannover, Germany at the Dome 55. On 11 September 2010, they performed the song at the Freedom Festival in Hull alongside "Heart Vacancy" and "Lose My Mind". In the United States, the single was released on 1 July 2011, however, it did not achieve any form of commercial success in the country. However, it did peaked within the top 20 of the Billboard Dance Club Songs chart.

== Critical reception ==
"All Time Low" received critical praise from Ryan Love of Digital Spy who gave the song a four out of five star rating. The song was performed on Channel 4 on 15 August 2010. Love described the song as "a bit of a surprise" and gave praise to its opening "quite simply immense" strings. Love went on to call the song a "fresh 'n' fizzy indie-tinged pop gem". "All Time Low" received its second four out of five star rating after a review by Fraser McAlpine from the BBC. McAlpine reviewed the track mentioning: "Now, for a transparent piece of silly old pop music, this has class cooties. The telltale signs are there in the string riff, and the mature, subtle way they approach the singing, and the restraint with which they have applied the autotune." He went on to say that the song was good despite sampling a melody from Coldplay's "The Scientist" (2002). McAlpine added that the song boasts a memorable line with a devilish internal rhyme: "I'm in pieces, it seems like peace is the only thing I'll never know".

== Chart performance ==
"All Time Low" entered at the top of the UK Singles Chart on 1 August 2010 – for the week ending dated 7 August 2010 – with first-week sales of 84,174 copies. It became their first number one single on the chart. In Ireland, the single peaked at number 13 on the Irish Singles Chart. In the United States, "All Time Low" peaked at number 19 on the Billboard Dance Club Songs chart.

== Track listings ==
- UK digital single number one
1. "All Time Low" – 3:23
2. "All Time Low" (D.O.N.S. Remix Radio Edit) – 3:39
- UK digital single number two
1. "All Time Low" (ForGold Remix) – 4:59
2. "All Time Low" (Daddy's Groove Remix) – 6:57
- UK CD single
1. "All Time Low" – 3:23
2. "Fight for This Love" – 3:26
- U.S. digital single
1. "All Time Low" (Single Mix) – 3:22
- U.S. digital remix EP
1. "All Time Low" (Single Mix) – 3:22
2. "All Time Low" (Ralphi Rosario Radio Mix) – 3:44
3. "All Time Low" (Digital Dog Radio Edit) – 3:18
4. "All Time Low" (Single Club Mix) – 6:27
5. "All Time Low" (Ralphi Rosario Club Mix) – 8:01
6. "All Time Low" (Digital Dog Club Remix) – 6:02
7. "All Time Low" (Single Dub Mix) – 6:27
8. "All Time Low" (Ralphi Rosario Dub Mix) – 6:58
9. "All Time Low" (Digital Dog Dub Remix) – 6:17
- U.S. promotional CD single
1. "All Time Low" (Digital Dog Radio Edit) – 3:18
2. "All Time Low" (Digital Dog Club Remix) – 6:02
3. "All Time Low" (Frank E Radio Edit) – 4:14
4. "All Time Low" (Frank E Remix) – 7:22
5. "All Time Low" (D.O.N.S. Radio Edit) – 3:40
6. "All Time Low" (D.O.N.S. Club Remix) – 7:44
7. "All Time Low" (Ralphi Rosario Club Mix) – 8:01
8. "All Time Low" (Ralphi Rosario Dub Mix) – 6:58
9. "All Time Low" (Daddy's Groove Remix) – 7:24
10. "All Time Low" (ForGold Remix) – 4:47
- U.S. digital live EP
1. "All Time Low" (Live) – 4:57
2. "Glad You Came" (Live) – 3:20
3. "Gold Forever" (Live) – 4:24
4. "Heart Vacancy" (Live) – 4:25
5. "Animal" (Live) – 2:38
6. "Lose My Mind" (Live) – 4:13

== Personnel ==
- Vocals – Tom Parker, Nathan Sykes, Jay McGuiness, Max George, Siva Kaneswaran
- Guitar – Dann Pursey
- Drums – Chris Laws
- Production, arrangement, keyboards, bass and strings arrangement – Steve Mac
- Songwriting – Steve Mac, Wayne Hector, Ed Drewett
- Engineering – Chris Laws, Dann Pursey
- Mixing – Ren Swan, Dann Pursey
- Mastering – Dick Beetham

== Charts ==
=== Weekly charts ===
Chart (2010–2011)	Peak position
Europe (European Hot 100 Singles)	6
Germany (GfK)	44
Ireland (IRMA)	13
Scottish Singles Sales (Official Charts)	1
UK Singles (Official Charts)	1
UK Airplay (Music Week)	8
US Dance Club Songs (Billboard)	19

=== Year-end charts ===
Chart (2010)	Position
UK Singles (OCC)	36
UK Airplay (Music Week)	21

== Certifications ==
Region	Certification	Certified units/sales
United Kingdom (BPI)	Platinum	600,000^{‡}
^{‡} Sales+streaming figures based on certification alone.

== Release history ==
Region	Date	Format	Label
United Kingdom; Ireland	25 July 2010	Digital download	Geffen
United Kingdom; Ireland	26 July 2010	CD single	Geffen
Germany	9 August 2010	Digital download	Geffen
Germany	22 October 2010	CD single	Geffen
Canada	1 July 2011	Digital download	Def Jam
United States	1 July 2011	Digital download	Def Jam
United States	30 April 2013	Mainstream radio	Def Jam

== See also ==
- List of UK Singles Chart number ones of the 2010s
