= The Wanted (album) =

Studio album by the Wanted
- Released: 22 October 2010
- Recorded: 2009–2010
- Genres: Pop; dance-pop
- Length: 45:18
- Label: Geffen
- Producers: Steve Mac; Jonas Jeberg; Cutfather; Greg Kurstin; Phat Fabe; Guy Chambers; Richard Flack; Dreamlab; Jamie Hartman; Harry Sommerdahl; Chris Young; Katelyn Welch; Ashley Brooks

The Wanted chronology
The Wanted (2010)	Battleground (2011)

Singles from The Wanted
- 1. "All Time Low" Released: 25 July 2010; 2. "Heart Vacancy" Released: 17 October 2010; 3. "Lose My Mind" Released: 26 December 2010

The Wanted is the debut studio album by British-Irish boy band the Wanted, released on 22 October 2010 through Geffen Records. The majority of the album was written by members of the band, with help from songwriters Steve Mac, Wayne Hector, Ed Drewett, Lucas Secon, Lukas Hilbert and Alexander Kronlund. The album was available in multiple editions, including a deluxe edition exclusive to Tesco, which contained two bonus remixes and two videos, and individual band member editions, exclusive to HMV, which featured a bonus slipcase and liner notes related to the respective band member. The album debuted at number four on the UK Albums Chart, and at number eleven in Ireland. The album produced three singles which attained UK chart success, including the number-one single "All Time Low".

== Singles ==
"All Time Low" was released on 25 July 2010, as the group's debut single. It debuted at number one on the UK Singles Chart. In Ireland, the track peaked at number 13, after four weeks on the chart. Internationally, "All Time Low" was released on 22 October 2010 in Germany, peaking at number 44, and on 1 July 2011 in the United States, peaking at number 19 on the Billboard Hot Club Dance Songs Chart. Its official video currently has over 22 million views on YouTube.

"Heart Vacancy" was released on 17 October 2010, as the group's second single. It peaked at number two on the UK Singles Chart. The track became the band's second top twenty single in Ireland, peaking at number 18. Its video currently has more than ten million views on YouTube. "Heart Vacancy" is currently the band's only single not to be released internationally.

"Lose My Mind" was released on 26 December 2010, as the group's third single. It peaked at number 19 on the UK Singles Chart, but only managed to peak at number 30 in Ireland. The low chart positions may have been caused by the single's release date being brought forward from 13 January 2011 to 26 December 2010. The single was also released in Germany on 4 March 2011, where it peaked at number 36, and it was released in the United States on 31 August 2012, becoming the band's fourth single there. Its video currently has over six million views on YouTube.

== Reception ==
Professional ratings
Review scores
Source	Rating
AllMusic	4/5 stars
4Music	4/5 stars
BBC Music	(favourable)
CityLife	3/5 stars
Heat	4/5 stars
The Independent	(positive)
Music Week	(favourable)
Shields Gazette	1/10
USA Today	3/4 stars
Virgin Media	3/5 stars

Music Week gave the album a favourable review stating, "This eponymous album sounds like the kind of radio friendly, polished buy playful, and melody-packed album a pop act should make in 2010. It has its moments of innovation – like the vaguely menacing sub bass of 'Say It on the Radio' or the spaghetti western stylings of 'Let's Get Ugly' – but both songs soon resolve into massive choruses that will sounds great coming out of your radios and TVs." Heat's Karen Edwards rated the album four out of five, saying "The boys switch lead vocal duties throughout, and from indie ballad 'Golden', the sweet pop sounds of 'Heart Vacancy' and the Kings of Leon-inspired 'Lose My Mind' [...] to the cheeky Midwest style of 'Let's Get Ugly', there are plenty of different sounds to enjoy. [...] There's something for everyone on The Wanted – not just for the teenie-boppers among us." Fraser McAlpine of BBC Music felt the album had plenty of highs and lows, and stated, "There are signs of pop evolution at work within the genes of this lot. [...] Arresting songs, with masses of personality – like the swoony, choral [Hi &] Low, or the downright Wild Beasts-y Golden – sit next to the formulaic (but y’know, fine) Say It on the Radio or Personal Soldier: the very acme of nothing ventured, nothing gained."

Paul Taylor of CityLife said the album is hardly full of surprises and wrote, "Working with Scanda-pop producers Cutfather and Carl Falk and the likes of Steve Mac and Guy Chambers yields a very particular brand of big glossy pop, which manages to sprinkle in a little teen indie spirit as well as a helping of Taio Cruz-style electro. There is, inevitably, a bit of an Eighties feel there." In his review for The Independent, Simon Price wrote: "Their front-loaded debut, penned by the A-list of pop songwriters (Cathy Dennis, Guy Chambers, Taio Cruz), covers all boy band bases, from the Coldplay-meets-Akon smash "All Time Low" to Westlife-esque ballad "Heart Vacancy" and will sell by the truckload to girls who find JLS too scarily urban." 4Music gave the album four out of five stars describing it as "the complete opposite of what we're using to hearing from boybands. [...] there's a few 'lighters in the air' moments, but for the most part it's up-tempo, catchy and [...] credible pop music that you shouldn't feel ashamed for liking." Virgin Media's Ian Gittins gave the album three out of five stars and said the album appealed to "pre-teens and tweenies", and concluded: "No matter how accomplished the packaging, they could not do this if the songs were not in place, and slick confections such as Replace My Heart and Weakness hint that they have located a lucrative musical niche somewhere between JLS and early Justin Timberlake. [...] This is a polished, efficient album of ultra-contemporary pop and R&B, with only the Ennio Morricone-sampling Let's Get Ugly misjudging the cheese levels."

== Tour ==
The Wanted toured the UK in March and April 2011 in support of the album. The band's support acts were Lawson, Twenty Twenty and Starboy Nathan.

Date	City	Country	Venue
Behind Bars Tour:
26 March 2011	Rhyl	Wales	Pavilion Theatre
28 March 2011	Manchester	England	O_{2} Apollo Manchester
29 March 2011	Manchester	England	O_{2} Apollo Manchester
30 March 2011	Newcastle	England	Newcastle City Hall
1 April 2011	Brighton	England	Brighton Centre
2 April 2011	Nottingham	England	Nottingham Royal Concert Hall
3 April 2011	Cardiff	Wales	Cardiff International Arena
5 April 2011	Plymouth	England	Plymouth Pavilions
6 April 2011	London	England	Hammersmith Apollo
7 April 2011	London	England	Hammersmith Apollo
9 April 2011	Bournemouth	England	Bournemouth International Centre
10 April 2011	Sheffield	England	Sheffield City Hall
11 April 2011	Wolverhampton	England	Wolverhampton Civic Hall
13 April 2011	Glasgow	Scotland	Clyde Auditorium
14 April 2011	Glasgow	Scotland	Clyde Auditorium
15 April 2011	Edinburgh	Scotland	Edinburgh Playhouse
14 May 2011	Doncaster	England	Doncaster Racecourse
21 May 2011	Newbury	England	Newbury Racecourse
29 May 2011	Gloucester	England	Kingsholm Stadium
25 June 2011 (Note: This concert was part of Live at the Beach.)	Portrush	Northern Ireland	East Strand Car Park
2 July 2011 (Note: This concert was part of Chester Rocks.)	Chester	England	Chester Racecourse
16 July 2011 (Note: This concert was part of Live at Hanley Park.)	Stoke-on-Trent	England	Hanley Park
17 July 2011 (Note: This concert was part of Live at the Castle.)	Kent	England	Leeds Castle
21 July 2011 (Note: This concert was part of Epson Live.)	Epsom	England	Epsom Downs Racecourse
22 July 2011	Hamilton	Scotland	Hamilton Park Racecourse
23 July 2011 (Note: This concert was part of Ponty's Big Weekend.)	Pontypridd	Wales	Ponty Park
29 July 2011 (Note: This concert was part of Newmarket Nights.)	Newmarket	England	Newmarket Racecourse

Setlist:

1. "Behind Bars"
2. "Lose My Mind"
3. "Weakness"
4. "Personal Soldier"
5. "Let's Get Ugly"
6. "A Good Day For Love To Die"
7. "Hi & Low"
8. "Golden"
9. "Animal" (Neon Trees cover)
10. "Iris" (Goo Goo Dolls cover)
11. "Heart Vacancy"
12. "Say It On The Radio"
13. "Medley:"
  1. "Dynamite
  2. "Higher"
  3. "Dirty Picture"
  4. "Made"
  5. "Break Your Heart"
14. "Replace Your Heart"
15. "Gold Forever"
16. "All Time Low"

== Track listing ==
No.	Title	Writer(s)	Producer(s)	Length
1.	"All Time Low"	Steve Mac; Wayne Hector; Ed Drewett	Mac	3:25
2.	"Heart Vacancy"	Mich Hansen; Jonas Jeberg; Lucas Secon; Hector	Jeberg; Cutfather	3:44
3.	"Lose My Mind"	Nina Woodford; Rami Yacoub; Carl Falk	Rami; Falk; The Wideboys	3:50
4.	"Replace Your Heart"	Cathy Dennis; Greg Kurstin; Kasia Livingston	Kurstin	4:07
5.	"Hi & Low"	Greg Laswell	Phat Fabe	3:41
6.	"Let's Get Ugly"	Ennio Morricone; Guy Chambers; Mc. Stagger	Chambers; Richard Flack	3:31
7.	"Say It on the Radio"	Max A. George; Nathan Sykes; Siva Kaneswaran; Tom Parker; Jay McGuiness; Daniel James; Leah Haywood	Dreamlab	3:18
8.	"Golden"	George; Sykes; Kaneswaran; Parker; McGuiness; Jamie Hartman	Hartman	2:56
9.	"Weakness"	George; Sykes; Kaneswaran; Parker; McGuiness; Woodford; Harry Sommerdahl; Fabian Torsson	Phat Fabe; Sommerdahl	3:56
10.	"Personal Soldier"	Chambers; Steph Jones	Chambers; Richard Flack	3:48
11.	"Behind Bars"	George; Sykes; Kaneswaran; Parker; McGuiness; Chris Young	Chris Young	3:01
12.	"Made"	Chambers; Taio Cruz	Chambers; Flack	3:22
13.	"A Good Day for Love to Die"	George; Sykes; Kaneswaran; Parker; McGuiness; Hansen; Sharon Vaughn; Marcus John Bryant	Jeberg; Cutfather	3:32

iTunes Deluxe edition
No.	Title	Writer(s)	Producer(s)	Length
14.	"The Way I Feel"	Chambers; Flack	Chambers; Flack	3:26
15.	"All Time Low" (Digital Dog club remix)	Mac; Hector; Drewett	Mac	6:04
16.	"Heart Vacancy" (DJs from Mars remix)	Hansen; Jeberg; Secon; Wayne Hector	Jeberg; Cutfather	6:15

Tesco Limited Edition
No.	Title	Writer(s)	Producer(s)	Length
14.	"All Time Low" (Digital Dog club remix)	Mac; Hector; Drewett	Mac	6:04
15.	"Heart Vacancy" (DJs from Mars remix)	Hansen; Jeberg; Secon; Wayne Hector	Jeberg; Cutfather	6:15

== Charts and certifications ==
=== Weekly charts ===
Chart (2010)	Peak position
European Top 100 Albums	15
Irish Albums (IRMA)	11
Scottish Albums (OCC)	4
UK Albums (OCC)	4
Chart (2012)	Peak position
Canadian Albums (Billboard)	8
New Zealand Albums (RMNZ)	40
US Billboard 200	7
Chart (2013)	Peak position
Japanese Albums (Oricon)	28

=== Year-end charts ===
Chart (2010)	Position
UK Albums (OCC)	41
Chart (2011)	Position
UK Albums (OCC)	64
Chart (2012)	Position
US Billboard 200	194

=== Certifications ===
Region	Certification	Certified units/sales
United Kingdom (BPI)	Platinum	300,000^{*}
^{*} Sales figures based on certification alone.

== Release history ==
Region	Date	Format	Label
Ireland	22 October 2010	CD; digital download	Geffen
United Kingdom	25 October 2010	CD; digital download	Geffen
Germany	11 March 2011	CD; digital download	Geffen
