= The Wanted discography =

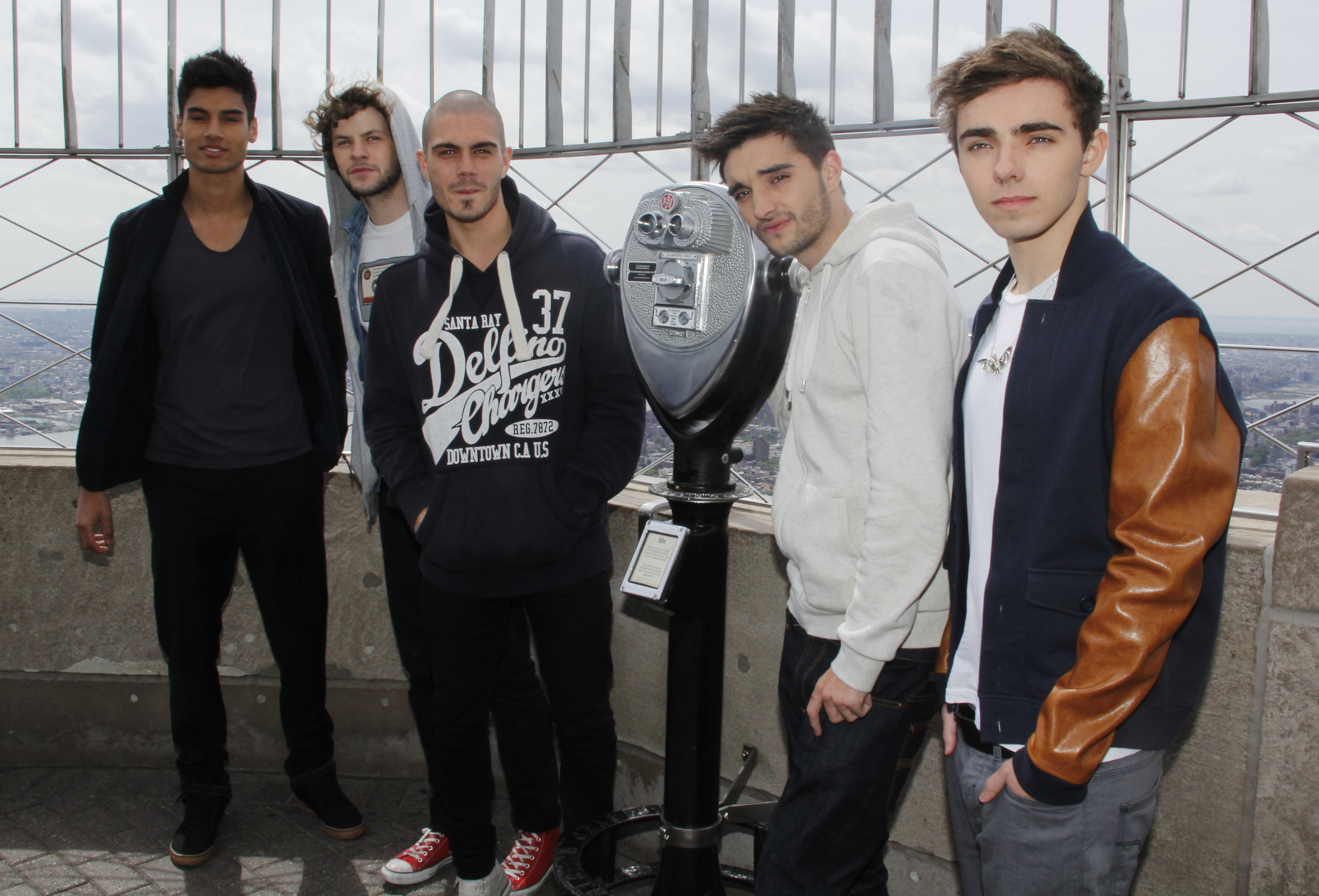
- The Wanted on the Empire State Building Observation Deck, 2012
- Studio albums: 3
- Extended plays: 2
- Compilation albums: 1
- Singles: 15
- Music videos: 17

British-Irish vocal pop group The Wanted have released three studio albums, one compilation album, two extended plays and fifteen singles. The band's debut album, The Wanted, was released by Geffen Records in the United Kingdom in October 2010. It reached number four on the UK Album Chart and number eleven on the Irish Albums Chart. The album's first single, "All Time Low", was released in July 2010 and peaked at number one on the UK Singles Chart and number thirteen on the Irish Singles Chart. This was followed by "Heart Vacancy", which reached two in the UK and eighteen in Ireland. "Lose My Mind", was the third and last single from the album and was less successful than its predecessors, reaching number 19 in the UK and number 30 in Ireland.

In March 2011, The Wanted released the official 2011 Comic Relief charity single, "Gold Forever", which peaked at number three in the UK and number 13 in Ireland. "Glad You Came", the Wanted's fifth single, was released in July 2011 and became their second number-one single in the UK and their first in Ireland; it also charted in the US, Australia, and Europe. In October, their sixth single, "Lightning", debuted and peaked at number 2 on 23 October 2011. This was followed by second album Battleground, which got to number 5.

In 2012, the band released "Chasing the Sun", the lead single from their then-untitled third studio album and the theme song of the animated film Ice Age: Continental Drift (2012). Four further singles were released, including top 5 hits "I Found You" and "Walks Like Rihanna", before long-awaited third album Word of Mouth finally dropped in November 2013. After the album only reached number 9 in the UK and number 17 in the US, the band announced an indefinite hiatus.

The band reunited in September 2021 and released their first greatest hits album in November 2021, which included two new songs.

== Albums ==
=== Studio albums ===
Title	Album details	Peak chart positions								Certifications	Sales
Title	Album details	UK	AUS	FRA	IRE	NL	NZ	SPA	US	Certifications	Sales
The Wanted	Released: 22 October 2010; Label: Geffen; Format: CD, digital download	4	—	—	11	—	40	—	—	BPI: Platinum	UK: 300,000
Battleground	Released: 1 November 2011; Label: Island; Format: CD, digital download	5	—	129	4	—	—	56	—	BPI: Platinum; IRMA: Gold; RMNZ: Gold	UK: 300,000; IRE: 7,500; NZ: 7,500^{‡}
Word of Mouth	Released: 4 November 2013; Label: Island; Format: CD, digital download	9	64	151	10	70	23	31	17	BPI: Gold	UK: 100,000^{‡}; MEX: 60,000
"—" denotes an album that did not chart or was not released in that territory.

=== Compilation albums ===
List of compilation albums, with selected details
Title	Details	Peak chart positions		Certifications	Sales
Title	Details	UK	IRE	Certifications	Sales
Most Wanted: The Greatest Hits	Released: 12 November 2021; Label: Island; Format: CD, cassette, digital download, streaming	8	37	BPI: Silver	UK: 60,000^{‡}

== Extended plays ==
Title	EP details	Peak chart positions	
Title	EP details	US	CAN
iTunes Festival: London 2011	Released: 21 July 2011; Label: Island; Format: Digital download	—	—
The Wanted: The EP	Released: 24 April 2012; Label: Mercury; Format: CD, digital download	7	8
"—" denotes an album that did not chart or was not released in that territory.

== Singles ==
=== As lead artists ===
Title	Year	Peak chart positions									Certifications	Album
Title	Year	UK	AUS	CAN	GER	IRE	NL	NZ	SPA	US	Certifications	Album
"All Time Low"	2010	1	—	—	44	13	—	—	—	—	BPI: Platinum	The Wanted
"Heart Vacancy"	2010	2	—	—	—	18	—	—	—	—	BPI: Silver	The Wanted
"Lose My Mind"	2010	19	—	—	—	30	—	—	—	—		The Wanted
"Gold Forever"	2011	3	—	86	—	13	—	—	—	—	BPI: Silver	Battleground
"Glad You Came"	2011	1	20	2	—	1	31	13	34	3	BPI: 2× Platinum; ARIA: Platinum; MC: 5× Platinum; PROMUSICAE: Gold; RIAA: 3× Platinum; RMNZ: 2× Platinum	Battleground
"Lightning"	2011	2	79	84	—	5	—	23	—	—	BPI: Silver	Battleground
"Warzone"	2011	21	—	—	—	27	—	—	—	—		Battleground
"Chasing the Sun"	2012	2	18	18	17	4	—	18	33	50	BPI: Gold; ARIA: Platinum; BVMI: Gold; MC: Platinum; RIAA: Gold; RMNZ: Gold	The Wanted: The EP
"I Found You"	2012	3	63	50	—	8	—	—	—	89	MC: Gold	Word of Mouth
"Walks Like Rihanna"	2013	4	32	—	54	3	35	—	27	—	BPI: Gold	Word of Mouth
"We Own the Night"	2013	10	40	51	—	13	—	—	—	94	BPI: Silver	Word of Mouth
"Show Me Love (America)"	2013	8	—	—	—	18	—	—	—	—		Word of Mouth
"Glow in the Dark"	2014	177	—	—	—	—	—	—	—	—		Word of Mouth
"Rule the World"	2021	24	—	—	—	—	—	—	—	—		Most Wanted: The Greatest Hits
"—" denotes a single that did not chart or was not released in that territory.

=== Promotional singles ===
Title	Year	Peak chart position	Album
Title	Year	UK	Album
"Could This Be Love"	2013	77	Word of Mouth
"Stay Another Day"	2021	—	Most Wanted: The Greatest Hits
"Gold Forever (For Tom)"	2022	—	Non-album single

== Other charted songs ==
Song	Year	Peak chart position	Album
Song	Year	UK	Album
"Replace Your Heart"	2010	156	The Wanted
"Drunk on Love"	2013	147	Word of Mouth

== Other appearances ==
Songs	Year	Album
"Bring It Home" (Dappy featuring The Wanted)	2012	Bad Intentions
"Have Some Fun" (Pitbull featuring The Wanted and Afrojack)	2012	Global Warming

== Music videos ==
Title	Year	Director(s)
"All Time Low"	2010	Max and Diana
"Heart Vacancy"	2010	Max and Diana
"Lose My Mind"	2010	Nigel Dick
"Gold Forever"	2011	Nigel Dick
"Glad You Came"	2011	Director X
"Lightning"	2011	Director X
"Warzone"	2011	Director X
"Chasing the Sun"	2012	Director X
"Chasing the Sun (Ice Age: Continental Drift Version)"	2012	Director X
"I Found You"	2012	Chris Marrs Piliero
"I Found You (fan version)"	2013	Chris Marrs Piliero
"All Time Low (The Live Experience)"	2013	Global Talent Records
"Walks Like Rihanna"	2013	Shane Drake
"We Own the Night"	2013	Frank Borin
"Show Me Love (America)"	2013	Frank Borin
"Glow in the Dark"	2014	Global Talent Records
"Rule the World"	2021	
"Stay Another Day"	2021	
