= Most Wanted: The Greatest Hits =

Greatest hits album by the Wanted
- Released: 12 November 2021
- Length: 51:51
- Label: Island

The Wanted chronology
Word of Mouth (2013)	Most Wanted: The Greatest Hits (2021)

Singles from Most Wanted: The Greatest Hits
- 1. "Rule the World" Released: 13 October 2021

Most Wanted: The Greatest Hits is the first greatest hits album by British-Irish boy band the Wanted, released on 12 November 2021 by Island Records. It marks their first release in eight years, following the band going on hiatus after the release of their third studio album Word of Mouth (2013). The album was supported by its lead single "Rule the World".

The standard edition of the album contains 15 tracks, including their UK number ones "All Time Low" and "Glad You Came", all the group's singles (with the exception of "Glow in the Dark"), "Could This Be Love", an album track from Word of Mouth and the group's most streamed non-single, and two new tracks. The deluxe edition contains five newly recorded acoustic versions of songs off the album, including a cover of "Remember" by Becky Hill and David Guetta, while the extended deluxe contains a cover of "Stay Another Day" by East 17, and an alternative edit and the Shane Codd remix of "Rule the World".

To promote the album, the group performed on Good Morning America and toured the UK in March 2022, with English singer and television presenter Hrvy serving as the opening act. Most Wanted was the group's final album to feature Tom Parker, who died in 2022.

== Background and release ==
The Wanted released their third studio album Word of Mouth (2013). The album received mixed reviews from music critics, and performed moderately on charts, peaking at 9 on the UK Albums Chart and 17 on the US Billboard 200. The album was supported by their Word of Mouth World Tour, their debut concert tour in 2014. Before the tour began, the band announced on their website that they'll be taking a break following the tour.

On 8 September 2021, after seven years of their hiatus, The Wanted reunited after releasing a new "Wanted Wednesday" episode, and later announced the album. They originally planned to reunite to celebrate their 10th anniversary in 2020, however, it was delayed due to the COVID-19 pandemic, and band member Tom Parker's brain tumor diagnosis in August 2020.

== Promotion ==
=== Singles ===
On 7 October 2021, The band announced the album's lead single "Rule the World" would be released on 13 October 2021 at 8 am BST, with a music video was released on the same day. Following its release, the song charted at 24 on the UK Singles Downloads Chart.

=== Promotional singles ===
An acoustic cover of "Remember" by Becky Hill and David Guetta was released as the first promotional single off the album. "Colours" was released on 10 November 2021 as the second promotional single off the album, with a lyric video released on the same day. A cover of "Stay Another Day" by East 17 was released as the third promotional single off the album.

=== Tour ===
Following the group's reunion announcement, the group announced they would tour the United Kingdom in March 2022 in support of the album, with tickets going up for sale on 17 September 2021. It was their first concert in seven years, following the Word of Mouth World Tour in 2014.

=== Other promotion ===
The group performed at group member Tom Parker's Inside My Head concert at the Royal Albert Hall on 20 September 2021, and also announced that they would perform some album live shows during the month on November.

== Tour ==
Date	City	Country	Venue
Most Wanted - The Greatest Hits Tour:
March 3, 2022	Glasgow	Scotland	SSE Hydro
March 4, 2022	Newcastle	England	Utilita Arena
March 5, 2022	Leeds	England	First Direct Arena
March 7, 2022	Bournemouth	England	Bournemouth International Centre
March 8, 2022	Brighton	England	Brighton Centre
March 9, 2022	Cardiff	Wales	Utilita Arena
March 11, 2022	Nottingham	England	Motorpoint Arena
March 12, 2022	Birmingham	England	Utilita Arena
March 13, 2022	Manchester	England	AO Arena
March 15, 2022	London	England	The O2 Arena
March 16, 2022	Hull	England	Bonus Arena
March 17, 2022	Liverpool	England	M&S Bank Arena
March 19, 2022	Belfast	Northern Ireland	SSE Arena
March 20, 2022	Dublin	Ireland	3Arena

== Track listing ==
Standard edition
No.	Title	Writer(s)	Producer(s)	Length
1.	"Rule the World" (previously unreleased)	Ari Leff; Michael Pollack; Jakob Hazell; Max George; Svante Halldin	Jack & Coke	3:17
2.	"Colours" (previously unreleased)	David Sneddon; Nathan Sykes; Paul Whalley	Paul Whalley	3:21
3.	"Glad You Came" (from Battleground, 2011)	Steve Mac; Wayne Hector; Ed Drewett	Mac	3:18
4.	"All Time Low" (from The Wanted, 2010)	Mac; Wayne Hector; Ed Drewett	Mac	3:25
5.	"Chasing the Sun" (from Ice Age: Continental Drift, 2012 and Word of Mouth, 2013)	Alex Smith; Elliot Gleave	Smith	3:15
6.	"Heart Vacancy" (from The Wanted)	Mich Hansen; Jonas Jeberg; Lucas Secon; Hector	Jeberg; Cutfather	3:44
7.	"Gold Forever" (from Battleground)	Mac; Hector; Claude Kelly	Mac	3:58
8.	"Lose My Mind" (from The Wanted)	Nina Woodford; Rami Yacoub; Carl Falk	Rami; Falk; The Wideboys	3:50
9.	"Lightning" (from Battleground)	Mac; Hector; Drewett	Mac	3:26
10.	"We Own the Night" (from Word of Mouth)	Nasri Atweh; Kyle Reed; Adam Messinger; Nolan Lambroza	Nasri; Messinger; Sir Nolan	3:25
11.	"I Found You" (from Word of Mouth)	Mac; Wayne Hector; Ina Wroldsen	Mac	4:00
12.	"Walks Like Rihanna" (from Word of Mouth)	Lukasz Gottwald; Henry Walter; Andy Hill; Michelsen; Førre Erfjord	Dr. Luke; Cirkut; Electric^{[a]}	3:22
13.	"Warzone" (from Battleground)	Jack MacManus; Harry Sommerdahl; George; Sykes	Sommerdahl	3:09
14.	"Show Me Love (America)" (from Word of Mouth)	Sykes; Tim Woodcock; Kasper Larsen; Ole Brodersen	Fraser T Smith	3:27
15.	"Could This Be Love" (from Word of Mouth)	George; McManus; Josh Wilkinson	Wilkinson	3:08
Total length:				51:51

Deluxe edition bonus tracks
No.	Title	Writer(s)	Producer(s)	Length
16.	"Rule the World" (acoustic)	Leff; Pollack; Hazell; George; Halldin	Jonas Jalhay	3:00
17.	"Glad You Came" (acoustic)	Mac; Hector; Drewett	Jalhay	3:00
18.	"We Own the Night" (acoustic)	Atweh; Reed; Messinger; Lambroza	Jalhay	2:54
19.	"Could This Be Love" (acoustic)	George; McManus; Wilkinson	Jalhay	3:18
20.	"Remember" (acoustic)	Becky Hill; David Guetta; Karen Ann Poole; Kye Elliot Sones; Lewis Thompson; Luke Storrs	Jalhay	2:39
Total length:				66:42

Extended deluxe edition bonus tracks
No.	Title	Writer(s)	Producer(s)	Length
21.	"Stay Another Day" (previously unreleased)	Tony Mortimer; Rob Kean; Dominic Hawken	Tim Powell; Jalhay	4:00
22.	"Rule the World" (alternative edit)	Leff; Pollack; Hazell; George; Halldin	Jack & Coke; Jalhay	3:03
23.	"Rule the World" (Shane Codd remix)	Leff; Pollack; Hazell; George; Halldin	Jack & Coke	2:37
Total length:				76:22

Notes

- Tracks 3–15 are noted as "2021 remaster".
- The vinyl version of the album excludes "Could This Be Love".
- The band member cassette versions of the album have "Rule the World" and "Colours" as tracks 14 and 15, respectively.

== Charts ==
Chart performance for Most Wanted: The Greatest Hits
Chart (2021)	Peak position
Irish Albums (Official Charts)	37
UK Albums (Official Charts)	8

== Certifications ==
Certifications for Most Wanted: The Greatest Hits
Region	Certification	Certified units/sales
United Kingdom (BPI)	Silver	60,000^{‡}
^{‡} Sales+streaming figures based on certification alone.
