= Word of Mouth (The Wanted album) =

Studio album by the Wanted
- Released: 4 November 2013
- Recorded: 2011–2013
- Genre: Pop
- Length: 48:28
- Label: Island
- Producers: Antonyo Smith; Adam Messinger; Nasri Atweh; Sir Nolan; Steve Mac; Dr. Luke; Cirkut; Electric; Ki Fitzgerald; Chris Young; Gary Clark; Fraser T Smith; Harry Sommerdahl; DEEKAY; Sonny J Mason; Jess Jackson

The Wanted chronology
The Wanted: The EP (2012)	Word of Mouth (2013)	Most Wanted: The Greatest Hits (2021)

Singles from Word of Mouth
- 1. "Chasing the Sun" Released: 17 April 2012; 2. "I Found You" Released: 4 November 2012; 3. "Walks Like Rihanna" Released: 10 May 2013; 4. "We Own the Night" Released: 11 August 2013; 5. "Show Me Love (America)" Released: 25 October 2013; 6. "Glow in the Dark" Released: 23 March 2014

Word of Mouth is the third studio album by English-Irish boy band the Wanted. The album was released worldwide via Island Records on 4 November 2013. The album was preceded by the release of six singles: "Chasing the Sun", "I Found You", "Walks Like Rihanna", "We Own the Night", "Show Me Love (America)" and "Glow in the Dark", the latter of which was released two weeks prior to the album. It was the last studio album to feature singer Tom Parker before his death in March 2022.

The album features production from a wide range of producers and was recorded over the course of two years, from 2011 to 2013. The Wanted toured the album with their first ever world tour, the Word of Mouth Tour, starting in February 2014.

== Background and development ==
The Wanted began working on recording new material in November 2011, shortly after the release of their second studio album, Battleground. The band confirmed that they had worked with a number of different producers and collaborators whilst writing the material, in order to make something that would appeal to both American and British audiences. It was initially rumoured that the material that they were recording would be for a repackaged version of Battleground, which would contain a total of seven tracks which failed to make the initial cut, plus two brand new recordings, but this idea was later dismissed by band members Max George and Siva Kaneswaran. It was later revealed that the band had recorded a duet with a "female mega-star", rumoured to be Rihanna and the track, rumoured to be titled "Jealousy" would appear on their next album. Despite this, the band said that after the song had been mixed, tuned and finalised, the final mix "didn't cut it", and as such, the song had been completely scrapped, and was not going to be released.

In March 2012, the Wanted premiered the first track from the recording sessions, a track entitled "Chasing the Sun", written by English singer and rapper Example. Later that month, they premiered another new track, "Satellite", co-written by OneRepublic's Ryan Tedder. Both tracks went on to appear on the band's self-titled debut EP release in the United States. It was soon revealed that they were in fact in the midst of recording their third studio album. In October 2012, shortly after the premiere of their new single, "I Found You", rumours circulated the internet that the album would be titled Third Strike, and a track list and artwork were also "revealed". The track list contained a number of tracks which failed to make the cut of Battleground, several new recordings, plus collaborations with the likes of Chris Brown on "Loverboy", Rita Ora on "Mastermind" and LMFAO on "The Club's on Fire", as well as appearances from Dappy and Pitbull on the deluxe edition. Dappy's collaboration, "Bring It All Home", appears on his debut album Bad Intentions and Pitbull's collaboration, "Have Some Fun", appears on his seventh album Global Warming. However, in one of the band's "Wanted Wednesday" videos, Nathan Sykes revealed that the title and artwork were both fake. The track listing was later revealed to be fake as well, including all the collaborations.

In February 2013, it was announced that the Wanted would star in their own reality series called The Wanted Life, which premiered internationally in June 2013. The show was produced by Ryan Seacrest, as well as the band themselves. In the United States, it premiered on E! on 2 June 2013. The series featured clips of the band recording the album, including snippets of "We Own the Night" and "Show Me Love", two tracks which had not previously been premiered.

On 22 July 2013, after several delays, the album's title was officially announced as Word of Mouth and it was finally announced that it would be released on 16 September 2013, but on 9 September 2013, the band announced that, due to additional recording, the album would again be delayed, with a new release date of 4 November 2013. To compensate, however, the album's artwork and official track list were both revealed that day. Tom Parker explained that the further delay was due to the band adding some final tracks to the album, "It's taken us two years to make this album and now that it's finally finished we are all really proud of the time and effort, not just that we put in to it but all the writers and the label too. We think it's our strongest album to date. We can't wait for our fans to hear it. They've been really patient but hopefully they'll think it's worth the wait!" The band confirmed that tour mate Justin Bieber had written a song for them, but they declined it and told him to keep it for himself.

== Tour ==
Word of Mouth World Tour
- Tour by The Wanted
- Associated album: Word of Mouth
- Start date: 14 March 2014
- End date: 7 December 2014
- Legs: 3
- No. of shows: 14 in Europe; 30 in North America; 44 Total

The Wanted concert chronology
- Code Tour (2012); Word of Mouth World Tour (2014)

The Word of Mouth World Tour was the debut world tour by the band, and named after the album. The band performed a total of 40 shows across Asia, Europe and North America. There were 14 planned shows in Continental Europe; however on 10 December 2013 all 13 shows were cancelled. On the group's official website, scheduling conflicts were given as the reason for the cancellation.

In January 2014, it was announced that the tour would be the group's last for a while, as they want to take time out to pursue solo careers and other interests.

=== Opening acts ===
The Vamps (UK and Ireland)

1. Wild Heart
2. Girls On TV
3. Last Night
4. Can We Dance
5. Cecilia
- Elyar Fox (UK and Ireland)
- Midnight Red (U.S. and Canada)
- Cassio Monroe (U.S. and Canada)

=== Setlist ===
1. "Gold Forever"
2. "Glow In the Dark"
3. "In The Middle"
4. "Lightning"
5. "Running Out Of Reasons"
6. "Demons"
7. "Could This Be Love"
8. "Warzone"
9. Medley:
  1. "Behind Bars"
  2. "Say It On The Radio"
  3. "Replace Your Heart"
  4. "Lose My Mind"
10. "Everybody Knows"
11. "Heartbreak Story"
12. "Show Me Love (America)"
13. "Heart Vacancy"
14. "Walks Like Rihanna"
15. "Chasing the Sun"
16. "I Found You"
17. "We Own the Night"
18. "All Time Low"

Encore

19. "Glad You Came"

=== Dates ===
Date	City	Country	Venue
Europe
14 March 2014	Liverpool	England	Echo Arena Liverpool
15 March 2014	Aberdeen	Scotland	GE Oil and Gas Arena
16 March 2014	Glasgow	Scotland	SSE Hydro
18 March 2014	Manchester	England	Phones 4u Arena
20 March 2014	Birmingham	England	LG Arena
21 March 2014	Sheffield	England	Motorpoint Arena Sheffield
22 March 2014	Newcastle	England	Metro Radio Arena
24 March 2014	Dublin	Ireland	The O_{2}
25 March 2014	Belfast	Northern Ireland	Odyssey Arena
27 March 2014	London	England	The O_{2} Arena
28 March 2014	Cardiff	Wales	Motorpoint Arena Cardiff
29 March 2014	Brighton	England	Brighton Centre
31 March 2014	Bournemouth	England	Windsor Hall
1 April 2014	Nottingham	England	Capital FM Arena Nottingham
North America
8 April 2014	Huntington	United States	Paramount Theater
9 April 2014	Silver Spring	United States	The Fillmore Silver Spring
11 April 2014	New York City	United States	Beacon Theatre
12 April 2014	Upper Darby Township	United States	Tower Theatre
14 April 2014	Boston	United States	House of Blues
15 April 2014	Montreal	Canada	Métropolis
17 April 2014	Toronto	Canada	Sound Academy
18 April 2014	Detroit	United States	The Fillmore Detroit
19 April 2014	Chicago	United States	House of Blues
21 April 2014	Minneapolis	United States	State Theatre
23 April 2014	Denver	United States	Ogden Theatre
25 April 2014	Vancouver	Canada	Orpheum Theatre
26 April 2014	Seattle	United States	Showbox SoDo
28 April 2014	San Francisco	United States	Warfield Theatre
29 April 2014	Anaheim	United States	House of Blues
1 May 2014	Los Angeles	United States	Wiltern Theatre
2 May 2014	Phoenix	United States	Comerica Theatre
4 May 2014	Dallas	United States	House of Blues
5 May 2014	Houston	United States	House Of Blues
7 May 2014	Atlanta	United States	The Tabernacle
9 May 2014	Miami Beach	United States	The Fillmore Miami Beach
10 May 2014	Orlando	United States	Universal Music Plaza Stage
11 May 2014	St. Petersburg	United States	Mahaffey Theater
14 May 2014	Columbus	United States	Lifestyle Communities Pavilion
15 May 2014	Indianapolis	United States	Egyptian Room
16 May 2014	Kansas City	United States	Uptown Theater
17 May 2014	Shawnee	United States	Firelake Arena
North America (Second Leg)
5 December 2014	Monterrey	Mexico	Auditorio Banamex
6 December 2014	Mexico City	Mexico	Pepsi Center WTC
7 December 2014	Guadalajara	Mexico	Telmex Auditorium

Festivals and other miscellaneous performances

^{A} Dubai International Jazz Festival
^{B} Universal Orlando Mardi Gras

== Promotion and release ==
On 7 May 2012, the Wanted performed "Chasing the Sun" on the second live results show of the sixth series of Britain's Got Talent. On 27 October 2013, they performed "Show Me Love (America)" live on the third live results show of the tenth series of The X Factor.

In the United States, the band performed a full live set on Good Morning America on 23 August 2013. To further promote the album, they did a series of performances on other TV shows on 4 November, the day before the album's U.S. release. They appeared on Live! with Kelly & Michael, The Late Show with David Letterman and Watch What Happens: Live, before another show at the MLB Fan Cave the following night. In 2014, they will embark on their first ever world tour, the Word of Mouth Tour, with shows in the UK, Ireland, France, Germany, Spain, the U.S. and Canada.

The album was released in three different editions: standard CD and digital download (14 tracks), deluxe CD and digital download (19 tracks – CD comes in deluxe gatefold digipack, with signed copies available from the band's official store), and MP3 badge edition (19 tracks in the form of a clip on MP3 player with the Wanted's logo on it, supplied with a set of headphones).

== Critical reception ==
Professional ratings
Review scores
Source	Rating
AllMusic	3.5/5 stars
Digital Spy	2/5 stars
Entertainment Focus	3/5 stars
Renowned for Sound	3.5/5 stars
Rolling Stone	2/5 stars
Sugarscape	7.5/10 stars
USA Today	2.5/5 stars
Starpulse	3/5 stars
Virgin Media	2/5 stars

The album has received mixed reviews from music critics. Carl Smith of Sugarscape gave it 7.5/10 and said: "Word of Mouth could probably have gone from Good Boyband Album territory to Great Boyband Album status if it was a bit shorter. There are some amazing tracks on there that we're gonna be going back to a *lot*, but there's a bit of filler too. It's definitely worth the wait, though...and we're never really ones to turn down a boyband, let's be honest." In his review for AllMusic, Matt Collar gave the album 3.5/5 and wrote: "The Wanted have always seemed somewhat older and more mature than many of their contemporaries. That, combined with the band's broader musical palette (especially for a boy band) that touches upon a bit of passionate rock balladry ("Love Sewn"), some very Daft Punk-esque electronica ("Glow in the Dark"), and more than a few post-U2 anthems ("Could This Be Love"), they often seem more in line with bands like Maroon 5 and OneRepublic than other teen pop acts. Of course, there are enough fun, dance club-ready cuts on Word of Mouth—with songs like "Walks Like Rihanna" and the '70s falsetto-heavy disco-house standout "I Found You"—to ensure that the band's many younger, mainstream pop fans will have something to enjoy. Ultimately, if the Wanted's plan is to build upon the higher profile they've gained since their reality series, then Word of Mouth is certainly something to shout about."

Brian Mansfield of USA Today was more negative and said, "English-Irish band the Wanted has a more continental sensibility than One Direction. Its third full-length album is its first stateside, after a string of singles with diminishing returns. So while "Show Me Love (America)" isn't a plea, it might as well be." He gave the album 2.5 stars out of 5. Similarly, Ian Gittins of Virgin Media gave the album two stars and called it "pop for pre-teens, for the easily impressed, and for those who are too credulous to know any better. The bland leading the bland.", but admitted that "it will do incredibly well." In another two-stars-out-of-five review, Digital Spy's Lewis Corner wrote, "aside from the singles, Word of Mouth has little else to offer. 'In the Middle' is an inoffensive air-grabbing mid-tempo and 'Demons' offers a marginally harder tone with its guitar-backed chorus. But elsewhere, 'Summer Alive' is throwaway boyband EDM, while the sway of 'Love Sewn' is more limp than the soggy bottom of a fruit tart."

== Chart performance ==
On 8 November 2013, the album debuted at number ten on the Irish Singles Chart. Three days later, it charted at number nine on the UK Albums Chart. The album also debuted and peaked at number 17 in the United States.

== Singles ==
In September 2011, it was announced that English singer and rapper Example had written a track for the Wanted. In an interview with the Daily Record, Example said, "I wrote a song for them called "Chasing the Sun" and it's great. They went into the studio yesterday and Max even cryptically tweeted that it was a tune...I thought a few people might want it at first, including Enrique Iglesias and Kylie because both have asked me to write songs for them. But as soon as someone mentioned the Wanted, I thought it was right." "Chasing the Sun" was released in the UK as the album's lead single on 20 May 2012. It was also released as the third single from the band's self-titled EP in the United States on 17 April, and was included as one of the two theme songs for the 2012 animated film Ice Age: Continental Drift. It peaked at number two on the UK singles chart, giving the band their sixth UK top ten hit.

In August 2012, the band filmed a music video in Los Angeles, reportedly for their brand new single, "I Found You". However, when the video for "I Found You" was released in October 2012, a different video was revealed. The Wanted announced that they re-filmed the video after they were unimpressed with the result of the first, however the first cut was later released as the "fan edition" of the video in January 2013. "I Found You" was released as the album's second single on 4 November and peaked at number three on the UK singles chart. "Walks Like Rihanna" was released as the album's third single on 24 June 2013. In April 2013, the band announced the release of the third single, named after close friend and Barbadian singer Rihanna. The single debuted at number four in the UK.

"We Own the Night" was released as the album's fourth single on 10 August 2013, being released on the week that the track premiered on radio, and the music video was released to Vevo. The single peaked at number 10 on the UK, and its music video was the most played video on UK music channels two weeks in a row following its release. The song was used as the official theme for The Wolverine, appearing in the opening and end credits of the film. "Show Me Love (America)" was released as the album's fifth single on 25 October 2013, a week prior to the album's release. The music video was filmed in September 2013. The track premiered on radio on 10 September 2013. They performed the song on The X Factor on 27 October. "Glow in the Dark" was released as the album's sixth and final single on 23 March 2014. It was announced at the same time they decided to take a break from recording music.

== Track listing ==
Standard edition
No.	Title	Writer(s)	Producer(s)	Length
1.	"We Own the Night"	Nasri Atweh; Kyle Reed; Adam Messinger; Nolan Lambroza	Nasri; Messinger; Sir Nolan	3:25
2.	"In the Middle"	Dan McDougall; Charles André; Henrik Michelsen; Edvard Førre Erfjord	Electric	3:13
3.	"Running Out of Reasons"	Andrew Harr; Jess Jackson; Kelly Sheehan; Jermaine Jackson; Dewain Whitmore; Hayley Hersh; Jason Blaine	The Runners; Jackson	3:46
4.	"I Found You"	Steve Mac; Wayne Hector; Ina Wroldsen	Mac	4:00
5.	"Show Me Love (America)"	Nathan Sykes; Tim Woodcock; Kasper Larsen; Ole Brodersen	Fraser T Smith	3:27
6.	"Walks Like Rihanna"	Lukasz Gottwald; Henry Walter; Andy Hill; Michelsen; Førre Erfjord	Dr. Luke; Cirkut; Electric^{[a]}	3:22
7.	"Summer Alive"	Tom Parker; Gary Clark; Ki Fitzgerald; Chris Young	Clark; The Lonesharks	3:05
8.	"Love Sewn"	Parker; Jack McManus; Woodcock; Steve Robson	Robson	4:23
9.	"Glow in the Dark"	Jaiden Roston; Tim McEwan; Sonny J Mason Osuji	Deekay	3:35
10.	"Demons"	Jay McGuiness; Siva Kaneswaran; Woodcock; Robson; McManus	Robson	3:14
11.	"Could This Be Love"	Max George; McManus; Josh Wilkinson	Wilkinson	3:08
12.	"Everybody Knows"	Mac; Sykes; Claude Kelly	Mac	3:38
13.	"Heartbreak Story"	George; McGuiness; McManus; James Reynolds; Ki Fitzgerald	Reynolds; McManus	2:58
14.	"Chasing the Sun"	Alex Smith; Elliot Gleave	Smith	3:15
Total length:				48:30

Deluxe edition (bonus tracks)
No.	Title	Writer(s)	Producer(s)	Length
15.	"If We're Alright"	Kaneswaran; Mason; Jaiden; Roston	Mason	3:40
16.	"Only You"	McGuiness; Paddy Dalton; Benny Scarrs; Ben Harrison	Benny Scarrs	3:45
17.	"Drunk on Love"	Parker; McManus; Sommerdahl	Sommerdahl	3:23
18.	"Read My Mind"	Sykes; Dalton; Duck Blackwell	Blackwell	3:45
19.	"Satellite" (Remastered 2012)	Ryan Tedder; Noel Zancanella; Evan Kidd Bogart	Tedder; Zancanella	3:02
Total length:				66:05

Japanese edition bonus tracks
No.	Title	Writer(s)	Producer(s)	Length
20.	"Glad You Came"	Mac; Hector; Ed Drewett	Mac	3:18
21.	"We Own the Night" (Scott Mills and John Dixon Radio Mix)	Atweh; Messinger; Lambroza	Nasri; Messinger; Sir Nolan; Scott Mills; John Dixon	3:06
22.	"We Own the Night" (Bass Ninjas Remix)	Atweh; Messinger; Lambroza	Nasri; Messinger; Sir Nolan; Bass Ninjas	5:12
23.	"I Found You" (TY Remix)	Mac; Hector; Wroldsen	Mac; TY	3:55

Japanese edition bonus DVD
No.	Title	Length
1.	"I Found You" (music video; original)
2.	"I Found You" (music video; fan version)
3.	"Walks Like Rihanna" (music video)
4.	"We Own the Night" (music video)
5.	"Interview for Japan"
6.	"Walks Like Rihanna" (live in Japan)
7.	"Glad You Came" (live in Japan)
8.	"Japanese Tour Diary" (the making of)

American standard edition
No.	Title	Writer(s)	Producer(s)	Length
8.	"Glad You Came"	Mac; Hector; Drewett	Mac	3:18
Total length:				41:13

American deluxe edition bonus tracks
No.	Title	Writer(s)	Producer(s)	Length
13.	"Love Sewn"	Parker; McManus; Woodcock; Robson	Robson	4:23
14.	"If We're Alright"	Kaneswaran; Mason; Jaiden; Roston	Mason	3:40
15.	"Drunk on Love"	Parker; McManus; Sommerdahl	Sommerdahl	3:23
16.	"Heartbreak Story"	George; McGuiness; McManus; Reynolds; Fitzgerald	Reynolds; McManus	2:58
Total length:				55:37

Target exclusive deluxe edition bonus tracks
No.	Title	Writer(s)	Producer(s)	Length
17.	"Read My Mind"	Kaneswaran; Dalton; Blackwell	Blackwell	3:45
18.	"Only You"	McGuiness; Dalton; Benny Scarrs; Harrison	Benny Scarrs	3:45
Total length:				63:07

Notes

- ^{^[a]} signifies an additional producer.

== Charts and certifications ==
=== Charts ===
Chart (2013)	Peak position
Australian Albums (ARIA)	64
Belgian Albums (Ultratop Flanders)	86
Belgian Albums (Ultratop Wallonia)	89
China Albums (Sino Chart)	23
Dutch Albums (Album Top 100)	70
French Albums (SNEP)	151
Irish Albums (IRMA)	10
Japanese Albums (Oricon)	36
Mexican Albums (AMPROFON)	6
New Zealand Albums (RMNZ)	23
Scottish Albums (Official Charts)	9
Spanish Albums (Promusicae)	31
UK Albums (Official Charts)	9
US Billboard 200	17

=== Certifications ===
Certifications for Word of Mouth
Region	Certification	Certified units/sales
Mexico (AMPROFON)	Platinum	60,000^{^}
United Kingdom (BPI)	Gold	100,000^{‡}
^{^} Shipments figures based on certification alone.^{‡} Sales+streaming figures based on certification alone.

== Release history ==
Region	Date	Editions	Formats	Label
Austria	1 November 2013	CD; digital download	Standard; deluxe	Island
Czech Republic	1 November 2013	CD; digital download	Standard; deluxe	Island
Finland	1 November 2013	CD; digital download	Standard; deluxe	Island
Germany	1 November 2013	CD; digital download	Standard; deluxe	Island
Ireland	1 November 2013	CD; digital download	Standard; deluxe	Island
Netherlands	1 November 2013	CD; digital download	Standard; deluxe	Island
Sweden	1 November 2013	CD; digital download	Standard; deluxe	Island
Switzerland	1 November 2013	CD; digital download	Standard; deluxe	Island
France	4 November 2013	CD; digital download	Standard; deluxe	Island
United Kingdom	4 November 2013	CD; digital download	Standard; deluxe	Island
Canada	5 November 2013	CD; digital download	Standard; deluxe	Island
Mexico	5 November 2013	CD; digital download	Standard; deluxe	Island
United States	5 November 2013	CD; digital download	Standard; deluxe	Island
Australia	8 November 2013	CD; digital download	Standard; deluxe	Island
New Zealand	8 November 2013	CD; digital download	Standard; deluxe	Island
