= We Own the Night (The Wanted song) =

2013 single by The Wanted

Single by The Wanted

from the album Word of Mouth
- Released: 11 August 2013
- Recorded: 2013 (Los Angeles, California)
- Genre: Dance-pop; electropop
- Length: 3:25
- Label: Mercury
- Songwriters: Nasri Atweh; Adam Messinger; Nolan Lambroza
- Producers: Adam Messinger; Nasri; Sir Nolan

The Wanted singles chronology
"Walks Like Rihanna" (2013)	"We Own the Night" (2013)	"Show Me Love (America)" (2013)

Music video
- "We Own the Night" on YouTube

"We Own the Night" is a song by British-Irish boy band The Wanted, released as the fourth single from their third studio album, Word of Mouth (2013). The single was released by Mercury Records on 11 August 2013, with an impact date of 1 September 2013. The song was written and produced by Nasri and Adam Messinger of The Messengers along with Sir Nolan.

== Music video ==
The music video directed by Frank Borin premiered on 11 August 2013, at a total length of three minutes and thirty-seven seconds. It features The Wanted in a pub, dancing with their friends and drinking alcohol. Nathan Sykes is seen sitting at the piano, Tom Parker is seen playing the acoustic guitar, Max George is seen socialising with a group of girls, and Jay McGuiness and Siva Kaneswaran are at the bar, talking to the barmaid and dancing. The video has since gathered over 48 million views on Vevo.

== Track listing ==
- Digital download
1. "We Own the Night" (Main) – 3:25
- "We Own the Night" – The Remixes
1. "We Own the Night" (Chainsmokers Extended) – 4:20
2. "We Own the Night" (Chainsmokers Edit) – 3:48
3. "We Own the Night" (Chainsmokers Instrumental) – 4:19
4. "We Own the Night" (Dannic Extended) – 5:09
5. "We Own the Night" (Dannic Radio Edit) – 2:58
6. "We Own the Night" (Dannic Instrumental) – 5:09
7. "We Own the Night" (Ivan Gomez & Nacho Chapado Extended Mix) – 6:51
8. "We Own the Night" (Ivan Gomez & Nacho Chapado Radio Edit) – 3:37
9. "We Own the Night" (Ivan Gomez & Nacho Chapado Instrumental) – 6:53

== Chart performance ==
"We Own the Night" debuted at number ten on the UK singles chart, becoming the band's ninth top ten single and their fourth consecutive from Word of Mouth. At The X Factor on 6 September 2013, it was performed by all five members of the group and it became The Wanted's first song to chart on the Billboard Hot 100 and the Canadian Hot 100 since their song "I Found You" back in December 2012 and January 2013, peaking at 94 and 51, making it their fourth and sixth entry into the Billboard Hot 100 and the Canadian Hot 100 respectively. It also peaked at number 40 in Australia and number 13 in the Republic of Ireland.

== Charts ==
Chart (2013–14)	Peak position
Australia (ARIA)	40
Belgium (Ultratip Bubbling Under Flanders)	8
Canada Hot 100 (Billboard)	51
Ireland (IRMA)	13
Japan Hot 100 (Billboard)	84
Poland Dance (ZPAV)	37
Scottish Singles Sales (Official Charts)	6
UK Singles (Official Charts)	10
UK Airplay (Music Week)	39
US Billboard Hot 100	94
US Dance Club Songs (Billboard)	6

== Certifications ==
Certifications for "We Own the Night"
Region	Certification	Certified units/sales
Brazil (Pro-Música Brasil)	Gold	30,000^{‡}
United Kingdom (BPI)	Silver	200,000^{‡}
^{‡} Sales+streaming figures based on certification alone.
