= Rule the World (The Wanted song) =

Single by the Wanted

from the album Most Wanted: The Greatest Hits
- Written: 2016–2017
- Released: 13 October 2021
- Length: 3:17
- Label: Island
- Songwriter(s): Ari Leff; Michael Pollack; Jakob Hazell; Max George; Svante Halldin
- Producer(s): Jack & Coke

The Wanted singles chronology
"Glow in the Dark" (2014)	"Rule the World" (2021)	"Gold Forever (For Tom)" (2022)

Music video
- "Rule the World" on YouTube

"Rule the World" is a song by British-Irish boy band the Wanted, released on 13 October 2021 as the lead single from their first greatest hits album Most Wanted: The Greatest Hits (2021). It marks their first single release in seven years, following the band going on a hiatus after the release of their third studio album Word of Mouth (2013). The song was written by Ari Leff, Michael Pollack, Jakob Hazell, band member Max George, and Svante Halldin, with production handled by Jack & Coke.

== Background ==
The Wanted released their third studio album Word of Mouth (2013). The album received mixed reviews from music critics, and performed moderately on charts, peaking at 9 on the UK Albums Chart and 17 on the US Billboard 200. The album was supported by their Word of Mouth World Tour, their debut concert tour in 2014. Before the tour began, the band announced on their website that they would be taking a break following the tour.

In 2021, after seven years of their hiatus, The Wanted reunited after releasing a new "Wanted Wednesday" episode, and later announced their greatest hits album Most Wanted: The Greatest Hits. They originally planned to reunite to celebrate their 10th anniversary in 2020, however, it was delayed due to the COVID-19 pandemic, and band member Tom Parker's brain tumour diagnosis in August 2020. On 7 October 2021, the band announced "Rule the World" on an Instagram video, and revealed the artwork for the song.

== Live performances ==
On 3 November 2021, the band performed the song live on Good Morning America.

== Track listing ==
Digital download and streaming

1. "Rule the World" – 3:17

Digital download and streaming – acoustic version

1. "Rule the World" (Acoustic) – 3:00

Digital download and streaming – Shane Codd remix

1. "Rule the World" (Shane Codd remix) – 2:37

== Charts ==
Chart performance for "Rule the World"
Chart (2021)	Peak position
UK Singles Downloads (OCC)	24
