= All Saints' Catholic Academy =

All Saints' Catholic Voluntary Academy

Location
- Broomhill Lane; Mansfield, Nottinghamshire, NG19 6BW; England; 53°09′08″N 1°12′47″W

Information
- Type: Academy
- Motto: We Shall Serve
- Religious affiliation: Roman Catholic
- Established: 1974
- Trust: Our Lady Of Lourdes Catholic Multi-Academy Trust
- Department for Education URN: 140698 Tables
- Ofsted: Reports
- Head teacher: Carlo Cuomo
- Gender: Coeducational
- Age: 11 to 18
- Capacity: 1107
- Houses: Fortitudo Fidem; Industria; Caritas; Vocare Servio
- Colours: Red, blue, gold, white
- Website: www.allsaints.notts.sch.uk

All Saints' Catholic Academy (formerly All Saints RC School) is a Roman Catholic secondary school in Mansfield, Nottinghamshire, England. It is the only Catholic secondary school in the district, with a capacity for over 1,000 students. The school is allied to St Philip Neri with St Bede's Catholic Voluntary Academy for younger pupils aged 3–11 years.

== History ==
=== The first school ===
Mansfield's first Catholic school was established along with a church for the relatively few worshippers in the town during 1877/1878 at the Manor House, Ratcliffe Gate, both named after St Philip Neri. With a growing congregation, a larger church was established at Chesterfield Road by 1925, followed in 1927 by a larger, purpose-built school nearby at Westfield Lane.

=== St Bede's ===
A new-build school was opened in 1960 at Rosemary Street for secondary pupils, whilst St Philip's continued for primary tuition.

=== All Saints' (Upper school under the three tier system) ===
All Saints' opened in 1974, initially as a 13–18 upper school with Mary Gray as headmistress. Peter Whalley took over as Headmaster in 1981. This was a new-build on a greenfield site.

==== St Philip Neri with St Bede's ====
After All Saints' school, was opened, St Philip and St Bede's continued separately under the three-tier system of lower/middle/upper, then conjoined to cater for under-11-year-olds at the Rosemary Street site. The old St Philip's site on Westfield Lane was closed and eventually demolished in favour of a new Magistrates' Court, relocated in 1996 after the old Court/Police Station areas were demolished for retail development.

=== All Saints' (reversion to two tier) ===
All Saints' had opened in 1974, initially as a 13–18 upper school with Mary Gray as headmistress. It became an 11–18 comprehensive voluntary aided school on a split site in 1984. Ken Daly was the headmaster from December 1996 until he retired in April 2008. In 2006 the school was awarded specialist status as an Arts College and the school converted to academy status in April 2014.

It has a sixth form of over 100 pupils, and currently has a total pupil population of approximately 1250. The school has approximately 75 teaching staff, plus teaching assistants and support staff.

== Governance ==
All Saints' Catholic Academy became part of a new collective in 2014, the Aquinas Academy Trust. By 2019, the trust had merged and the schools transferred to the Our Lady of Lourdes Catholic Multi-Academy Trust.

=== Aquinas Academy Trust ===
The trust oversees:

- All Saints' Catholic Voluntary Academy

and the following primary schools

- Holy Trinity Catholic Voluntary Academy
- St Patricks' Catholic Primary School, A Voluntary Academy
- St Philip's Catholic Primary School, a Voluntary Academy
- St Joseph's Shirebrook Catholic Primary School, a Voluntary Academy
- St Joseph's New Ollerton Catholic Primary School, a Voluntary Academy

Academy Trusts have a Board of Trustees, which in this case is 15 in number, made up of all the schools' headteachers, representatives of the diocese and lay-members with business experience. Each school has a smaller local board of governors: there are 12 members including staff and parent representatives.

=== Our Lady of Lourdes Catholic Multi-Academy Trust ===
A trust embracing catholic schools in the Nottingham area.

== Curriculum ==
The academy teaches courses at Keystage 3, Keystage 4 and Keystage 5. It follows the English National Curriculum for students under 16, with GCSE terminal examinations. The government progress-monitoring system is known as Progress 8.

Keystage 3

In year 7, the lessons are taught in broad ability groups, then in year 8 all subjects are setted. At Keystage 3, the core subjects are Religious Studies, English, Maths and Science. Both History and Geography are taught; there are also Computing, Performing Arts, Physical Education and Technology. French is the first modern foreign language, and German is added in year 8.

Keystage 4

In year nine the curriculum changes to allow students three years to study their GCSE options. All students study the core subjects of Religious Studies, English, Maths and Science plus PE: these take up approximately 17 hours per week. In addition, they choose from a range subjects in 4-option blocks.

== In the news ==
The school was in the national news in 2009 when a teacher was charged with attempted murder after attacking a student in a science lesson. During a trial at Nottingham Crown Court, the jury heard that, after the teacher had returned following an absence due to stress and depression, pupils had intended to provoke and secretly film the reaction, so the footage could be circulated throughout the school to cause humiliation, and that the teacher was mocked by pupils just before the attack. The teacher was found not guilty of attempted murder but admitted a lesser charge of grievous bodily harm without intent, and was given community service. After the verdict the teacher was sacked for gross misconduct, and a year later received a life-ban from teaching by General Teaching Council.

== Notable former pupils ==
- Alex Baptiste (b. 1986) – professional footballer.
- Malcolm Campbell, screenwriter
- Karl Chiverton, professional boxer
- Charlotte Henshaw(b. 1987) – Athlete – 2012 Paralympic Silver Medallist and 2020 Paralympic Gold Medallist
- Jay McGuiness, singer, The Wanted
- Will Swan (b. 2000) – professional footballer for Bradford City A.F.C.
- Eiran Cashin (b. 2001) – professional footballer for Brighton and Hove Albion.
