= Rule the World =

Rule the World may refer to:

== Music ==
- Rule the World: The Greatest Hits, an album by Tears for Fears, 2017
- "Rule the World" (2 Chainz song), 2019
- "Rule the World" (Take That song), 2007
- "Rule the World" (The Wanted song), 2021
- "Rule the World", a song by Christina Grimmie and Ryan Brown, 2022
- "Rule the World", a song by Kamelot from Ghost Opera, 2007
- "Rule the World", a song by Walk off the Earth from Sing It All Away, 2015

== Other uses ==
- Rule the World (horse) (foaled 2007), a Thoroughbred racehorse
- Rule the World (TV series), a 2017 Chinese TV series

== See also ==
- "Everybody Wants to Rule the World", a 1985 song by Tears for Fears
- Ruler of the World (foaled 2010), a Thoroughbred racehorse
- World domination, a concept of conquest of the world
- World government, a concept of a single global government
