= Walks Like Rihanna =

2013 single by The Wanted

Single by The Wanted

from the album Word of Mouth
- B-side: "Drunk on Love"
- Released: 10 May 2013
- Recorded: 2012
- Genre: Dance-pop
- Length: 3:22
- Label: Global Talent
- Songwriter(s): Henrik Michelsen; Edvard Førre Erfjord; Andy Hill
- Producer(s): Electric; Dr. Luke; Cirkut

The Wanted singles chronology
"I Found You" (2012)	"Walks Like Rihanna" (2013)	"We Own the Night" (2013)

Music video
- "Walks Like Rihanna" on YouTube

"Walks Like Rihanna" is a song by the British-Irish boy band The Wanted. It was released in Australia on 10 May 2013, and in the United Kingdom and Ireland on 23 June 2013, as the third single from their third studio album Word of Mouth (2013). The song was written by Andy Hill, Henrik Michelsen, and Edvard Førre Erfjord, and it was produced by Dr. Luke and Cirkut, with additional production by Michelsen and Erfjord under their stage name Electric.

The title of the song is a reference to Barbadian singer Rihanna. It peaked at number four on the UK Singles Chart and number three in the Republic of Ireland.

In a press conference announcing their reunion in September 2021, band member Tom Parker said that he did not like the song, saying "That song just should not exist. Go in the bin forever. It’s the f****** worst song ever." Bandmates Nathan Sykes and Jay McGuiness countered that "without being hateful, it is a fan favourite, it’s part of our history – and Rihanna liked it!" and "She was very flattered, which is nice."

== Music video ==
The music video premiered on 7 May 2013, at a total length of three minutes and thirty-four seconds. It features parodies of three other well-known boy bands' videos: "Bye Bye Bye" by NSYNC, "I Want It That Way" by the Backstreet Boys, and "Back for Good" by Take That.

== Track listing ==
CD single / digital EP
No.	Title	Writer(s)	Producer(s)	Length
1.	"Walks Like Rihanna"	Henrik Michelsen; Edvard Førre Erfjord; Andy Hill	Electric; Dr. Luke; Cirkut	3:22
2.	"Walks Like Rihanna" (7th Heaven Club Mix)	Henrik Michelsen; Edvard Førre Erfjord; Andy Hill	Electric; Dr. Luke; Cirkut; 7th Heaven*	6:41
3.	"Walks Like Rihanna" (Denim Colla and M-X Mix)	Henrik Michelsen; Edvard Førre Erfjord; Andy Hill	Electric; Dr. Luke; Cirkut; Denim Colla*; M-X*	5:20
4.	"Drunk on Love"	Tom Parker; Jack McManus; Harry Sommerdahl	Harry Sommerdahl	3:23
5.	"Walks Like Rihanna" (Karaoke Version)	Henrik Michelsen; Edvard Førre Erfjord; Andy Hill	Electric; Dr. Luke; Cirkut	3:22

German CD single
No.	Title	Writer(s)	Producer(s)	Length
1.	"Walks Like Rihanna"	Henrik Michelsen; Edvard Førre Erfjord; Andy Hill	Electric; Dr. Luke; Cirkut	3:23
2.	"Walks Like Rihanna" (7th Heaven Club Edit)	Henrik Michelsen; Edvard Førre Erfjord; Andy Hill	Electric; Dr. Luke; Cirkut; 7th Heaven*	6:38

== Credits and personnel ==
Recording

- Recorded at Luke's in the Boo, Malibu, California and Conway Recording Studios, Hollywood, California
- Mixed at MixStar Studios, Virginia Beach, Virginia
- Mastered at 360 Mastering Studios, Virginia Beach, Virginia

Personnel

- Dr. Luke – producer, instruments, programming, additional vocals
- Cirkut – producer, instruments, programming, additional vocals
- Andy Hill – songwriter
- Henrik Michelsen – songwriter, additional production, instruments, programming
- Edvard Førre Erfjord – songwriter, additional production, instruments, programming
- Clint Gibbs – engineer
- Eric Eylands – assistant engineer
- Rachael Findlen – assistant engineer
- Serban Ghenea – mixing
- John Hanes – mix engineer
- Nathan Sykes – vocals
- Tom Parker – vocals
- Max George – vocals
- Siva Kaneswaran – vocals
- Jay McGuiness – vocals
- Kyle Moorman – additional vocals
- Chris Jones – additional vocals
- Gavin Degraw – additional vocals
- Martin Johnson – additional vocals
- Dick Beetham – mastering

== Charts ==
=== Weekly charts ===
Weekly chart performance for "Walks Like Rihanna"
Chart (2013)	Peak position
Australia (ARIA)	32
Austria (Ö3 Austria Top 40)	50
Belgium (Ultratip Bubbling Under Flanders)	2
Belgium (Ultratip Bubbling Under Wallonia)	19
Brazil (Billboard Brasil Hot 100)	95
Brazil Hot Pop Songs	27
Czech Republic (Rádio – Top 100)	8
France (SNEP)	82
Germany (GfK)	54
Hungary (Rádiós Top 40)	33
Ireland (IRMA)	3
Israel (Media Forest)	6
Netherlands (Dutch Top 40)	16
Netherlands (Single Top 100)	35
Russia Airplay (TopHit)	11
Spain (PROMUSICAE)	27
Scotland (OCC)	2
Slovakia (Rádio Top 100)	25
Slovenia (SloTop50)	27
UK Singles (OCC)	4
UK Airplay (Music Week)	5
Ukraine Airplay (TopHit)	13

=== Year-end charts ===
Year-end chart performance for "Walks Like Rihanna"
Chart (2013)	Position
Netherlands (Dutch Top 40)	100
Russia Airplay (TopHit)	76
UK Singles (OCC)	96
Ukraine Airplay (TopHit)	48

== Certifications ==
Certifications for "Walks Like Rihanna"
Region	Certification	Certified units/sales
United Kingdom (BPI)	Gold	400,000^{‡}
^{‡} Sales+streaming figures based on certification alone.

== Release history ==
Release dates and formats for "Walks Like Rihanna"
Region	Date	Format	Label
Australia	10 May 2013	Digital download	Island; Global Talent
United States	28 May 2013	Digital download	Island; Global Talent
United Kingdom	23 June 2013	CD; digital download	Island; Global Talent
Ireland	23 June 2013	CD; digital download	Island; Global Talent
Germany	28 June 2013	CD; digital download	Island; Global Talent
