= Siva Kaneswaran =

Irish pop singer

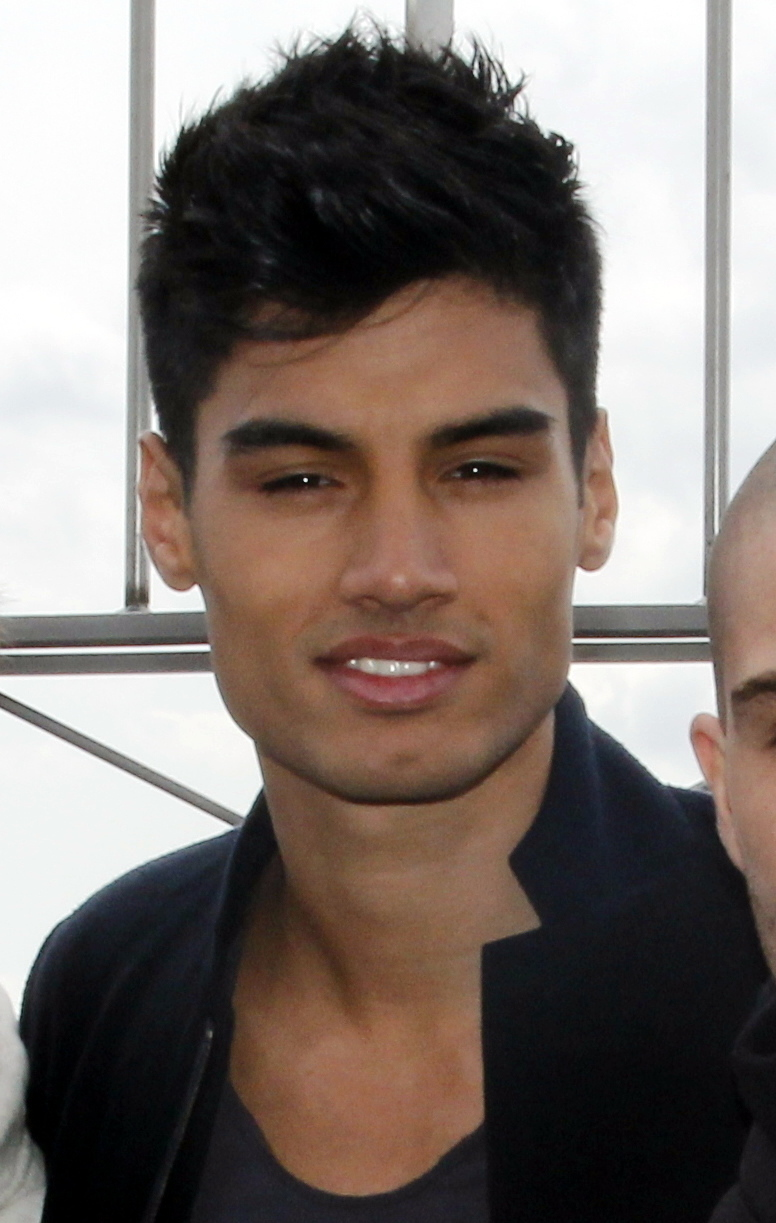
- Kaneswaran in 2012

Background information
- Born: Siva Michael Kaneswaran; 16 November 1988 (age 38); Corduff, Blanchardstown, Ireland
- Genres: Pop; synth-pop
- Occupation: Singer
- Years active: 2009–present
- Labels: Geffen; Island; Mercury; Virgin EMI
- Member of: The Wanted

Siva Michael Kaneswaran (born 16 November 1988) is an Irish singer best known for being a member of the boy band The Wanted.

== Early life ==
Kaneswaran grew up in Corduff Blanchardstown, Dublin with a Singaporean father of Sri Lankan Tamil descent and an Irish mother. He has a twin brother, Kumar, and six other siblings. Kaneswaran started modelling at 16 and appeared in various ads and landed a contract with Storm Model Management. Kaneswaran took part in Rock Rivals, televised in eight episodes between 17 March and 23 April 2008. Kaneswaran and his twin brother starred in the roles of Carson Coombs and Caleb Coombs, respectively. The brothers also appeared briefly in one episode of Uncle Max. The episode "Uncle Max Plays Tennis" aired on 11 July 2008. Kaneswaran was spotted through his modelling campaigns and subsequently recruited for the band. He is the younger brother of former Dove member and former Popstars: The Rivals contestant Hazel Kaneswaran.

== Music career ==
In 2009, Siva was selected from thousands of auditions to be a member of The Wanted, originally managed by Jayne Collins and signed to Geffen Island Mercury. The band was then signed worldwide to Universal Music subsidiaries Island Records and Mercury Records and managed by Scooter Braun. The band's debut album, The Wanted, was released on 25 October 2010 and peaked at number four on the UK Albums Chart. Their second number-one hit, "Glad You Came", topped the singles chart in the United Kingdom for two weeks, and in Ireland for five weeks. In early 2012, "Glad You Came" would sell 3 million copies in the US and reach number three on the US Billboard Top 100 Chart, as well as number two on the Canadian Hot 100. The Wanted’s follow-up singles, "Chasing the Sun" and "I Found You", both topped the Billboard Hot Dance Club Songs chart. Siva has co-written several songs with The Wanted, notably "Say It on the Radio", "I Want It All" (from their sophomore album, Battleground), and "Demons" (from their third album, Word of Mouth). In 2014, The Wanted would announce their hiatus.

In 2015, Kaneswaran made an appearance in the music video for the single "Love", by Diz and the Fam, a group he was involved in along with Dash Mihok. Towards the end of 2014, he did another tour with The Wanted in México.

In 2016, Kaneswaran wrote the song "You're Not Alone" for the Eurovision Song Contest 2016, performed by Joe and Jake. In 2017, he won the first series of Celebrity Hunted with bandmate Jay McGuiness.

In September 2019, Kaneswaran released his debut solo single, "Breathe In". In November 2020, he released another single, "Ready For This Love". In September 2021, another single, "Syrup" was released.

In 2023, Kaneswaran was a contestant on the fifteenth series of Dancing on Ice.

== Other ventures ==
Kaneswaran was signed to Storm Model Management at the age of 16 and the face of several international campaigns. Kaneswaran has been featured in several fashion magazines, including British Vogue, Cosmopolitan and Esquire.

In 2013, Kaneswaran was signed to Next Model Management.

When Siva signed with Storm Model Management in the UK, he soon began acting in Rock Rivals & Uncle Max.

In 2015, Kaneswaran signed with Agency for the Performing Arts and Untitled Management.

== Personal life ==
Kaneswaran became engaged to luxury shoe designer Nareesha McCaffrey in 2013.

The New York Times mentioned that Kaneswaran invested in tech start-up The Muse.

He teamed up with Dash Mihok to support the Tourette Syndrome Association. He is also a supporter of Girl2B, an organization in Kolkata, India, that provides a safe haven for homeless girls to live and grow.

In 2013, Kaneswaran starred in the E! channel reality series The Wanted Life.

== Filmography ==
- Uncle Max (2006)
- Rock Rivals as Carson Coombs (2008)
- The Wanted Life (2013)
