= Glow in the Dark (song) =

2014 song performed by The Wanted

Single by The Wanted

from the album Word of Mouth
- Released: 23 March 2014
- Recorded: 2012
- Genre: Electropop; electro house
- Length: 3:35
- Label: Island; Global Talent
- Songwriters: Jaiden Roston; Tim McEwan; Sonny J Mason Osuji
- Producer: Deekay

The Wanted singles chronology
| "Show Me Love (America)" (2013) | "Glow in the Dark" (2014) | "Rule the World" (2021) |

Music video
- "Glow in the Dark" on YouTube

"Glow in the Dark" is a song by British-Irish boy band The Wanted. It was released as their thirteenth single on 23 March 2014 from their third studio album Word of Mouth (2013) and was the last single they released before they went on a hiatus. The song received its first radio play on 17 February 2014 and reached number 177 on the UK Singles Chart, becoming their lowest-charting single to date.

== Music video ==
The music video for the song was uploaded to The Wanted's YouTube and Vevo account on 28 March 2014. The video features clips of the band performing the song live during their Word of Mouth World Tour. The video also features other intercut snippets of the band members traveling, dancing, practicing, and swimming, and includes one clip of a band member scuba diving beneath a tiger shark. The music video for "Glow in the Dark" achieved over three million views on YouTube and Vevo.

== Track listing ==
Digital download

1. "Glow in the Dark"
2. "Glow in the Dark" (IAmData Sunset remix)
3. "I Found You" (TY Remix)
4. "Glow in the Dark" (Karaoke version)

== Charts ==
| Chart (2014) | Peak position |
|---|---|
| Belgium (Ultratip Bubbling Under Flanders) | 88 |
| UK Singles (Official Charts Company) | 177 |
