= The Wanted Life =

- Genre: Reality
- Starring: The Wanted; Jay McGuiness; Max George; Nathan Sykes; Siva Kaneswaran; Tom Parker
- Country of origin: United States
- Original language: English
- No. of seasons: 1
- No. of episodes: 8

Production
- Executive producers: Adam Sher; Ashley Tabor; Danny Rose; Ryan Seacrest; Scooter Braun
- Camera setup: Single
- Running time: 22 minutes
- Production companies: Global TV UK; Ryan Seacrest Productions; SB Productions

Original release
- Network: E!
- Release: June 2 – July 14, 2013

The Wanted Life is an American reality television series that follows the British-Irish boy band group The Wanted. The series premiered June 2, 2013, on E! Announced on February 6, 2013, The Wanted Life chronicles the five-piece band as they record their third album and plan their first world tour. Despite acquiring 600,000 viewers for its inaugural 10 p.m. premiere, The Wanted Life was able to achieve 1.7 million viewers after three reruns of the series throughout the same night.

== Cast ==
| Cast member | Notes |
Main cast
| Max George | Max is the "ladies man" of the group, often getting in trouble for bringing back groups of female fans and partying for hours on end. He was engaged to Coronation Street actress Michelle Keegan. |
| Jay McGuiness | Jay is the "party animal" of the group, often the most wild and mischievous, although he has his serious side and knows how to be tactful in a serious situation. He is known as the "funny bunny" of the group. |
| Tom Parker | Tom is the oldest member of the group, and perhaps the most content, having been in a long term relationship with his girlfriend Kelsey Hardwick. Tom is the speaker, perhaps the leader of the group. |
| Nathan Sykes | Nathan is the youngest member of the group. He often looks up to Max as his role model. He underwent a throat surgery on April 18, 2013—his birthday—after a nodule appeared on his vocal cords. He recovered in June 2013. |
| Siva Kaneswaran | Siva is the "sensible" one of the group, often branded the most boring and independent as he prefers to spend time with his girlfriend now fiancé Nareesha rather than with the group. He is a former model. |
Supporting cast
| Nareesha McCaffrey | Nareesha is Siva's girlfriend turned fiancé and a shoe designer. She calls herself the "ladylike" girlfriend and doesn't go out partying with the boys often. |
| Kelsey Hardwick | Kelsey Hardwick is Tom's girlfriend and a dancer and part-time actress. She calls herself the "fun" girlfriend attached to the group. She often goes out partying with the boys and is a lot more laid back. |
| Kevin Myers | Kevin is the group's bodyguard. |
| Nano Tissera | Nano is the group's day-to-day manager. |
| Scooter Braun | Scooter is the group's official manager. |

== Episodes ==
| No. | Title | Original release date | U.S. viewers (millions) |
|---|---|---|---|
| 0 | "Ryan Seacrest with The Wanted" | June 2, 2013 | N/A |
A prelude to the series in which producer Ryan Seacrest interviews the band about the show, their new album and their new single.
| 1 | "Party Like a Pop Star" | June 2, 2013 | 0.60 |
The band move into their new L.A. mansion, hold a party, perform live at the Palladium, and enter the studio to record "Walks Like Rihanna" and new album cut "Show Me Love". Note: This episode was an hour long.
| 2 | "Vegas Like a Pop Star" | June 9, 2013 | N/A |
The band books a performance in Las Vegas and Nathan receives shocking news from his doctor that could put the band's future into jeopardy. Note: This episode was an hour long.
| 3 | "Fight Like a Pop Star" | June 16, 2013 | 0.63 |
The group has a disagreement regarding an approaching event. Nathan receives news about his medical problem, which puts the band on edge.
| 4 | "Obama Like a Pop Star" | June 23, 2013 | 1.00 |
The band goes to the White House to perform for the First Family. Later, Max gets ready to audition for a movie and Jay gets a suggestion from Nano to visit a vocal coach.
| 5 | "Crazy Like a Pop Star" | June 30, 2013 | 0.75 |
The group creates a video for their upcoming single and their safety is questioned when unannounced guests arrive.
| 6 | "Bahamas Like a Pop Star" | July 7, 2013 | 0.58 |
The Wanted heads to the Bahamas for a concert plus the celebration of Nathan's birthday but his vocals take a turn for the worse.
| 7 | "Comeback Like a Popstar" | July 14, 2013 | 0.59 |
Nathan's throat surgery is finally here, and the rest of the guys continue to perform without him. Jay and Tom question the band's future.

== Awards and nominations ==
| Year | Nominee | Award | Category | Result |
|---|---|---|---|---|
| 2013 | The Wanted Life | Teen Choice Awards | Choice TV Male Reality Star | Nominated |

== International broadcast ==
The series premiered on E! Australia on 9 July 2013.
