= Chasing the Saturdays =

American reality documentary television series

- Genre: Reality television
- Created by: Peter Engel; Albert Spevak
- Developed by: Perry Dance; Ted Iredell; Peter Loraine; Jay James
- Starring: The Saturdays; Frankie Bridge; Una Healy; Rochelle Humes; Mollie King; Vanessa White
- Theme music composer: The Saturdays; Charlie Holmes; Lucie Silvas; Judie Tzuke
- Opening theme: "Somebody Else's Life"
- Country of origin: United States
- Original language: English
- No. of seasons: 1
- No. of episodes: 10

Production
- Executive producers: Albert Spevak; Jay James; Perry Dance; Peter Engel; Peter Loraine; Ted Iredell
- Camera setup: Multiple
- Running time: 22 minutes
- Production company: Comcast Entertainment Studios

Original release
- Network: E!
- Release: January 20 – March 25, 2013

Chasing the Saturdays is an American reality documentary television series that follows the British-Irish girl group The Saturdays. The series premiered on January 20, 2013, at 10 pm ET/PT on E!.

On June 1, 2013, 4Music revealed an advert which announced that the show should premiere on their channel soon. Another advert then revealed the show would premiere on 13 June 2013 at 9pm.

== Premise ==
The series chronicles the lives of the group who, after scoring a string of hits in their native United Kingdom, attempt to strike it big in the United States through their signing with Mercury Records, as they prepare to promote their first American album release. In addition, the series details the personal and private lives of each of the five members.

== Production ==
The series was ordered by E! president Suzanne Kolb, who said "The Saturdays are a pop phenomenon with magnetic appeal and tremendous talent, and we are excited to capture their next chapter as they win over the hearts and playlists of America," adding that "'Chasing the Saturdays' is a perfect addition to E!'s popular Sunday night reality block, which continues to deliver can't miss original programming to viewers year-round."

== Cast ==
=== Main ===
- Frankie Bridge
- Una Healy
- Rochelle Humes
- Mollie King
- Vanessa White

=== Recurring ===
- Aoife-Belle Foden
- Ben Foden
- Anne Healy
- Marvin Humes
- Peter Loraine
- Victoria Sandford

=== Guest stars ===
- Max George (of The Wanted)
- Calvin Goldspink (formerly of S Club Juniors)
- Tom Parker (of The Wanted)

== Episodes ==
No.	Title	US air date	UK air date	US viewers	UK viewers
1	"UnitedSatsofAmerica"	January 20, 2013	February 3, 2013	914,000	72,000
The Saturdays arrive in the United States and settle into their Los Angeles apartments. They are invited to attend the MTV Video Music Awards and then have their first American performance at Perez Hilton's afterparty.
2	"SatsCriesandVideotape"	January 21, 2013	February 10, 2013	600,000	62,000
The band is shooting the music video for their first US single ("What About Us"), but a fight between Vanessa and her boyfriend while the group learns the choreography threatens to derail their progress.
3	"SatsontheBeach"	January 27, 2013	February 17, 2013	617,000	107,000
Vanessa and Frankie try to help Mollie move past a previous relationship by introducing her to new guys through a surfing lesson and dancing at a club. Meanwhile, Rochelle goes furniture shopping to prevent her husband Marvin from turning their potential new home into a man cave, but her spending habits worry Una.
4	"DeepFriedSats"	February 10, 2013	February 24, 2013	371,000	N/A
The band goes to see The Wanted perform at the Los Angeles County Fair. Mollie and Vanessa bet that Mollie can convince three people at the fair that she is a local, with the loser having to eat fried butter. The group then performs at a club, but Frankie suffers a panic attack just before they go onstage. Una makes a video diary for her husband Ben so he does not feel he is missing the developmental milestones of their baby daughter Aoife-Belle.
5	"SatsandtheCity"	February 17, 2013	March 3, 2013	497,000	73,000
The group heads to New York City, where they attend New York Fashion Week and perform acoustically for their new American label, Mercury Records. Marvin informs Rochelle that the deal for their house fell through, but then surprises her in New York City, where they picnic in Central Park. Una, who had to send Aoife-Belle back home to the UK, misses her terribly, and Vanessa takes her out on the town to cheer her up.
6	"HomeSweetSats"	February 18, 2013	March 10, 2013	432,000	124,000
The Saturdays return to London, where they are invited to test perfume. Ben sustains an ankle injury during a match that requires surgery, and Una is torn between going back to Los Angeles with the group in a week’s time and staying behind to help him recover. Rochelle and Marvin go house hunting with their estate agent, while Frankie sets up a date for Mollie with her old friend Calvin Goldspink from S Club Juniors.
7	"KeepCalmandSatsOn"	March 4, 2013	March 17, 2013	292,000	98,000
Still in London, the group works on their vocals and choreography in preparation for performances in America. Una remains distracted by the dilemma over returning to the US with the band or staying at home with Ben, but comes upon a satisfactory solution for all involved. Frankie receives an offer from Glamour magazine to do another cover shoot and to be an ambassador for Mind. Finally, everyone comes together to attend Aoife-Belle’s christening.
8	"SatsandTats"	March 11, 2013	March 24, 2013	179,000	114,000
The Saturdays celebrate their first Halloween in America, visiting a pumpkin patch and attending Maroon 5’s Halloween party. Ben flies to Los Angeles to spend his rehabilitation with Una and Aoife-Belle, and Rochelle and Mollie step in as babysitters so Ben and Una can have a date night. Frankie and her sister Tor, who is visiting, get matching tattoos of a dove on their heels.
9	"SatsontheRox"	March 18, 2013	March 31, 2013	162,000	121,000
The group prepares for their first headlining performance in America at the Roxy. Vanessa feels her voice cracking while singing high notes, while Rochelle feels constantly fatigued and sick. After visiting a doctor to rule out medical issues, Vanessa flies in the band’s UK vocal coach, who restores her confidence. Frankie, Mollie, and Rochelle plan a surprise joint birthday party for Una and Vanessa. Frankie returns to the UK after getting some sad family news just before the Roxy performance, and Rochelle may soon need to return home as well.
10	"SatsForever"	March 25, 2013	April 7, 2013	101,000	135,000
Rochelle takes a trip back to the UK, where she and Marvin learn they are expecting a baby. She returns to Los Angeles and joyously shares the news, but The Saturdays' manager, Peter Loraine, seems lukewarm. The group records a song ("Lease My Love") for Rodney Jerkins and performs on The Tonight Show with Jay Leno before departing for New York City to appear on Today. Their performance at the Highline Ballroom is jeopardized by technical difficulties, but Una saves the show with an innovative idea. The band returns to Los Angeles optimistic about their future prospects.

== Ratings and viewership ==
Upon its premiere in the United Kingdom, Chasing the Saturdays became that week's number-one most watched show on E! with 72,000 viewers, having 10,000 more viewers than Kourtney and Khloé Take Miami.

On May 14, 2013, it was reported that the show would not be returning for a second season. However, a representative for the Saturdays stated that the series was only commissioned for one season and although the series won't be returning, a Christmas special is a possibility.
