= Show Me Love (America) =

2013 single by the Wanted

Single by the Wanted

from the album Word of Mouth
- Released: 25 October 2013
- Recorded: 2013
- Genre: Pop
- Length: 3:27
- Label: Island; Global Talent
- Songwriters: Nathan Sykes; Tim Woodcock; Kasper Larsen; Ole Brodersen
- Producer: Fraser T Smith

The Wanted singles chronology
"We Own the Night" (2013)	"Show Me Love (America)" (2013)	"Glow in the Dark" (2014)

Music video
- "Show Me Love (America)" on YouTube

"Show Me Love (America)" is a song by British-Irish boy band the Wanted. It was released on 25 October 2013 as the fifth single from their third studio album, Word of Mouth (2013). The ballad, their first since 2011's "Warzone", was co-written by band member Nathan Sykes and produced by Fraser T Smith.

== Background and promotion ==
On 9 September 2013, the Wanted uploaded a "Special Announcement" to their official YouTube page. They announced that, due to extra recording, Word of Mouth would not be released until 4 November, but, to make up for it, they announced the release of a brand new single called "Show Me Love (America)" and said it would be on the radio from 8 am the following morning. They also revealed this on Twitter. It was later announced that the song would receive its world premiere on Capital FM the following morning.

== Tracklist ==
Digital Single

1. "Show Me Love (America)" [Supasound Remix] – 3:44
2. "We Own the Night" (Jon Dixon and Scott Mills Club Remix] – 6:28
3. "We Own the Night" (Bass Ninjas Remix) – 5:13

== Chart performance ==
On 31 October 2013, the song debuted at number 18 on the Irish Singles Chart, becoming the band's lowest-charting single in Ireland since "Warzone". On 3 November, it came in at number eight on the UK singles chart, giving the band their tenth UK top 10 hit.

== Charts ==
Chart (2013)	Peak position
Ireland (IRMA)	18
Scotland Singles (OCC)	9
UK Singles (OCC)	8
UK Airplay (Music Week)	7

== Release history ==
Country	Date	Format	Label
Australia	25 October 2013	Digital download	Island
France	25 October 2013	Digital download	Island
Ireland	25 October 2013	Digital download	Island
New Zealand	25 October 2013	Digital download	Island
United Kingdom	25 October 2013	Digital download	Island
United States	25 October 2013	Digital download	Island
