= Heart Vacancy =

2010 single by The Wanted

Single by the Wanted

from the album The Wanted
- B-side: "Kickstarts"
- Released: 17 October 2010
- Recorded: 2010
- Genre: Pop; R&B; electropop
- Length: 3:42
- Label: Geffen; Island Def Jam
- Songwriters: Mich Hansen; Jonas Jeberg; Lucas Secon; Wayne Hector
- Producers: Jonas Jeberg; Cutfather

The Wanted singles chronology
"All Time Low" (2010)	"Heart Vacancy" (2010)	"Lose My Mind" (2010)

The Wanted US singles chronology
"Glad You Came" (2012)	"Heart Vacancy" (2012)	"Chasing the Sun" (2012)

Music video
- "Heart Vacancy" on YouTube

"Heart Vacancy" is a song by British-Irish boy band the Wanted from their self-titled debut album. It was released as the album's second single in the United Kingdom on 17 October 2010 through Geffen Records. The song was written by Jonas Jeberg, Cutfather, Lucas Secon, and Wayne Hector. "Heart Vacancy" was originally written for English singer Leona Lewis, and was given to four different artists before being recorded by the Wanted. The accompanying music video was shot in Bale, Croatia.

Four years after the band's hiatus in 2014, Tom Parker, Max George and Jay McGuiness performed the song as a three piece at Parker's wedding to his fiancé Kelsey in July 2018.

== Critical reception ==
Robert Copsey of Digital Spy gave the song three out of five stars and described it as "a slushy, string-laden slowie about longing for a girl, but with the BPM turned up a notch and a stomping rhythm – too fast for waving lighters but slow enough for hands-in-the-air time – 'Heart Vacancy' treads on the slightly more manly side of sentimental."

== Chart performance ==
"Heart Vacancy" debuted at number two on the UK Singles Chart with first-week sales of 66,394. In Ireland, the song debuted at peaked at number eighteen. It was re-released as the band's second single in America in April 2012 but did not chart.

== Track listing ==
- Digital download
1. "Heart Vacancy" – 3:42
2. "Heart Vacancy" (Tonka's Daddycated Radio Edit) – 3:15
3. "Heart Vacancy" (Tonka's Daddycated Remix) – 5:51
4. "Heart Vacancy" (DJs from Mars Remix) – 6:15
- CD single
1. "Heart Vacancy" – 3:42
2. "Kickstarts" (Elliot Gleave, Nicholas Douwma) – 2:58
- Promotional CD single
1. "Heart Vacancy" (Radio Edit) – 3:45
2. "Heart Vacancy" (Instrumental) – 3:28

== Personnel ==
- Songwriting – Mich Hansen, Jonas Jeberg, Lucas Secon, Wayne Hector
- Production – Jonas Jeberg, Cutfather
- Mixing – Mads Nilsson
- Keyboards and programming – Jonas Jeberg
- Guitars – Daniel Davidsen
- Percussion – Mich Hansen
- Vocals – Tom Parker, Nathan Sykes, Jay McGuiness, Max George, Siva Kaneswaran
- Mastering – Dick Beetham

== Charts ==
=== Weekly charts ===
Chart (2010)	Peak position
Europe (European Hot 100 Singles)	12
Ireland (IRMA)	18
Scottish Singles Sales (Official Charts)	4
UK Singles (Official Charts)	2
UK Airplay (Music Week)	13

=== Year-end charts ===
Chart (2010)	Position
UK Singles (OCC)	110

== Certifications ==
Region	Certification	Certified units/sales
United Kingdom (BPI)	Silver	200,000^{^}
^{^} Shipments figures based on certification alone.

== Release history ==
Region	Date	Format	Label
United Kingdom	17 October 2010	Digital download	Geffen
United Kingdom	18 October 2010	CD single	Geffen
United States	10 April 2012	Digital download	Island Def Jam
