= Chasing the Sun (The Wanted song) =

2012 single by The Wanted

Single by the Wanted

from the album Ice Age: Continental Drift
- B-side: "Fix You" (live)
- Released: 17 April 2012
- Recorded: 2011
- Studio: Metrophonic (London, England)
- Genre: Electropop; dance-pop; progressive house
- Length: 3:19
- Label: Island; Global Talent
- Songwriters: Alex Smith; Elliot Gleave
- Producer: Alex Smith

The Wanted singles chronology
"Warzone" (2011)	"Chasing the Sun" (2012)	"I Found You" (2012)

The Wanted US singles chronology
"Heart Vacancy" (2012)	"Chasing the Sun" (2012)	"I Found You" (2012)

Music video
- "Chasing the Sun" on YouTube; "Chasing the Sun" (Ice Age: Continental Drift version) on YouTube

"Chasing the Sun" is a song by British-Irish boy band the Wanted. It was released as their third single in the United States on 17 April 2012 by Island Records, from their eponymous debut EP (2012). It is also the lead single from their third studio album, Word of Mouth (2013).

The song was written by Example alongside producer Alex Smith, and is one of the two theme songs for the 2012 animated film Ice Age: Continental Drift. The song was also featured in the 90210 episode "A Tale of Two Parties". "Chasing the Sun" was released on 20 May 2012 and debuted at number two on the UK Singles Chart; it also reached number 18 on the Canadian Hot 100 as well as number 50 on the U.S. Billboard Hot 100 whilst also reaching the top 20 in several other countries. It peaked at number one on both on the Scottish Singles Chart and the U.S. Dance Club Songs chart.

== Background ==
In a December 2011 interview with Digital Spy, band member Jay McGuiness was asked about a track written for the group by singer and rapper Example. "Yeah, we've been talking with him for ages," McGuiness said. "He sent a few before that didn't quite make it, but we've got one from him now that we absolutely love. Tom has it on his iPod and it's now become his most played song on there! We're hopefully going to record the track this week. It's actually similar in some ways to 'Glad You Came'. It won't be out before Christmas because people don't want to be raving when it's p*ssing with snow." On 26 March 2012, the Wanted premiered said track, entitled "Chasing the Sun".

Talking to MTV News, McGuiness said: "I think this song, it can mean many things. To some people, it is partying all night and chasing the sun the next morning. That's what [the first] video's about, the girls, the teeth are there, the vampires. So we're all there partying away. And that's one aspect of the song. Another aspect of the song is chasing your dreams, the unattainable acorn in the distance."

== Music video ==
There are two music videos for "Chasing the Sun". The first and official video was directed by Director X. It begins with the Wanted standing on the roof of the Rosslyn Hotel in Los Angeles in the middle of the night. It then begins to intersect with scenes of them in a club with some mysterious women, all of whom have strange sun-shaped tattoos on their hands, arms, thighs or belly. Each of the band meets one of these women and, upon being touched by them, all suddenly have exactly the same tattoo. The band decide to leave the club with their women and start walking down the secluded streets. They soon enter a different club. At the bridge, the boys are back on the roof of the Rosslyn Hotel, but this time at sunrise. The scene then changes back to the second club, where the boys start to get close to their women, but it turns out that the women are actually vampires, and all five boys get their necks bitten. The video ends with the Wanted walking out of the club into the bright sunlight. The video has over 120 million views on YouTube.

The second video was specifically made for the 2012 film Ice Age: Continental Drift. It features the Wanted performing on blocks of ice in the Arctic Ocean while characters such as Manny, Sid, and Diego dance alongside them; it also contains footage from the film.

The song's UK radio version was used in the first music video and the EP version was used in the second video.

== Critical reception ==
The song received positive reviews from music critics. Robert Copsey of Digital Spy gave the song four out of five stars writing, "The result may be their darkest club track yet, but it's easily the brightest they've shined since that worldwide smash."

== Track listing ==
- UK CD single / digital EP
1. "Chasing the Sun" – 3:14
2. "Chasing the Sun" (Tantrum Desire Dubstep Remix) – 5:22
3. "Fix You" (Live) – 3:29
4. "Glad You Came" (Live) – 3:22
- German CD single
1. "Chasing the Sun" (2012 Remaster) – 3:14
2. "Fix You" (Live) – 3:29
- Hardwell Remix
1. "Chasing the Sun" (Hardwell Extended Mix) – 5:50
- The Remixes
1. "Chasing the Sun" (Hardwell Edit) - 3:15
2. "Chasing the Sun" (Hardwell Extended) - 5:15
3. "Chasing the Sun" (Hardwell Instrumental) - 5:15
4. "Chasing the Sun" (Danny Verde Edit) - 3:32
5. "Chasing the Sun" (Danny Verde Club) - 7:21
6. "Chasing the Sun" (Danny Verde Dub) - 7:38
7. "Chasing the Sun" (Joe Maz Edit) - 3:43
8. "Chasing the Sun" (Joe Maz Extended) - 5:15
9. "Chasing the Sun" (Joe Maz Instrumental) - 5:15
10. "Chasing the Sun" (Smash Mode Radio) - 3:33
11. "Chasing the Sun" (Smash Mode Extended) - 4:56
12. "Chasing the Sun" (Tantrum Desire Hard Dubstep Mix) - 5:12
13. "Chasing the Sun" (Tantrum Desire Light Dubstep Mix) - 5:21
- Remixes
1. "Chasing the Sun" (Mario Larrea Remix Edit) - 3:30
2. "Chasing the Sun" (Mario Larrea Club Remix) - 5:41
3. "Chasing the Sun" (Mario Larrea Dub Remix) - 5:40
4. "Chasing the Sun" (Tantrum Desire Light Dubstep Remix) - 5:22
5. "Chasing the Sun" (Tantrum Desire Hard Dubstep Remix) - 5:13
6. "Chasing the Sun" (Paris Opera House Remix) - 5:39

== Credits and personnel ==
Recording

- Recorded at Metrophonic Studios, London, England
- Mixed at Mixsuite, Los Angeles, United States

Personnel

- Alex Smith – songwriter, producer, recording, keyboards, programming
- Elliot Gleave – songwriter
- Mark "Spike" Stent – mixer
- Matty Green – assistant mixer
- Tom Coyne – mastering

== Charts ==
=== Weekly charts ===
Chart (2012)	Peak position
Australia (ARIA)	18
Austria (Ö3 Austria Top 40)	5
Belgium (Ultratip Bubbling Under Flanders)	7
Belgium (Ultratip Bubbling Under Wallonia)	5
Brazil (Billboard Brasil Hot 100)	25
Brazil Hot Pop Songs	4
Canada Hot 100 (Billboard)	18
Canada CHR/Top 40 (Billboard)	15
Canada Hot AC (Billboard)	30
France (SNEP)	145
Germany (GfK)	17
Hungary (Rádiós Top 40)	22
Ireland (IRMA)	4
Luxembourg (Billboard)	6
Mexico (Billboard Mexican Airplay)	3
Mexico Anglo (Monitor Latino)	2
Netherlands (Single Top 100)	86
New Zealand (Recorded Music NZ)	18
Poland Airplay (ZPAV)	2
Russia Airplay (TopHit)	7
Scottish Singles Sales (Official Charts)	1
Spain (Promusicae)	33
Switzerland (Schweizer Hitparade)	49
UK Singles (Official Charts)	2
UK Airplay (Music Week)	3
US Billboard Hot 100	50
US Dance Club Songs (Billboard)	1
US Dance Airplay (Billboard)	12
US Pop Airplay (Billboard)	17

=== Year-end charts ===
Chart (2012)	Position
Austria (Ö3 Austria Top 40)	56
Canada (Canadian Hot 100)	71
Germany (Media Control AG)	87
Poland (ZPAV)	44
Russia Airplay (TopHit)	35
UK Singles (OCC)	89
US Dance Club Songs (Billboard)	37
US Dance/Mix Show Airplay (Billboard)	47

== Certifications ==
Region	Certification	Certified units/sales
Australia (ARIA)	Platinum	70,000^{^}
Brazil (Pro-Música Brasil)	Diamond	250,000^{‡}
Canada (Music Canada)	Platinum	80,000^{*}
Germany (BVMI)	Gold	150,000^{‡}
New Zealand (RMNZ)	Platinum	30,000^{‡}
United Kingdom (BPI)	Platinum	600,000^{‡}
United States (RIAA)	Gold	500,000^{*}
Streaming
Norway (IFPI Norway)	Gold	1,500,000^{†}
^{*} Sales figures based on certification alone.^{^} Shipments figures based on certification alone.^{‡} Sales+streaming figures based on certification alone.^{†} Streaming-only figures based on certification alone.

== Radio and release history ==
Country	Date	Format	Label
United States	17 April 2012	Digital download	Mercury; Global Talent
Denmark	27 April 2012	Digital download	Island; Global Talent
Finland	27 April 2012	Digital download	Island; Global Talent
France	27 April 2012	Digital download	Island; Global Talent
Netherlands	27 April 2012	Digital download	Island; Global Talent
New Zealand	27 April 2012	Digital download	Island; Global Talent
Spain	27 April 2012	Digital download	Island; Global Talent
Sweden	27 April 2012	Digital download	Island; Global Talent
Switzerland	27 April 2012	Digital download	Island; Global Talent
United States	15 May 2012	Mainstream radio airplay	Mercury; Global Talent
United Kingdom	20 May 2012	Digital download	Island; Global Talent
United Kingdom	21 May 2012	CD single	Island; Global Talent
Germany	27 July 2012	CD single	Island; Global Talent

== See also ==
- List of Billboard Dance Club Songs number ones of 2012
