= Tom Parker (singer) =

British singer (1988–2022)

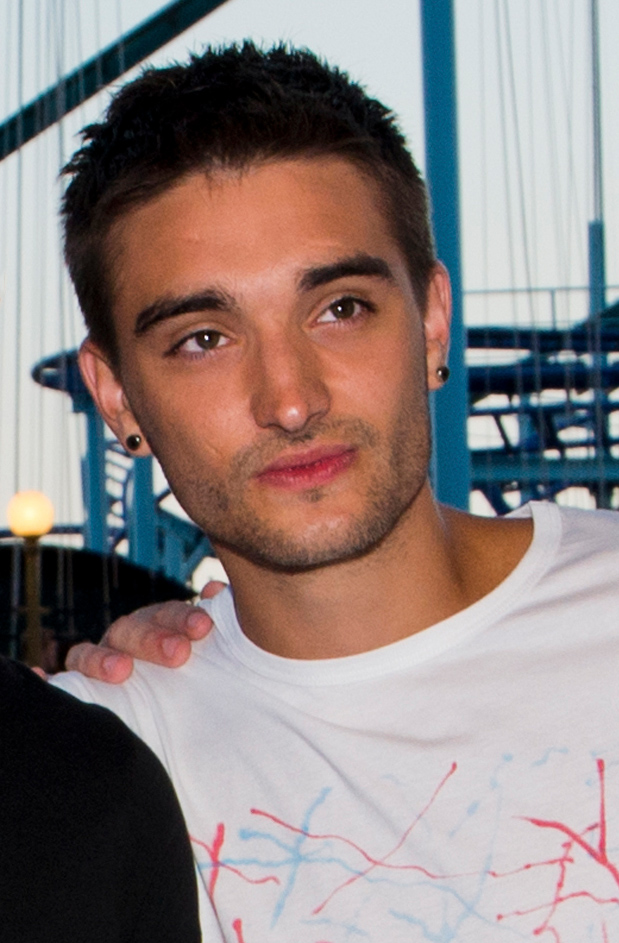
- Parker in 2013
- Born: Thomas Anthony Parker; 4 August 1988; Bolton, Greater Manchester, England
- Died: 30 March 2022 (aged 33); Bromley, London, England
- Occupation: Singer
- Spouse: Kelsey Hardwick (m. 2018)
- Children: 2
- Musical career
- Genres: Pop; dance-pop
- Years active: 2009–2022
- Formerly of: The Wanted

Thomas Anthony Parker (4 August 1988 – 30 March 2022) was an English singer, best known as a member of the boy band the Wanted. In 2013, Parker appeared with his bandmates in the E! channel reality television series The Wanted Life. Alongside the Wanted, Parker released three studio albums and achieved two number one singles on the UK Singles Chart. After the band's hiatus in 2014, he embarked on a solo career.

In October 2020, at the age of 32, Parker was diagnosed with an inoperable brain tumour. The Wanted reunited in September 2021, but after a sudden deterioration in his condition, Parker died of complications from glioblastoma on 30 March 2022, aged 33.

== Early life ==
Thomas Anthony Parker was born on 4 August 1988 and raised in Bolton, Greater Manchester. He learned to play the guitar at the age of 16 after trying out his older brother's guitar. He then auditioned for The X Factor but did not get past the first round. He went to Manchester Metropolitan University to study Geography but dropped out in pursuit of a professional singing career. Parker joined a Take That tribute band known as Take That II and toured Northern England before joining the Wanted in 2009.

== Career ==
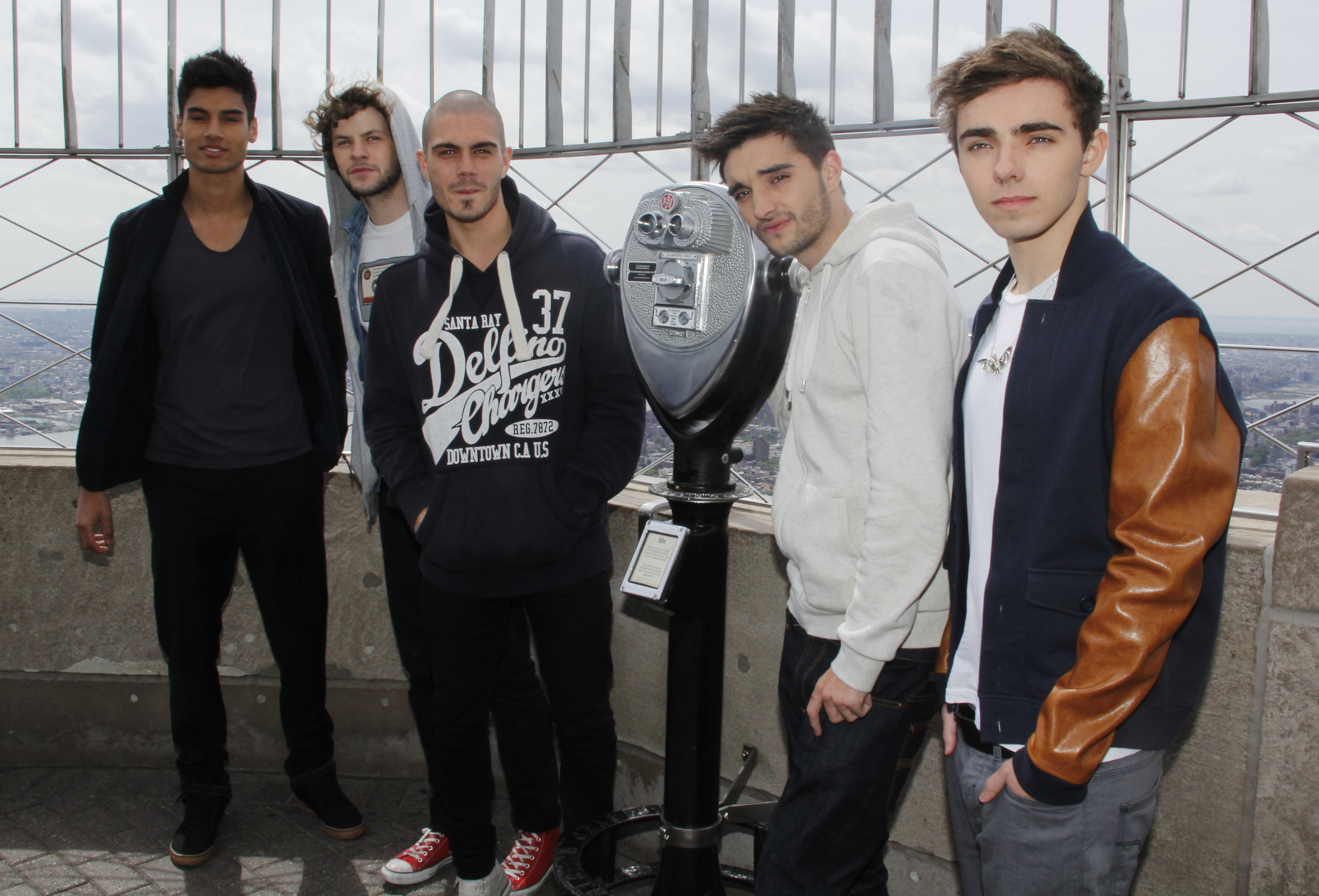
Parker (second from right) alongside his bandmates of the Wanted

In 2009, a mass audition was held by Jayne Collins to form a boy band, after successfully launching Parade and the Saturdays. Parker auditioned and was selected as one of five members, along with Nathan Sykes, Siva Kaneswaran, Max George, and Jay McGuiness out of the thousands of others who auditioned. The band was formed and together they worked on their debut album before finding a name for their band, the Wanted. Their debut single "All Time Low" was released on 25 July 2010, and debuted at number one on the UK Singles Chart. They went on to have further hits with songs like "Heart Vacancy", "Glad You Came", "Chasing the Sun" and "I Found You". In 2013, in support of a crossover appeal to the American music market, the group starred in their own reality series on E!. The series, The Wanted Life, only aired for one season. The Wanted went on hiatus in January 2014, which lasted until September 2021. Parker, as a member of the band, has sold over 12 million records worldwide.

Parker was also an avid DJ, and collaborated with Richard Rawson on a track called "Fireflies", which was released in August 2014. In May 2015, he took part in the UK version of Celebrity MasterChef and was eliminated during the semi-finals of the competition. In October 2015, he released a solo single titled "Undiscovered" along with his own website and tour dates. In February 2016, it was confirmed that he was to replace Tina Hobley on the Channel 4 show The Jump after she fell on her arm and dislocated her elbow. He eventually finished third in the series.

In 2017, Parker was cast as Danny Zuko in the UK tour of the musical Grease. He put his wedding on hold for the tour.

== Personal life ==
Parker began a relationship with actress Kelsey Hardwick since 2009. They got engaged at Chewton Glen on 16 March 2016, and married in 2018. Their daughter was born in July 2019 and their son was born in October 2020.

== Illness and death ==
On 12 October 2020, Parker announced that he had been diagnosed with an inoperable grade IV glioblastoma, an aggressive form of brain cancer. He suffered a seizure in July and was put on the waiting list for an MRI scan, later suffering another seizure on a family trip. In January 2021, Parker posted to Instagram that his tumour had been "significantly reduced" and that he was continuing his treatment. In September, he held a special charity concert at the Royal Albert Hall in aid of Stand Up to Cancer. The event, called "Inside My Head", featured artists such as Becky Hill, McFly, Liam Payne, and the first performance with his Wanted bandmates since they announced their hiatus in 2014. On 3 November, Parker announced on Twitter that his brain tumour was stable: "had the results from my latest scan ... and I'm delighted to say it is stable."

Despite his previous claims of stability, Parker later experienced a sudden deterioration in his condition and died of complications from glioblastoma at St Christopher's Hospice in Bromley, London, on 30 March 2022, aged 33. Tributes were paid by his Wanted bandmates: Max George said he was "heartbroken beyond words"; and Nathan Sykes stated that "[their] lives would never be the same"; and Siva Kaneswaran said he was "grateful that [he] had a chance to witness [Parker's] true courage". Numerous other celebrities and public figures paid tribute. An episode of Pointless Celebrities, which he and George had recorded the previous year, was brought forward in the schedules and dedicated to him.

Parker's funeral took place at St Francis of Assisi Church in Petts Wood on 20 April. Following his death, his memoir Hope: My Inspirational Life was published on 26 May.

== Filmography ==
Year	Title	Role	Notes
2013	Chasing the Saturdays	Himself	Episode: "#DeepFriedSats"
2013	The Wanted Life	Himself	7 episodes
2015	Celebrity Masterchef	Contestant	Runner-up
2018	The Real Full Monty	Himself	Participant
2021	Tom Parker: Inside My Head	Himself	Channel 4 documentary
2022	Pointless Celebrities	Contestant	Jackpot winner; the episode was dedicated to him

== Awards and nominations ==
Year	Award	Category	Result	Ref.
2022	National Television Awards	Authored Documentary	Nominated	
