= Lose My Mind (The Wanted song) =

Single by The Wanted

from the album The Wanted
- Released: 26 December 2010
- Recorded: 2010 at Kinglet Studios and A-Side Studios, Stockholm, Sweden
- Genre: Pop
- Length: 3:50
- Label: Geffen
- Songwriter(s): Nina Woodford; Rami Yacoub; Carl Falk
- Producer(s): Rami; Carl Falk; The Wideboys

The Wanted singles chronology
| "Heart Vacancy" (2010) | "Lose My Mind" (2010) | "Gold Forever" (2011) |

Music video
- "Lose My Mind" on YouTube

"Lose My Mind" is a pop song by British-Irish boy band The Wanted, taken as the third and final single from their self-titled debut album. It was written by Nina Woodford, Rami Yacoub and Carl Falk, and produced by Rami and Falk, with additional production by The Wideboys. It was released on 26 December 2010. Following a live performance of the song on the seventh series of The X Factor, the song entered the UK Singles Chart at number 29.

== Background ==
Band member Jay McGuiness said in a press release that "Lose My Mind" is "a pop tune about someone playing mind games with you, as you try and fail, to blot it all out." It was written by Nina Woodford, Rami Yacoub and Carl Falk, produced by Rami and Falk and recorded at Kinglet Studios and A-Side Studios, in Stockholm, Sweden. Additional production was done by British house producers The Wideboys.

== Music video ==
The music video for "Lose My Mind" was directed by Nigel Dick and filmed in Coney Island and it was performed at Channel 4 on 17 January 2011. A series of fifteen-second teasers for the music video were released before the full video's premiere, which was on 28 November 2010 on Channel 4. The video shows the band members heading to Coney Island in the rain. When they arrive they it is revealed they work on different rides on the Island. The video is dispersed with them singing at their respective rides, scenes where they mess about at Coney Island, with their song playing over them, and them singing directly to the camera as a group.

== Live performances ==
The Wanted performed "Lose My Mind" live on the seventh series of The X Factor on 28 November 2010. They limited the number of female dancers on stage with them to avoid making their female fans jealous, but had a large production with a fairground theme, which McGuiness said was to "distract from the fact we can't dance very well". They also performed the song on Sam & Mark's TMi Friday, and Alan Carr: Chatty Man.

== Critical reception ==
Popjustice made "Lose My Mind" their "song of the day" on 12 November 2010. A writer for website Female First called the song "an anthemic rock ballad that shows off [the members'] characteristically mature, edgy vocals and breaks them out of the traditional boyband mould." Nick Levine of Digital Spy gave the song four stars out of five and praised the song for its "brilliantly melodramatic lyrics" and "punchy" chorus, while complimenting Max George's heavily auto-tuned vocals. Following the performance of "Lose My Mind" on The X Factor, the song entered the UK Singles Chart at number 29 and the Scottish Singles Chart at number 24 on 5 December 2010, three weeks before its official single release. It left the UK Singles Chart on the week of 23 January 2011 after spending seven weeks in the chart.

== Track listing ==
- CD single
1. "Lose My Mind" (radio edit) – 3:25
2. "Lose My Mind" (Cahill radio remix) – 3:04
- Digital EP: 1
1. "Lose My Mind" (radio edit) – 3:25
2. "For the First Time" (BBC live version) – 4:30
3. "Heart Vacancy" (BBC live version) – 3:57
- Digital EP: 2
1. "Lose My Mind" (Cahill club remix) – 7:09
2. "Lose My Mind" (Cahill dub) – 5:37
3. "Lose My Mind" (Gavin Cool remix – featuring Scorcher) – 3:38
4. "Lose My Mind" (7th Heaven club remix) – 6:56

== Personnel ==
- Songwriting – Nina Woodford, Rami Yacoub, Carl Falk
- Production, guitars, bass, keyboards and programming – Rami, Carl Falk
- Additional remix, production and programming – The Wideboys
- Lead and backing vocals – Tom Parker, Nathan Sykes, Jay McGuiness, Max George, Siva Kaneswaran
- Mastering – Dick Beetham

== Charts ==
| Chart (2010–11) | Peak position |
|---|---|
| Ireland (IRMA) | 30 |
| Scotland (OCC) | 24 |
| UK Singles (OCC) | 19 |
| UK Airplay (Music Week) | 13 |

== Release history ==
| Region | Date | Format | Label |
|---|---|---|---|
| United Kingdom | 26 December 2010 | Digital download | Geffen |
| United Kingdom | 27 December 2010 | CD single | Geffen |
| Germany | 4 March 2011 | CD single | Geffen |
