= The Wanted =

British-Irish boy band

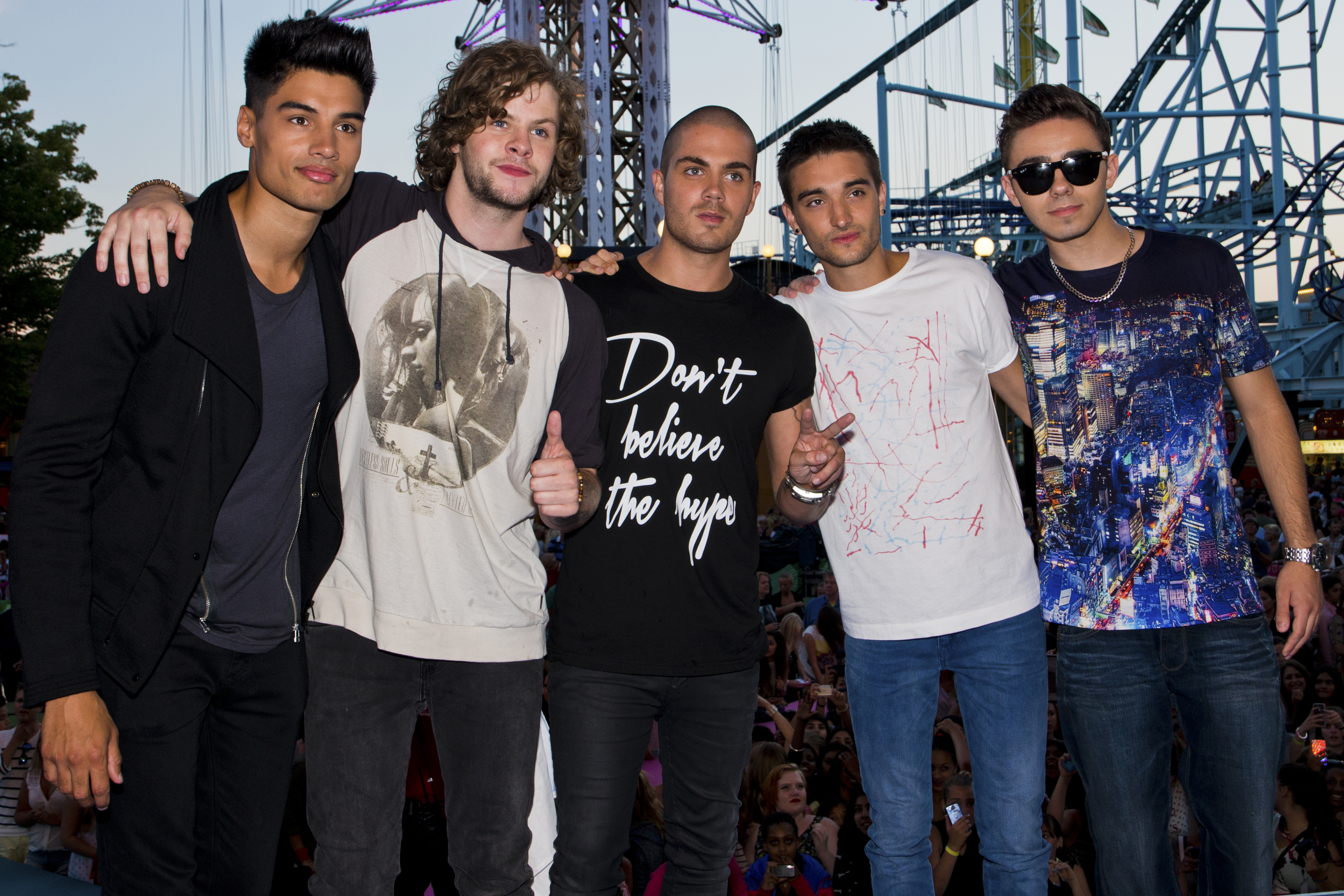
- The Wanted in 2013 at the Swedish program Sommarkrysset in Stockholm Gröna Lund. From left to right: Siva Kaneswaran, Jay McGuiness, Max George, Tom Parker, and Nathan Sykes.

Background information
- Origin: United Kingdom
- Genres: Pop; dance-pop
- Years active: 2009–2014; 2021–present
- Labels: Geffen; Island; Mercury
- Members: Max George; Siva Kaneswaran; Jay McGuiness; Nathan Sykes
- Past members: Tom Parker
- Website: thewantedmusic.com

The Wanted are a British-Irish boy band formed in 2009, and originally consisted of members Max George, Siva Kaneswaran, Jay McGuiness, Tom Parker, and Nathan Sykes. The group signed a worldwide contract to Universal Music, Island Records and Mercury Records, and was managed by Scooter Braun.

The Wanted released their debut album, The Wanted in 2010. It peaked at number four on the UK Albums Chart. and spawned three UK top 20 singles: their debut single, "All Time Low", which topped UK Singles Chart, "Heart Vacancy", which reached number two, and "Lose My Mind", which reached number nineteen. Their follow-up album Battleground, was released in 2011 and reached number five in the UK and number four in Ireland. The album lead single, "Gold Forever", was released in aid of Comic Relief and peaked at number three in the UK. The third single, "Lightning", hit number two in the UK.

In early 2012, the Wanted achieved success in the United States and Canada with their single "Glad You Came" which became their second UK number-one. It peaked at number three for four consecutive weeks on the Billboard Hot 100, the highest American chart entry by a British boy band at the time. Their follow-up singles "Chasing the Sun" and "I Found You" reached the top spot on the Billboard Hot Dance Club Songs chart. The band's compilation album, The Wanted (2012), reached the top 10 on the Billboard 200. In 2013, the Wanted starred in their own reality series on E! entitled The Wanted Life. On 22 January 2014, the band announced that they would be taking a hiatus in order to pursue individual solo projects.

According to the British Phonographic Industry (BPI), the band has been certified for 800,000 albums and 3.6 million singles in the UK. Their nominations and accolades include 14 World Music Awards, two Brit Awards, an American Music Award, and a MTV Video Music Award. On 8 September 2021, The Wanted had announced that they would be reuniting for a greatest hits album and a performance at a charity concert at the Royal Albert Hall in support of band member Tom Parker, who had been diagnosed with brain cancer in late 2020. Parker died from the illness on 30 March 2022.

== History ==
=== 2009–2010: Formation and debut album ===
The Wanted were formed in 2009 through mass auditions held by Jayne Collins, who also put together the Saturdays and Parade. The audition process, which saw more than 1,000 people attend, took over nine months. Just George, Parker and Sykes were involved at the start, and Kaneswaran and McGuiness joined later through the process. The group revealed in their autobiography that after they were informed of the line-up, seven more people were re-auditioned before they were signed to Maximum Artist Management and Geffen Records.

The group were credited with co-writing five of the thirteen tracks on the album. On 25 July 2010, they released their debut single, "All Time Low". The song was co-written by Steve Mac (who also produced it), Wayne Hector and Ed Drewett. It hit number one in the UK and spent 17 weeks in the UK top 40. The second single "Heart Vacancy", again written with Hector, was released on 17 October 2010. It peaked at number two on the UK Singles Chart. The group's third single from the album was "Lose My Mind", which reached number 19 on the UK Singles Chart following a performance on The X Factor. The group's eponymous debut album was released on 25 October 2010 and peaked at number four in the UK and has since been certified Platinum in the UK. Between 28 March and 15 April 2010, the group embarked on the fifteen-date Behind Bars theatre tour, which saw them play in twelve UK cities. They were supported by Lawson, Twenty Twenty and Starboy Nathan.

=== 2011–2012: Battleground and The Wanted: The EP ===
In January 2011, the group began to work on their second studio album. The album featured writing credits from the band members on ten of the fifteen tracks, and contributions from Steve Mac, Wayne Hector, Ed Drewett, Diane Warren and Guy Chambers. The album's lead single, "Gold Forever", was released in aid of Comic Relief and debuted at number three on the UK Singles Chart. In July 2011, the group released the album's second single, "Glad You Came", which became their second number-one single. It was number one for two weeks, and stayed in the top ten of the chart for six weeks. The single also reached number one in Ireland and remained there for five weeks. The song also charted in some European territories, and was very successful in Australia. The third single from the album, "Lightning", was released on 16 October 2011, peaking at number 2 in the UK and number 5 in Ireland. The fourth single, "Warzone", was released on 26 December 2011, with the music video and radio debut coming in early November 2011. On 7 November 2011, the group's second album Battleground was released. It debuted at number 5 in the UK and number 4 in Ireland. It has since been certified Platinum in the UK. In addition to shows in the United Kingdom, including T4 on the Beach, V Festival, and the iTunes Festival, the group supported Canadian singer Justin Bieber in Brazil on 8 and 9 October 2011 and Britney Spears on her Femme Fatale Tour at the Manchester Evening News Arena on 6 November 2011.

Between 15 February and 9 March 2012, the group embarked on "The Code" tour, to promote the release of the album. The 16-date arena tour saw the group play in thirteen cities in England, Wales, Scotland, Ireland and Northern Ireland. Known as #TheCodeTour, each concert featured an interactive element that linked to the group's official Facebook and Twitter pages.

In a bid to break into the United States market, the Wanted went on a short promotional radio and club tour of the United States, touring between 17 January to 8 February 2012. The success of the 10-date tour led to the group's official release of their debut American single, "Glad You Came". It peaked at number three on the Billboard Hot 100 and has since sold over 3 million copies there. Their debut American EP, The Wanted: The EP, was released in April 2012, debuting at number seven in the US and number eight in Canada. "Chasing the Sun" was released as the band's second official single there, peaking at number 50 on the BillboardHot 100 whilst also reaching number one on the Hot Dance Club Songs chart. "Chasing the Sun" was released on 21 May 2012. On 22 May 2012, the band opened and performed at the first Q102's Springle Ball concert. On 14 June 2012 the band performed a concert at New York City's Beacon Theatre, which was also broadcast live on music television station Fuse. The group visited Australia and New Zealand for the promotion of their extended play in August 2012. Following their promotional tour of Australia, the group headed to the US for a number of promotional concerts.

=== 2012–2014: Word of Mouth, The Wanted Life and indefinite hiatus ===
The Wanted began working on their third studio album shortly after the release of Battleground on 4 November 2011. In May 2012, "Chasing the Sun" was released as the album's lead single, and the third single from the band's The Wanted: The EP in the United States. Around this time, the band also premiered a brand new track called "Satellite", which was co-written by Ryan Tedder of OneRepublic. In August 2012, the band filmed a music video in Los Angeles, reportedly for their brand new single, "I Found You". However, when the video for "I Found You" was released in October 2012, it was a different one. The band later revealed that they had reshot the video in London, not being satisfied with the first one. The original was later released as the "fan version" on Vevo. "I Found You" was released on 5 November 2012 as the album's second single. The band confirmed in September 2012 that the album would contain a number of collaborations, including tracks with Pitbull, LMFAO, Chris Brown, Rita Ora and Dappy. In November 2012, the band announced that the album had been pushed back from the original release of 3 December 2012 to February 2013 at their request; the reason stated for this delay was to perfect the album, and "tweak out a few insecurities involving certain tracks". It was confirmed that the album would feature a track co-written by fellow label-mate Justin Bieber.

In early February 2013, it was announced that the Wanted would star in their own reality series called The Wanted Life, produced by Ryan Seacrest. In the United States, it premiered on E! on 2 June 2013. In April 2013, the band announced the release of the third single from their third album, titled "Walks Like Rihanna", named after Barbadian singer Rihanna. It was released on 23 June 2013 and debuted and peaked at number 4 on the UK Singles Chart. On 9 September 2013, the band announced that their new album Word of Mouth would be released on 4 November. It was preceded by the release of "We Own the Night" and "Show Me Love (America)". On 25 July 2013 the group was spoken to by police after champagne was thrown out of a hotel window, soaking poet Todd Swift. A police statement said "Police were called at around 12.20pm on Thursday, July 25, to a report of a man having been verbally threatened and having had a liquid substance thrown over him at a hotel in Marylebone." On 7 October 2013, it was announced that the Wanted would embark on their first world tour, the Word of Mouth World Tour, in 2014. The tour included shows in the UK, mainland Europe, the US, and Canada.

The band originally announced in January 2014 that they were taking a hiatus in order to pursue individual solo projects. In a 2014 interview with The Sun, George stated that part of the group's reasoning for taking a hiatus was due to the success of One Direction, saying "One Direction are a phenomenon that no one else can compete with. They've taken over the market. We have our own fans, who we love, but we couldn't stop things from happening". Parker later echoed George's statements in an interview with Digital Spy, stating "For The Wanted to try and compete against one of the biggest bands in the world ... it's almost impossible. I don't think any band out there can compete with them at the moment".

=== 2021–present: Reunion, Most Wanted: The Greatest Hits and Parker's death ===
Since 2020, the band had been teasing a reunion. On 5 September 2021, it was reported that a reunion would be officially announced on 8 September, with new music and performances announced, including raising money for cancer charities in support of band member Tom Parker, who was diagnosed with an inoperable stage 4 glioblastoma in late 2020.

On 8 September 2021, it was announced that the band would return with a greatest hits album titled Most Wanted: The Greatest Hits, set to be released on 8 November. The album would also include new music. Additionally, the band were set to perform at a charity concert by Tom Parker titled "Inside My Head – The Concert" at the Royal Albert Hall on 20 September 2021, the band's first performance together in seven years. The concert raised money for the cancer charities Stand Up to Cancer and The National Brain Appeal.

On 13 October 2021, the band released "Rule The World", co-written by Max George, their first single in seven years. This was closely followed by their greatest hits album, Most Wanted: The Greatest Hits, on 12 November 2021, which included another new song titled "Colours", co-written by Nathan Sykes, alongside all the fan favourites and some newly recorded acoustic tracks. Their Christmas single, a cover of East 17's "Stay Another Day", was released 5 November 2021 and also features on the deluxe version of Most Wanted. An acoustic cover of "Remember" by Becky Hill and David Guetta was released as the first promotional single off the album.

They kicked off their twelve-date Most Wanted: The Greatest Hits Tour on 3 March 2022 in Glasgow, which saw them travel up and down the UK performing to all their fans before finishing on 17 March 2022, in Liverpool. They were joined by special guest Hrvy across all twelve dates. The band teamed up with the iPledge charity, where they donated £1 from every single ticket sale in aid of The Brain Tumour Charity.

Parker died on 30 March 2022, as stated by his wife. The band's single "Gold Forever" surged in sales and streams following the announcement, and the song debuted at number 2 on the UK Singles Sales Chart on 1 April 2022. On 27 April 2022, the Wanted released a new version of the song, titled "Gold Forever (For Tom)" in tribute. All proceeds of the single sales will be donated to The Brain Tumour Charity.

== Members ==
Current members

- Max George – lead and backing vocals (2009–2014; 2021–present)
- Siva Kaneswaran – lead and backing vocals (2009–2014; 2021–present)
- Jay McGuiness – lead and backing vocals (2009–2014; 2021–present)
- Nathan Sykes – lead and backing vocals (2009–2014; 2021–present)

Former members

- Tom Parker – lead and backing vocals (2009–2014, 2021–2022; died 2022)

== Discography ==
- The Wanted (2010)
- Battleground (2011)
- Word of Mouth (2013)

== Media ==
=== Wanted Wednesday ===
The group run a weekly online podcast, #WantedWednesday, featuring backstage footage, social activities and exclusive performances.

=== Wanted World ===
In 2012, the group launched an interactive fan site titled Wanted World, where the fans can get exclusive access to new videos, merchandise, VIP tour tickets, and live web chats. Platinum membership costs £100 per year and gold membership £40 per year. Since 2013, fans have been able to buy a £5 monthly membership that gives them the same access as gold membership.

== Tours ==
The Behind Bars Tour was the band's first theatre tour which sold out within weeks of going on sale. It began on 26 March 2011 and concluded on until 15 April. The tour featured 12 different cities with a total of sixteen dates.

The Behind Bars Tour
Date	City	Theatre
26 March 2011	Rhyl	Pavilion
28 March 2011	Manchester	O2 Apollo
29 March 2011	Manchester	O2 Apollo
30 March 2011	Newcastle	City Hall
1 April 2011	Brighton	Brighton Centre
2 April 2011	Nottingham	Royal Concert Hall
3 April 2011	Cardiff	Motorpoint Arena
5 April 2011	Plymouth	Pavilions
6 April 2011	London	Hammersmith Apollo
7 April 2011	London	Hammersmith Apollo
9 April 2011	Bournemouth	International Centre
10 April 2011	Sheffield	City Hall
11 April 2011	Wolverhampton	Civic Hall
13 April 2011	Glasgow	Clyde Auditorium
14 April 2011	Glasgow	Clyde Auditorium
15 April 2011	Edinburgh	Playhouse

Set list – United Kingdom 2011

Tour set list

1. "Behind Bars"
2. "Lose My Mind"
3. "Weakness"
4. "Personal Soldier"
5. "Let's Get Ugly"
6. "A Good Day for Love to Die"
7. "Hi & Low"
8. "Golden"
9. "Animal" (Neon Trees cover)
10. "Iris" (Goo Goo Dolls cover)
11. "Heart Vacancy"
12. "Lightning"
13. "Say It on the Radio"
14. "Dynamite" / "Higher" / "Dirty Picture" / "Break Your Heart" (Taio Cruz medley)
15. "Made"
16. "Replace Your Heart"
17. "Gold Forever"
18. "All Time Low"
19. "Glad You Came"

It was announced on Friday 16 December 2011 that the group would embark on their first US tour, with 10 dates to be held over January and February 2012.

The Wanted US Tour
Date	City	Theatre
17 January 2012	Orlando, Florida	The Social
20 January 2012	Washington, D.C.	Rock 'n' Roll Hotel
22 January 2012	New York City	Irving Plaza
24 January 2012	Philadelphia	Theatre of Living Arts
26 January 2012	Chicago	Bottom Lounge
27 January 2012	Minneapolis	Fine Line
31 January 2012	Dallas	The Prophet Bar
2 February 2012	Salt Lake City	Club Soung
7 February 2012	San Diego	House of Blues
8 February 2012	Los Angeles	El Rey Theatre

The Wanted announced that they would embark on their first arena tour across the UK and Ireland in February and March 2012. Known as the Code Tour and T.W.A.T., each concert featured an interactive element that links to their official Facebook and Twitter pages.

The Code Tour
Date	City	Venue
15 February 2012	Nottingham	Capital FM Arena
17 February 2012	Manchester	Evening News Arena
18 February 2012	Sheffield	Motorpoint Arena
20 February 2012	Brighton	Brighton Centre
23 February 2012	Cardiff	Motorpoint Arena
24 February 2012	Liverpool	Echo Arena
25 February 2012	Newcastle	Metro Radio Arena
27 February 2012	Glasgow	S.E.C.C.
28 February 2012	Aberdeen	A.E.C.C.
1 March 2012	Birmingham	LG Arena
2 March 2012	Bournemouth	International Centre
3 March 2012	London	The O_{2} Arena
5 March 2012	Brighton	Brighton Centre
6 March 2012	Bournemouth	International Centre
8 March 2012	Belfast	Odyssey Arena
9 March 2012	Dublin	The O_{2}

Set list – United Kingdom 2012

Tour set list

1. "Invincible"
2. "Lose My Mind"
3. "Rocket"
4. "Lie to Me"
5. "Lightning"
6. "Last to Know"
7. "Dagger"
8. "Heart Vacancy"
9. "I Want It All"
10. "I'll Be Your Strength"
11. "Warzone"
12. "Viva la Vida" / "Every Teardrop Is a Waterfall" / "Paradise" / "Fix You" (Coldplay cover)
13. "Say It on the Radio"
14. "Gold Forever"
15. "All Time Low"
16. "Glad You Came"

== Filmography ==
Television
Year	Title	Role	Notes
2013	Chasing the Saturdays	Themselves	1 Episode: #DeepFriedSats
2013	The Wanted Life	Themselves	TV series

== Awards and nominations ==
Year	Nominee	Award	Category	Result	Ref
2010	The Wanted	Virgin Media Music Awards	Best Newcomer	Nominated	
2010	The Wanted	Virgin Media Music Awards	Best Group	Nominated	
2010	The Wanted	4Music Video Honours	Hottest Boys	Won	
2010	The Wanted	4Music Video Honours	Box Biggest Breakthrough	Won	
2010	"All Time Low"	4Music Video Honours	Best Video	Nominated	
2011	"All Time Low"	Brit Awards	Best British Single	Nominated	
2011	The Wanted	Arqiva Awards	Best Breakthrough	Won	
2011	The Wanted	BBC Radio 1 Teen Awards	Best British Music Act	Won	
2012	"Glad You Came"	Brit Awards	Best British Single	Nominated	
2012	The Wanted	Nickelodeon UK Kids' Choice Awards	Favourite UK Band	Nominated	
2012	"Glad You Came"	Teen Choice Awards	Choice Summer Song	Nominated	
2012	The Wanted	Teen Choice Awards	Choice Music: Breakout Group	Nominated	
2012	The Wanted	Teen Choice Awards	Choice Summer Music Star: Group	Nominated	
2012	The Wanted	Teen Choice Awards	Choice Music Group	Nominated	
2012	The Wanted	MTV Video Music Awards	Best New Artist	Nominated	
2012	The Wanted	American Music Awards	Favorite Pop/Rock Band, Duo or Group	Nominated	
2013	The Wanted	People's Choice Awards	Favorite Breakout Artist	Won	
2013	The Wanted	Virgin Media Music Awards	Best Group	Won	
2013	The Wanted	Canadian Radio Music Awards	International Group of the Year	Nominated	
2013	The Wanted	Nickelodeon UK Kids' Choice Awards	Favourite UK Band	Nominated	
2013	The Wanted	Radio Disney Music Awards	Best Music Group	Nominated	
2013	The Wanted	Teen Choice Awards	Choice Music Group	Nominated	
2013	The Wanted	Teen Choice Awards	Choice TV Male Reality Star	Nominated	
2014	The Wanted	Kids' Choice Awards	UK Favourite Band	Nominated	
2014	TWFanmily	Kids' Choice Awards	UK Favourite Fan Family	Nominated	
2014	"Chasing the Sun"	World Music Awards	World's Best Song	Nominated	
2014	"Chasing the Sun"	World Music Awards	World's Best Video	Nominated	
2014	"I Found You"	World Music Awards	World's Best Song	Nominated	
2014	"I Found You"	World Music Awards	World's Best Video	Nominated	
2014	"Show Me Love (America)"	World Music Awards	World's Best Song	Nominated	
2014	"Show Me Love (America)"	World Music Awards	World's Best Video	Nominated	
2014	"Walks Like Rihanna"	World Music Awards	World's Best Song	Nominated	
2014	"Walks Like Rihanna"	World Music Awards	World's Best Video	Nominated	
2014	"We Own the Night"	World Music Awards	World's Best Song	Nominated	
2014	"We Own the Night"	World Music Awards	World's Best Video	Nominated	
2014	Battleground	World Music Awards	World's Best Album	Nominated	
2014	Word of Mouth	World Music Awards	World's Best Album	Nominated	
2014	The Wanted	World Music Awards	World's Best Group	Nominated	
2014	The Wanted	World Music Awards	World's Best Live Act	Nominated	
