= Jay McGuiness =

British singer and songwriter

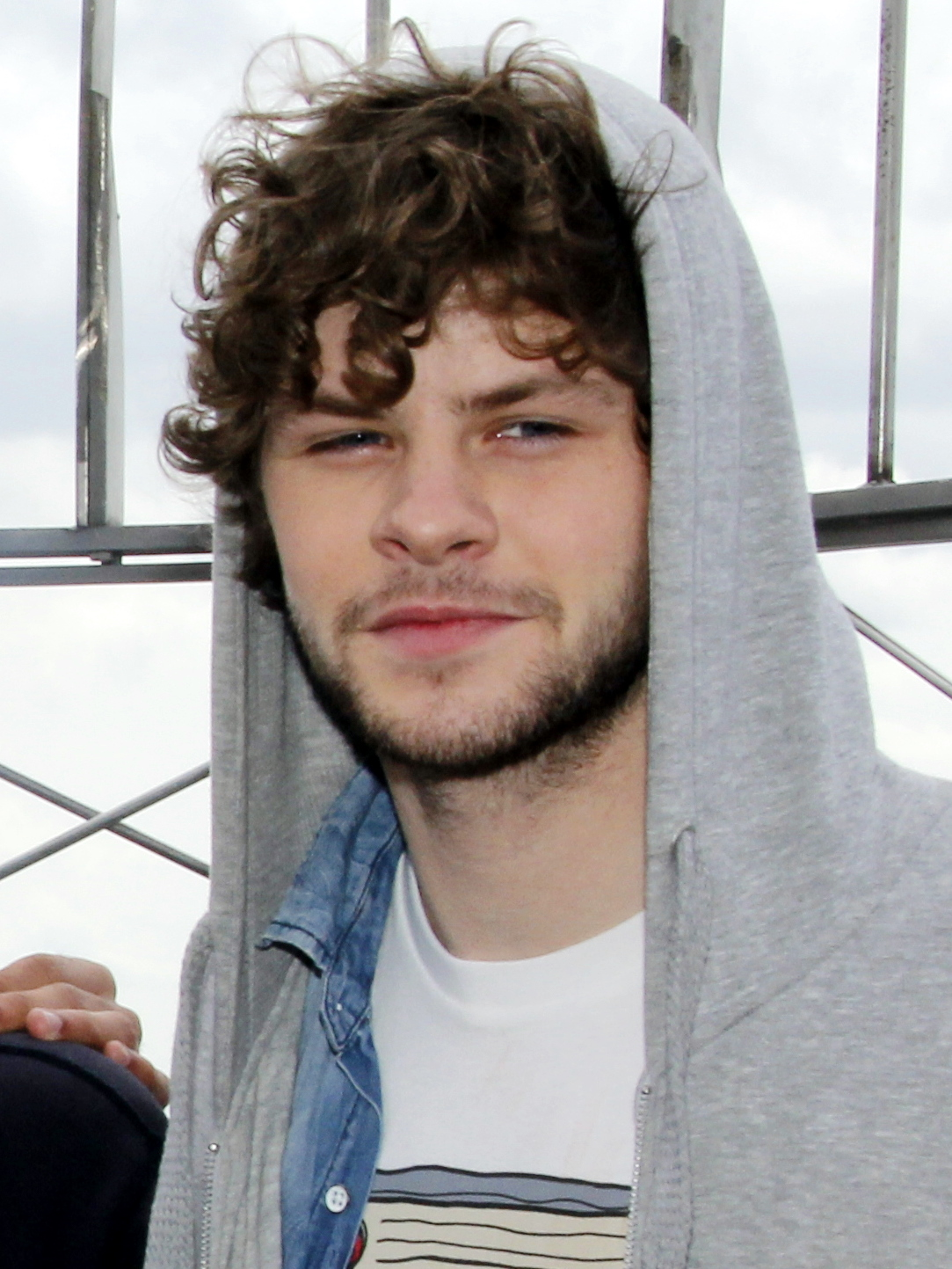
- McGuiness in 2012

Background information
- Born: James McGuiness; 24 July 1990 (age 36)
- Origin: Newark, Nottinghamshire, England
- Genres: Pop
- Occupations: Singer; songwriter
- Instrument: Vocals
- Years active: 2009–present

James "Jay" McGuiness (born 24 July 1990) is a British singer, songwriter, actor and author best known as a vocalist with boy band The Wanted. In 2015, partnered with Aliona Vilani, he won the 13th series of BBC's Strictly Come Dancing. In February 2024 Jay’s debut fantasy novel ‘Blood Flowers’ was published worldwide by Scholastic.

McGuiness has forged a career in musical theatre starring in BIG! The Musical at the Dominion Theatre in London's West End, Sleepless - A Musical romance at the Troubador Theatre and Rip It Up at the Garrick Theatre. In 2022 McGuiness took the lead role of Bob Wallace in the touring musical version of the classic movie White Christmas. In 2024, Jay landed the role of Ben in the award winning play 2:22 A Ghost Story. McGuiness is a committed conservationist and environmentalist.

== Early life ==
McGuiness grew up in Newark, Nottinghamshire, and attended All Saints RC School, Mansfield. He has a twin brother, and three other siblings.

From the age of 12, he pursued his love of performing by attending the Charlotte Hamilton School of Dance in Newark. As his love for the performing arts grew he attended the prestigious Midlands Academy of Dance and Drama in Carlton near Nottingham.

== Career ==
=== The Wanted ===
McGuiness is known as one fifth of Anglo-Irish boy band The Wanted. He has been a member of the band since 2010, alongside Max George, Siva Kaneswaran, Tom Parker and Nathan Sykes. He discovered the band by Googling 'auditions' and getting two results, one for a circus and one for the band.

In October 2017, McGuiness won the first series of Celebrity Hunted alongside bandmate Siva Kaneswaran.

=== Strictly Come Dancing ===
On 24 August 2015, McGuiness was confirmed as a celebrity contestant in the BBC's Strictly Come Dancing. He was partnered with professional dancer Aliona Vilani. In the third week of competition, he was awarded a total of 37 points out of 40, the highest week 3 score in the history of the competition, for his jive, to "You Never Can Tell" & "Misirlou", receiving the first 10 of the series. In week 6, he danced an American Smooth to "Li'l Red Riding Hood" by Sam the Sham and the Pharaohs and scored 34, putting him in second place by only one point. In week 10 he danced a tango to "When Doves Cry" by Prince and scored 38. In Week 11 he danced a rumba to "Falling Slowly", from the musical Once, and scored 39, putting him at the top. In the semi-final his Charleston scored 37. In the final, on 19 December 2015, the couple danced a quickstep to "My Generation" by The Who, scoring 36, a showdance to "Can't Feel My Face" by The Weeknd, scoring 35, and a pasodoble to "It's My Life" by Bon Jovi, scoring 39. In the public vote the couple were voted the series winners, gaining the Glitterball trophy.

In 2020, the BBC ran an audience poll for the greatest Strictly dance of all time as part of the 2020 Christmas special. Jay's ‘Pulp Fiction’ Jive topped the poll as viewers favourite Strictly routine ever.

Strictly Come Dancing performances

Week #	Dance/Song	Judges' scores				Total	Result
Week #	Dance/Song	Revel Horwood	Bussell	Goodman	Tonioli	Total	Result
1	Cha-Cha-Cha / "Reach Out, I'll Be There"	5	8	7	7	27	No Elimination
2	Waltz / "See the Day"	7	8	8	8	31	Safe
3	Jive / "Misirlou/You Never Can Tell"	9	9	9	10	37	Safe
4	Quickstep / "My Generation"	5	7	6	7	25	Safe
5	Paso Doble / "It's My Life"	8	9	8	8	33	Safe
6	American Smooth / "Li'l Red Riding Hood"	8	9	8	9	34	Safe
7	Argentine Tango / "Diferente"	8	9	8	9	34	Safe
8	Foxtrot / "Lay Me Down"	6	8	8	8	30	Safe
9	Salsa / "Cuba"	9	9	9	9	36	Safe
10	Tango / "When Doves Cry"	9	10	9	10	38	Safe
10	Quickstep-athon / "Sing, Sing, Sing"	Awarded	3	Extra	Points	41	Safe
11	Rumba / "Falling Slowly"	9	10	10	10	39	Safe
12	Viennese Waltz / "Have You Ever Really Loved a Woman?"	8	9	8	9	34	Safe
12	Charleston / "Doctor Jazz"	9	9	9	10	37	Safe
13	Quickstep / "My Generation"	9	9	9	9	36	Winner
13	Showdance / "Can't Feel My Face"	8	9	9	9	35	Winner
13	Paso Doble / "It's My Life"	9	10	10	10	39	Winner

=== Theatre ===
In 2018 he made his West End debut in Big The Musical at the Dominion Theatre, a musical remake of the 1988 film Big starring Tom Hanks. He played Josh Baskin, the character made famous by Hanks, and co starred with Kimberley Walsh, Matthew Kelly, and Wendi Peters.

In October 2018 McGuiness appeared at the London Palladium in the show Rip it Up the 60s, alongside Harry Judd, Aston Merrygold and Louis Smith. The show then transferred to the Garrick Theatre.

October 2019 saw McGuiness land the leading role in the West End musical BIG!, playing the role of Josh Baskin, made famous by Tom Hanks in the hit movie.

In 2020 McGuiness starred in Sleepless, the musical adaptation of the 1993 movie Sleepless in Seattle, at the Wembley Park Troubadour Theatre. Reuniting with his Big co-star Kimberley Walsh, also featuring Harriet Thorpe and Corey English.

In 2022, McGuiness starred in the touring production of White Christmas playing the role of Bob Wallace.

Also in 2022, he took part in and won Richard Osman's House of Games on BBC television, following a tense daily battle with fellow contestant Bobby Seagull.

In January 2023, Jay took the role of Ben in the UK tour of the award winning play 2:22 - A Ghost Story.

== Personal life ==
McGuiness is vegetarian, although he has described himself as "not a militant vegetarian by any means". He was named PETA's Sexiest Male Vegetarian Celebrity in 2013.

== Filmography ==
Television
Year	Title	Role	Notes
2013	Chasing the Saturdays	Himself	Episode: "DeepFriedSats"
2013	The Wanted Life	Himself	
2015	Strictly Come Dancing	Contestant	Series 13
2017	Celebrity Hunted	Contestant	Series 1
2025	Pilgrimage	Pilgrim	The Road through the Alps

== Stage ==
Year	Title	Role	Notes
2016–2017	Big The Musical	Josh Baskin	
2025	& Juliet	William Shakespeare	UK Tour
2026	Sea Witch	TBA	Theatre Royal, Drury Lane
