= I Found You (The Wanted song) =

Single by The Wanted

from the album Word of Mouth
- Released: 4 November 2012
- Recorded: 2012
- Genre: Dance-pop; Eurodance
- Length: 4:00
- Label: Island; Global Talent
- Songwriters: Steve Mac; Wayne Hector; Ina Wroldsen
- Producer: Steve Mac

The Wanted singles chronology
"Chasing the Sun" (2012)	"I Found You" (2012)	"Walks Like Rihanna" (2013)

Music video
- "I Found You (PARENTAL ADVISORY)" on YouTube "I Found You (Fan version)" on YouTube

"I Found You" is a song by British-Irish boy band The Wanted. The single was released on 6 November 2012 as the second single from their third studio album, Word of Mouth (2013). The track received its first radio play on 7 September 2012, but was previewed on the band's official website the day before.

== Background ==
Nathan Sykes told Digital Spy about the song: "We're doing a video for it in a couple of weeks as well in LA, which is really exciting. We are just trying to lock down all the ideas for it now." Max George added: "We've been working on our next album for, like, the last six months, but it's still not ready yet. We're still working away on that and we've got plenty more travelling to do yet, so I'm not actually sure when the album is going to be ready."

The music video for the track was filmed on the week beginning 27 August in Los Angeles. In a preview shot from the video, Nathan is chased by a group of mental fans. Later, a new video was filmed due to undisclosed reasons, and that one was shot in London. This video became the official "I Found You" video. The video was released on 15 October 2012. The video is directed by Chris Marrs Piliero, who also directed Kesha's "Blow", and Britney Spears's "Criminal" and "I Wanna Go". The video filmed in LA was later posted on YouTube on 23 January 2013. The song is written in the key of A minor.

== Music videos ==
The video features Storm model Chloe Lloyd. It starts with a shot of a woman, played by Lloyd, who has been tied up and gagged. The Wanted are seen walking somewhere while singing their parts. Max is seen holding a boxer. Scenes of them at a party are shown, where Nathan is seen talking to the same woman as an unknown man watches them. They reach a house which is later revealed to be the location where the woman has been kidnapped and the kidnapper is the same man from the party. They enter the house and fight the man's henchmen. They manage to take out all of them as Nathan approaches the woman who has been kidnapped and kisses her passionately. He steals a key from the woman's belt, gets up, winks, then leaves. The woman realizes that he is the man she talked to at the party. Nathan hands Tom the key and the guys depart the house, leaving the woman still tied up. In the end, they fish out a box from the sea, and open it with the key. The video ends as they open the box containing diamonds. They are satisfied with the box and its contents and close it.

On 21 January 2013, a second version of the video was released on The Wanted's YouTube page. The video starts with an older gentleman introducing The Wanted in a black and white screen. As the entire audience (of females) go completely crazy over the band. Soon after the video goes to full colour as the screaming fans get louder. Right around the middle of the music video, the fans start invading the stage, forcing The Wanted to escape through the back door, as Nathan sings the bridge on a ladder. Soon after the boys are able to runaway safely to their limousine. Two hours later the band starts looking through photos of their performance in their limo and notice that Nathan is missing, and then Nathan is seen running away from many screaming females.

== Track listing ==
CD single / digital EP
No.	Title	Writer(s)	Producer(s)	Length
1.	"I Found You"	Steve Mac; Wayne Hector; Ina Wroldsen	Steve Mac	3:59
2.	"I Found You" (Extended Mix)	Steve Mac; Wayne Hector; Ina Wroldsen	Steve Mac	6:31
3.	"Mad Man"	Fabian Torsson; Nina Woodford; Britt Burton; Tom Parker; Max George; Jay McGuiness; Siva Kaneswaran; Nathan Sykes	Phat Fabe	3:09
4.	"I Found You" (Steve Pitron and Max Sanna Club Edit)	Steve Mac; Wayne Hector; Ina Wroldsen	Steve Mac; Pitron; Sanna*	4:40
5.	"I Found You" (DC Breaks Remix)	Steve Mac; Wayne Hector; Ina Wroldsen	Steve Mac; DC Breaks*	4:30

CD single / digital EP
No.	Title	Length
1.	"I Found You" (Bob Sinclar Remix)	4:59
2.	"I Found You" (Moto Blanco Remix)	7:23

- The Remixes
1. "I Found You" (Bob Sinclar Remix) - 4:58
2. "I Found You" (Bob Sinclar Edit) - 3:07
3. "I Found You" (Moto Blanco Club Mix) - 7:22
4. "I Found You" (Moto Blanco Edit) - 4:02
5. "I Found You" (Joe Gauthreaux & Warren Rigg Club Mix) - 7:47
6. "I Found You" (Joe Gauthreaux & Warren Rigg Radio Mix) - 4:05
7. "I Found You" (Joe Gauthreaux & Warren Rigg Dub Mix) - 7:34
8. "I Found You" (Steve Pitron & Max Sanna Remix) - 3:40
9. "I Found You" (Steve Pitron & Max Sanna Club Mix) - 6:35

== Charts ==
=== Weekly charts ===
Chart (2012–2013)	Peak position
Australia (ARIA)	63
Belgium (Ultratip Bubbling Under Flanders)	60
Belgium (Ultratip Bubbling Under Wallonia)	9
Canada Hot 100 (Billboard)	50
Ireland (IRMA)	8
Israel International Airplay (Media Forest)	4
Scotland Singles (OCC)	3
Slovakia Airplay (ČNS IFPI)	11
UK Singles (OCC)	3
UK Airplay (Music Week)	10
US Billboard Hot 100	89
US Dance Club Songs (Billboard)	1

=== Year-end charts ===
Chart (2012)	Position
UK Singles (OCC)	197
Chart (2013)	Position
US Dance Club Songs (Billboard)	37

== Certifications ==
Region	Certification	Certified units/sales
Brazil (Pro-Música Brasil)	Gold	30,000^{‡}
Canada (Music Canada)	Gold	40,000^{*}
^{*} Sales figures based on certification alone.^{‡} Sales+streaming figures based on certification alone.

== Release history ==
Release dates and formats for "I Found You"
Region	Date	Format	Label(s)	Ref.
United States	8 October 2012	Mainstream airplay	Mercury	

== See also ==
- List of number-one dance singles of 2013 (U.S.)
